= List of light-gun games =

This is a list of light-gun games, video games that use a non-fixed gun controller, organized by the arcade, video game console or home computer system that they were made available for. Ports of light-gun games which do not support a light gun (e.g. the Sega Saturn version of Corpse Killer) are not included in this list. Arcade games are organized alphabetically, while home video games are organized alphabetically by the system's company and then subdivided by the respective company's systems in a chronological fashion.

== Arcade ==
- 2 SPICY (Sega, 2007)
- Aim For Cash (Namco, 2004)
- Alien 3: The Gun (Sega, 1993)
- Aliens: Armageddon (Raw Thrills, 2014)
- Aliens: Extermination (Global VR, 2006)
- Angry Birds Boom! (Raw Thrills, 2024)
- Area 51 (Atari, 1995)
- Area 51: Site 4 (Atari Games, 1998)
- Area 51 / Maximum Force Duo (Atari Games, 1998)
- Bang! (Gaelco, 1998)
- Balloon Gun (Sega, 1975)
- Battle Shark (Nintendo, 1977)
- Bazooka (Taito, 1995)
- Beast Busters: Second Nightmare (SNK, 1999)
- Beast Busters (SNK, 1989)
- Behind... Enemy Lines (Sega, 1998)
- Big Buck Hunter (Incredible Technologies, Inc., 2000)
- Big Buck Hunter: Shooter's Challenge (Incredible Technologies, 2002)
- Big Buck Hunter II: Sportsman's Paradise (Incredible Technologies, 2002)
- Big Buck Hunter: Call Of The Wild (Incredible Technologies, 2005)
- Big Buck Hunter Pro (Raw Thrills, Inc., 2006)
- Big Buck Safari (Raw Thrills, Inc., 2008)
- Big Buck Hunter Pro Open Season (Raw Thrills, Inc., 2009)
- Big Buck World (Raw Thrills, Inc., 2010)
- Big Buck HD (Raw Thrills, Inc., 2012)
- Big Buck HD Wild (Raw Thrills, Inc., 2015)
- Big Buck Hunter Reloaded (Raw Thrills, Inc., 2020)
- Born To Fight (International Games, 1989)
- Bronx (Bootleg of the game Cycle Shooting, 1986)
- Bubble Trouble: Golly! Ghost! 2 (Namco, 1994)
- Bullet Mark (Sega, 1975)
- CarnEvil (Midway, 1998)
- Carnival King (Incredible Technologies, 2002)
- Cheyenne (Exidy, 1984)
- Chiller (Exidy, 1986)
- Clay Pigeon (Exidy, 1986)
- Claybuster (Taito, 1978)
- Combat / Catch-22 (Exidy, 1985)
- Confidential Mission (Sega of America, Inc., 2000)
- Cops (Atari, 1994)
- Cosmoswat (Namco, 1984)
- Crackshot (Exidy, 1985)
- Crazy Fight (Subsino, 1996)
- Crime Patrol (American Laser Games, 1993)
- Crime Patrol 2: Drug Wars (American Laser Games, 1993)
- Crisis Zone (Namco, 1999)
- Crossbow (Exidy, 1983)
- Crypt Killer (Konami, 1995)
- Cycle Shooting (Taito, 1986)
- Dead Eye (Konami 1996)
- Deadstorm Pirates (Namco, 2010)
- Deadstorm Pirates Special Edition (Namco, 2014)
- Death Crimson OX (Sega, 2000)
- Deer Hunting USA (Sammy USA, July 18, 2000)
- Desert Gun (Midway, 1977)
- Desert Patrol (Taito, 1977)
- Dragon Gun (Data East, 1993)
- Dream Raiders (Sega, 2012)
- Duck Hunt (Nintendo, 1984)
- Elevator Action Death Parade (Taito, 2008)
- Evil Night / Hell Night (Konami, 1998)
- Extreme Hunting (Atomiswave, 2005)
- Extreme Hunting 2 (Atomiswave, 2006)
- Far Cry: Paradise Lost (Ubisoft, 2007)
- Fast Draw Showdown (American Laser Games, 1994)
- Friction (Friction Game Studios, 2011)
- Gaia Attack 4 (Taito, 2010)
- Gallagher's Gallery (American Laser Games, 1992)
- Ghost Hunter (HanaHo Games, 1996)
- Ghost Squad (Sega, 2004)
- Ghost Squad Evolution (Sega, 2007)
- Ghoul Panic (Eighting/Raizing, 1999)
- Godzilla Kaiju Wars VR (Raw Thrills, 2024)
- Golgo 13 (Eighting/Raizing, 1999)
- Golgo 13 Kiseki No Dandou (Eighting/Raizing, 2000)
- Golly! Ghost! (Namco, 1990)
- Great Guns (Stern Electronics, 1983)
- Gun Champ (Taito, 1980)
- Gunblade NY (Sega, 1996)
- Gunbuster (Taito, 1992)
- Gunmania (Konami, 2000)
- Gunslinger Stratos (Square Enix, 2012)
- Gunslinger Stratos 2 (Square Enix, 2014)
- Halo Fireteam Raven (Raw Thrills, 2019)
- Hammer (Andamiro, 2000)
- Happy Hunter (Limenko, 2001)
- Hit 'n Miss (Exidy, 1987)
- Hogan's Alley (Nintendo, 1984)
- Host Invaders (Innovative Concepts in Entertainment, 1998)
- The House of the Dead (Sega, 1997)
- The House of the Dead 2 (Sega, 1998)
- The House of the Dead III (Sega, 2002)
- The House of the Dead 4 (Sega, 2005)
- The House of the Dead 4 Special (Sega, 2006)
- House of the Dead: Scarlet Dawn (Sega, 2018)
- Invasion: The Abductors (Midway, 1999)
- Johnny Nero: Action Hero (Innovative Concepts in Entertainment, 2004)
- John Wick: Continental Pursuit (Blue Motion Games, 2026)
- Judge Dredd (Acclaim, 1997)
- Jurassic Park (Sega, 1993)
- Jurassic Park Arcade (Raw Thrills, 2014)
- Jurassic Park III (Konami, 2001)
- Killer Shark (Sega, 1972)
- L.A. Machineguns (Sega, 1998)
- Laser Ghost (Sega, 1990)
- The Last Bounty Hunter (American Laser Games, 1994)
- Lethal Enforcers (Konami, October 14, 1992)
- Lethal Enforcers II: Gunfighters (Konami, March 1994)
- Lethal Enforcers 3 (Konami, November 2004)
- Lethal Justice (The Game Room, 1996)
- Let's Go Jungle!: Lost on the Island of Spice (Sega, June 27, 2006)
- Let's Go Jungle! Special (Sega, 2008)
- Let's Go Island: Lost on the Island of Tropics 3D (Sega, 2011)
- Line Of Fire / Bakudan Yarou (Sega, 1989)
- Locked 'n Loaded (Data East, 1994)
- Lord Of Gun (IGS, 1994)
- The Lost World: Jurassic Park (Sega, 1997)
- Lucky & Wild (Namco, 1993)
- Lupin the 3rd: The Shooting (Sega, 2001)
- Mad Dog McCree (American Laser Games, December 1990)
- Mad Dog II: The Lost Gold (American Laser Games, 1992)
- Mallet Madness (HanaHo Games, 1999)
- Manic Panic Ghosts (Sega, 2007)
- Marbella Vice (Picmatic, 1994)
- Maximum Force (Atari Games, 1997)
- The Maze of the Kings (Sega, 2002)
- Mechanized Attack (SNK, 1989)
- Mobile Suit Gundam Final Shooting (Banpresto, 1995)
- Mobile Suit Gundam: Spirits of Zeon ~Dual Stars of Carnage~ (Banpresto, 2006)
- Mobile Suit Gundam: Spirits of Zeon ~Memory of Soldiers~ (Banpresto, 2007)
- Monster Eye (IGS, 2014)
- Monster Eye 2 (IGS, 2018)
- Music GunGun! 2 (Taito, 2011)
- Nerf Arcade (Raw Thrills, 2019)
- N.Y. Captor (Taito, 1985)
- Ninja Assault (Namco, November 18, 2000)
- The Ocean Hunter (Sega, 1998)
- One Shot One Kill (Promat, 1996)
- Operation G.H.O.S.T. (Sega, 18 April 2012)
- Operation Thunder Hurricane (Konami, 1996)
- Operation Thunderbolt (Taito, 1988)
- Operation Tiger (Taito, 1998)
- Operation Wolf 3 (Taito, 1994)
- Operation Wolf (Taito, 1987)
- Panic Museum / Haunted Museum (Taito, 2010)
- Panic Museum 2 / Shh...! Welcome to Frightfearland / Haunted Museum II: Youkoso Gen'ei Yuuenchi he (Taito, 2011)
- Point Blank (Namco, 1994)
- Point Blank 2 (Namco, 1999)
- Point Blank 3 (Namco, 2000)
- Point Blank X (Namco, 2016)
- Police 911 (Konami, 2000)
- Police 911 2 (Konami, 2001)
- Police Trainer (P&P Marketing, 1996)
- Police Trainer 2 (Team Play Inc., 2003)
- Pop Shot (Dynamo, 1991)
- P's Attack (IGS, 2004)
- Rabbids Hollywood (Adrenaline Amusements, 2018)
- Rail Chase (Sega, 1991)
- Rail Chase 2 (Sega, 1995)
- Rambo (Sega, 2008)
- Ranger Mission (Sammy, 2004)
- Rapid Fire (HanaHo Games, 1998)
- Razing Storm (Namco, 2009)
- Revolution X (Midway, 1994)
- Sea Devil (Sega, 1972)
- Sega Clay Challenge (Sega, 2008)
- Sega Golden Gun (Sega Shanghai Software, 2010)
- Shh...! Welcome to Frightfearland (Global VR, 2011)
- Sharpshooter (P&P Marketing, 1998)
- Shoot Away (Namco, 1977)
- Shoot The Bear (Seeburg, 1949)
- Shooting Gallery (Seatongrove Ltd (Zaccaria license), 1984)
- Shooting Master (Sega, 1985)
- Shootout at Old Tucson (American Laser Games, 1994)
- Silent Hill: The Arcade (Konami, 2007)
- Silent Scope (Konami, 1999)
- Silent Scope 2 (Konami, 2000)
- Silent Scope EX (Konami, 2001)
- Silent Scope: Bone-Eater (Konami, 2014)
- Skeet Shot (Dynamo, 1991)
- Space Gun (Taito, 1990)
- Space Invaders Frenzy (Raw Thrills, 2017)
- Space Pirates (American Laser Games, 1992)
- Special Forces Elite Training (ICE/Play Mechanix, 2002)
- Sports Shooting USA (Sammy, 2003)
- Star Trek: Voyager The Arcade Game (Team Play, 2002)
- Steel Gunner (Namco, 1990)
- Steel Gunner 2 (Namco, 1991)
- The Swarm (Global VR, 2014)
- Target Hits (Gaelco, 1994)
- Target: Terror (Raw Thrills, 2004)
- Teraburst (Konami, 1999)
- Terminator Salvation (Raw Thrills, 2010)
- Terminator 2: Judgment Day (Midway, 1991)
- Tickee Tickats (Raster Elite, 1994)
- Time Crisis (Namco, 1995)
- Time Crisis II (Namco, 1997)
- Time Crisis 3 (Namco, 2002)
- Time Crisis 4 (Namco, 2006)
- Time Crisis 5 (Namco, 2015)
- Tomb Raider (Adrenaline Amusements, 2018)
- Total Vice (Konami, 1997)
- Transformers: Human Alliance (Sega, 2013)
- Transformers: Shadow Rising (Sega, 2018)
- Triple Hunt (Atari, 1977)
- Trophy Hunting: Bear & Moose (Sammy USA, June 30, 2003)
- Turkey Hunting USA (American Sammy Corporation, July 20, 2001)
- Turkey Shoot (Williams, 1984)
- Tut's Tomb (Island Design, 1996)
- Under Fire (Taito, 1993)
- Vampire Night (Namco/Sega/Wow Entertainment, 2000)
- Virtua Cop (Sega, 1994)
- Virtua Cop 2 (Sega, 1995)
- Virtua Cop 3 (Sega, 2003)
- Virtual Combat (VR8 Inc., 1993)
- Vs. Duck Hunt (Nintendo Vs. System, 1984)
- Vs. Freedom Force (Nintendo Vs. System, 1988)
- Vs. Hogan's Alley (Nintendo Vs. System, 1984)
- Warzaid (Konami, 2003)
- Who Dunit (Exidy, 1988)
- Who Shot Johnny Rock? (American Laser Games, 1991)
- Wild Gunman (Nintendo, 1974)
- Wild Gunman (Nintendo, 1984)
- Wild Pilot (Jaleco, 1992)
- Wing Shooting Championship (Sammy USA, December 31, 2002)
- World Combat (Konami, 2003)
- Zero Point (Unico, 1998)
- Zero Point 2 (Unico, 1999)
- Zombie Raid (American Sammy, 1995)
- Zorton Brothers (Web Picmatic, 1993)

== 3DO Company ==
=== 3DO Interactive Multiplayer ===
- Corpse Killer
- Crime Patrol 2: Drug Wars
- Crime Patrol
- Demolition Man
- The Last Bounty Hunter
- Mad Dog McCree
- Mad Dog II: The Lost Gold
- Space Pirates
- Who Shot Johnny Rock

== Amstrad ==
=== Amstrad CPC ===
Gunstick CPC games:

- A-Team, The Gunstick 1988 Zafiro
- Bestial Warrior Gunstick 1989 Dinamic
- Guillermo Tell Gunstick 1989 Opera Soft
- Mike Gunner Gunstick 1988 Dinamic
- Solo Gunstick 1989 Opera Soft
- Space Smugglers Gunstick 1989 MHT Ingenieros
- Target Plus Gunstick 1988 Dinamic
- Trigger Gunstick 1989 Opera Soft

Magnum CPC games:

- Bullseye Magnum 19?? Macsen
- Missile Ground Zero Magnum 1989 Mastertronic
- Operation Wolf Magnum 1989 Ocean
- Robot Attack Magnum 1990 Mastertronic
- Rookie Magnum 1989 Mastertronic
- Solar Invasion Magnum 1990 Mastertronic

Trojan (CPC Plus) games:

- Skeet Shoot Trojan 199? Trojan
- Enforcer, The Trojan 199? Trojan

Westphaser (CPC) games:

- Crazy Shot Westphaser
- Steve McQueen Westphaser 1992 Loriciel
- West Phaser Westphaser 1989 Loriciel

Unconfirmed CPC games:

- American Turbo King Magnum? 1989 Mastertronic
- Billy The Kid Magnum? 1990 Mastertronic
- Bronx Street Cop Magnum? 1989 Mastertronic
- F-16 Fighting Falcon Magnum? 1989 Sorcery/Codemasters
- Jungle Warfare Magnum? 1989 Mastertronic
- Space Harrier II

== APF ==
=== APF TV Fun Model 402 ===
- Skeet Shoot
- Target Shoot with Pistol

== Arcade1Up ==
=== Big Buck World ===
- Big Buck Hunter Pro
- Big Buck Hunter Pro Open Season
- Big Buck Safari
- Big Buck Safari Outback

=== Big Buck World Classic ===
- Big Buck Hunter Pro
- Big Buck Hunter Pro Open Season
- Big Buck Safari
- Big Buck Safari Outback

=== Big Buck Hunter Pro Deluxe ===
- Big Buck Hunter Pro
- Big Buck Hunter Pro Open Season
- Big Buck Safari
- Big Buck Safari Outback

=== Terminator 2 ===
- Terminator 2: Judgement Day *

=== Time Crisis Deluxe ===
- Time Crisis
- Point Blank
- Steel Gunner *
- Steel Gunner 2 *

* Unlike the original arcade release, this port uses absolute tracking instead of relative tracking. Because of this, mounted light-guns are no longer a requirement to play this version

== ASCII ==
=== MSX ===
"Plus-X" Terminator Laser

- Air Hockey
- Duck Hunt
- Dungeon Hunter
- Pig Race
- Shooting Collection

Gun-Stick

- The A Team (Gunstick version)
- Bestial Warrior (Gunstick version)
- Cosmic Sheriff (Gunstick version)
- Duck Hunt
- Guillermo Tell (Gunstick version)
- Mike Gunner (Gunstick version)
- Solo (Gunstick version)
- Scotland (Gunstick version)
- Space Smugglers (Gunstick version)
- Target Plus (Gunstick version)
- Trigger (Gunstick version)

== Atari ==
=== Atari 2600 ===
- Sentinel
- Shooting Arcade (unreleased)
- Bobby needs Food (homebrew)

=== Atari 7800 ===
- Alien Brigade
- Barnyard Blaster
- Crossbow
- Meltdown
- Sentinel

=== Atari 8-bit computers ===
- Barnyard Blaster
- Bug Hunt
- Crossbow
- Cementerio
- Crime buster
- GangstersVille
- Operation Blood

=== Atari ST ===
Trojan Light Phazer

- Cyber Assault (Trojan, 1991)
- Die Hard II: Die Harder (Grandslam, 1992)
- Firestar (Trojan, 1991)
- Orbital Destroyer (Trojan, 1991)
- Skeet Shoot (Trojan, 1991)
- Space Gun (Ocean, 1992)
- The Enforcer (Trojan, 1991)

Loriciel Phaser (West Phaser) light gun

- West Phaser (Loriciel, 1989)
- Crazy Shot (Loriciel, 1989)

== Betron ==
=== Video Gun ===
- Shoot - No.1
- Shoot - No.2

== Binatone ==
=== Binatone TV Master Mk 6 ===
- Shooting
- Target

=== Binatone Colour TV Game Mk 6 ===
- Shooting
- Target

== Coleco ==
=== Coleco Telstar Ranger ===
- Skeet
- Target

=== Coleco Telstar Arcade ===
- Quick Draw (Cartridge 1)
- Target (Cartridge 2)
- Shooting Gallery (Cartridge 3)
- Shoot the Bear (Cartridge 3)
- Blast Away (Cartridge 4)

=== Coleco Telstar Marksman ===
- Skeet
- Target

== Commodore ==
=== Commodore 64 ===
Gun Stick

- Mike Gunner
- Target Plus

Magnum Light Phaser

- Army Days
- Baby Blues
- Blaze-Out

- RoboCop
- Combat School
- Hyper Sports
- Platoon
- Rambo III

- Cosmic Storm
- Duck Hunt
- Gangster
- Ghost Town
- GooseBusters
- Gunslinger
- Hit the Buttons
- Operation Thunderbolt
- Operation Wolf
- Time Traveller

Stack Light Rifle

- Cosmic Commando
- Glorious Twelfth aka Grouse Shoot
- High Noon Shootout
- Hit the Buttons
- Indian Attack
- Prohibition
- Shooting Gallery
- Shootin' Putin
- Smack a Mole
- Starbase Defence

Other

- Multi-purpose Arcade Combat Simulator (Not commercially released, training software developed for and used by the U.S. military.)

=== Amiga ===
Actionware Phazer

- Capone (Actionware, 1988)
- Creature (Actionware, 1989)
- Operation Thunderbolt (Ocean, 1989) *
- Operation Wolf (Ocean, 1988) *
- P.O.W. (Actionware, 1988)
- Sideshow (Actionware, 1988)

Golem light gun

- Worldwide hunting (Golem, 1992)
- Gateway Ypsilon (Golem, 1991)
- Championship Shooting (Golem, 1992)
- Master Of The Town (Golem, 1990)

Loriciel (West Phaser) light gun

- Crazy Shot (Loriciel, 1989)
- West Phaser (Loriciel, 1989)

Trojan Light Phazer

- Aliex (Trojan, 1990)
- Cyber Assault (Trojan, 1991)
- Die Hard 2 (Grandslam, 1992)
- Enforcer, The (Trojan, 1991)
- Firestar (Trojan, 1991)
- Operation Thunderbolt (Ocean, 1989) *
- Operation Wolf (Ocean, 1988) *
- Orbital Destroyer (Trojan, 1990)
- Skeet Shoot (Trojan, 1991)
- Space Gun (Ocean, 1992)

* Amiga game, which doesn't originally support lightgun, but later modified version for WHDLoad exists

== Hanimex ==
=== 667CG / 667CIP / 667CP ===
- Moving (Rebound) Target
- Straight Line Target

=== 7771G ===
- Moving Target
- Straight Line Target

=== 8881 Color TV Game ===
- Moving Target
- Straight Line Target

== iiRcade ==
* Online services with iiRcade were permanently shut down on June 23, 2023.

- Operation Wolf
- Operation Thunderbolt

== Magnavox ==
=== Magnavox Odyssey ===
- Shooting Gallery

- Shootout (game card #9)
- Dogfight (game card #9)
- Prehistoric Safari (game card #9)
- Shooting Gallery (game card #10)

== Microsoft ==
=== MS-DOS ===
- A.D Cop
- A.D Cop Overseas Mission
- Bon Bon Paradise
- Chaos Control
- Creature Shock
- Crime Patrol
- Crime Patrol 2: Drug Wars
- Duck Hunt
- Guillermo Tell
- The Last Bounty Hunter
- Operation Wolf
- Mad Dog McCree
- Mad Dog II: The Lost Gold
- Mike Gunner
- Mystic Midway: Phantom Express
- Mystic Midway: Rest in Pieces
- Soldier Boyz
- Space Pirates
- Who Shot Johnny Rock?

=== Windows ===
- Area 51
- Art is Dead (2001, Small Rockets)
- BangBang PewPew
- Banzai Escape
- Big Buck Hunter Arcade
- Big Buck Hunter Pro Adventure
- BioCrisis
- BioCrisis: Return 2 the Lab
- Blue Estate The Game
- Burn Cycle
- Cabela's African Adventures (2013) (includes light-gun galleries)
- Cabela's Dangerous Hunts 2013 (includes light-gun galleries)
- Chicken Shoot
- Corpse Killer: 25th Anniversary Edition
- Crime Patrol 2: Drug Wars
- Crypt Killer (Japan only)
- Cytoclash
- Dead Containment
- Death Live
- Die Hard Trilogy

- Die Hard 2: Die Harder

- Die Hard Trilogy 2: Viva Las Vegas

- Arcade Mode - Sharpshooting, and Movie Mode Sharpshooting segments only

- Die to Survive
- Ed Hunter
- Epoch
- Fast Draw Showdown
- Gal*Gun Returns
- Gal*Gun: Double Peace
- Grand Shooter
- Gunslinger Stratos: Reloaded
- Heavy Fire: Afghanistan
- Heavy Fire: Shattered Spear
- The House of the Dead
- The House of the Dead 2
- The House of the Dead III
- The Typing of the Dead: Overkill (includes The House of the Dead: Overkill)

- The House of the Dead: Overkill

- The House of the Dead: Remake
- The House of the Dead 2: Remake
- The Last Bounty Hunter
- Mad Bullets
- Mad Dog McCree
- Mad Dog II: The Lost Gold
- Major Mayhem
- Maximum Force
- Nerf Jr. Foam Blaster: Attack of the Kleptons!
- Ninja Reflex (includes light-gun galleries)
- Operation Wolf Returns: First Mission
- Pip Pip!
- Pixel Crisis
- Railbreak
- Rambo: The Video Game
- Reload
- Remington Super Slam Hunting Africa
- Remington Super Slam Hunting Alaska
- Soldier Boyz
- Space Pirates
- Touhou Crisis
- Toy Story Mania!
- Trigger Happy (muusi)
- Until The Last Bullet
- Virtua Cop aka Virtua Squad (North American PC release)
- Virtua Cop 2 aka Virtua Squad 2 (North American PC release)
- Virtual Soldiers
- Who Shot Johnny Rock?
- Zombie Desperation
- Zombie Panic in Wonderland

=== Xbox ===
- The House of the Dead III (also contains an unlockable port of The House of the Dead 2)

- The House of the Dead 2
- The House of the Dead III

- Silent Scope Complete

- Silent Scope
- Silent Scope 2
- Silent Scope EX
- Silent Scope 3

- Starsky & Hutch (player 2 only)

Some Sega Chihiro titles are installable on a modified Xbox, as the two share nearly identical hardware. So far, only Virtua Cop 3 supports light-gun controllers via this installation method.

- Ghost Squad (2004) (unplayable using light-gun. Controller only)
- Virtua Cop 3

=== Xbox 360 ===
The Xbox 360 supports the Top-Shot Elite by Red Octane, the Top Shot Fearmaster, and the Top Shot Sport (Kinect light-gun), as well as motion controls through the Kinect as light gun peripherals.

light-gun games

- Blackwater (Kinect Motion Controls)
- Cabela's North American Adventures (2010) (Top Shot Elite) (includes light-gun galleries)
- Cabela's Adventure Camp (2011) (Kinect motion controls) (includes light-gun galleries)
- Cabela's Big Game Hunter: Hunting Party (2011) (Top Shot Sport + Kinect)
- Cabela's Dangerous Hunts 2011 (Top Shot Elite) (includes light-gun galleries)
- Cabela's Survival: Shadows of Katmai (2011) (Top Shot Elite) (includes light-gun galleries)
- Cabela's Big Game Hunter 2012 (Top Shot Elite) (includes light-gun galleries)
- Cabela's African Adventures (2013) (Top Shot Elite, Top Shot Fearmaster) (includes light-gun galleries)
- Cabela's Dangerous Hunts 2013 (Top Shot Elite, Top Shot Fearmaster) (includes light-gun galleries)
- Child of Eden (Kinect motion controls)
- Toy Story Mania! (Kinect motion controls)

Party Games with rail shooter/shooting gallery sections

- London 2012 (Kinect motion controls)
- Rabbids: Alive and Kicking (Kinect motion controls)

FPS games

- Cabela's North American Adventures (2010) (Top Shot Elite)
- Cabela's Dangerous Hunts 2011 (Top Shot Elite)
- Cabela's Big Game Hunter 2012 (Top Shot Elite)
- Cabela's Dangerous Hunts 2013 (Top Shot Elite, Top Shot Fearmaster)
- Cabela's Big Game Hunter: Pro Hunts (2014) (Top Shot Elite, Top Shot Fearmaster)

non-traditional light-gun games

- Cabela's Survival: Shadows of Katmai (2011) (Top Shot Elite)
- Cabela's Hunting Expeditions (2012) (Top Shot Elite, Top Shot Fearmaster)
- Cabela's African Adventures (2013) (Top Shot Elite, Top Shot Fearmaster)
- The Gunstringer (Kinect motion controls)
- MIB: Alien Crisis (Top Shot Elite)

The Xbox 360 port of Attack of the Movies 3D uniquely has built-in support for mounted-light-gun controllers with how it calculates position rather than velocity from joystick inputs. This feature was never fully realized however as no light-gun peripheral was ever released for the platform that mimicked joystick inputs this way.

=== Xbox One ===
The Xbox One supports the Mars Lightcon by PDP and Microsoft's Kinect motion tracking sensor as light-gun peripherals.

- Blue Estate (Kinect motion controls)
- Big Buck Hunter Arcade (Mars)
- The House of the Dead: Remake (Xbox One only, computer-mouse-based lightguns)
- Qubit's Quest (Mars)
- Voyage of the Dead (Mars)

Party Games with rail shooter/shooting gallery sections

- Kinect Sports Rivals (Kinect motion controls)

== Mobile Games ==
=== iOS ===
- Time Crisis 2nd Strike (iGunCon) (supports using another iOS device as a light-gun via the iGunCon app)

== Nintendo ==
=== Nintendo Entertainment System ===
- 3-in-1 Super Mario Bros. / Duck Hunt / World Class Track Meet

- Duck Hunt

- The Adventures of Bayou Billy

- Gun Shootin' Stages - Stage 2, and Stage 7

- Baby Boomer
- Barker Bill's Trick Shooting
- Chiller
- Cobra Mission
- Crime Busters
- Duck Hunt
- Freedom Force
- Gotcha! The Sport!
- Gumshoe
- Hogan's Alley
- Hit Marmot
- Laser Invasion (contains light-gun segment)
- The Lone Ranger (contains light-gun sequences)
- Mechanized Attack
- Operation Wolf
- Shooting Range
- Space Shadow (Hyper Shot only) (includes force feedback and sound effects via the Hyper Shot that are exclusive to this game)
- Strike Wolf
- Supergun 3-in-1
- Super Mario Bros. / Duck Hunt

- Duck Hunt

- To The Earth
- Track & Field II (Bonus Game: Gun Firing)
- Wild Gunman

=== Super Nintendo Entertainment System ===
The SNES supports the use of two different light-gun controllers: Nintendo's Super Scope wireless light-gun, and Konami's Justifier wired light-gun. All games listed support the Super Scope unless otherwise noted.

- Battle Clash
- Bazooka Blitzkrieg
- The Hunt for Red October (used for bonus games)
- Lamborghini American Challenge (used for a bonus mode)
- Lemmings 2: The Tribes (Easter egg)
- Lethal Enforcers (Justifier only)
- Multi-purpose Arcade Combat Simulator (Not commercially released, training software developed for and used by the U.S. military. Used a unique M16 MACS replica rifle)
- Metal Combat: Falcon's Revenge
- Operation Thunderbolt
- Super Scope 6

- Blastris A
- Blastris B
- Blastris Mole Patrol
- Lazer Blazer Type A: Intercept
- Lazer Blazer Type B: Engage
- Lazer Blazer Type C: Confront

- Terminator 2: The Arcade Game
- Tin Star
- X-Zone
- Yoshi's Safari

=== Wii ===
The Wii is unique in that its standard controller can be used as a gun controller. Though a number of Wii games do not support these capabilities, those which do form an exhaustively long list of games, many of which have no resemblance to traditional light-gun games. Thus, this section will only include games that either explicitly support the Wii Zapper or are rail shooters in nature. Virtual Console ports, such as Operation Wolf, did not include any amount of light gun support.

No unique light-gun peripheral is required to play any Wii light-gun or light-gun adjacent game. All titles will work with the standard Wii remote or Wii remote and nunchuck controllers. Licensed and unlicensed light-gun cradle attachments are also compatible with these controllers if needed.

light-gun games

- Arcade Shooting Gallery
- Army Rescue
- Attack of the Movies 3D
- Bass Pro Shops: The Hunt (includes light-gun galleries)
- Bass Pro Shops: The Hunt - Trophy Showdown (includes light-gun galleries)
- Big Buck Hunter Pro
- Big Town Shootout (WiiWare)
- Buck Fever
- Cabela's Big Game Hunter 2010 (includes light-gun galleries)
- Cabela's Monster Buck Hunter (2010) (includes light-gun galleries)
- Cabela's North American Adventures (2010) (includes light-gun galleries)
- Cabela's Adventure Camp (2011) (includes light-gun galleries)
- Cabela's Dangerous Hunts 2011 (includes light-gun galleries)
- Cabela's Dangerous Hunts 2011: Special Edition (includes light-gun galleries)
- Cabela's Big Game Hunter 2012 (includes light-gun galleries)
- Cabela's African Adventures (2013) (includes light-gun galleries)
- Cabela's Dangerous Hunts 2013 (includes light-gun galleries)
- Carnival King (WiiWare)
- Chicken Blaster
- Chicken Riot
- Chicken Shoot
- Cocoto Festival (Europe only)
- Cocoto Magic Circus
- Dead Space: Extraction
- Deer Captor (WiiWare)
- Deer Drive
- Deer Drive Legends (WiiWare)
- Dino Strike
- Eco-Shooter: Plant 530 (WiiWare)
- Fast Draw Showdown (WiiWare)
- Ghost Squad (2007)
- Gunblade NY and L.A. Machineguns Arcade Hits Pack

- Gunblade NY
- L.A. Machine Guns

- Gunslingers (aka Western Heroes)
- Heavy Fire: Special Operations (WiiWare)
- Heavy Fire: Black Arms (WiiWare)
- Heavy Fire: Afghanistan
- The House of the Dead 2 & 3 Return

- The House of the Dead 2
- The House of the Dead III

- The House of the Dead: Overkill
- Link's Crossbow Training (bundled with Wii Zapper)
- Mad Dog McCree: Gunslinger Pack

- Mad Dog McCree
- Mad Dog II: The Lost Gold
- The Last Bounty Hunter

- Martian Panic
- Medal of Honor: Heroes 2

- Arcade mode

- Nerf N-Strike: Double Blast Bundle

- Nerf N-Strike
- Nerf N-Strike Elite

- Pheasants Forever: Wingshooter aka Pheasants Forever
- Pirate Blast
- Pop (WiiWare)
- Reload
- Remington Great American Bird Hunt
- Remington Super Slam Hunting: Africa
- Remington Super Slam Hunting: Alaska
- Remington Super Slam Hunting: North America
- Resident Evil: The Darkside Chronicles
- Resident Evil: The Umbrella Chronicles
- Robin Hood: The Return of Richard (WiiWare)
- Solvalou (WiiVC) (Japan Only)
- Starblade (WiiVC) (Japan Only)
- Target: Terror
- Top Shot Arcade
- Top Shot Dinosaur Hunter (includes light-gun galleries)
- Toy Story Mania!
- Wicked Monsters Blast!
- Wild West Guns (WiiWare)
- Wild West Shootout

Party Games with rail shooter/shooting gallery sections

- Carnival Games
- Chuck E. Cheese's Party Games
- Chuck E. Cheese's Sports Games
- Chuck E. Cheese's Super Collection
- EA Playground
- Goosebumps Horrorland
- Mario & Sonic at the Olympic Games

- Shooting: Skeet

- Movie Games
- New Carnival Games
- Rayman Raving Rabbids
- Rayman Raving Rabbids 2
- Rayman Raving Rabbids TV Party
- Sega Superstars Tennis

- Virtua Squad (mini-game)
- Space Harrier (mini-game)

- Six Flags Fun Park
- Thrillville Off the Rails
- WarioWare: Smooth Moves

- Can Shooter

- Wii Play

- Shooting Range

- Wonder World Amusement Park
- World Party Games

3rd person rail-shooters

- Counter Force
- Horizon Riders (WiiWare)
- Sin & Punishment: Star Successor
- Tom Clancy's Ghost Recon (2010)
- WarMen Tactics (WiiWare)
- Zombie Panic in Wonderland (WiiWare)

FPS games

- 007 Quantum of Solace
- Bass Pro Shops: The Hunt
- Bass Pro Shops: The Hunt - Trophy Showdown
- Brothers in Arms: Double Time

- Brothers in Arms: Road to Hill 30
- Brothers in Arms: Earned in Blood

- Cabela's Trophy Bucks (2007)
- Cabela's Legendary Adventures (2008)
- Cabela's Outdoor Adventures (2009)
- Cabela's Dangerous Hunts 2009
- Cabela's Big Game Hunter 2010
- Cabela's Monster Buck Hunter (2010)
- Cabela's North American Adventures (2010)
- Cabela's Dangerous Hunts 2011
- Cabela's Dangerous Hunts 2011: Special Edition
- Cabela's Big Game Hunter 2012
- Cabela's Dangerous Hunts 2013
- Call of Duty 3
- Call of Duty: Modern Warfare - Reflex Edition
- Call of Duty: World at War
- Call of Duty: Black Ops
- Call of Duty: Modern Warfare 3
- The Conduit
- Conduit 2
- Elebits
- Far Cry: Vengeance
- GoldenEye 007 (2010 video game)
- Greg Hastings Paintball 2
- The History Channel: Battle for the Pacific
- Hunting Challenge
- Jurassic: The Hunted
- Marines: Modern Urban Combat
- Medal of Honor: Heroes 2
- Medal of Honor: Vanguard
- Metroid Prime: Trilogy (difficult to reach all buttons using standard Wii gun-cradle grip. Cobalt Flux Dark Ops Wii gun accessory recommended for a pistol grip with a trigger if needed)

- Metroid Prime
- Metroid Prime 2: Echoes
- Metroid Prime 3

- NPPL Championship Paintball 2009
- Onslaught (WiiWare)
- Real Heroes: Firefighter
- Red Steel
- Red Steel 2
- Spy Games Elevator Mission
- Top Shot Dinosaur Hunter
- Water Warfare (WiiWare)

non-traditional light-gun games

- All Round Hunter
- Army Men: Soldiers of Misfortune
- Battle Rage: Mech Conflict
- Battle Rage: The Robot Wars
- Bionicle Heroes
- Blood Beach (WiiWare)
- Cabela's Big Game Hunter (2007)
- Cabela's Survival: Shadows of Katmai (2011)
- Cabela's Hunting Expeditions (2012)
- Cabela's African Adventures (2013)
- Canada Hunt
- Centipede Infestation
- Code Lyoko: Quest for Infinity
- Dead Rising: Chop Till You Drop
- Destroy All Humans! Big Willy Unleashed
- Disney's Chicken Little: Ace in Action
- Epic Mickey 2: The Power of Two
- Ghostbusters: The Video Game
- Incoming! (WiiWare)
- Iron Man 2
- MIB: Alien Crisis
- Mathews Bow Hunting
- Ninja Reflex
- North American Hunting Extravaganza
- North American Hunting Extravaganza 2
- Overturn (WiiWare)
- Pikmin
- Pikmin 2
- Racers' Islands: Crazy Arenas (WiiWare)
- Racers' Islands: Crazy Racers (WiiWare)
- Resident Evil 4: Wii Edition
- Rodea the Sky Soldier
- Rogue Trooper: Quartz Zone Massacre
- Samurai Warriors: Katana
- Scarface: The World is Yours
- Shootanto: Evolutionary Mayhem (WiiWare)
- Ski and Shoot
- Sneezies (WiiWare)
- Sniper Elite
- Tom Clancy's Splinter Cell: Double Agent
- Tomb Raider: Anniversary
- Transformers: Cybertron Adventures
- Ultimate Duck Hunting
- Veggy World
- Wii Play: Motion

- Trigger Twist

cancelled Wii light-gun games

- The Grinder (FPS game)

=== Wii U ===
The Wii U supports all of the same wireless IR tracking controllers and peripherals that the Wii uses for light-gun games, as well as the Wii U GamePad for some rail-shooters.

light-gun games

- The Adventures of Bayou Billy (Wii U VC only) (Wii Remote)

- Gun Shootin' Stages - Stage 2, and Stage 7

- Cocoto Magic Circus 2
- Cabela's Dangerous Hunts 2013 (includes light-gun galleries)
- Duck Hunt (Wii U VC only)
- Hogan's Alley (Wii U VC only)
- Wicked Monsters Blast! HD PLUS
- Wild Gunman (Wii U VC only)

Party Games with rail shooter/shooting gallery sections

- Game Party Champions
- Family Party: 30 Great Games Obstacle Course

FPS games

- Cabela's Dangerous Hunts 2013
- Cabela's Big Game Hunter: Pro Hunts (2014)
- Call of Duty: Black Ops II
- Call of Duty: Ghosts
- ZombiU

- King of Zombies (player 2 only)
non-traditional light-gun games

- Epic Mickey 2: The Power of Two
- Nintendo Land

- Metroid Blast
- The Legend of Zelda: Battle Quest (Wii U GamePad, player 1 only)
- Takamaru's Ninja Castle (Wii U GamePad)

- Pikmin 3

=== Nintendo Switch ===
The Nintendo Switch supports the Joy-Con controllers for gyroscope-based aim tracking. Licensed and unlicensed Light-gun styled gun controller cradles were also released for the Joy-Con controllers, such as the Bullseye Pro gun cradle included with Cabela's: The Hunt Championship Edition.

light-gun games

- Assault ChaingunS KM
- Cabela's: The Hunt - Championship Edition (includes light-gun galleries)
- Crazy Chicken Xtreme
- Chicken Range
- Clubhouse Games: 51 Worldwide Classics

- 46 - Shooting Range

- Dead Z Meat
- Duck Quack Shoot
- Gal*Gun: Double Peace
- The House of the Dead: Remake
- The House of the Dead 2: Remake
- Mad Bullets
- Martian Panic
- Moorhun Invasion: Crazy Chicken Invasion
- Moorhun Pirates: Crazy Chicken Pirates
- Moorhun Remake
- Moorhun Wanted
- Moorhun X: Crazy Chicken X
- Spooky Spirit Shooting Gallery
- S.N.I.P.E.R. - Hunter Scope
- Until The Last Bullet

FPS games

- Metroid Prime Remastered

non-traditional light-gun games

- Western 1849 Reloaded

== Philips ==
=== CD-i ===
- Crime Patrol
- Crime Patrol 2: Drug Wars
- Mad Dog McCree
- Mad Dog II: The Lost Gold
- The Last Bounty Hunter
- Thunder in Paradise
- Who Shot Johnny Rock

== Plug & Play ==
=== Hasbro ===
- Mission: Paintball
- Mission: Paintball Powered Up
- Mission: Paintball Trainer
- Star Wars: Clone Trooper Blaster

=== Jakks Pacific ===
- Big Buck Hunter Pro
- Big Buck Safari
- Duck Commander
- Star Wars: Blaster Strike
- Star Wars: Clone Trooper
- Toy Story Mania! Point 'N Shoot
- The Walking Dead: Battleground
- The Walking Dead: Zombie Hunter

=== Play TV ===
- Buckmasters Huntin'
- Buckmasters Huntin' 2
- Huntin' 3

=== Radica ===
- Menacer (Sega Genesis SOC console with internal 'Menacer 6-game cartridge' game)

=== Takara ===
- Gun Gun Adventure
- Gun Gun Revolution

=== Tiger Electronics ===
- Lazer Tag Video Game Module (requires Phoenix LTX blaster to operate)

=== ToyQuest ===
- Power Rangers Dino Thunder: Dino Action

=== WayForward ===
- Teenage Mutant Ninja Turtles: Mutant & Monster Mayhem

=== SDW Games ===
- Operation: Cobra Strike

== RadioShack ==
=== Electronic TV Scoreboard 60-3061 ===
- Target
- Skeet

== Sega ==
=== Master System ===
- Assault City
- Gangster Town
- Laser Ghost
- Marksman Shooting (included in compilations: "Marksman Shooting & Trap Shooting" and "Marksman Shooting/Trap Shooting/Safari Hunt")
- Missile Defense 3-D
- Operation Wolf
- Rambo III
- Rescue Mission
- Safari Hunt (included in compilations: "Hang on & Safari Hunt", "Marksman Shooting & Trap Shooting" and "Marksman Shooting/Trap Shooting/Safari Hunt")
- Shooting Gallery
- Space Gun
- Trap Shooting (included in compilations: "Marksman Shooting & Trap Shooting" and "Marksman Shooting/Trap Shooting/Safari Hunt")
- Wanted

Unreleased Sega Master System light-gun games:

- 3D Gunner (unreleased prototype rom exists, believed to be an early development version of Missile Defense 3-D)

=== Genesis, Sega CD, and 32X ===
The Sega Genesis and its add-ons support three different types of light-guns, the wireless Menacer light-gun by Sega, Konami's wired Justifier light-gun, and American Laser Games' GameGun.

- Body Count (Menacer)
- Corpse Killer (CD, CD 32X) (Menacer or GameGun)
- Crime Patrol (CD) (Menacer, Justifier or GameGun)
- Lethal Enforcers (Justifier)
- Lethal Enforcers (CD) (Justifier)
- Lethal Enforcers II: Gun Fighters (Justifier)
- Lethal Enforcers II: Gun Fighters (CD) (Justifier)
- Mad Dog McCree (CD) (Menacer, Justifier or GameGun)
- Mad Dog II: The Lost Gold (CD) (Menacer, Justifier or GameGun)
- Menacer 6-game cartridge (Menacer)

- Ready, Aim, Tomatoes!
- Rockman's Zone
- Space Station Defender
- Whack Ball
- Front Line
- Pest Control

- Snatcher (CD) (Justifier) (contains light-gun sequences)
- Terminator 2: The Arcade Game (Menacer)
- Who Shot Johnny Rock (CD) (Menacer, Justifier or GameGun)

Unreleased Sega Genesis, Sega CD and Sega CD 32X light-gun games:

- Battle Mission
- Crime Patrol 2: Drug Wars (CD)
- Die Hard Trilogy (Genesis and 32X)
- Monster Hunter
- Space Pirates (CD)

=== Saturn ===
- Area 51
- Chaos Control (Europe only) aka Chaos Control Remix (Japan only) (Not to be confused with the first Japanese release named "Chaos Control" which had no lightgun support)
- Crypt Killer
- Daisuki (contains light-gun sequences)
- Death Crimson
- Die Hard Trilogy

- Die Hard 2: Die Harder

- The House of the Dead
- Kochira Katsushikaku Kamearikouenmae Hashutsujo Nakagawa Land Dai Race! no Maki (contains light-gun sequences)
- Mighty Hits (Japan and Europe only)
- Maximum Force
- Mechanical Violator Hakaider (Japan only)
- Policenauts (contains light-gun sequences)
- Scud the Disposable Assassin

- Single Gun (player 1 or player 2)
- Dual Gun (player 1 and/or player 2)

- Virtua Cop
- Virtua Cop 2

=== Dreamcast ===
- Confidential Mission
- Death Crimson 2
- Death Crimson OX
- Demolition Racer: No Exit (Unlockable in the mini game 'Big Car Hunter', one of only two American released games which worked with the official Sega light gun, released only in Asia and Europe)
- The House of the Dead 2 US version doesn't work with the original Dreamcast Lightgun, only with third-party guns.
- Sega Smash Pack (contains Virtua Cop 2)

- Virtua Cop 2

- Virtua Cop 2 (Japan only)

List of cancelled Dreamcast gun games:

- The House of the Dead III
- The Lost World: Jurassic Park

== Sinclair ==
=== ZX Spectrum ===
Magnum Light Phaser games came with the gun:

- Bullseye – Magnum 1987 Macsen Software
- Missile Ground Zero – Magnum 1989 Mastertronic
- Operation Wolf – Magnum 1989 Ocean
- Robot Attack – Magnum 1990 Mastertronic
- Rookie – Magnum 1989 Mastertronic
- Solar Invasion – Magnum 1990 Mastertronic
- Target Plus

The following games worked with the Magnum Light Phaser, but were brought out by third parties. Some were remakes of the Cheetah Defender light-gun games by Code Masters Ltd.

- Billy the Kid (remake) – Virgin Mastertronic Ltd (UK)
- Bronx Street Cop (remake) – Virgin Mastertronic Ltd (UK)
- F-16 Fighting Falcon (remake) – Virgin Mastertronic Ltd (UK)
- Industria 14 – Mastertronic Ltd
- Jungle Warfare (remake) – Virgin Mastertronic Ltd (UK)
- Living Daylights – The Computer Game, The – Domark Ltd
- Lord Bromley's Estate – Amstrad
- Make My Day – Mastertronic Ltd
- Q's Armoury – Amstrad
- American Turbo King – (A remake of Super Car Trans Am) – Virgin Mastertronic Ltd (UK)

Cheetah Defender light-gun games all by Code Masters Ltd:

- Advanced Pinball Simulator
- Billy The Kid
- Bronx Street Cop
- F-16 Fighting Falcon
- Jungle Warfare
- Supercar Trans-am (Super Car Trans Am)

It should also be noted that both versions of the light guns that were meant for the 128K+ or up, worked with almost all the games available.

- Guillermo Tell

== Sony ==
=== PlayStation ===
The PlayStation has two major light guns: the GunCon/G-Con by Namco and the Konami Justifier (known as the Hyperblaster in Japan and Europe). Other licensed and non-licensed light guns are compatible with either Justifier games, GunCon games, or both.

- Area 51 (Justifier/Hyperblaster)
- Cellophanes (Japan only, GunCon. Often mistranslated as "Serofans")
- Crypt Killer (Justifier/Hyperblaster)
- Die Hard Trilogy (Justifier/Hyperblaster)

- Die Hard 2: Die Harder

- Die Hard Trilogy 2: Viva Las Vegas (Justifier/Hyperblaster or Guncon)

- Arcade Mode - Sharpshooting, and Movie Mode Sharpshooting segments only

- Elemental Gearbolt (Justifier/Hyperblaster or GunCon)
- Extreme Ghostbusters: The Ultimate Invasion (GunCon. Justifier/Hyperblaster is also compatible but not specified in the manual or on the packaging, however more than one Hyperblaster at once is unreliable, mixed guns can be used)
- Ghoul Panic (Europe only, GunCon) aka Oh! Bakyuuun (Japan only, GunCon)
- Gun Bare! The Game Paradise 2 (Japan only, GunCon)
- The Gun Shooting (Simple 1500 Series) (Japan only, GunCon)
- The Gun Shooting 2 (Simple 1500 Series) (Japan only, GunCon)
- Gunfighter: The Legend of Jesse James (GunCon)
- Guntu Western Front June, 1944 (Japan only, GunCon)
- Judge Dredd (Justifier/Hyperblaster or GunCon)
- Lethal Enforcers I & II (Justifier/Hyperblaster)

- Lethal Enforcers
- Lethal Enforcers II: Gun Fighters

- Maximum Force (Justifier/Hyperblaster or GunCon)
- Mighty Hits (Japan only, Justifier/Hyperblaster)
- Mighty Hits Special (Japan and Europe only, Justifier/Hyperblaster or Guncon)
- Moorhuhn 2 – Die Jagd Geht Weiter' (Europe only, Justifier/Hyperblaster or GunCon)
- Moorhen 3 – ...Chicken Chase' (Europe only, Justifier/Hyperblaster or GunCon)
- Moorhuhn X (Europe only, Justifier/Hyperblaster or GunCon)
- Point Blank (GunCon)
- Point Blank 2 (GunCon)
- Point Blank 3 (GunCon)
- Project Horned Owl (Justifier/Hyperblaster)
- Puffy's P.S. I Love You (Japan only, GunCon)
- Rescue Shot (GunCon)
- Resident Evil Survivor (Europe only, GunCon) aka Biohazard: Gun Survivor (Japan only, GunCon)
- Star Wars: Rebel Assault II (Justifier/Hyperblaster)

- Ground Combat Sequences - Chapters 2, 11, and 12

- Time Crisis (GunCon)
- Time Crisis: Project Titan (GunCon)

=== PlayStation 2 ===
The PlayStation 2 supports 3 light-gun input types, GunCon (GunCon 1), GunCon 2, and Justifier/Hyperblaster. Some games listed also support connecting an additional PS1/PS2 controller for convenient redundant button mapping, such as the Time Crisis games for cover shooting, or Resident Evil: Dead Aim for simultaneous control stick movement.

- Cocoto Funfair (Europe only, GunCon 1 only)
- Death Crimson OX+ (Japan, GunCon 2 only) aka Guncom 2 (Europe, GunCon 1, GunCon 2)
- Endgame (GunCon 1, GunCon 2)
- Gunfighter II: Revenge of Jesse James (Europe only, GunCon 1, GunCon 2)
- Gunvari Collection + Time Crisis (Japan only, GunCon 2 only)

- Point Blank
- Point Blank 2
- Point Blank 3
- Time Crisis

- Ninja Assault (North America/Japan, GunCon 2 only), (Europe, GunCon 1, GunCon 2)
- Police 24/7 (Europe, Justifier/Hyperblaster only*) aka The Keisatsukan: Shinjuku Ni Juu Yon Ji (Japan, Justifier/Hyperblaster only*)
- Time Crisis II (GunCon 1, GunCon 2)

- Arcade mode
- Extra Games mode

- Time Crisis 3 (North America/Japan, GunCon 2 only), (Europe, GunCon 1, GunCon 2)
- Time Crisis: Crisis Zone (North America/Japan, GunCon 2 only), (Europe, GunCon 1, GunCon 2)
- Vampire Night (GunCon 1, GunCon 2)
- Virtua Cop: Elite Edition (Europe/Australia, GunCon 2 only) aka Virtua Cop: Re-Birth (Japan, GunCon 2 only)

- Virtua Cop
- Virtua Cop 2
non-traditional light-gun games

- Dino Stalker (North America/Europe, GunCon 1**, GunCon 2) aka Gun Survivor 3: Dino Crisis (Japan, GunCon 1**, GunCon 2) (freedom of movement)
- Resident Evil: Dead Aim (North America/Europe, GunCon 1**, GunCon 2) aka Gun Survivor 4 Biohazard Heroes Never Die (Japan, GunCon 1**, GunCon 2) (freedom of movement)
- Resident Evil Survivor 2 Code: Veronica (Europe, GunCon 1, GunCon 2) aka Gun Survivor 2 Biohazard Code: Veronica (Japan, GunCon 2 only) (freedom of movement)
- Starsky & Hutch (player 2 only, GunCon 1, GunCon 2)

* also supports USB camera for body motion tracking

** requires an additional controller to be connected via the opposite controller port for d-pad inputs. This method also supports rumble force feedback via the second controller (Dino Stalker)

=== PlayStation 3 ===
The PlayStation 3 has several dedicated gun peripherals: the GunCon 3 by Namco, the Top Shot Elite by RedOctane, the Top Shot Fearmaster, as well as the PlayStation Move controller. The first revision of PlayStation Move controllers released (CECH-ZCM1U) also included a proprietary EXT port that could be connected to a Playstation Move Sharp Shooter attachment, which electronically and redundantly maps PSMove buttons to additional buttons found on the Sharp Shooter.

light-gun games

- Cabela's North American Adventures (2010) (Top Shot Elite) (includes light-gun galleries)
- Cabela's Adventure Camp (2011) (PSMove) (includes light-gun galleries)
- Cabela's Dangerous Hunts 2011 (PSMove, Top Shot Elite) (includes light-gun galleries)
- Cabela's Survival: Shadows of Katmai (2011) (PSMove, Top Shot Elite) (includes light-gun galleries)
- Cabela's Big Game Hunter 2012 (PSMove, Top Shot Elite) (includes light-gun galleries)
- Cabela's African Adventures (2013) (Top Shot Elite, Top Shot Fearmaster) (includes light-gun galleries)
- Cabela's Dangerous Hunts 2013 (Top Shot Elite, Top Shot Fearmaster) (includes light-gun galleries)
- Child of Eden (PSMove)
- Dead Space Extraction (PSMove)
- Fast Draw Showdown (PSMove)
- Gal*Gun (PSMove)
- Heavy Fire: Afghanistan (PSMove)
- Heavy Fire: Shattered Spear (PSMove)
- The House of the Dead III (PSMove)
- The House of the Dead 4 (PSMove) (also includes an unlockable port of The House of the Dead 4 Special)

- The House of the Dead 4
- The House of the Dead 4 Special

- The House of the Dead: Overkill – Extended Cut (PSMove)
- Hunter's Trophy (PSMove) (includes light-gun galleries)
- Hunter's Trophy 2 America (PSMove) (includes light-gun galleries)
- Hunter's Trophy 2 Australia (PSMove) (includes light-gun galleries)
- Hunter's Trophy 2 Europa (PSMove) (includes light-gun galleries)
- The Last Bounty Hunter (PSMove)
- Mad Dog McCree (PSMove)
- Mad Dog II: The Lost Gold (PSMove)
- Rambo: The Video Game (PSMove)
- Resident Evil: Chronicles HD Collection (PSMove)

- Resident Evil: The Darkside Chronicles
- Resident Evil: The Umbrella Chronicles

- The Shoot (PSMove)
- Time Crisis 4 (GunCon 3)

- Arcade mode
- Complete Mission Mode (freedom of movement)
- Extra Games mode

- Time Crisis: Razing Storm (GunCon 3, PSMove)

- Time Crisis 4 Arcade mode
- Time Crisis: Razing Storm

- Arcade Mode
- Story Mode (FPS)
- Sentry Mode

- DeadStorm Pirates Arcade mode

- Toy Story Mania! (PSMove)
- Wicked Monsters Blast! (PSMove)

Party Games with rail shooter/shooting gallery sections

- Carnival Island (PSMove)
- London 2012 (PSMove)
- Start the Party (PSMove)
- TV Superstars (PSMove)

FPS Games

- BioShock Infinite (PSMove)
- BioShock Infinite: Burial at Sea (PSMove)
- Cabela's North American Adventures (2010) (Top Shot Elite)
- Cabela's Dangerous Hunts 2011 (PSMove, Top Shot Elite)
- Cabela's Big Game Hunter 2012 (PSMove, Top Shot Elite)
- Cabela's Dangerous Hunts 2013 (Top Shot Elite, Top Shot Fearmaster)
- Cabela's Big Game Hunter: Pro Hunts (2014) (Top Shot Elite, Top Shot Fearmaster)
- Counter-Strike: Global Offensive (PSMove)
- Dust 514 (PSMove)
- GoldenEye 007: Reloaded (PSMove)
- Greg Hastings Paintball 2 (PSMove)
- Hunter's Trophy (PSMove)
- Hunter's Trophy 2 America (PSMove)
- Hunter's Trophy 2 Australia (PSMove)
- Hunter's Trophy 2 Europa (PSMove)
- Killzone 3 (PSMove)
- MAG (PSMove)
- Modern Combat: Domination (PSMove)
- Resistance 3 (PSMove)
- SOCOM 4 (PSMove)
- Snipers (PSMove)
- Time Crisis: Razing Storm (GunCon 3, PSMove) (includes FPS mode)

- Time Crisis: Razing Storm

- Story Mode (FPS)

non-traditional light-gun games

- Cabela's Survival: Shadows of Katmai (2011) (PSMove, Top Shot Elite)
- Cabela's Hunting Expeditions (2012) (Top Shot Elite, Top Shot Fearmaster)
- Cabela's African Adventures (2013) (Top Shot Elite, Top Shot Fearmaster)
- Deadly Premonition: The Director's Cut (PSMove)
- Epic Mickey 2: The Power of Two (PSMove)
- Harry Potter and the Deathly Hallows Part 2 (PSMove)
- Infamous 2 (PSMove)
- Infamous: Festival of Blood (PSMove)
- MIB: Alien Crisis (PSMove, Top Shot Elite)
- Oddworld: Stranger's Wrath HD (PSMove)
- PlayStation Move Heroes (PSMove)
- Resident Evil 5: Gold Edition (PSMove)

=== PlayStation 4 ===
The PS4 supports the Mars Lightcon by PDP, the PlayStation Move, and PlayStation VR Aim Controller controllers for use as light-gun peripherals.

- Blue Estate (DualShock 4 gyro)
- Big Buck Hunter Arcade (Mars)
- The House of the Dead: Remake (PSMove, PSVR Aim, computer-mouse-based lightguns, DualShock 4 gyro)
- The House of the Dead 2: Remake (PSVR Aim, DualShock 4 gyro)
- Qubit's Quest (Mars)
- Voyage of the Dead (Mars)

=== PlayStation 5 ===
- The House of the Dead: Remake (computer-mouse-based lightguns, DualSense gyro)
- The House of the Dead 2: Remake (DualSense gyro)

== Super Happy Fun Fun ==
=== Sure Shot HD ===
** Note: Due to the 'Sure Shot Shop' shutting down its online services, games that are not currently downloaded and installed to the game console may be unobtainable.

- A Thug in Time
- Archery
- Big Buck Hunter Pro (pre-installed with all consoles)
- Big Buck Hunter Pro Open Season
- Big Buck Safari (additionally pre-installed with some consoles)
- Big Buck Safari Outback
- Grand Shooter
- Mad Bullets
- Major Mayhem
- Shooty Bang!
- X-Racer
- Zombo Buster Rising: Remastered

== Tandy ==
=== Electronic TV Scoreboard 60-3061 ===
- Target
- Skeet

=== Tandy TRS-80 ===
- Iron Forest
- Medieval Madness

== Tiger Electronics ==
=== Tiger Laser Games ===
- Area 51
- Independence Day
- Mars Attacks!
- Virtua Cop
- Star Wars Rebel Forces

== Toymax ==
=== Arcadia Image Projecting Game System ===
The Arcadia was a cartridge-based projection light-gun system that allowed for two types of light-guns, the Arcadia Electronic Skeet Shoot Rifle, which was a single-shot only rifle with a pump reload and featured force feedback, a speaker for audio feedback, and a red-dot sight built into the front sight, as well as the Radar Pistol, which had a shake reload feature, a speaker for audio feedback, and a built-in laser pointer.

- Deer Hunter
- Duck Shoot
- Fighter Attack
- Meteor Attack
- Moorhuhn Jago

Unreleased games:

- African Safari
- Creepy Crawlers
- Dinosaur Hunt
- Hot Air Balloon

=== Arcadia II ===
Cartridge-based light-gun projection system.

- Duck Shoot II
- Meteor Attack
- Fighter Attack

=== Super Skeet Arcade ===
Dedicated projection-based light-gun console

- Duck Shoot

=== Super Skeet Arcade: Jurassic Park III ===
Dedicated projection-based light-gun console

- Jurassic Park III

=== Arcadia Super Skeet ===
Dedicated projection-based light-gun console

- Duck Shoot

=== Super Skeet Arcade II ===
Dedicated projection-based light-gun console

- Duck Shoot

== Universum ==
=== TV-Multi-Spiel 2006 ===
- Schiessen 1
- Schiessen 2

=== Color Multi-Spiel 4006 ===
- Schiessen 1
- Schiessen 2

=== Multi-Spiel 4106 ===
- Schiessen 1
- Schiessen 2

=== Color TV Multi-Spiel 4010 ===
- Schiessen 1
- Schiessen 2

=== Color TV Multi-Spiel 4014 ===
- Schiessen 1
- Schiessen 2

== Zanussi ==
=== Ping-O-Tronic ===
- Target Shooting

== Virtual reality headsets ==
For a VR game to qualify in this list, it must be rail-shooter in nature.

=== Nintendo Labo ===
The Nintendo Switch supports a cardboard gun cradle for its Joy-Con known as the Toy-Con Blaster featured in the Nintendo Labo Toy-Con 04 VR-kit, which can be used for motion-based VR rail shooters.

VR light-gun games

- Nintendo Labo Toy-Con 04

- Blaster (Toy-Con Blaster)
- Kablasta (Toy-Con Blaster)

=== PlayStation VR ===
The PS4 supports the PlayStation VR headset paired with the PlayStation Move controllers and/or the DualShock 4 with its lightbar coupled with the PlayStation Camera for use as VR light-gun peripherals. Sony also separately released the PlayStation VR Aim Controller controller for PSVR which included all of the original dualshock 4's buttons on a VR gun controller accessory.

VR light-gun games

- The Arcslinger (PSVR + PSMove)
- Blasters of the Universe (PSVR + PSMove)
- Blood & Truth (PSVR + PSMove, PSVR + PSVR Aim, PSVR + Dualshock 4) (includes VR light-gun galleries)
- Bravo Team (PSVR + PSMove, PSVR + PSVR Aim, PSVR + Dualshock 4)
- The Brookhaven Experiment (PSVR + PSMove, PSVR + PSVR Aim)
- Carnival Games VR (PSVR + PSMove) (includes VR light-gun galleries)
- Cold Iron (PSVR + PSMove)
- Crisis VRigade (PSVR + PSMove, PSVR + PSVR Aim, PSVR + Dualshock 4)
- Crisis VRigade 2 aka Crisis Brigade 2: Reloaded (PSVR + PSMove, PSVR + PSVR Aim, PSVR + Dualshock 4)
- The Copper Canyon Shootout (PSVR + PSMove)
- Darkness Rollercoaster: Ultimate Shooter Edition (PSVR + PSMove, PSVR + Dualshock 4)
- Desperate: Vladivostok (PSVR + PSMove)
- Dexed (PSVR + PSMove)
- Dick Wilde (PSVR + PSMove, PSVR + PSVR Aim)
- Dick Wilde 2 (PSVR + PSMove, PSVR + PSVR Aim)
- Drone Striker (PSVR + PSMove, PSVR + PSVR Aim)
- Ghosts In The Toybox: Chapter 1 (PSVR + PSMove, PSVR + Dualshock 4)
- Gun Club VR (PSVR + PSMove)
- Guns'n'Stories: Bulletproof VR (PSVR + PSMove)
- Hopalong: The Badlands (PSVR + PSMove)
- Lethal VR (PSVR + PSMove)
- Mortal Blitz VR (PSVR + PSMove, PSVR + Dualshock 4)
- Operation Warcade (PSVR + PSMove, PSVR + PSVR Aim, PSVR + Dualshock 4)
- The Perfect Sniper (PSVR + PSMove, PSVR + PSVR Aim, PSVR + Dualshock 4)
- Pixel Gear (PSVR + PSMove)
- Shooty Fruity (PSVR + PSMove)
- Sneaky Bears (PSVR + PSMove)
- Space Pirate Trainer (PSVR + PSMove)
- Starship Disco (PSVR + PSMove, PSVR + Dualshock 4)
- Summer Funland (PSVR + PSMove) (includes VR light-gun galleries)
- Time Carnage (PSVR + PSMove)
- Transformers: Beyond Reality (PSVR + PSMove)
- Until Dawn: Rush of Blood (PSVR + PSMove, PSVR + Dualshock 4)
- Vigilante Ranger (PSVR + PSMove)
- VR Invaders (PSVR + PSMove)
- The Walker (PSVR + PSMove)
- Wraith (PSVR + PSMove. PSVR + PSVR Aim, PSVR + Dualshock 4)
- Xeta (PSVR + PSMove)

VR rhythm rail-shooters

- Audica (PSVR + PSMove)
- BeatBlaster (PSVR + PSMove, PSVR + PSVR Aim, PSVR + Dualshock 4)
- Pistol Whip (PSVR + PSMove)

VR non-traditional rail-shooters

- The American Dream (PSVR + PSMove)
- The Playroom VR

- Wanted! (PSVR + Dualshock 4) (requires at least 2 players)

=== PlayStation VR2 ===
The PS5 has support for light-gun style VR rail shooters through PSVR2.

VR light-gun games

- Crisis Brigade 2 Reloaded
- The Dark Pictures: Switchback VR
- Darkness Rollercoaster - PSVR2 REMASTERED EDITION
- Dead Second
- Desperate: Vladivostok
- Gazzlers
- Gun Club VR Reloaded
- K-ONE
- Operation Serpens
- Operation Wolf Returns: First Mission VR
- RUNNER
- Sugar Mess - Let's Play Jolly Battle
- Train Chase
- Transformers Beyond Reality
- Vendetta Forever!
- Zombieland: Headshot Fever Reloaded

VR rhythm rail-shooters

- Pistol Whip
