= Steel Gunner =

1990 first-person shooter arcade game

- Japanese promotional sales flyer
- Developer: Namco
- Publisher: Namco
- Producer: Kazunori Sawano
- Series: Steel Gunner
- Platform: Arcade
- Release: JP: October 3, 1990; WW: March 1991
- Genre: First-person shooter
- Modes: Single-player, multiplayer
- Arcade system: Namco System 2 Plus

Steel Gunner (Note: Japanese: スティールガンナー, Hepburn: Sutīru Gannā) is a 1990 first-person shooter arcade game developed and published by Namco. Players take control of Garcia and Cliff, a duo of police officers that are part of the Neo Arc police force, as they must use their powerful Gargoyle mecha suits to destroy the STURM terrorist organization, who have taken captive scientists Dr. Ryan and Dr. Ellis to create a world-ending superweapon. Gameplay revolves around using a crosshair to shoot down enemies and avoid harming civilians. It runs on the Namco System 2 Plus arcade hardware.

Steel Gunner is Namco's first light gun video game. The game was produced by Kazunori Sawano, who was previously a designer on games such as Galaxian and King & Balloon. Namco engineer Shigeki Toyama produced the arcade cabinet and light guns, and worked as a planner closely with the development team. The prototype models of the guns were originally depicted as being more futuristic. Namco executives instead decided to use them for Golly! Ghost!, forcing Toyama to design a new version of the guns in two days though having complete fiberglass prototypes of the original designs. Steel Gunner was well-received by critics for its gameplay, visuals and overall presentation, often being compared to Operation Wolf. A direct sequel, Steel Gunner 2, was released in 1992.

== Gameplay ==
The player uses a crosshair to fire at enemies

Steel Gunner is a light gun shooter video game. The plot stars the police officers Garcia and Cliff, who are members of the Neo Arc police force that use mecha suits named "Gargoyles" equipped with powerful weapons. Garcia and Cliff are assigned by the Neo Arc to destroy the terrorist organization STURM, who have captured the scientist Dr. Ryan and his assistant Dr. Ellis to create a world-ending superweapon. Gameplay revolves around using a light gun to control a crosshair around the screen while shooting enemies. Players have infinite ammunition and do not need to reload their weapons. Players also have access to a limited number of screen-clearing missiles.

The game consists of four levels, with seamless horizontal and vertical-scrolling transitions. Stages feature a large variety of objects that can be destroyed purely for amusement, such as boxes, windows, barrels and fuel tanks. The players have a health meter that deplete when they are inflicted with enemy fire. Health can be gained by protecting innocent civilians found throughout levels from enemies, while shooting civilians will deplete the player's health. Stages end with a boss fight, with the fourth stage having players face off against the leader of STURM, Gaste Bernard. The loss of all health results in a game over. At the end of each level, players are graded based on shooting accuracy, and health and missile stockage are automatically refilled. If players' shooting accuracy was low, a cutscene plays of the Neo Arc police chief berating Garcia and Cliff about causing almost as much damage as STURM.

== Development and release ==
Steel Gunner was released by Namco for arcades, initially with a limited release on October 3, 1990, (Note: The game's title screen lists a copyright date of 1990.) followed by a wide release in March 1991. It was the company's first light gun video game. It was produced by Kazunori Sawano, who had previously been a designer on games such as Galaxian (1979) and King & Balloon (1980). The game's light guns and arcade cabinet were designed by Namco engineer Shigeki Toyama, who is often described as the company's "Doc Brown character" for his strange yet innovative ideas. It is the final game that Toyama produced the cabinet for, and the first on which he worked directly with the game designers as a planner. The light guns originally had a much more futuristic, science fiction design to them. When Namco executives instead decided to use them for Golly! Ghost!, Toyama was forced to create new designs for the guns in two days, though having already finished fiberglass prototypes for the originals.

== Reception ==
Reception

Review scores
Publication	Score
Zzap!64	Positive
Gamest	50/70
Your Commodore	Positive

Award
Publication	Award
Gamest	Grand Prize 9th Best Shooting Prize 10th Best Directing 6th Annual Hit Game 31st

Steel Gunner was successful in arcades. In Japan, it was the eighth highest-grossing dedicated arcade game of 1991. In North America, it was the top-grossing new video game on the RePlay arcade charts in June 1991, and then the fourth top-grossing upright cabinet in July 1991. It remained among the top ten arcade games on the RePlay charts for a year through June 1992, when Steel Gunner was the eighth most popular upright arcade cabinet and tenth most-successful software conversion kit.

Steel Gunner was well-received by publications, being noted for its action film-like presentation and violence. In 1991, Japanese publication Gamest awarded the game several runner-up awards based on reader votes, including "Grand Prize 9th", "Best Shooting Prize 10th", "Best Directing 6th", and "Annual Hit Game 31st".

Your Commodore labeled it as "quite a good blast", and retrospectively Hardcore Gaming 101 applauded its overall presentation and quality, saying that being Namco's first light gun shooter was impressive alone. The gameplay was heavily praised, with several complimenting its responsive controls and well-designed levels. In 1998, Gamest reviewed the game as part of its Gamest Mook Vol. 112, where the unique and entertaining gameplay was greatly applauded. Gamest stated its amount of action was comparable to films such as The Terminator, and said it helped make it one of the best light gun shooters of the era. Zzap!64 found its quality and gameplay superior to Sega's Laser Ghost, claiming it to be "more attractive" than Sega's offering for its mature-oriented approach. Some reviewers have also drawn comparisons between Steel Gunner and Taito's Operation Wolf (1987).

The visuals and presentation of Steel Gunner were praised. Many publications enjoyed its colorful graphics, with detailed and interactive environments. Hardcore Gaming 101 applauded its sprite-scaling effects and amount of shootable background objects, which add depth and realism to the levels. Gamest said its level designs were creative and unique, and of better quality than those found in games like Space Gun. Your Commodore enjoyed the comical cutscenes depicting the player's police chief berating them. Sega-16 expressed disappointment towards the lack of a home release, specifically for the Sega CD and 32X, saying that its intense action and great gameplay would "undoubtedly have sold among Genesis owners".

== Sequel ==
A direct arcade sequel, Steel Gunner 2, was released a year later in Japan in March 1992 and in North America the following month. The plot follows Garcia and Cliff piloting their Gargoyle mecha suits to fight off the Vanguard organization, a terrorist group with an army of genetically-engineered supersoldiers to destroy all of Earth and enslave mankind. Gameplay is largely similar to the original, with new stages and the story being told through dialogue boxes during levels. It was sold as a conversion kit for both the original and Taito's Operation Thunderbolt, or as a dedicated machine. Much of the design staff from the original Steel Gunner worked on the sequel.
