= Big bucks =

Big bucks may refer to:

- A large amount of money
- Big Bucks Trivia, a game
- Big Buck Hunter, another game
- Big Buck's, National Hunt racehorse
