= Judge Dredd (1997 video game) =

1997 video game

- European cover art by Simon Bisley
- Developer: Gremlin Interactive
- Publishers: Arcade; Acclaim Entertainment; PlayStation: EU: Gremlin Interactive; NA: Activision
- Producer: Steven Zalud
- Programmer: Jim Tebbut
- Artist: Simon Bisley
- Composers: Stuart Ross; Pat Phelan
- Platforms: Arcade, PlayStation
- Release: Arcade; October 1997; PlayStation; EU: November 1997; NA: March 1998
- Genre: Light gun shooter
- Modes: Single-player, multiplayer (Note: Up to 2 players cooperative gameplay.)
- Arcade system: Sony ZN-1

Judge Dredd is a 1997 light gun shooter video game developed and published by Gremlin Interactive. Though it came out just a couple years after the Judge Dredd film, the game is actually based on the comic book of the same name. It was published by Acclaim Entertainment for the arcades, and by Gremlin Interactive in Europe and Activision in North America for the PlayStation. The emulated version of the PlayStation game was re-released by Urbanscan for the PlayStation Network on 24 January 2008. The game met with overwhelmingly negative reviews, with criticism directly at its unintelligent and unfairly difficult design and its unreliable targeting cursor.

== Gameplay ==
Judge Dredd is a light gun game set in the 22nd century, where Judge Dredd fights an ex-judge prison escapee, who kidnapped the mayor, and his army of merciless androids. The gameplay is similar to Area 51 and Maximum Force with some elements from Time Crisis, in that the game's full motion video is integrated with the action.

== Reception ==
Reception

Review scores
Publication	Score
AllGame	2/5
Electronic Gaming Monthly	2.875/10 (Note: Three critics of Electronic Gaming Monthly gave the PlayStation version each a score of 3/10, and one gave it 2.5/10.)
Game Informer	8.25/10
GameFan	49% (Note: In GameFan's viewpoint of the PlayStation version, three critics gave it each a score of 50, 55, and 42.)
GameRevolution	D
GameSpot	2.5/10
IGN	2/10
Next Generation	1/5
Official U.S. PlayStation Magazine	1.5/5
PlayStation: The Official Magazine	1.5/5

The PlayStation version was almost overwhelmingly panned by critics. The complaints were numerous and varied from review to review, but some of the more common ones were that the cluttered screen and confusing backgrounds make it unfairly difficult to spot enemies, the targeting cursor lags behind where the gun is actually aimed, and enemies take multiple hits too kill, making it almost impossible to get through some sections without getting hit. IGN's Douglass C. Perry also found the level designs poorly paced, with an imbalance between swarms of enemies overwhelming the player and dull stretches of waiting for something to shoot. PSM denounced the lack of sound marking when a player is hit or even loses a life, pointing out, "This means that no matter how well you do, the game will leave you confused and frustrated when it ends." A number of critics described Judge Dredd as a third-rate Area 51 clone.

Most critics derided the game's story, though Perry instead praised it, saying even the awfulness of the rest of the game did not prevent him from enjoying the full motion video (FMV). Next Generation also praised it, saying it features "some of the clearest and most vibrant video ever to grace a PlayStation game", though they expressed disappointment that the villain of the story, Judge Roy Bean, does not appear as a boss, with the climactic battle instead being played out in a cutscene. Jeff Gerstmann, reviewing the game for GameSpot, fell in line with the majority opinion on the FMV sequences, remarking, "It looks like the Judge's outfits were made by spraying some gold paint onto cardboard, and the acting is laughably pathetic." Gerstmann and Electronic Gaming Monthly (EGM) reviewer John Ricciardi both found the licensing questionable, questioning whether a significant Judge Dredd fan base even exists, while Perry lamented that the Judge Dredd movie and video games were giving a bad image to the comic book series, which he felt was "still great".

One positive review came from Game Informer, which said, "The story of Judge Dredd is revealed through FMV, but this Dredd is no Sly Stallone. In fact, this Dredd is even more of a dork. Other than that, Activision's new light gun shooter is solid." A review by Playstation Power noted positively the decision by Gremlin to make the game compatible not only with the G-Con 45 but also the Konami Justifier and its clones such as Logic 3’s Predator. Awarding the game 6 out of 10, the review described it as fun to play but was “a long way from being as captivation as its rival” Time Crisis.

William Schiffmann for the Sun Journal of Lewiston, Maine, said that "if you like shooting gallery games, this is a fine example of the genre." However, he added that the lack of randomization of level designs makes light gun shooters in general not worth buying. PSM summed up, "Levels are a chore at best, totally devoid of anything that resembles skill. In fact, we've found that the best way to beat a level is to just make sure you find all the hidden health." All four members of EGM's "review crew" said even light gun enthusiasts would not enjoy the game, and in its "best feature" slot they wrote "Hmmm... Can't think of one..." Gerstmann similarly advised, "No matter how strong your craving for a gun game may be, just wait this one out."
