= Laser Ghost =

1990 video game

- Master System box art
- Developer: Sega
- Publisher: Sega
- Platforms: Arcade, Master System
- Release: December 1990: Arcade; December 19, 1991: Master System
- Genre: Light gun shooter
- Modes: Single-player, Multiplayer
- Arcade system: Sega System 18

Laser Ghost (レーザーゴースト) is a horror-themed light gun shooter arcade video game released by Sega in 1990. The game is patterned after the films Ghostbusters and Poltergeist III, casting the player as a ghost hunter. There are three mounted guns set up on the cabinet, representing the three members of a ghost hunting team. The game puts the players in the role of Bill, Max and Carol, who must rescue a little girl kidnapped by a blue gargoyle, as well as protect the city from the ghost menace. A Master System game with the same title was released in 1991 exclusively for Europe, but was not based on the arcade original.

== Gameplay ==
Arcade screenshot

The game was distributed in a horizontally oriented cabinet with a standard resolution color screen that is reflected by a mirror. The game can be played by up to three players simultaneously. It is controlled by a positional gun with two buttons, one for regular fire and another for limited-use special weapons. In addition to the gun, the cabinet also features an on-screen aiming reticule in which a mirror projects a red light beam away from the gun each time the player makes a shot, giving the illusion that an actual laser ray comes out from the gun to the target. The game puts the three hunters in five stages where they must destroy waves of ghosts, each one ending with a boss battle. Each player's damage zone is represented by a third of the screen, where their stats are also located. A player receives damage if their third of the screen is hit by an enemy. Ghost attacks deplete the player's life bar, which can be replenished by shooting a medical kit that some enemies leave after they are destroyed.

Laser Ghost for the Master System is completely different from the arcade original. In the game, players must protect a young girl named Catherine who is being held captive in the haunted White Manor. Using either the joypad or the Light Phaser gun, players eliminate the various hazards Catherine encounters as she attempts to escape with her soul.

== Development ==
The arcade version of Laser Ghost was exhibited at the UK Amusement Trades Exhibition International in 1991.

== Reception ==
In Japan, Game Machine listed Laser Ghost as being the seventh most-successful upright arcade unit of the month in their January 1, 1991 issue.

The arcade game received positive reviews upon release. According to Zzap!64, the game sounded good and played well, but it did not do enough to distinguish itself from similar games such as Operation Thunderbolt, Space Gun and Mechanized Attack. British gaming magazine The One reviewed the arcade version of Laser Ghost in 1991, comparing its gameplay to Beast Busters and its plot to The Real Ghostbusters. The One calls Laser Ghost's gameplay "nothing out of the ordinary to play", but expresses that "the ghostly goings-on will get most players [excited]".

Mean Machines said that the Master System game was fun, but was critical of the low graphical quality. Console XS reviewed the Master System version in 1992, giving it an 84% score.

Retrospectively, Allgame opined that the arcade game was fun, but probably not worth the quarters players had to spend to play it.

== See also ==
- Beast Busters
