= Marksman Shooting & Trap Shooting =

1986 video game

Marksman Shooting & Trap Shooting Marksman Shooting / Trap Shooting / Safari Hunt
- Developer: Sega
- Publisher: Sega
- Platforms: Master System, Arcade
- Release: NA: December 1986; EU: August 1987
- Genre: Shooter
- Mode: Single-player

Marksman Shooting & Trap Shooting is a light gun shooter compilation game released for Master System in North America in 1986. A third game, Safari Hunt, was included in the European version, retitled Marksman Shooting / Trap Shooting / Safari Hunt. Safari Hunt was also bundled with Hang-On as part of another multicart and also as a built-in game in Version 2.4 of the Master System BIOS. All three games were released in Japan individually for Shooting Zone, a Master System-compatible arcade board dedicated to light gun games.

In each game, players must use the Light Phaser to shoot targets and beat the qualification score before moving on to the next round. Failure to qualify results in an instant game over.

== Gameplay ==
Safari Hunt was included as the third game in the European version.

Players select from one of three separate games. In each of the three games, players must use the Light Phaser to shoot targets and score a set number of points. The targets vary in each game. Marksman Shooting has players shoot red dots on targets at a shooting range. The second game, Trap Shooting simulates the sport of the same name as players shoot at flying targets.

Safari Hunt is similar to Duck Hunt for the NES, requiring the player to shoot at various animals. The player must score a certain number of points by shooting the animals with a limited number of bullets to move to the next level. There are three different levels and different animals in each level:

- Lake - Duck, Fish and Rabbit
- Forest - Bird, Armadillo and Bear
- Jungle - Spider, Monkey, Bat and Panther

At no point is the crocodile from the title screen available for hunting.

The three levels repeat until level 69 at which the final required score is one million points. After clearing the level, a screen appears that says that the player has made it to the end of the game followed by a "Game Over" screen.
