= Big Buck Hunter =

2000 video game

- Developer: Play Mechanix
- Publishers: Incredible Technologies (Arcade, initial series); Raw Thrills (Arcade, Pro/Safari series); Crave Entertainment (Wii); GameMill Entertainment (Microsoft Windows, PlayStation 4, Xbox One, Nintendo Switch)
- Platforms: Arcade, iOS, Wii, Microsoft Windows, PlayStation 4, Xbox One, Nintendo Switch
- Release: Big Buck Hunter; December 2000; Big Buck Hunter: Shooter's Challenge; February 2002; Big Buck Hunter II: Sportsman's Paradise; August 2002; Big Buck Hunter: Call of the Wild; March 2005; Big Buck Hunter Pro; January 23, 2006 (Arcade); October 28, 2009 (iOS); September 15, 2010 (Wii); February 20, 2013 (Microsoft Windows); Big Buck Safari; March 11, 2008 (Arcade); October 5, 2011 (iOS); Big Buck Hunter Pro Open Season; November 22, 2009; Big Buck World; November 8, 2010; Big Buck HD; June 12, 2012 (Arcade); October 25, 2016 (Microsoft Windows, PlayStation 4, Xbox One); October 16, 2018 (Nintendo Switch); Big Buck HD Wild; April 1, 2015; Big Buck Hunter Reloaded; 2020

Big Buck Hunter is a game hunting video game developed by Play Mechanix. Primarily developed for arcades, the goal of the game is to shoot moving bucks or male animals without shooting a doe or female animal.

The initial series of games released from 2000 to 2005 by Incredible Technologies, operated on a single gun platform and allowed four players to compete in a round-robin style through various treks and bonus stages. Games beginning with Big Buck Hunter Pro, released in 2006 by Raw Thrills, introduced a two-gun platform, allowing head-to-head competition in addition to a variety of new animals and critters to hunt.

== Gameplay ==
Inspired by Duck Hunt, the game's goal is to shoot the male animals as they run across the screen. The round ends after a period of time when all the male animals are killed or if some get away. If a player shoots a female animal, they are out. Each scene will begin with a couple of animals walking without any suspicions. After a first shot is done, the animals will begin running and the hunt starts. Big Buck Hunter is separated in five screens, also known as "treks". A hunting sessions concludes in a bonus round. The players can either participate solo or one on one by using two plastic rifles. How much points will be earned depends on certain factors like distance, weight and accuracy. There are different states to choose from with a variety of animals, like antelope or moose. The hunting can be done in different conditions varying from fog to snow, with overall 16 bonus rounds. All of the Big Buck HD machines are networked so they can track the players' rankings through online leaderboards. Big Buck HD was the first edition to integrate Facebook and Twitter, which allows players to share and compare scores and awards via social networks.

== Tournaments ==
Big Buck Hunter game cabinets that are connected to the CoinUp Network can support local and national tournaments. If a game cabinet is participating in a current tournament, the 'Tournaments' button will appear on the first Game Selection Screen. After selecting the Tournament button, the player can scroll through all tournaments currently playing on that game cabinet. For Big Buck Hunter Pro & Safari, the National Tournaments ran monthly (usually from the 7th to the 27th of each month for Pro and the 1st to the 21st of each month for Safari until the end of 2012). National Tournaments did return to Big Buck HD WILD for a short time in 2017 and 2018, but on a weekly basis with a particular theme for each month. Players can find out about current tournament, prizes, participating locations and follow their tournament ranking at the Big Buck Hunter Website. Operators can also choose to set up their own custom tournaments for Big Buck HD, Wild, & Reloaded games that they own via the CoinUp website. They can choose the prizes, cost, sites, and bonuses they desire and assign them to desired units.

Beginning in 2008, a World Championship Tournament was introduced. It brings in 64 people from all over the world in an elimination tournament, where the highest rated players in each region get to earn an invite for the event. Regional Qualifying tournaments occur in August and September, with winners advancing to the World Championship Tournament, which occurs every fall in cities like Chicago, New York City, Minneapolis, Austin, & Las Vegas. On November 10, 2012, the Big Buck Hunter World Tournament was held in the Altman Building in New York City.

Starting in 2013, players would no longer be divided by region, and instead they would have to play 5 national tournaments. Each tournament was themed to a specific animal for the 2013 and 2014 Qualifiers. Their 10 best scores in each tournament would determine where they ended up on the leaderboard. The Ladies' Tourney, introduced in 2011, had its own qualifier tournament as well. Starting in 2015, the qualifier would start as early as May, with a new tournament unlocking at the start of every month, and the tournaments were changed so that they would use random animals since this was the first year where there were more than 5 animals in Big Buck HD. In 2016 and 2017, the tournaments were animal themed once again, with each tournament having 1 or 2 animals in them. Australia & Canada also had their own national tournaments to determine who would move on.

In May 2018, Pro mode was introduced. This mode was designed to allow easier World Championship qualification. The player's top 5 scores on each Trek of each animal determines where they rank on the Skill leaderboard for the Qualifier Season (on Reloaded machines it is their top 3 scores obtained with the gun and their top 2 scores obtained with the bow). If they are not eligible for the Skill leaderboard but have a sufficient cumulative score, they would be on the Wildcard leaderboard. If a player is female, their scores would count for both the World Championship and Ladies' Tourney. Also, any region can participate in Pro mode, and they are no longer locked into their own leaderboards. With Pro mode becoming a core part of the game, the qualifier would start in November, and end in September, with the World Championship happening in October.

== Development ==
Big Buck Hunter's concept came from Play Mechanix founder George Petro. After the release of Midway's Invasion: The Abductors in 1999, Petro thought that hunting games were popular in homes but there was also a lack of those in arcades. He pitched the idea to the design team, and shortly after started developing the prototype, with Incredible Technologies handling the manufacture of the arcade machine. Incredible Technologies partnered with Play Mechanix to release the rest of the games until Call of the Wild in 2005. In 2006, the Big Buck Hunter series had sold around 7,500 units.

Needing financial support to make the next game in the series, Big Buck Hunter Pro, the developers contacted Raw Thrills in January 2006. As a part of the agreement, Play Mechanix continued to design the games, while Raw Thrills took over the production and distribution. In March 2008, Raw Thrills released Big Buck Safari, which introduced trophy hunting in Africa. They released Open Season in November 2009, which added more animals to Pro. In November 2010, Big Buck World was released to celebrate the 10th anniversary of Big Buck Hunter. It combines Open Season and Safari into one arcade cabinet.

In 2012, they released Big Buck HD, which combined elements from Pro and Safari. The game has a resolution of 1080p and online connectivity which enabled online matchmaking and tournaments. A Duck Dynasty-themed side game was added in 2013. In 2015, the update Big Buck HD Wild was released. New animals were added to the game through 2018, as well as a zombie-themed shooter side game.

The developers partnered with Anheuser-Busch InBev, offering a special permit that unlocks a special "Great White Buck" level. Proceeds were donated to the National Forest Foundation.

In 2020, Big Buck Hunter Reloaded was released. In addition to new animals and user interface changes, two new side games were introduced, including a sequel to the zombie game as well as a partial remake of Raw Thrills' previous arcade rail shooter Terminator: Salvation, which was released in 2010.

== List of arcade games ==
- Big Buck Hunter (2000)
- Big Buck Hunter: Shooter's Challenge (2002)
- Big Buck Hunter II: Sportsman's Paradise (2002)
- Big Buck Hunter: Call of the Wild (2005)
- Big Buck Hunter Pro (January 23, 2006)
- Big Buck Safari (March 11, 2008)
- Big Buck Hunter Pro Open Season (November 22, 2009)
- Big Buck World (November 8, 2010)
- Big Buck HD (June 12, 2012)
- Big Buck HD Wild (April 1, 2015)
- Big Buck Hunter Reloaded (2020)

== Home releases ==
In 2009, an iOS version of Big Buck Hunter Pro was released. Following that, an iOS version of Big Buck Safari was released in 2011.

In 2013, Microsoft Studios released a port of Big Buck Hunter Pro titled Big Buck Hunter Pro Adventure, specifically released under the name Big Buck Hunter for Microsoft Windows via the Microsoft Store, designed for both tablet and home computers running Windows 8.

GameMill Entertainment released a port of Big Buck HD Wild as Big Buck Hunter Arcade for Microsoft Windows, PlayStation 4, and Xbox One in 2016, and for Nintendo Switch in 2018.

In 2019, Play Mechanix also announced a partnership with Tastemakers LLC to release an Arcade1Up version of Big Buck Hunter Pro in fall 2020.

In 2023, Arcade1Up released Big Buck Hunter Pro Deluxe, which included the games Hunter Pro, Pro Open Season, Safari, and Safari Outback.
