= Attack of the Movies 3D =

2010 video game

- Cover art for the Wii version
- Developer: Panic Button
- Publisher: Majesco
- Platforms: Wii, Xbox 360
- Release: NA: May 18, 2010
- Genre: Rail shooter
- Modes: Single-player, multiplayer

Attack of the Movies 3D is a rail shooter video game developed by Panic Button and published by Majesco for the Wii and Xbox 360. It is one of the first games developed by Panic Button. The game transports players into six movie-themed worlds where they battle large alien space cruisers, shoot underwater monsters and more, only to discover the reason these movies come to life.

== Reception ==
Reception

Aggregate score
Aggregator	Score	
Aggregator	Wii	Xbox 360
Metacritic	39/100	38/100

Review scores
Publication	Score	
Publication	Wii	Xbox 360
Game Informer	4/10	4/10
IGN	4.5/10	4/10
NGamer	15%	N/A
Nintendo Power	4/10	N/A
Official Xbox Magazine (US)	N/A	3/10

The game received "generally unfavorable reviews" on both platforms according to the review aggregation website Metacritic. Justin Cheng of Nintendo Power criticized the short length of the levels throughout the six environments, the enemy creatures and a lack of variety amongst similar weapons, calling it "a lackluster 3-D light-gun shooter." Game Informer senior editor Jeff Cork felt the different levels played identically with undistinguished targets, showed a lack of "branching paths or variations in the gameplay", and called out the 3D elements for being "a mixed blessing – the game is so offensively ugly that I didn't want it getting any closer to me than necessary." He concluded that: "The dubious benefit of the game's 3D effects is offset by its one-dimensional gameplay. Rail shooters don't get much more tedious, lifeless, or ugly than Attack of the Movies 3-D."
