= Virtua Cop 3 =

2003 video game

- Developer: Sega AM2
- Publisher: Sega
- Producer: Masanori Oe
- Designer: Yoshihiro Okabayashi
- Programmer: Masayuki Sumi
- Artist: Takehiko Mikami
- Series: Virtua Cop
- Platform: Arcade
- Release: March 2003
- Genres: Light gun shooter, rail shooter
- Modes: Single-player, multiplayer
- Arcade system: Sega Chihiro

Virtua Cop 3 is a light gun shooter developed and published by Sega. The third and final game from Sega's Virtua Cop franchise, it was released exclusively for arcades in 2003. The game was released in standard and deluxe cabinet formats and runs on Sega Chihiro arcade hardware. A port for the Xbox was planned, but later cancelled.

== Gameplay ==
Virtua Cop 3 retains the same gameplay as its predecessor with players shooting onscreen enemies using a gun controller. The game introduces a slow-motion "bullet time" mechanic, "ES mode", which allows players to slow down time by stepping on a foot pedal. During ES mode, time slows down as the player's ES meter is depleted, allowing the player to shoot projectiles. The meter can be replenished by shooting more enemies.

Virtua Cop 3 also allows players to toggle between different weapons by pressing a button on the gun instead of having to use just one weapon, as in previous entries in the series. The alternative weapons include the Smith & Wesson Model 629, Benelli M4 Super 90, H&K MP7 and the H&K G36C. Like the previous installments, players progress through the game choosing between three missions which vary in difficulty. The newly designed gun used in the game is named the Guardian II, and was designed by Tokyo Marui, famous for their model guns.

== Story ==
Virtua Cop 3 has three chapters (referred to as Missions) which can be played in any desired order. The game follows Michael "Rage" Hardy, James "Smarty" Cools and Janet Marshall, as they investigate three crimes performed by Virtua City's new crime syndicate, the ECM.

=== Simple Mission: Angel Allow ===
The ECM has taken over a large pharmacy building. Rage and Smarty are dispatched by the VCPD to apprehend the invaders and secure the building. During the pharmacy mission, Rage and Smarty encounter a mysterious man known as "Gale", a ninja with unknown intentions. Proceeding deeper inside the pharmacy research lab, Rage and Smarty encounter a man named "Glitter", who masterminded the invasion. While the VCPD manages to secure the pharmacy building, Janet receives disturbing information that the pharmacy's genetic cloning sample is missing.

=== Normal Mission: Stray Cat ===
The ECM is robbing a large bank in downtown Virtua City. The VCPD Riot Squad is no match for the ECM's munitions, prompting Rage and Smarty to assist the disadvantaged riot squad. Once Rage and Smarty spot Brand, the mastermind of the robbery, in the building, a chase ensues, but after Rage and Smarty endure the interference as they make their way out of the building, Gale interrupts them once again. Rage and Smarty survive Gale and pursue the bank robbers, ultimately being pushed towards the subway where Brand is hiding. The ultimate battle between the Virtua Cops and Brand ensues. At the end of the bank mission, Janet receives disturbing information that the reason for the ECM's bank robbery was to retrieve a secured package of dinosaur genes.

=== Hard Mission: Owl Strike ===
A military base has been seized by the ECM. Rage, Smarty, and Janet make a sneak attack through the sewers before ultimately catching up with the military base. Enduring the heavily guarded area, the three make it inside the hangars where a crab-like mech provokes the three to a life-or-death duel. The pilot, turning out to be Joe Fang (the final boss of the first two Virtua Cop games), shows himself. In spite of the shock Rage had when he saw Fang, the vehicle is destroyed and the military base is secured.

=== Extra Mission: Heaven's Door ===
Depending on the mission completion order and the player's performance, the player may be asked to play this final mission where the behind-the-scenes plot is revealed.

Rage, Smarty, and Janet are sent to the ECM's main underground facility. Janet hacks into the entrance, only to encounter Gale once again, who challenges the three in a duel inside the hangar. The three proceed get onto an elevator platform, where they fight Joe Fang clones. The elevator leads them to the real Joe Fang, who starts to mutate into his monstrous, demon-like form known as "Dino Fang" by injecting the dinosaur genes into his own human DNA, and the Virtua Cops face him in the final battle once again. Ultimately, they defeat Dino Fang and ECM's main facility self-destructs as the Virtua Cops narrowly escape from the explosion. Thus, the case is closed and ECM's plot is recorded on VCPD's file.

==== Unlocking Conditions ====
To be able to play this mission, the player must satisfy the following conditions:

1. The missions must be completed in the following order: Simple Mission, Normal Mission, and Hard Mission
2. In the Normal Mission, the player must not let Brand escape
3. In the Hard Mission, the player must destroy all the missiles after the crab mech boss is defeated

== Development ==
In early 1997 Electronic Gaming Monthly reported that "[Virtua] Cop 3 is in development but it won't make its debut until the September JAMMA show". It was later reported that Virtua Cop 3 would be released in 1998 and use the Sega Model 3 arcade hardware.

== Xbox ==
A version of Virtua Cop 3 was planned for the original Xbox upon which the Chihiro arcade hardware was based. However, the game's release was cancelled reportedly due to the costs of having to release a light gun for the system especially for the game.
