= Wicked Monsters Blast! =

2011 video game

Wicked Monsters BLAST!
- Developer: Corecell Technology
- Publishers: Wii: NA: Valcon Games; EU: Corecell Technology; PlayStation 3, Wii U Corecell Technology
- Platforms: PlayStation 3, Wii, Wii U
- Release: Wii: NA: July 7, 2011; EU: March 9, 2012; PlayStation 3: EU: September 5, 2012; NA: November 13, 2012; Wii U: EU: October 15, 2015; NA: January 14, 2016
- Genre: Shooter
- Modes: Single-player, multiplayer

Wicked Monsters BLAST! is a 2011 gallery shooting video game for the Nintendo Wii and PlayStation 3. A port for the Wii U subtitled HD Plus was released in 2015. The game was developed by Thai-based studio Corecell Technology.

== Controls ==
The Wii version uses the Wii Remote, while the PS3 version uses either the PlayStation Move controller or a DualShock 3 controller.

== Gameplay ==
The game is similar to Point Blank, featuring multiple challenges.
