= National Forest Foundation =

U.S. non-profit organization

- Founded: October 1, 1992
- Type: 501(c)(3)
- Location: Building 27, Suite 3, Fort Missoula Road, Missoula, Montana 59804
- Region served: U.S. Forest Service
- Website: www.nationalforests.org

The National Forest Foundation, an American non-profit organization, was created by Congress in 1992 to be the official non-profit partner of the United States Forest Service. Its mission is to engage Americans in community-based national programs that promote the health and public enjoyment of the 193 million acre National Forest System. The foundation receives funding from Congress, soliciting additional funds from the private sector. The Forest Service is prohibited by law from soliciting outside funding, but the foundation has been expressly designated to fulfill that function.

== See also ==
- List of national forests of the United States
