= Cabela's Big Game Hunter 2012 =

2011 video game

- PlayStation 3 cover art
- Developer: Cauldron
- Publisher: Activision
- Series: Cabela's
- Platforms: PlayStation 3, Wii, Xbox 360
- Release: NA: September 27, 2011; EU: March 16, 2012
- Genre: Sports (hunting)
- Modes: Single-player, multiplayer

Cabela's Big Game Hunter 2012 is a hunting video game developed by Cauldron and published by Activision for the PlayStation 3, Wii and Xbox 360 in 2011.

== Gameplay ==
The game is set across five locations: Montana, Mexico, Texas, Namibia, and Alaska. Each region contains several hunts featuring different environments and wildlife native to the area, including forests, deserts, mountains, savannas, and tundra.

Players hunt a variety of animals while completing story-driven objectives and optional challenges. Gameplay includes the use of hunting equipment such as shooting blinds, tree stands, callers, and weapon rests. The returning “Hunter Sense” mechanic allows players to examine tracks and other evidence to recreate an animal’s recent movements through visual flashbacks.

The game places a greater emphasis on realism than previous entries in the series. Animals react dynamically to sound, movement, and scent, requiring players to approach targets carefully. Predators can also ambush the player unexpectedly, triggering a slow-motion “killer instinct” sequence that allows for quick defensive shots.

Certain missions feature stealth-based objectives in which players must avoid detection while approaching animals. A device known as the UTD measures how aware nearby animals are of the player’s presence. Other hunts are timed, requiring players to kill targets before they escape or external threats interfere.

In addition to the main campaign, the game includes shooting galleries and multiplayer modes. Players can create and customize hunting maps by placing terrain features, vegetation, and wildlife, then share them online with others. Weapons can also be purchased, upgraded, and customized for different hunting situations. The game was released alongside the Top Shot Elite, a hunting controller peripheral for the Playstation 3, Wii and Xbox 360.

== Story ==
John Sharp, a rookie big game hunter, is invited to participate in the 2012 Orion International Safari hosted by John Hathcock, a high-ranking member of the Order of Orion, an elite club of world-class big game hunters from all over the world. The competition includes French-Canadian marksman Olivier Mattise, South-African game warden Roger Friedkin, and American reality star Trey Cassidy.

The competition begins in Montana, where Sharp hunts several species of game before a wounded mountain lion threatens the area. Sharp tracks and kills the animal. The tournament then moves to Mexico, where tensions arise between Sharp and Mattise after Mattise trespasses into Sharp's hunting zone and disrupts a hunt. Hathcock intervenes and ends the event.

At Hathcock's ranch in Texas, the hunters continue the competition until Friedkin is injured after falling into a gorge caused by a collapsed hunting stand. Sharp protects him from a stampede of wild boars until help arrives. Friedkin later loses his left leg and withdraws from the tournament.

The next stage takes place in Namibia. During the hunt, Cassidy becomes trapped by a pride of lions. Sharp attempts to guide him to safety over the radio, but Cassidy disappears after gunshots are heard. Sharp later discovers Cassidy's abandoned equipment and kills several attacking lionesses before being rescued by Mattise, who shoots the pride's male lion. Cassidy is presumed dead after authorities fail to locate his body.

The final hunt occurs on Kodiak Island in Alaska as a severe blizzard approaches. The hunters pursue a notorious man-eating grizzly bear known as Bloody Ben, which has terrorized the island for years. During the confrontation, Mattise provokes the bear and is severely mauled. Sharp intervenes and kills Bloody Ben after a prolonged struggle, saving Mattise's life. Mattise subsequently acknowledges Sharp's victory in the competition. After the tournament, Sharp sells the bear's hide to the Order of Orion and uses the money to fund a trip to Hawaii the following summer.

== Development ==
All international versions of the game were localized in Activision's Dublin office.
