= Cabela's Dangerous Hunts 2011 =

2010 video game

- Developer: Cauldron
- Publisher: Activision
- Series: Cabela's
- Platforms: Nintendo DS; PlayStation 3; Xbox 360; Wii; iOS
- Release: NA: October 26, 2010; EU: March 23, 2011 (consoles); AU: May 6, 2011 (consoles)
- Genres: Hunting; action; Survival horror; simulation
- Modes: Single-player, multiplayer

Cabela's Dangerous Hunts 2011 is a hunting video game published by Activision in conjunction with Cabela's for the Nintendo DS, PlayStation 3, Xbox 360, iOS, and Wii. It was released in the U.S. for the DS, PlayStation 3, and Xbox 360 and for the Wii on October 26, 2010; special editions of the game were released for the PlayStation 3, Xbox 360, and Wii that same day bundled with the Top Shot Elite wireless hunting controller. It was released in Europe and Australia in 2011. The game's story features the character Cole Rainsford, who, along with his father, are on an African safari to hunt dangerous possessed animals that are terrorizing locals. The plot and script for the game was written by the screenwriter Brad Santos. Cabela's Dangerous Hunts 2011 also features shooting galleries as well as multi-level multiplayer modes. This game had an additional re-release for the Nintendo Wii titled Cabela's Dangerous Hunts 2011: Special Edition, which included an exclusive optional "cell-shaded animation mode". The game received mixed reviews from critics.

== Plot ==
=== Home console versions ===
In 1982, Samson Rainsford, Mbeki, and his friend hunt a creature called the "Kaftar" in a cave in Uganda, believed to be a demon that can only be destroyed by fire. After hearing hyena-like laughter, Samson turns off the lights and turns them back on, and the Kaftar attacks both him and Mbeki's friend. Mbeki shoots it, but the bullet has no effect. Mbeki's friend sees the creature attacking Samson and makes a run for the exit, but the Kaftar strikes him.

In 2001, Cole Rainsford is a beginner hunter in Alaska, learning under his scarred, weathered father. The Rainsfords find a campsite ransacked by a rogue grizzly bear. As the family tracks the bear, an avalanche separates Cole from Samson and Adrian, Cole's brother and a more skilled hunter; as a result, he is Samson's favored son. He survives the avalanche, crawls out of the debris, and continues tracking the bear into the night. Then, Cole fights the grizzly bear and kills it. Adrian shows up and compliments him when a pack of black wolves with glowing red eyes bursts out of nowhere and attacks Cole and Adrian. Adrian is mauled to death and dragged away by the wolves as Cole watches helplessly.

After ten years of not speaking to his father, who has become embittered over losing Adrian because of his actions, Cole, now a professional big-game hunter, decides to join Samson and Mbeki back in Uganda in search of the Kaftar. A hippo knocks over their boat, separating Cole from Mbeki and Samson. Cole finds Mbeki, who shows him brush fires being set by the villagers in an attempt to drive off what they believe is the returned Kaftar, which is causing the animals to go rabid. Mbeki warns Cole that the Kaftar is thought to be able to control people or shapeshift into a person as a werehyena. A leopard attacks Mbeki, and Cole kills it. Mbeki tells Cole to find medical help. As he walks along, Cole eventually finds two trucks owned by poachers and steals one. Cole picks up Mbeki, but a mad white rhinoceros starts chasing after him. After killing it, Mbeki thanks Cole, then pushes him down and leaves, saying he should not have come.

That night, Cole searches for Mbeki during a wildfire and finds him in an abandoned research facility known as the "Nightfall Program," which studied animal behavior. The program captured the Kaftar and tried to replicate its ability to control other animals, but it caused a breakout and escaped. The next morning, Cole finds baboons raiding the facility and fights them off. Later, Cole sees other baboons attacking Mbeki in the distance. He snipes them and races towards Mbeki as he slowly passes away. After giving Cole the key to the caverns, Mbeki dies. Cole heads for the caves where Samson was attacked years before. After he finds him, Samson tells his son to follow him to the exit, not wanting Cole to die like Adrian, but he steps on a land mine on the way. Cole looks for an exit, but a pack of spotted hyenas attacks at the Kaftar's behest. Eventually, Cole finds an underground ladder leading to his father's cabin, only to find it on fire. He walks in, and the Kaftar, revealed to be a large, striped hyena-like monster, jumps through a window to attack him. Cole downs the beast and traps it under a chandelier, then escapes as the house burns.

=== DS and iOS versions ===
Hunter Cole Rainsford is hired by his father, Samson, to eliminate a pride of man-eating lions terrorizing his estate in Uganda. Guided over the radio by Mbeki, an old friend of Samson's, Cole learns that his father may be in danger. After surviving several lion attacks in an abandoned village, Cole tracks the pride to a lair near an abandoned mine. With Mbeki's help, Cole exterminates the lions, but Mbeki insists the real danger remains. He goes on to tell Cole the legend of the Kaftar, a demonic werehyena capable of controlling animals. Mbeki explains that he and Samson once attempted to bag the Kaftar for a covert research group, but the creature’s evil corrupted Samson. He warns Cole that Samson can no longer be saved and that death is the only cure.

The game periodically cuts between Cole's journey towards Samson's lodge and flashbacks to ten years earlier, when a younger Cole was with his brother Adrian and Samson in Alaska. During a hunting trip, Cole falls into a chasm and becomes separated from his family. While traveling back to the lodge, he finds a camcorder containing footage of hikers being killed by a grizzly bear. Samson and Adrian are determined to track it before nightfall, against Cole's wishes. As Cole tries to catch up to his family, he learns Adrian split off to track the bear alone. By the time Cole reaches him, Adrian has already been killed. The grizzly then attacks Cole, but he kills it. As Cole mourns his brother's death, a mysterious creature watches him from above.

In the present, Cole discovers catacombs with evidence of ritualistic killings and battles increasingly aggressive, seemingly possessed wildlife. Cole ultimately confronts his father, accusing him of training the grizzly bear responsible for the deaths of Adrian and the hikers. Proud of the hunter Cole has become, Samson urges him to prepare for the Kaftar's arrival. At the lodge, Cole fights through hordes of possessed animals before finally confronting and killing the Kaftar itself. After defeating the creature, Cole sets Samson's lodge ablaze to destroy the evil tied to his family's past.

== Reception ==
Reception

Aggregate score
Aggregator	Score			
Aggregator	PC	PS3	Wii	Xbox 360
Metacritic	N/A	60/100	N/A	55/100

Review scores
Publication	Score			
Publication	PC	PS3	Wii	Xbox 360
GameSpot	N/A	6/10	6/10	6/10
Push Square	N/A	7/10	N/A	N/A
TouchArcade	N/A	N/A	N/A	N/A

Destructoid called the game's box art ridiculous. A preview from GameSpot describes the game as "survival game first and a hunting game second", that players must fend off dangerous animals that stalk them as well as face various environmental hazards. A preview from UGO says that the change of numbering in the series from sequel numbers to years makes the series look like it's copying the Madden NFL franchise. However, the preview said that the game was successful in creating terrifying effects which included fearsome animals in dark environments, and that it featured a well-constructed shooting gallery mode. Another preview from Destructoid said that the game had more of a Resident Evil feel with the presence of large wolves. They add that the game's intentionally sensitive controls add to the survival-horror gameplay environment, in which hunters normally need to remain still while surrounded by hordes of beasts. The preview also praises the Top Shot Elite for its smooth handling and for its inclusion of an infrared scope, which it says adds to the level of realism to the gameplay. David Scammell of Gamerzines described the game as 'awesome m8' and cited the Top Shot Elite as the forty third best peripheral of 2011.

This game works with PlayStation Move.
