= Cabela's Dangerous Hunts 2013 =

2012 video game

- Developer: Cauldron
- Publisher: Activision
- Series: Cabela's
- Platforms: Wii U; PlayStation 3; Xbox 360; Windows; Wii
- Release: October 23, 2012
- Genres: Hunting; action; simulation
- Modes: Single-player; multiplayer

Cabela's Dangerous Hunts 2013 is a first-person shooter light gun hunting video game developed by Cauldron and published by Activision on October 23, 2012, for PlayStation 3, Xbox 360, Microsoft Windows and Wii. A Wii U port was released later on December 4, 2012. The game's story features Jacob Marshall as he tries to hunt in Africa, while remembering a past hunting trip in Alaska with his father and brother.

== Plot ==
The game opens with young brothers Jacob and Luke Marshall on a hunting trip in Alaska with their father, a park ranger. They are tracking an unusually aggressive scar-faced grizzly bear. When the bear attacks, Luke saves Jacob by pulling him up a cliff instead of shooting it. When the bear comes again, the father jumps in its path to protect his sons and manages to kill it with his final shot at the cost of his own life.

Over the next ten years, Jacob and Luke grow estranged. Jacob becomes a conservationist and takes his father's job, while Luke gains a reputation as a hunter of man-eaters. They agree to reunite on their father's birthday with a hunting safari in Uganda that he used to take. During the safari, Luke learns that a local man was dragged away from his children by a black lion, a creature previously thought mythical. Being reminded of the death of his own father, Luke is enraged and takes off alone in pursuit of the man-eater; Jacob follows to assist him, against Luke's wishes.

The game periodically cuts between Jacob's pursuit of Luke through the African jungle and flashbacks to the earlier hunting trip in Alaska, where Jacob and Luke followed their father after reports of a grizzly bear attack called him away. Jacob saves Luke's life from a pack of wolves, and the two eventually encounter the scar-faced grizzly bear that would later kill their father.

In the present, Jacob ultimately enters an ancient ruined city, where he encounters the black lion and its pride. The black lion pushes Luke off a cliff, but he manages to grab the ledge. Mirroring their encounter with the grizzly ten years earlier, Jacob chooses to pull his brother up the cliff instead of taking the final shot at the black lion; however, he still kills the lion after saving his brother.

== Gameplay ==
Cabela's Dangerous Hunts 2013 combines elements of first-person shooters and on-rails light gun games, and was designed to be playable with either the top-shot Fearmaster Light Gun or the Wii remote. The game is also playable with a standard controller setup.

Players navigate the environment from a first-person perspective, and must defend themselves from waves of predators and other hostile animals. The player's arsenal includes a Desert Eagle with unlimited ammunition, a pump-action shotgun, a scoped bolt-action rifle, and a crossbow. Targeting and shooting enemies can be done with a light gun; alternatively, when using a standard controller the game features a snap-to targeting system where the player's aim automatically locks onto the nearest enemy when aiming down the sights of their currently equipped weapon. If the player is attacked from behind, a warning prompt will appear on-screen, and the player can trigger a "killer instinct" slow-motion mode where they will spin around and be given the opportunity to shoot the enemy before it can land a hit. Through two sensors placed on the Fearmaster Light Gun, the game is able to collect the information about the player's heart rate. That data is displayed on a meter that opens up during zoom-ins, granting an additional zoom as long as the number is low. All shots aimed at particular places will deliver more damage with a special bonus.

The game has three different game modes; Story, Maneater, and Shooting Gallery. Story Mode is the game's main game mode. Maneater is an arcade-style arena combat mode where the player fights multiple waves of hostile animals alone or with another person in splitscreen. Shooting Gallery is an on-rails shooter mode in which up to four players take turns traveling on a fixed path while shooting passing big game and defending themselves from attacking predators. This mode uses rail-shooter game mechanics, with aiming either being done with a light gun or an on-screen floating crosshair cursor.
