= Maximum Force =

1997 arcade game

- North American arcade flyer
- Developer: Mesa Logic: PlayStation, Saturn Tantalus Interactive Windows Perfect Entertainment
- Publishers: NA: Atari Games; JP: SNK; PlayStation, Saturn; NA: Midway Games; EU: GT Interactive Windows; EU: GT Interactive
- Producer: Rob Rowe
- Designer: Robert Weatherby
- Programmers: Charlie Grisafi; David G. Mahaffey
- Artists: Guy Fumagalli, James Webb
- Composer: John Paul
- Platforms: Arcade, PlayStation, Sega Saturn, Windows
- Release: February 1997: Arcade February 1997 PlayStation; NA: October 9, 1997; EU: November 1997 Saturn; NA: October 9, 1997; EU: March 1998 Windows; EU: 1998
- Genre: Light gun shooter
- Modes: Single-player, multiplayer
- Arcade system: COJAG

Maximum Force is a light gun shooter arcade game developed by Mesa Logic for Atari Games in 1997. In 1998, Atari Games re-released the game as part of one machine called Area 51/Maximum Force Duo that also included Area 51, and later ported the game to the PlayStation and Sega Saturn.

Like its predecessor Area 51, Maximum Force uses digitized video stored on an on-board hard disk, and red gibs into which every enemy blows apart when shot, in exactly the same way. While enemies, innocents, and explosions are 2D digitized video sprites, the levels and vehicles are pre-rendered in 3D.

Released into markets increasingly dominated by games with polygon graphics, Maximum Force was a critical failure, with many citing generic and dated gameplay, unrealistic death animations, and short length, but a commercial success.

== Gameplay ==
The player(s) play the role of an unnamed counter-terrorist agent who engages in three major combat zones: a cargo ship at a dock, a large bank, and a jungle. The first two zones can be played in any order. These areas are under siege by terrorists and the player must kill the terrorists before they take aim and fire at the player character. Shooting hostages or getting shot by terrorists causes the player to lose lives. After four hits are taken, the player must refill their credits or the game is over. Players can have a maximum of seven lives in the home versions.

There are several power-ups in the game, such as rapid-fire mode (which is indicated by a spinning assault rifle bullet) for the player's gun or a powerful single-shot mode (which is indicated by a spinning shotgun shell). Shooting windows, barrels, cars, and other objects increases the player's score. Like in Area 51, shooting certain objects in an area will transport the player to a secret bonus zone, most often a shooting exercise, for extra points.

== Development ==
The game made its world debut on January 21, 1997 at the Amusement Trades Exhibition International show in London.

== Reception ==
Reception

Aggregate score
Aggregator	Score
GameRankings	45% (PS1)

Review scores
Publication	Score
CNET Gamecenter	4/10 (SAT)
Electronic Gaming Monthly	4/10, 4/10, 6/10, 5/10 (PS)
Game Informer	7/10 (PS1, SAT)
GameSpot	4.7/10 (PS); 4.4/10 (SAT)
IGN	5/10 (PS)
Next Generation	2/5 (ARC)
Official U.S. PlayStation Magazine	1.5/5 (PS1)
PC Gamer (UK)	21% (PC)
PC Zone	30% (PC)
Sega Saturn Magazine	71% (SAT)

Maximum Force was a moderate success in arcades.

Reviewing the arcade version, Next Generation said that the game "puts a new face on the same old game, and while it's tempting to say that it gets away with it, in the end, it really just doesn't."

The home console versions also met with mediocre reviews. Critics overwhelmingly remarked that digitized light gun shooting was overfamiliar or even outdated, though some added that Maximum Force was superior to most games in that style, including Area 51. In particular, they praised the sound effects and the smoothly animated video with natural-feeling transitions between locations. Sega Saturn Magazine elaborated, "The video backgrounds move very smoothly, and the baddies actually seem to fit in with the rest of the graphics, rather than looking as if they've been stuck in as an afterthought. The only problem with having this graphics system is the way the enemies are killed - the big splodge of red cartoon blood ..."

However, many critics also remarked that the 30-minute length, while decent by arcade standards, was unacceptably short for a home console game, and that the lack of alternate routes to choose from leaves Maximum Force with little replay value. Most reviews assessed the game as overall bland compared to the alternatives, with IGN stating that "Maximum Force isn't as bad as Revolution X or some of the other ones floating around, but it's no Time Crisis either." Game Informer was more positive, describing it as a fun and replayable game which had been converted faithfully to both the PlayStation and the Saturn, but likewise concluded that it was outshone by competitors like Time Crisis. Jeff Gerstmann commented in GameSpot that it "simply falls short. Gamers will be better served by picking up Virtua Cop 2 or even Die Hard Trilogy." Shawn Smith of Electronic Gaming Monthly summarized, "I suppose if you take this game for what it is (a standard B-movie type gun game), then it's not half bad. But if you're looking for something more serious, along the lines of a Virtua Cop 2, then you shouldn't even consider it." GamePro concluded, "Gamers who enjoyed all those gun games of the past will find familiar ground in Maximum Force. However, if you're looking for a real evolutionary step in this genre, you'll have to keep looking." (Note: GamePro gave the PlayStation version 3/5 for graphics, 4/5 for sound, and two 2.5/5 scores for control and fun factor.)

== See also ==
- Target: Terror
