= Toy Story Mania! (video game) =

2009 video game

- North American Wii box art
- Developers: Papaya Studio (Wii/PC); High Voltage Software (PS3/360)
- Publishers: Disney Interactive Studios; Disney Mobile Studios (iOS)
- Composer: Billy Martin
- Series: Toy Story
- Platforms: iOS, Wii, Microsoft Windows, Xbox 360, PlayStation 3
- Release: iOS: NA: August 14, 2009; Wii: NA: September 15, 2009; EU: September 24, 2009; AU: October 13, 2009; PC: EU: April 9, 2010; PlayStation 3 & Xbox 360: NA: October 30, 2012
- Genre: Party
- Modes: Single-player, multiplayer

Toy Story Mania! is a 2009 party video game published by Disney Interactive Studios and developed by Papaya Studio for the Wii and PC versions and by High Voltage Software for the PlayStation 3 and Xbox 360 versions. It is based on the Toy Story Midway Mania! attraction located at Disney's California Adventure and Disney's Hollywood Studios, which was inspired by the Toy Story movie series produced by Pixar. The game features single-player and multi-player shooting-gallery style gameplay.

The game was released on August 14, 2009 for iOS, on September 15 for the Wii console, on April 9, 2010 for PC exclusively in Europe, and on October 30, 2012 for Xbox 360 and PlayStation 3. It was packaged with a Ray Gun peripheral on its European release. The game has also been released as a Plug n Play device in early 2010.

Toy Story Mania! is the first game based on a film by Pixar to be published by Disney Interactive Studios. Past Disney/Pixar movie games have been made in conjunction with Activision first, then THQ.

Included in each game are two pairs of 3D glasses. These can be used in six 3D shooting galleries.

== Design ==
In the Midway Mania! attraction, riders play a series of carnival games hosted by characters from the film series, such as Buzz Lightyear and Sheriff Woody, by shooting various targets at each "game booth". For example, in one game, riders toss "rings" onto Little Green Men in a game hosted by Buzz Lightyear.

The video game version has levels based on those used in the theme park attractions, as well as original levels based on other characters and scenes in the film series. The theme park attraction features two riders playing on the same screen, while the video game version will allow up to four players to play at the same time either competitively or cooperatively.

== Reception ==
Reception

Aggregate score
Aggregator	Score	
Aggregator	Wii	Xbox 360
Metacritic	49/100	33/100

Review scores
Publication	Score	
Publication	Wii	Xbox 360
GameRevolution	D	N/A
GamesRadar+	2.5/5	N/A
GameZone	5/10	N/A
IGN	6/10	N/A
Nintendo World Report	7/10	N/A
PALGN	5/10	N/A
Digital Spy	N/A	1/5

Reviews are mixed. Metacritic gave it a score of 49 out of 100 for the Wii version and 33 out of 100 for the Xbox 360 version.
