= Crypt Killer =

1995 video game

- North American arcade flyer
- Developer: Konami (Note: PlayStation and Saturn versions developed by Konami Computer Entertainment Tokyo; Windows version developed by Konami Computer Games Aoyama and System Sacom.)
- Publisher: Konami
- Director: Kuniaki Kakuwa
- Producer: Hideki Oyama
- Programmers: Tadasu Kitae; Hisataka Yoshikawa; Mitsuhiro Nozaki
- Artists: Kuniaki Kakuwa; Mitsuhiro Nomi; Motoki Toyama
- Composers: Yuji Takenouchi; Mutsuhiko Izumi
- Platforms: Arcade, PlayStation, Sega Saturn, Windows
- Release: Arcade: JP: September 1995; NA: November 1995; PlayStation, Saturn: JP: March 7, 1997; PAL: March 21, 1997; NA: April 24, 1997; Windows: JP: 1997
- Genre: Light gun shooter
- Modes: Single-player, multiplayer
- Arcade system: Konami System GQ

Crypt Killer (released as Henry Explorers (Note: ヘンリーエクスプローラーズ Henrī Ekusupurōrāzu) in Japan) is a 1995 light gun shooter video game developed and published by Konami for arcades. Ports for the PlayStation and Sega Saturn were released in 1997, along with a CD-ROM conversion for Microsoft Windows released exclusively in Japan the same year. The Saturn version makes use of Sega's Virtua Gun (released as the Stunner in North America), whereas the PlayStation version is compatible with Konami's own Hyper Blaster light gun peripheral (released in North America as The Justifier). The game's scenery and characters are all 3D polygon models, while most of the enemies and their projectiles are 2D sprites.

== Plot ==
The players are "crypt raiders" guided by Galazon, the spirit of travels, who resembles a floating head to travel through variously themed caves, temples and crypts in search of the "Eyes of Guidance" which would open the doors of fate. On their journey they are armed with a shotgun to fend off many mythical enemies, such as mummies, skeletons, fish-men, gargoyles, and an array of other monsters.

== Gameplay ==
One, two or three players simultaneously travel through levels "on rails", as in the vast majority of light gun shooters. At certain points on each level the players choose their path by selecting to go one of two different ways. The opening screen allows the player to choose from any of the six levels. There are three areas (besides the boss area) per level. At the end of each level, the player encounters a boss guarding the "Eyes of Guidance" needed to progress. The player can temporally upgrade their weapon by finding concealed more powerful guns such as a Gatling gun, grenade launcher, a more powerful shotgun, and an automatic hidden behind breakable objects. In the console versions, for each life the player has three bombs which can destroy all enemies on screen.

Every time the player finds two Eyes of Guidance, an ending is revealed, although Galazon tells the players to keep playing until they clear all six levels. All endings start with placing the Eyes of Guidance in the statue. The eye obtained is either red or blue depending on the path chosen at the end of Act 2 in each level. Depending on the color combination of the two eyes that are obtained, the endings are:

- Normal/Good Ending: He encounters a skeleton, shoots it, and says that he is somehow tricked by an ancient text. The player finds the real treasure. This ending is reached if the first eye is blue and the other is red.
- Behind-The-Scenes Ending: The player directs a movie based from the game, and it is revealed that the monsters (skeletons, fish-men, gargoyles, etc.) are stunt men and actors. This ending is reached if both eyes are blue.
- Bad Ending: The player finds many treasure chests in a river which turns out to be fake. Then he is surrounded by all the bosses in the game. The player tries to escape but is killed. This ending is reached if both eyes are red.
- Legendary Sword Ending: The player finds a legendary sword. He activates its powers, consequently becoming its wielder. This ending is reached if the first eye is red and the other is blue.

== Reception ==
Reception

Aggregate score
Aggregator	Score
GameRankings	46% (PS1)

Review scores
Publication	Score
Electronic Gaming Monthly	4.625/10 (PS1)
GameSpot	3.8/10 (PS1)
Next Generation	2/5 (ARC)
Sega Saturn Magazine	47% (SAT)

Reviewing the arcade version, a Next Generation critic praised Crypt Killer's ending but summed up that "besides the free-moving, hand-held sawed-off shotgun, enabling pump-handle reloading (a nice element), this game blends in quite well with the pile of new laser-gun shooters with little distinction."

The Saturn and PlayStation versions received overwhelmingly negative reviews, with critics deriding the heavily pixelated and blocky graphics, the lack of scariness in the enemies' appearance, the numerous cheap hits, and the player character's overdone acrobatics, which cause the perspective to spin and bounce around frequently in a nauseating manner. Lee Nutter of Sega Saturn Magazine was particularly vehement in his criticism, remarking that "more fun could be derived from the Virtua Gun if you were to spend an entire evening pistol whipping yourself with it". A sidebar on the seven light gun games which had been released for the Saturn in the UK up to that point showed that Crypt Killer had the lowest rating from Sega Saturn Magazine. Dan Hsu of Electronic Gaming Monthly defended the game, saying it "deserves a look" due to its unique mythical theme, but his three co-reviewers gave firmly negative assessments. GamePro remarked that "Although the action gets frantic, it never intensifies to the point of hysteria, the way a good shooter like Area 51 does." GameSpot's Jeff Kitts found the game's poor quality especially unforgivable since it came from the same company as the seminal light gun game Lethal Enforcers.
