= Arcade1Up =

Computer hardware production company

- Industry: Video games
- Founded: September 2018; 7 years ago
- Founder: Scott Bachrach
- Headquarters: Miami, Florida, U.S.
- Key people: Dora Dvir (Interim CEO of Tastemakers, Inc.); Scott Bachrach (Founder and Former CEO)

Arcade1Up is a computer hardware production company that specializes in the production of working 3/4 scale arcade cabinets that play arcade video games using modern components and emulation.

== History ==
Arcade1Up was established as a subsidiary of Tastemakers, Inc. in 2018 by its CEO Scott Bachrach. In June 2017, Bachrach had been involved in a meeting discussing the growing interest in retrogaming. The topic of retro arcade gaming had come up, and while the members had identified efforts to recreate arcade cabinets, these typically cost thousands of U.S. dollars and were heavy, a form that would not be suitable for smaller consumers at home or offices, or use in locations like arcade bars. Bachrach decided to launch Arcade1Up as to provide an alternative solution to these custom recreations.

Arcade1Up opted for crafting 3/4-scale versions of arcade cabinets as to make them more amenable to fit into homes and businesses. The cabinets were prepared as ready-to-assemble kits for the consumer to complete at home, providing pre-cut fiberboard frame components for the cabinet's sides including stickers for the game marquees, a 17" LCD screen, controller panel, and emulation hardware and power componentry to run the game. A basic unit has an MSRP of about $250 through major retailers and Arcade1Up's own website. These cabinets typically are about 4 feet (1.2 m) high and weigh under 60 pounds (27 kg) once assembled. As this can be a bit short for playing while standing, Arcade1Up also provided optional risers to lift the cabinet by about 1 foot (0.30 m). Their initial production had some reported quality control issues, which the company used to improve future products.

Initially, the company sought licenses for the early 1970s and 1980s arcade games from Namco, Midway, and Atari, then later added games from the 1990s and beyond. Most systems ship with between two and twelve games from the same family or genre of games that shared the same control set; for example, their Pac-Man cabinet includes Pac-Man Plus, while Centipede includes three other Atari games that used trackball controls, Millipede, Missile Command, and Crystal Castles. The control panels are modeled based on the original games. For multiplayer fighting and brawler games that support more than two players, such as the four-player Teenage Mutant Ninja Turtles, the smaller scale of the cabinet had initially created problems with players crowding around the controls. Arcade1Up created special full-size controller decks to give enough room for each player to have space at the cabinet. Where possible, Arcade1Up has added remote multiplayer functionality over Wi-Fi connections.

The company has since branched to other product offerings. It offers smaller sized "counter-cades" that can be set on a bar or table, typically which ship with between two and five games. It also offers sit-down table cabinets for head-to-head games.

In June 2020, Arcade1Up in partnership with Zen Studios announced the first in its line of 3/4th-scale replica pinball machines, using Zen Studios' pinball video game software played out on a monitor. Zen Studios, which had already acquired licenses to develop pinball tables based on Marvel and Star Wars properties, provided these tables for Arcade1Up's hardware. The company also acquired the license for replica light gun games, starting with Big Buck Hunter. They released their first sit-down style cabinet including steering wheel controls in November 2020 for the game Out Run.

In October 2020, Arcade1Up successfully completed a Kickstarter for its Infinity Table, a table with a built-in touchscreen programmed for numerous board and card games, including several licensed from Hasbro, based on the same design principles behind their arcade cabinet reconstructions.

The continued rising interest in retrogaming helped Arcade1Up to strong sales, and by May 2020 they had sold their one millionth unit. They also saw a large surge in sales as the COVID-19 pandemic started in March 2020, forcing many people to be quarantined at home and turning to video games as a pastime. From March to May 2020, sales had grown on average of 96% week-over-week. By the start of 2022, they had sold over 3 million units.

At CES 2022, Arcade1Up announced a new line of full-sized cabinets, matching the size of classic arcade game chassis. These replicas include 19" screens and new SuzoHapp controls which were common for original arcade games.

In December 2025, Arcade1Up was widely rumored to be partially or completely shutting down operations However, in February 2026 it was revealed that select assets of the company had been acquired by Basic Fun!
