= Steel Gunner 2 =

1992 video game

- Advertising flyer
- Developer: Namco
- Publisher: Namco
- Series: Steel Gunner
- Platform: Arcade
- Release: JP: March 9, 1992; NA: April 1992
- Genre: First-person shooter
- Modes: Single-player, multiplayer

Steel Gunner 2 (Note: Japanese: スティールガンナー２, Hepburn: Sutīru Gannā Tsū) is a 1992 first-person shooter game developed and released by Namco for arcades. It is the sequel to Steel Gunner, which had been released in 1990. It was also sold as a conversion kit for Taito's Operation Thunderbolt (1988).

== Gameplay ==
The player gunning down groups of enemies in the third level.

Steel Gunner is a first-person shooter video game. Its plot involves a terrorist group named Vanguard attacking the town of Neo Arc City, New Jersey using its army of cyborgs and robots. The Neo Arc City Police request the aid of Garcia and Cliff, police officers that pilot robotic suits known as Gargoyles, to destroy Vanguard and protect Neo Arc City.

The players must take control of the Neo Arc policemen, Garcia and Cliff, but this time they are on a mission to destroy the evil army of Vanguard who are attacking the city. Some of the enemies from the original game make comebacks, but have undergone a makeover since the first time Neo Arc saw them, in 1990 - and several new enemies have also been introduced as well. Again, the players can shoot anything on the screen, including background objects, and even innocent bystanders (of which there are only eight types now as opposed to ten); if they should do the latter it will cause them to lose energy as if they got hit by an enemy.

== Reception ==
Reception

Review scores
Publication	Score
Gamest	38/70
Play Meter	93%

In Japan, Game Machine listed Steel Gunner 2 in their April 15, 1992 issue as being the eighth most-popular upright arcade game at the time. In North America, RePlay reported the game to be the seventh most-popular arcade game at the time.
