= Puffy: P.S. I Love You =

1999 video game

- Developer: Sony Music Entertainment
- Publisher: Sony Music Entertainment
- Platform: PlayStation
- Release: JP: March 11, 1999
- Genres: Music, Mini-games
- Mode: Single-player

Puffy: P.S. I Love You is a game released in 1999 for the PlayStation, starring Japanese rock stars Puffy AmiYumi. The game was controlled using a light gun. Peculiarly enough, the title is a homage to The Beatles song "P.S. I Love You", from their Please Please Me album.

The gameplay used footage from a variety of PUFFY's concerts, to which players would shoot soda cans out of their cannons.
