= Virtua Cop 2 =

1995 video game

- Japanese arcade flyer
- Developer: Sega AM2
- Publisher: Sega
- Director: Wataru Kawashima
- Producer: Yu Suzuki
- Programmer: Shunsuke Sekikawa
- Artist: Akihito Hiroyoshi
- Composer: Hideaki Miyamoto
- Series: Virtua Cop
- Platforms: Arcade, Sega Saturn, Windows, Dreamcast, PlayStation 2
- Release: September 1995: Arcade; JP: September 1995; NA: November 1995; EU: 1996 Saturn; JP/NA: November 22, 1996; EU: November 28, 1996 Windows; NA: November 24, 1997; EU: 1997; JP: December 5, 1997 Dreamcast; JP: March 2, 2000 PlayStation 2; JP: August 25, 2002; EU: November 29, 2002
- Genres: Light gun shooter, rail shooter
- Modes: Single-player, multiplayer
- Arcade system: Sega Model 2

Virtua Cop 2 is a 1995 light gun shooter video game developed by Sega AM2 and published by Sega for arcades. It was ported to the Sega Saturn in 1996, Windows in 1997, and Dreamcast in 2000. It was bundled with Virtua Cop in Virtua Cop: Elite Edition for PlayStation 2 in 2002. This game was known as Virtua Squad 2 for the North American PC release. The game was succeeded by Virtua Cop 3.

== Gameplay ==
The game features three levels through which the player's movement is automated on a predetermined path. However, unlike the first Virtua Cop, at certain points the player picks their route from two possible choices. It is the player's job to shoot the criminals that appear before time runs out and they shoot back, while taking care not to shoot any innocent bystanders. Along the way there are various objects in the background that can be broken if shot, some of which will reveal power ups afterwards. As with the first Virtua Cop, players earn extra points for "justice shots", meaning shooting an enemy's gun hand to disarm them without killing them. By consistently defeating enemies without taking hits or shooting hostages, the player increases the multiplier which is applied every time they earn points. At the end of each level there is a boss battle, as well as one extra final boss battle after all three levels have been finished.

A combat training simulator, the "Proving Ground", simulates a variety of life-threatening situations. Each Proving Ground stage is designed to simulate a hostile urban environment thronging with enemies. The goal of each stage is to blast through the crowd of thugs while hunting down and taking out the rival player.

== Characters ==
- Michael Hardy (Rage) - Two years later, this cop has grown up with his partner, James Cools and a newcomer cop, Janet Marshall. He could do better than anyone else, including his part-time job and his duty training. He is known to be a quick draw when things get under fire. Rage is an all-around character in the game.
- James Cools (Smarty) - Like his partner, Michael who worked the same side for the good as well as he does, this doesn't stop him from beating by some bad guys. Although Rage is quicker on the draw in a gunfight, Smarty is known to be the top shot in the police force.
- Janet Marshall (Janet) - A newly installed special VCPD detective in the Virtua Cop special investigations squad (although the only female cop in the squad), Janet fights for her deceased partner.

Normally, Rage is the character for Player 1 in the beginner and expert stages and Smarty in the medium stage, but a cheat code in the Saturn version allows Player 1 to play as Janet, who is normally Player 2 in the beginner and medium stages.

== Plot ==
Michael "Rage" Hardy and James "Smarty" Cools shut down the E.V.I.L Inc. criminal empire. Three of its leaders, King, Boss, and Kong are all in the maximum security federal pen. The final, fourth member of the E.V.I.L Inc. gang, international terrorist Joe Fang is believed to have been killed in a helicopter crash, though his body was never found. After the downfall of E.V.I.L Inc., a comprehensive investigation of their black market and gun-running activities was launched in the Virtua City bank. Meanwhile, the Virtua City Police Special Investigations Unit got a new member in the shape of Janet Marshall, an expert in criminal psychology profiling.

The vice-president of the Virtua City Bank is killed in shady circumstances that are only officially termed accidental. And the swollen accounts of the now-defunct E.V.I.L Syndicate, which he had been suspected of laundering, are emptied overnight. The missing funds amount to more than the GNP of most small countries.

Meanwhile, on the other side of town, there is a daring daylight raid on the biggest jewelers in the state. The mayor is held hostage at a ship. And at the site of the new subway construction, there's been an unusual amount of unexplained activity involving some very suspicious-looking material.

After solving all three cases and foiling Joe Fang's plan the players have a final shootdown with Joe Fang attacking the player while on a jet pack. The player ultimately defeats him to end his reign of terror and end the game.

== Development ==
When questioned about Sega AM2's plans for Virtua Cop 2 in a February 1995 interview, AM2 manager Fumio Kurokawa stated "We're not sure if there will be [a] VC2. However, since the original VC did well at the arcades, we are certainly thinking about something to follow up."

The Saturn version was demonstrated at the May 1996 Electronic Entertainment Expo, at which point only the first level was in a playable state. Development was slowed because AM2's resources were prioritized for the Saturn versions of Fighting Vipers and Virtua Fighter Kids.

Virtua Cop 2 was re-released in 2001 as part of the Sega Smash Pack: Volume 1 compilation for Dreamcast. The game was later bundled with Virtua Cop in Japan and Europe on the PlayStation 2 as Virtua Cop: Elite Edition (Virtua Cop Rebirth in Japan) on August 25 and November 29, 2002, respectively.

== Reception ==
Reception

Aggregate score
Aggregator	Score
GameRankings	84% (SAT)

Review scores
Publication	Score
Electronic Gaming Monthly	8/10, 8.5/10, 8/10, 8/10 (SAT)
GameSpot	7.1/10 (SAT)
Next Generation	4/5 (ARC & SAT)
Sega Saturn Magazine	95% (SAT)

=== Arcade ===
In Japan, Game Machine listed Virtua Cop 2 on their November 1, 1995 issue as being the second most-successful dedicated arcade game of the month. It went on to become the highest-grossing dedicated arcade video game of 1996 in Japan. It was reported to have sold 7,000 arcade cabinets worldwide by 1996, including 4,000 units in Japan and 3,000 units overseas.

Reviewing the arcade version, a Next Generation critic commented that "the action, enemies, variation of levels and backgrounds, and the fun are all so improved over Virtua Cop 1, and in all the right places, that no other laser-gun shooter comes close to it right now." He especially praised the high frame rate, the level design, the need for skilled aiming, and the way the game is paced such that bouts of intense shootouts with "multitudes of terrorists" are broken by short pauses to give the player a breather.

=== Saturn ===
As with the original Virtua Cop, the Saturn version of Virtua Cop 2 received mostly positive reviews for its fun gameplay and close translation of the arcade version, while being criticized as too lacking in longevity for a home console game. However, some critics, rather than complaining about the longevity, noted that while it takes about the same amount of time to complete a single playthrough as in the original, the game is much longer than the first Virtua Cop when taking into account all the different level branches.

Reviews generally hailed the game as a considerable improvement over the already impressive original, due to its more interactive environments and higher intensity, especially in the chase scenes. Next Generation elaborated, "Taking the game one step closer to the feel of a big budget action movie, Virtua Cop 2 seems to have more 'movement' to it. ... Whether chasing down an armored car while picking off bad guys hanging out the window, or dodging bullets in a speeding subway train, this game is just short of being described as a roller coaster ride by some hack movie critic in the Midwest and even closer to being described as an 'edge of your seat thriller' by this reviewer on the West coast." GamePro had a somewhat more tempered response, arguing that one can still quickly memorize the game, making repeat plays increasingly routine. They concluded, "For lightgun fans, VC2's a solid buy. Otherwise, its short-lived but frenzied fun makes for a top Saturn rental."

The four reviewers of Electronic Gaming Monthly had similar reactions, while Rich Leadbetter of Sega Saturn Magazine argued that even the shorter Virtua Cop has far more longevity than it is usually given credit for, as both it and the sequel have numerous modes and approaches that can provide players with new challenges on repeat plays. Tom Ham wrote in GameSpot, "While the first Virtua Cop set a new standard for light gun shooters, Sega and the AM2 team have delivered an incredible sequel that takes the concept to a whole new level."

Electronic Gaming Monthly named the Saturn version a runner-up for Shooter Game of the Year (behind Alien Trilogy). In 1997, they named the Saturn version number 98 on their "100 Best Games of All Time", citing its addition of branching levels and innovative stage design to the series' revolutionary use of polygonal enemies which move realistically and react differently depending on where they are shot.
