= Golly! Ghost! =

1991 video game

- Developer: Namco
- Publisher: Namco
- Designers: Shigeki Toyama; Hiroshi Ono
- Artist: Hiroshi Ono
- Composer: Etsuo Ishii
- Series: Golly! Ghost!
- Platform: Arcade
- Release: JP: July 1991; NA: 1991; AU: October 1991
- Genre: Light gun shooter
- Modes: Single-player, multiplayer

Golly! Ghost! (Note: Japanese: ゴーリー! ゴースト!, Hepburn: Gorī! Gōsuto!) is a 1991 light gun shooter arcade game developed and published by Namco.

== Gameplay ==
The player shooting ghosts with the crosshair.

Golly! Ghost! is a light gun shooter video game. Its plot involves a group of scientists inventing an energy weapon named the "Zapper" to defeat a band of comical ghosts, who have taken over an abandoned Victorian era mansion in the Northeastern United States. Players use the attached light guns, nicknamed "Zip" and "Zap", to shoot these ghosts in each of the game's levels, referred to in-game as "scenes". In these scenes, players are to score a specified number of points before the timer runs out. Each scene contains a bonus ghost that awards extra points when shot. These take the form of everyday objects, such as jackets, hamburgers, and footballs. There are a total of four scenes, which conclude in a boss fight; defeating the boss causes them to burst into other smaller ghosts that can be shot for additional points. The game is also a redemption game, in which tickets are awarded based on how well the player performs.

== Development and release ==
Golly! Ghost! uses an electro-mechanical diorama of a house for its background, with movable parts powered by solenoids. These parts, which include a closet door, a chest, and a toilet seat, open and close based on the movements of the ghosts in the game. A mirror inside the machine reflects the game's graphics onto the background, creating the illusion that the characters are interacting directly with the diorama.

Golly! Ghost! was released in Japan in July 1991, running on the Namco System 2 arcade system board. In North America, it was demonstrated at that year's Amusement Machine Operator's Union (AMOU) tradeshow held in Las Vegas, presented alongside the 3D rail shooter Starblade. The game was released in Australia in October.

== Reception and legacy ==
Golly! Ghost! was a commercial success in Japan, being a major contributor towards a 93.9% increase in revenue in Namco's arcade game division during the year. Game Machine commented on its creepy atmosphere and unique concept, believing that its electro-mechanical backdrop would make it stand out from other light gun shooters in arcades. A writer for MegaZone shared his appreciation towards the game for keeping in line with Namco's line of high-quality light gun shooters. They were impressed with the game's mechanical diorama, commenting that "real targets pop up at you, which you must try to hit with your super responsive electro-gun... this looks like a game to try now!". In a 2016 retrospective, Hardcore Gaming 101 writer Aaron Vark felt that Golly! Ghost! was "held back" due to it being a ticket redemption game and not a dedicated light gun shooter. He was critical of the game's high difficulty for forcing players to shoot every ghost in some levels, and for its short length, but Vark commended the graphics and synthesizer music, and found its electro-mechanical background technologically impressive.

A sequel, Bubble Trouble: Golly! Ghost! 2 (Note: Japanese: バブルトラブル: ゴーリー! ゴースト! 2, Hepburn: Baburu Toraburu: Gorī! Gōsuto! Tsu), was released exclusively for Japanese arcades in August 1992. Its gameplay is similar to its predecessor, instead being themed around sunken treasure. Players use the light guns to shoot at fish, crabs, seahorses, and other aquatic creatures at the bottom of the ocean. The four ghosts from the first game return as bonus enemies that can be shot for additional points. Bubble Trouble makes usage of sprite-scaling effects to make enemies fly towards the player. Aaron Vark appreciated the game's wackier tone and more forgiving difficulty, feeling it was a well-suited follow-up. A puzzle game spin-off titled Golly! Ghosts! Goal was released in March 1996 for Windows 95, being a reskin of the game Color Lines with Golly! Ghost! characters.

In 2012, Golly! Ghost! was adapted into a webcomic by ShiftyLook, a division of Namco Bandai Games that focused on reviving older Namco franchises. The comic was illustrated by Chris Eliopoulos, who also worked on Marvel's Franklin Richards: Son of a Genius. Its plot involved the blue ghost moving into the mansion and trying to win the respect of the other ghosts through outlandish challenges and pranks. Alongside the other ShiftyLook comics, it was taken down in September 2014 after the company ceased operations.
