= Mechanized Attack =

1989 video game

- Arcade flyer art
- Developer: SNK
- Publisher: SNK
- Director: Hamachi Papa
- Producers: Eikichi Kawasaki; Tara-Chan (NES)
- Designer: Tara-Chan (NES)
- Programmers: Mr. SNK, Komedar Rom; Kyora Yumi (NES)
- Artists: S. Kiyoshi, M. Itoh, Ken; Miki T., N. Mihara, Kachumi, Kiku‑Bee (NES)
- Composers: Toshikazu Tanaka, Kikuko Hataya; S. Okada, Hinja-kun (NES)
- Platforms: Arcade, Nintendo Entertainment System
- Release: Arcade version: NA: 1989; NES version: NA: June 1990
- Genre: Rail shooter
- Mode: Single-player

Mechanized Attack (メカナイズド・アタック, Mekanaizudo Atakku) is a shooter game developed and published by SNK. It was released in North America for the arcade in 1989, and it was ported to the Nintendo Entertainment System in 1990. It can be played with either the NES controller or the NES Zapper light gun.

== Easter egg ==
On the System Construction Screen in the NES version, the player can cause a female figure to undress herself by certain inputs. The player can continue to make certain inputs following the undressing of the female figure, but it also will show a hexagram which will cause the game to freeze up.

== Reception ==
Reception

Review score
Publication	Score
Electronic Gaming Monthly	5/10, 6/10, 5/10, 6/10 (NES)
