= Space Gun (video game) =

1990 first-person shooter arcade game

- Arcade flyer showing the arcade cabinet with foot pedals and artwork depicting a fight between a human and an alien
- Developer: Taito
- Publisher: Taito
- Producers: Yuji Iwasaki; Atsushi Taniguchi
- Programmers: Yuji Iwasaki; Shinji Soyano; Tatsuo Nakamura; Hikaru Taniguchi
- Artists: Tsutomu Sekimoto; Hideyuki Kato; Atsushi Taniguchi; Yukio Abe; V.A.P; Peacock
- Composer: Norihiro Furukawa
- Platforms: Arcade, Amiga, Atari ST, Commodore 64, MS-DOS, Master System, ZX Spectrum
- Release: WW: October 1990
- Genre: Light gun shooter
- Modes: Single-player, multiplayer
- Arcade system: Taito Z System

Space Gun (Note: Japanese: スペースガン, Hepburn: Supēsu Gan) is a 1990 first-person shooter arcade video game released by Taito. The game is set aboard a crippled space station that has been overrun by hostile alien creatures. The objective is to rescue human crew members while destroying the alien creatures. The game lets the player shoot limbs off the creatures, resulting in blood splatters.

In 1992 home ports were released for the Amiga, Atari ST, Commodore 64, MS-DOS, ZX Spectrum, and Master System. It is one of the few games for the Atari ST and Amiga to support a light gun.

== Gameplay ==
The unseen protagonist shoots a green attacking alien. Remaining time and the number of rescued humans is displayed at top of the screen while ammunition and player health are displayed at the bottom (arcade version shown).

Space Gun is an arcade rail shooter in which the player views the on-screen action from a first person perspective. Players use a cabinet-mounted positional gun to target and shoot enemy aliens that have invaded a research vessel and abducted its crew. Enemies are either mechanical guns that descend from above the screen or aliens, several of which can only be defeated by first shooting away their limbs. The player must save human hostages from the creatures. Occasionally, a hostage will mutate into an alien. In addition to the standard rapid-fire weapon, there are four other weapons: a flamethrower, grenade launcher, freeze bomb, and blade bomb. These weapons require ammunition which can be collected throughout the stages, and are activated by the player using the pump action of the mounted gun. The arcade cabinet features foot pedals (visible in a picture) that, when pressed, reverse the player's direction. This is an essential feature, as it gives the player more time to fire upon an incoming enemy, to help keep the number of enemies at a more manageable level and thereby keep them from being overwhelmed. It also adds an element of strategy to the game, as over-use of the "backpedal" runs the risk of running out of time on the level.

There are six or seven levels (depending on which version of the game is being played) that are split into four subsections, each with its own end-of-level boss. Between levels the story is explained and moved forward through the use of short animated cut-scenes with text on the screen. Players can often choose their own path through the level by selecting a door or arrow using the gun. Several of the home system versions feature light gun support, but all of them allow the player to move a crosshair to target enemies. The multiplayer game is identical to the single-player experience, but the Master System, Commodore 64, and ZX Spectrum versions do not include multiplayer.

== Development and release ==
The arcade game uses raster graphics on a CRT monitor displaying 4096 colors and amplified stereophonic sound. The visuals are reflected into view via a mirror in the cabinet. The arcade cabinet is upright, with the marquee bearing the game's name protruding outward. There are large, blue plastic molds around the cabinet designed to resemble an alien cocoon. The music for Space Gun was composed by Norihiro Furukawa and Naoto Yagishita of Zuntata, Taito's music division. The arcade version of Space Gun was exhibited at the UK Amusement Trades Exhibition International in 1991.

In 1992, Ocean Software released ports for the Amiga, Atari ST, Commodore 64 and ZX Spectrum. The Amiga and Atari ST versions are one of the few games to use the Trojan Light Gun. In developing the Amiga conversion, the team video taped the arcade machine in operation as a reference for the graphics, pausing the video at relevant spots to take notes before recreating them.

A soundtrack CD (a split release with the soundtrack for the Taito game Liquid Kids) was released by Pony Canyon and Scitron on January 21, 1991. This album was also released as part of Taito 1500 Collector's Box on September 17, 1993. A track from the game is on the limited edition CD Zuntata History L'ab-normal 1st, released by Zuntata/Taito on April 1, 1999.

In 2005, Space Gun was included in the compilation title Taito Legends for the PlayStation 2, Microsoft Windows and Xbox.

== Reception ==
Reception

Review scores
| Publication | Score | |
| Publication | Amiga | Arcade |
|---|---|---|
| ACE | 790/1000 | |
| Amiga Action | 80% | |
| Amiga Format | 69% | |
| Amiga Power | 69% | |
| Famitsu | | 8/10, 7/10, 9/10, 5/10 |
| Zero | 83% | 4/5 |
| CU Amiga | 84% | |
| Mega Zone | 84% | |

Award
| Publication | Award |
|---|---|
| Crash | Crash Smash |

In Japan, Space Gun was the second highest-grossing dedicated arcade game of 1991. It was also a hit in the United States, where weekly coin drop earnings averaged $247 per arcade unit during November and December 1990.

Space Gun was well-received by the video game press. In issue 34 of Zero, Amaya Lopex gave the original arcade version of the game four out of five stars. Jonnie Cook of Sinclair User described the arcade release as enjoyable to those that already liked the genre, but stated he preferred other games. Killer List of Videogames called the cabinet design "quite unique". In March 1992, Gary Whitta of Advanced Computer Entertainment magazine stated that the sections that scroll into the screen are a lot easier to play than the horizontally scrolling sections. The screen can quickly fill up with enemies, which can lead to confusion as to what the player is shooting at, especially when human hostages run across the screen as they can be inadvertently killed. Neil West of Amiga Format commented that the title has a high difficulty level and that power-ups are a necessity to continue playing. The "not perfect" rapid-fire weapon (which needs recharging after prolonged use) contributes to the game's difficulty, as stated by Brian Sharp of Games-X magazine.

Several publications compared the game's plot to that of the 1979 film Alien. Simon Forrester of Your Sinclair jokingly referred to Space Gun as the "unofficial game" of the film. Zero magazine gave particular praise to the sections where humans mutate into aliens as they run towards the player. Your Sinclair reviewer Jon Pillar and Chris Buffa of GameDaily said that Space Gun contains graphic violence, citing the visual effect of entrails and blood splashed against the screen. Steve Merritt of CU Amiga described the sound effects, specifically alien squeals and the pumping heartbeat, as "simple, but effective". British gaming magazine The One reviewed the arcade version of Space Gun in 1991, heavily noting its similarity to Aliens. The One praises Space Gun as "great", and 'especially while playing with a friend'.

On release for home platforms, the game received mixed reviews in the press, ranging from 69% in Amiga Format to 84% in CU Amiga magazine. A preview from Amiga Power described Space Gun as deriving from an "inexplicably popular coin-op, best described as Line of Fire set in space". Several reviews have stated that Space Gun is an Operation Wolf clone, while it has also been compared unfavorably to Operation Thunderbolt. Sega Power magazine reviewed the Master System version, giving the game a score of 70% if the player is using a Light Phaser, but only 50% if a control pad is being used. Paul Presley of The One for Amiga Games also found that using input devices other than the guns mounted to the arcade machine "just isn't the same". Prior to the release for the Xbox and PS2 as part of Taito Legends the game was regarded by Gamedaily as being in the "top five" of the games in the collection, and on release the same website described it as "thoroughly enjoyable".
