= Sega Hard Girls =

Japanese multimedia project

- Promotion image for the Hi-sCoool! SeHa Girls anime series featuring Mega Drive (left), Dreamcast (center), and Sega Saturn (right) in both humanoid and chibi forms.

セガ・ハード・ガールズ (Sega Hādo Gāruzu)
- Genre: Fantasy
- Light novel

Gendai Nihon ni Yatte Kita Sega no Megami ni Arigachi na Koto
- Written by: Tōru Shiwasu
- Illustrated by: Kei Garō
- Published by: ASCII Media Works
- Magazine: Dengeki Bunko Magazine
- Original run: June 10, 2013 – June 10, 2014
- Volumes: 2
- Anime television series

Hi-sCoool! SeHa Girls
- Directed by: Sōta Sugawara
- Produced by: Masahiro Nakayama; Toshiyuki Takatatsu
- Written by: Masayuki Kibe; Sōta Sugawara
- Music by: Kengo Tokusashi
- Studio: TMS Entertainment; Genies
- Licensed by: NA: Discotek Media
- Original network: Animax, Tokyo MX, Tochigi TV
- Original run: October 8, 2014 – December 24, 2014
- Episodes: 13
- icon

Sega Hard Girls (Note: Japanese: セガ・ハード・ガールズ, Hepburn: Sega Hādo Gāruzu) is a Japanese multimedia project produced as a collaboration between ASCII Media Works' Dengeki Bunko imprint and video game company Sega. The project re-imagines various Sega video game consoles as anthropomorphized girls in modern Japan.

The project has inspired a light novel series written by Tōru Shiwasu with illustrations by Kei Garō, which was serialized in ASCII Media Works' Dengeki Bunko Magazine between 2013 and 2014, and an anime television series adaptation titled Hi-sCoool! SeHa Girls (Note: Japanese: Hi☆sCoool! セハガール, Hepburn: Hai Sukūru SeHa Gāru) by TMS Entertainment, which aired in Japan between October and December 2014. The characters also made appearances in several video games, including Superdimension Neptune VS Sega Hard Girls, a crossover video game with Idea Factory's Hyperdimension Neptunia franchise.

== Premise ==
The project focuses on various anthropomorphized Sega consoles, known as "Sega Hard Girls" or "SeHa Girls" for short, each with their own unique personality. The anime series follows three such girls; Dreamcast, Sega Saturn, and Mega Drive, who must graduate from Sehagaga Academy, a special school located in Haneda, Tokyo (the real-life location of Sega's corporate offices), by venturing into the worlds of various Sega games and earning medals. The light novels instead depict the girls as goddesses who come to live with the book's protagonist, high school student Isao Sugawara, and purify other goddesses who have been cursed to become vengeful spirits.

== Characters ==
Dreamcast (ドリームキャスト, Dorīmukyasuto)
Voiced by: Mao Ichimichi (Japanese); Mela Lee (English)
A pink-haired cheerful girl who wants to make friends with everyone and to excel in school. She wears a white and orange dress with a Dreamcast controller as her headgear, and can also access the internet using a dial-up modem. In the light novel, she goes by the alias "Yumemi Segamori".
Sega Saturn (セガサターン, Sega Satān)
Voiced by: Minami Takahashi (Japanese); Lauren Landa (English)
A black-haired serious girl seeking to accomplish great things in life who is the object of several male Sega characters' affections. She wears a silver coat with black dress and a huge black ring hanging on her neck. In the light novel, she goes by the alias "Hotaru Segamori".
Mega Drive (メガドライブ, Mega Doraibu)
Voiced by: Shiori Izawa (Japanese); Faye Mata (English)
A blonde-haired cool and genius girl who knows everything, holding a wealth of knowledge in her 16-bit encyclopedia. She wears black and pink attire, large eyeglasses, and has a Mega Drive controller as her hairclip. In the light novel, she goes by the alias "Mayo Kudo".
Sega Mark III (セガ・マークIII, Sega Māku Surī)
Voiced by: Manami Tanaka
An upbeat girl who wears bunny ears and likes to perform magic tricks.
Master System (マスターシステム, Masutā Shisutemu)
Voiced by: Yūko Takayama
A silver haired girl who has a Master System controller on her sleeve. She is a talented musician and has many fans in Brazil.
Game Gear (ゲームギア, Gēmu Gia)
Voiced by: Minami Tanaka
A moody negative girl with multicolored hair. She tires easily and prefers to stay indoors, often leaving class early to watch television.
Robo Pitcher (ロボピッチャ, Robo Piccha)
Voiced by: Haruna Momono
A small sports enthusiast who dislikes being treated as a child. Her personality changes based on whether she is playing baseball or tennis.
Visual Memory (ビジュアルメモリ, Bijuaru Memori)
Voiced by: Sumire Uesaka
A blue-haired fairy-like girl who loves to talk and can shrink herself down at will.
SC-3000 (エスジー・サンゼン, Esujī Sanzen)
Voiced by: Mai Aizawa
A fighting instructor with a stubborn personality who wields a naginata. In the light novel, she goes by the alias "Sachie Sanzenin".
SG-1000 (エスジー・セン, Esujī Sen)
Voiced by: Yū Serizawa
A timid crybaby who carries a giant controller on her back.
SG-1000 II (エスジー・センII, Esujī Sen Tsū)
Voiced by: Naomi Ōzora
A white-haired girl who can float and has psychic powers, but whose mood is difficult to read.
Mega-CD (メガCD, Mega-Shī Dī)
Voiced by: Shiori Mikami
A royal knight armed with sword and shield. She cares for animals and children, but is naive and easily fooled.
Mega Drive 2 (メガドライブ2, Mega Doraibu Tsū)
Voiced by: Yuri Yamaoka
Mega Drive's little sister, who tries to act more mature than she actually is.
Mega CD 2 (メガCD2, Mega-Shī Dī Tsū)
Voiced by: Saori Hayashi
A sporty and impulsive girl who rides around on a hoverboard.
Super 32X (スーパー32X, Sūpā Sātī Tsu Ekkusu)
Voiced by: Yui Kano
A fairy-like girl who likes to tease others. In the light novel, she goes by the alias "Kyoka Kanzaki".
Genesis (ジェネシス, Jeneshisu)
Voiced by: Asami Tano
A self-obsessed American cowgirl. She prefers the nickname "Jenny". In the light novel, she goes by the alias "Jenny Amachi".
TeraDrive (テラドライブ, TeraDoraibu)
Voiced by: Marina Inoue
An intelligent and graceful girl who loves to read and sometimes talks to herself.

=== Other characters ===
Center-sensei (センター先生, Sentā-sensei)
Voiced by: Yuji Naka
A teacher at Sehagaga Academy, featured in the anime series. He issues lessons to his students via a monitor, with his avatar being based on Professor Asobin, a rabbit mascot character that appeared in several early Sega game manuals. His true identity, revealed in the final episode, is that of former Sega game designer and programmer Yuji Naka.
Isao Sugawara (菅原勇雄, Sugawara Isao)
The protagonist of the light novel series. He is a teenager living in Haneda with his younger sister Yui, and is set to one day become head of the Anamori Inari Shrine. While initially cynical and skeptical of the supernatural, his interactions with the Sega Hard Girls gradually restore his original optimistic personality.
Hatsumi Sega (瀬賀初美, Sega Hatsumi)
Voiced by: Emi Nitta (Japanese); Cassandra Lee Morris (English)
The protagonist of Superdimension Neptune VS Sega Hard Girls. Initially amnesiac and going by the nickname "Segami", she is eventually revealed to be a goddess embodying Sega as a whole.

== Media ==
=== Light novels ===
A light novel series, titled Gendai Nihon ni Yatte Kita Sega no Megami ni Arigachi na Koto, (Note: 現代日本にやってきたセガの女神にありがちなこと, Sega Goddesses Tend to Appear in Modern Japan) was written by Tōru Shiwasu, with illustrations by Hatsune Miku artist Kei Garō. It began serialization in ASCII Media Works' Dengeki Bunko Magazine on June 10, 2013. ASCII Media Works published the first volume on December 10, 2013, under Dengeki Bunko imprint while the second volume followed on June 10, 2014.

=== Anime ===
An anime adaptation titled Hi-sCoool! SeHa Girls, which was produced by TMS Entertainment using the MikuMikuDance animation software, aired in Japan between October 8 and December 24, 2014, on Animax and was simulcast by Crunchyroll. The series was directed by Sōta Sugawara, who also co-wrote the anime's screenplay with Masayuki Kibe. The CG character designs used in the anime were co-designed by Sugawara and Kio, who based the designs on Kei Garō's original concepts. Shigeyuki Watanabe handled the CG direction. The opening theme is "Sehagaga Ganbacchau!!" (Note: セハガガがんばっちゃう!!) sung by Dreamcast (Mao Ichimichi), Sega Saturn (Minami Takahashi) and Mega Drive (Shiori Izawa). The ending theme is, "Wakai Chikara (Sega Hard Girls Mix)" (Note: 若い力-SEGA HARD GIRLS MIX-) based on the Sega company song "Wakai Chikara", sung by SC-3000 (Mai Aizawa), SG-1000 (Yū Serizawa), SG-1000 II (Naomi Ōzora), Game Gear (Minami Tanaka) and Robo Pitcher (Haruna Momono).

An additional OVA was released as part of the DVD box set on November 3, 2016. The Japanese DVDs included download codes for the show's character models for use in MikuMikuDance. The anime was licensed in North America by Discotek Media, and was released via a Blu-ray and DVD combo pack on May 30, 2017; the OVA is not included in the North American release.

==== Episode list ====
List of Hi-sCoool! SeHa Girls episodes
No.	Title	Original release date
1	"It'll Always Be 10 Years Too Early for You!"; Transliteration: "Itsudatte Jū-nen Hayain da yo!" (Japanese: いつだって10年早いんだよ！)	October 8, 2014
Dreamcast, Sega Saturn, and Mega Drive become acquainted with each other, discussing what kind of guys Saturn might like. As the classes begins, their teacher, an 8-bit rabbit named Center, explains that in order to graduate from the academy, they must earn 100 medals. For their first lesson, Center sends the girls into the world of Virtua Fighter, where they are confronted by Akira Yuki.
2	"Connect Your Passions into a Combo"; Transliteration: "Konbo de Tsunage Atsui Kimochi" (Japanese: コンボでつなげ 熱い気持ち)	October 15, 2014
Tasked with winning 100 matches in order to clear the lesson and earn medals, the girls use each of their abilities to beat Akira. As the matches continue, with opponents ranging from giant Mushiking beetles to palette swaps of Golden Axe enemies, it becomes apparent that Dreamcast's flying headbutt attack can instantly defeat them. Their final opponent is Sakura Shinguji from Sakura Wars, who defeats Mega Drive, but Dreamcast once again defeats her with a headbutt. After the lesson, only Saturn receives medals, as Mega Drive was eliminated and Dreamcast was disqualified for attacking before the "Fight!" announcement in an earlier battle.
3	"Up, Down, Left, Right, and Occasionally, Up Diagonal"; Transliteration: "Appu, Daun, Refuto, Raito, Tama ni Naname Ue" (Japanese: アップ、ダウン、レフト、ライト、たまにナナメ上)	October 22, 2014
After Saturn contemplates her future career and love life and Mega Drive tries her hand at weather forecasting, the girls are tasked with entering the world of Space Channel 5, where they must help improve the channel's ratings and retrieve two of Center's friends. While learning their dancing moves, the girls soon meet up with the game's heroine, Ulala.
4	"We Tried to Dance Space Channel 5"; Transliteration: "(Sega Gāru) Supēsu Channeru Faibu (Odottemita)" (Japanese: 【セハガール】スペースチャンネル5【踊ってみた】)	October 29, 2014
While helping Ulala with fighting against the Morolians, the girls notice the ratings gradually decreasing. The girls attempt to raise their ratings by rescuing Center's friend, Jeffry McWild from Virtua Fighter, putting Saturn in a swimsuit for added sex appeal, and getting the cooperation of Center's other friend, Golden Axe's Gilius Thunderhead, who exhibits a dubious affection towards Saturn. They soon end up facing the Morolian Boss, which is defeated by Saturn. At the end of the day, Mega Drive and Dreamcast win five medals apiece, whilst Saturn wins none after the Space PTA complains about her attempts to use sex appeal.
5	"Puyo + Puyo + Puyo + Puyo = 0"; Transliteration: "Puyo purasu Puyo purasu Puyo purasu Puyo wa Zero" (Japanese: ぷよ+ぷよ+ぷよ+ぷよ = 0)	November 5, 2014
The girls try to find Saturn an ideal pet, though all of their suggestions involve Saturn having to move to America. Afterwards, Center tasks the girls with coming up with new game ideas that incorporate Puyo Puyo, with medals awarded and deducted based on the quality of their ideas. Mega Drive and Dreamcast earn medals for just reskinning existing games like Fantasy Zone and Roommania #203 with added Puyos, while Saturn's ideas end up costing her medals. Saturn eventually earns a medal for her idea of a Puyo Puyo Waterslide, which the girls get to try out for themselves.
6	"Center-sensei's Center Exam"; Transliteration: "Sentā-sensei no Sentā Shiken" (Japanese: センター先生のセンター試験)	November 12, 2014
Center hosts an exam in which the girls enter the world of the Border Break robot shooter game, where they can win a large number of medals. Saturn, the only one who has to go on foot, is made into a decoy for the enemy, while Dreamcast struggles with her controls, leaving Mega Drive to take on most of the enemies. Just as the girls reach the enemy core, the game world is hacked by Doctor Eggman, who shrinks the girls and starts wreaking havoc until Sonic the Hedgehog appears.
7	"Eggman vs. Sonic with the Sega Hard Girls"; Transliteration: "Egguman vs Sonikku with Sega Hādo Gāruzu" (Japanese: エッグマンvsソニック with セガ・ハード・ガールズ)	November 19, 2014
The girls team up with Sonic to chase after Eggman through various dimensional warp zones, briefly passing through Sonic the Hedgehog and Sonic Adventure. Upon returning to Border Break, the girls manage to retrieve Mega Drive's encyclopedia and give Sonic an invincibility power-up to defeat Eggman, destroying the enemy core and passing the exam in the process. The girls leave the game and, after nearly having Center's true identity revealed, each receives medals.
8	"Shine! The 54th! Shock to the Brain! No Spillage, But We'll Destroy the Barriers of Spillage-obsessed Youth! Sehagaga Academy Culture Festival!"; Transliteration: "Kagayake! Dai Jū-go-yon Kai! Nōten Chokugeki! Porori wa Nai kedo Porori Seishun Genkai no Baria o Uchiyabure! Sehagaga Gakuen Bunkasai!" (Japanese: 輝け！ 第54 回！ 脳天直撃！ ポロリはないけど、ポロリ青春 限界のバリアを打ち破れ！ セハガガ学園文化祭！)	November 26, 2014
With the academy's dubiously named culture festival arriving, the girls try to come up with an exhibit to show before taking a look at their competition for a beauty contest. In the end, the girls lose the competition to Bongo from Congo Bongo due to her exposed chest.
9	"Weapon Enhancement Succeeds at a 50% Rate, but It Sure Feels Like 15% to Me"; Transliteration: "Buki Kyōka no Seikōritsu Go-jū%, Taikan de wa Jū-go% Setsu" (Japanese: 武器強化の成功率50%、体感では15%説)	December 3, 2014
The girls are sent into the world of the smartphone RPG Chain Chronicle, despite Mega Drive's dislike of smartphone gaming. They earn medals fighting against various monsters, but have trouble recruiting other warriors to assist them. In the end, Mega Drive barely defeats the boss monster, but the phone runs out of power before they can claim the additional medals.
10	"Broken Jet Set Radio"; Transliteration: "Kowarekake no Jetto Setto Rajio" (Japanese: 壊れかけのジェットセットラジオ)	December 10, 2014
With their next lesson taking place in the world of Jet Set Radio, the girls give Mega Drive her first sticker photo booth experience before working towards performing an awesome skate trick and having a race to reach the goal first.
11	"Dream Rappy, Saturn Rappy, Mega Rappy, ?? Rappy"; Transliteration: "Dori Rappī, Sata Rappī, Mega Rappī, ?? Rappī" (Japanese: ドリラッピー、サタラッピー、メガラッピー、??ラッピー)	December 17, 2014
The girls' next lesson has them enter the world of Shining Force Cross Exlesia Zenith dressed up as Rappies from Phantasy Star Online 2. The three struggle against a large dragon boss, which is ultimately defeated by a real Rappy.
12	"I Heard We're Graduating Sehaga"; Transliteration: "Sehaga, Sotsugyōsurun datte yo" (Japanese: セハガ、卒業するんだってよ)	December 24, 2014
A black rabbit named Black Asobin takes over Sehagaga's network and steals the girls' medals, challenging them to enter his world and retrieve them. After battling through Black Asobin's tower, Saturn, the only girl with a medal remaining, enters the world of Space Harrier and defeats Black Asobin, who is revealed to have been Center all along. For clearing the 'graduation exam', the girls each gain medals, giving Dreamcast and Mega Drive more than enough medals to graduate. Saturn, being three short, is nearly held back, but Dreamcast and Mega Drive share their spare medals so she can graduate alongside them.
13	"We'll Always Be Connected!"; Transliteration: "Itsudatte, Tsunagatte masukara!" (Japanese: いつだって、つながってますから！)	December 24, 2014
Attending the graduation ceremony, the girls reminisce on their adventures. Center informs them what graduation means: The three of them will disappear from the world, which exists from the ideas of Sega's game creators, and be reborn as Sega hardware consoles in the real world to bring those ideas to life. Mega Drive and Saturn share their goodbyes before entering the real world in their respective time periods, while Dreamcast is encouraged by all of the game characters they encountered before heading off herself. In the real world, a father introduces his young son to the Sega Dreamcast for the first time.
OVA	"The Excessive 54th Annual! Go Give It All You've Got! Only You Can Be the Champion! Surpass All the School Events of the Past! Sehagaga Academy Sports Festival"; Transliteration: "Dai Go-jū-yon Kai Hanpa Ja Nō! Zenryoku de Gū~ Yūshō Suru no wa Onrī Yū! Subete no Gakkō Gyōji o Kako ni Suru! Sehagaga Gakuen Taiikusai" (Japanese: 第54回 ハンパじゃノー！全力でグー！優勝するのはオンリーユー！すべての学校行事を過去にする！セハガガ学園体育祭)	November 3, 2016
The girls are joined by Master System, Mark III, Mega Drive 2 and Robo Pitcher as they all participate in the school sports festival. The seven compete in a multi-stage Hang-On race that passes through all the games from their past lessons, aided along the way by the various characters they have met. As they compete, a pair of Hi-Saturn and V-Saturn consoles provide frequent commentary. Though the girls are nearly tied as they approach the goal, they are all defeated in a photo finish by the Hercules Ricky Blue beetle from Mushiking.

=== Manga ===
An anthology manga series, Chikiu Boueitai! SeHa Girl, (Note: ちきう☆防衛隊！ セハガール, Chikiu Defense Force! SeHa Girl) featured stories written and drawn by multiple creators. The series was serialized in Dengeki Maoh magazine in 2014, and was later compiled in a single tankōbon volume in February 2015.

=== Video games ===
The Sega Hard Girls version of Dreamcast makes a cameo appearance in Dengeki Bunko: Fighting Climax; the game's updated release, Dengeki Bunko: Fighting Climax Ignition, adds an additional stage based on Hi-sCoool! SeHa Girls.

A crossover game with Compile Heart's Hyperdimension Neptunia series, titled Superdimension Neptune VS Sega Hard Girls, (Note: 超次元大戦 ネプテューヌVSセガハードガールズ 夢の合体スペシャル, Hyperdimensional War: Neptune's Platoon vs. Sega Hard Girls: Dream Combination Special) was released for PlayStation Vita in Japan on November 26, 2015 and later on released in North America on October 18, 2016 as well as Europe on October 21, 2016. A high-definition port of the game for Windows was released on June 12, 2017, via Steam.

Other games have featured the characters during limited time events, such as Kaden Shoujo and Super Robot Wars X-Ω. A 2013 crossover event in Sega's Samurai & Dragons game for PlayStation Vita featured additional Sega Hard Girls based on Sega arcade boards. These characters were originally planned to appear as part of the main franchise, but were excluded due to concerns of them being too niche and the project already featuring too many characters.

=== Online radio show ===
An online radio show, SeHa Girls' Hardcore Sega Info Radio, (Note: セハガールのハードなSEGA情報RADIO, Sehagāru no Hādona Sega Jōhō Radio) known as SeHaRadi (セハラジ) for short, featured the voice actresses of the franchise providing updates on Sega Hard Girls media and merchandise, commenting on Sega related news, and answering listener questions. The series premiered on October 12, 2014, on Nippon Cultural Broadcasting's Super! A&G+ digital radio station, and aired for 195 episodes, concluding on July 1, 2018.
