= Outtrigger =

Outtrigger may refer to:

- Outtrigger (video game), a 1999 video game
- Outtrigger (band), a Swedish metal band

== See also ==
- Outrigger
