= Ghost Squad =

Ghost Squad may refer to:

- Ghost Squad (TV series), a 1961 TV series produced by ITC Entertainment
- Ghost Squad (video game), a 2004 light gun rail shooter arcade game developed and published by Sega
- Ghost Squad Evolution (arcade game), the 2007 arcade follow-up to Ghost Squad
- The Ghost Squad, a 2005 TV series produced by "Company Pictures", for Channel 4
