= List of arcade video games: Q =

This is a list of arcade video games organized alphabetically by name. It does not include PC or console games unless they were also released in video arcades. See Lists of video games for related lists.

Title	Alternate Title(s)	Year	Manufacturer	Genre(s)	Max. Players	PCB Model
Q*bert	—	1982	Gottlieb	Action	2	
Q*bert's Qubes	—	1983	Mylstar	Action	2	
Qix	—	1981	Taito	Action	2	
Qix II: Tournament	—	1982	Taito	Action	2	
Quadro Quiz II	—	1985	Status Games	Quiz game		
Quantum	—	1982	Atari	Action	2	
Quarterback	—	1987	Leland	Sports	2	
Quartet	—	1986	Sega	Scrolling shooter	4	
Quartet 2	—	1986	Sega	Scrolling shooter	2	
Quasar	—	1980	Zaccaria	Multidirectional shooter	2	
Que Long Gao Shou	—	1999	IGS	Mahjong video game		
Queen	—	199?	STG			
Quest of D	—	2004	Sega			
Quest of D ver. 2.0	—	2005	Sega			
Quest of D ver. 3.0	—	2006	Sega			
Quest of D: The Battle Kingdom	—	2007	Sega			
Quester	—	1987	Namco	Breakout	2	
Quester Special Edition	—	1987	Namco	Breakout	2	
Quiz	—	1986	Elettronolo	Quiz game		
Quiz & Dragons: Capcom Quiz Game	—	1992	Capcom	Quiz game		CPS1
Quiz & Variety Sukusuku Inufuku	—	1998	Video System	Quiz game		
Quiz & Variety Sukusuku Inufuku 2	—	2004	Video System	Quiz game		
Quiz 365: Mainichi Kawaru Quiz Bangumi	—	1994	Nakanihon Wreath	Quiz game		
Quiz Ah Megamisama	—	2000	Sega	Quiz game		NAOMI cart.
Quiz Bishoujo Senshi Sailormoon: Chiryoku Tairyoku Toki no Un	—	1997	Banpresto	Quiz game		
Quiz Channel Question	—	1993	Nakanihon	Quiz game		
Quiz Chikyuu Bouei-gun	—	1992	Taito	Quiz game		
Quiz Crayon Shin-chan	—	1993	Taito	Quiz game		
Quiz Daisousasen: The Last Count Down	—	1991	SNK		2	NeoGeo
Quiz de Idol! Hot Debut	—	2000	Psikyo	Quiz game		
Quiz DNA no Hanran	—	1992	Face	Quiz game		
Quiz Do Re Mi Fa Grand Prix	—	1994	Konami	Quiz game		
Quiz Do Re Mi Fa Grand Prix 2: Shin-Kyoku Nyuukadayo	—	1995	Konami	Quiz game		
Quiz F-1 1,2 finish	—	1992	Irem	Quiz game		
Quiz Gakuen Paradise	—	1991	NMK	Quiz game		
Quiz Gakumon no Susume	—	1993	Konami	Quiz game		
Quiz Gekiretsu Scramble: Gakuen Paradise 2	—	1992	Face	Quiz game		
Quiz Ghost Hunter: The Quiz Adventure	—	1994	Sega	Quiz game		
Quiz H.Q.	—	1990	Taito	Quiz game		
Quiz Jinsei Gekijoh	—	1993	Taito	Quiz game		
Quiz Keitai Q mode	—	2002	Amadio	Quiz game		NAOMI GD-ROM
Quiz King of Fighters	—	1995	Saurus	Quiz game	2	NeoGeo
Quiz Kokology	—	1992	Tecmo	Quiz game		
Quiz Kokology 2: Quiz & Shinri Game	—	1993	Tecmo	Quiz game		
Quiz Meintantei Neo & Geo: Quiz Daisousasen Part 2	—	1992	SNK	Quiz game	2	NeoGeo
Quiz Mekurumeku Story	—	1992	Sega	Quiz game		
Quiz Mobile Suit Gundam: Tou. Senshi	—	2006	Capcom	Quiz game		
Quiz Nanairo Dreams: Nijiiro-chō no Kiseki	—	1996	Capcom	Quiz game	2	CPS2
Quiz Olympic	—	1985	Seoul Coin	Quiz game		
Quiz Panicuru Fantasy	—	1993	NMK	Quiz game		
Quiz Punch	—	1988	Space Computer	Quiz game		
Quiz Punch 2	—	1989	Space Computer	Quiz game		
Quiz Quest: Hime to Yuusha no Monogatari	—	1991	Taito	Quiz game		
Quiz Rouka ni Tattenasai	—	1991	Sega	Quiz game		
Quiz Sangokushi: Chiryaku no Hasha	—	1991	Capcom	Quiz game		
Quiz Sekai wa SHOW by Shobai	—	1994	Taito	Quiz game		
Quiz Show	—	1976	Atari	Quiz game	2	
Quiz Theater: 3tsu no Monogatari	—	1994	Taito	Quiz game		
Quiz Tonosama no Yabou	—	1991	Capcom	Quiz game		
Quiz Tonosama no Yabou 2: Zenkoku-ban	—	1995	Capcom	Quiz game		
Quiz Torimonochou	—	1990	Taito	Quiz game		
Quiz-Mahjong Hayaku Yatteyo!	—	1990	Nichibutsu	Quiz game		
Quizard	—	1995	TAB Austria	Quiz game		
Quizard 3	—	1996	TAB Austria	Quiz game		
Quizard Fun and Fascination	—	1996	TAB Austria	Quiz game		
Quizard Rainbow	—	1997	TAB Austria	Quiz game		
Quizmaster	—	1985	Coinmaster	Quiz game		
Quizvaders	—	1991	Bell-Fruit	Quiz game		
Qwak!	—	1974	Atari			
