= R-Tuned: Ultimate Street Racing =

2008 arcade video game

- Arcade flyer featuring the Mazda RX-7 (FD3S)
- Developer: Sega AM2
- Publisher: Sega
- Platform: Arcade
- Release: NA: 23 October 2008; EU: 17 April 2009
- Genre: Racing
- Modes: Single player, multiplayer
- Arcade system: Sega Lindbergh

R-Tuned: Ultimate Street Racing is an arcade racing game developed by Sega AM2 And released by Sega on 23 October 2008 in Asia and North America, and on 17 April 2009 in Europe. The game focuses on the import scene and illegal street racing. The game runs on the Sega Lindbergh platform, and uses character model engine from Virtua Fighter 5. Players can save their progress and records by using IC cards. There are boost buttons on the steering wheel, players can use unlimited boosts to speed up during the game.

There are 2 modes of the game :

- Battle mode : players try to get highest points during the race
- Time attack : players try to finish the course with the fastest time

== Cities ==
- New York
- Hong Kong
- Shibuya
- Shinjuku

== Cars ==
There are total 20 playable cars and 5 unplayable cars (Total: 25). The cars can be tuned up to higher levels for better performance. Also, comic graphic stickers and neon tubes can be added to the cars.

Playable cars:

- Chevrolet Corvette (C6)
- Ford Mustang
- Honda Integra
- Honda NSX
- Honda S2000
- Mazda RX-7 (FD)
- Mazda RX-8
- Mazda Savanna RX-7 (FC)
- Mitsubishi Eclipse
- Mitsubishi Lancer Evolution IX
- Nissan Fairlady Z (Z32)
- Nissan Fairlady Z (Z33)
- Nissan Skyline GT-R (R32)
- Nissan Skyline GT-R (R34)
- Pontiac GTO
- Subaru Impreza
- Subaru Legacy
- Toyota Celica (ST202)
- Toyota Celica (ZZT231)
- Toyota Supra

Unplayable cars:

- Ford GT
- Dodge Viper
- 1967 Ford Mustang
- Chevrolet Corvette (C3)
- Nissan GT-R
