= The King of Route 66 =

2002 video game

- Developers: Sega AM2 (Arcade); Tose (PS2)
- Publisher: Sega
- Director: Keiichi Matsunami
- Producer: Kazuhiro Goji
- Designers: Junki Kamishima; Kazuo Shiomi
- Programmer: Masami Yamana
- Composer: Tomoya Koga
- Platforms: Arcade, PlayStation 2
- Release: Arcade: JP: February 2002; NA: March 17, 2003; PlayStation 2: NA: March 18, 2003; EU: September 5, 2003
- Genres: Vehicle simulation, action
- Modes: Single-player, multiplayer
- Arcade system: Sega NAOMI 2

The King of Route 66 is an arcade game developed by Sega AM2 and distributed by Sega, released for arcades in 2002-2003, and ported to PlayStation 2 in 2003. It is the sequel to 18 Wheeler: American Pro Trucker.

== Reception ==
Reception

Aggregate score
Aggregator	Score
Metacritic	57/100

Review scores
Publication	Score
AllGame	2.5/5
Electronic Gaming Monthly	6/10
Game Informer	7/10
GamePro	2.5/5
GameSpot	6/10
GameSpy	2/5
GameZone	7.5/10
IGN	6/10
Official U.S. PlayStation Magazine	3/5
X-Play	2/5
Maxim	3/5
The Village Voice	4/10

The PlayStation 2 version received "mixed" reviews according to the review aggregation website Metacritic.
