= F355 Challenge =

1999 video game

- Developer: Sega AM2: Sega AM2 CRI (Dreamcast) Tose (Playstation 2)
- Publishers: Sega; Dreamcast: JP: Sega; WW: Acclaim Entertainment; PlayStation 2: WW: Sega; EU: Sony Computer Entertainment
- Director: Yu Suzuki
- Producer: Yu Suzuki
- Designer: Yoji Kato
- Composer: Tomoya Koga
- Platforms: Arcade, Dreamcast, PlayStation 2
- Release: July 1999: Arcade July 1999 January 2001 (F355 Challenge 2: International Course Edition Arcade); JP: January 2001 Dreamcast; JP: August 3, 2000; NA: September 22, 2000; EU: October 20, 2000 PlayStation 2; JP: September 26, 2002; EU: September 27, 2002; NA: September 28, 2002
- Genre: Racing simulation
- Modes: Single-player, multiplayer
- Arcade system: Sega NAOMI Multiboard

F355 Challenge (Note: Japanese: F355 チャレンジ, Hepburn: F355 Charenji) is a 1999 racing simulation video game developed and published by Sega for arcades. It was developed for the Sega Naomi Multiboard arcade system board and was later ported to the Dreamcast and PlayStation 2 home video game consoles under the names F355 Challenge: Passione Rossa and Ferrari F355 Challenge (Note: Japanese: フェラーリ F355 チャレンジ, Hepburn: Ferāri F355 Charenji) respectively for both American and European releases. The only model of car featured in the game is the Ferrari F355 Challenge model. Unlike Sega's other arcade racers like Out Run titles, F355 Challenge aimed to be realistic. The game was considered the most accurate simulation of the F355 possible up until that time.

Some versions of the arcade cabinet are noteworthy for having three screens, allowing the player to look through the side windows as they would in a real car. The cabinet itself is composed of four NAOMI units: one for each of the three screens and one to sync them all. The game also allows the player to use an automatic transmission or paddle-shift the gears. It also uses a real-time "Magic Weather" system similar to Shenmue.

== Gameplay ==
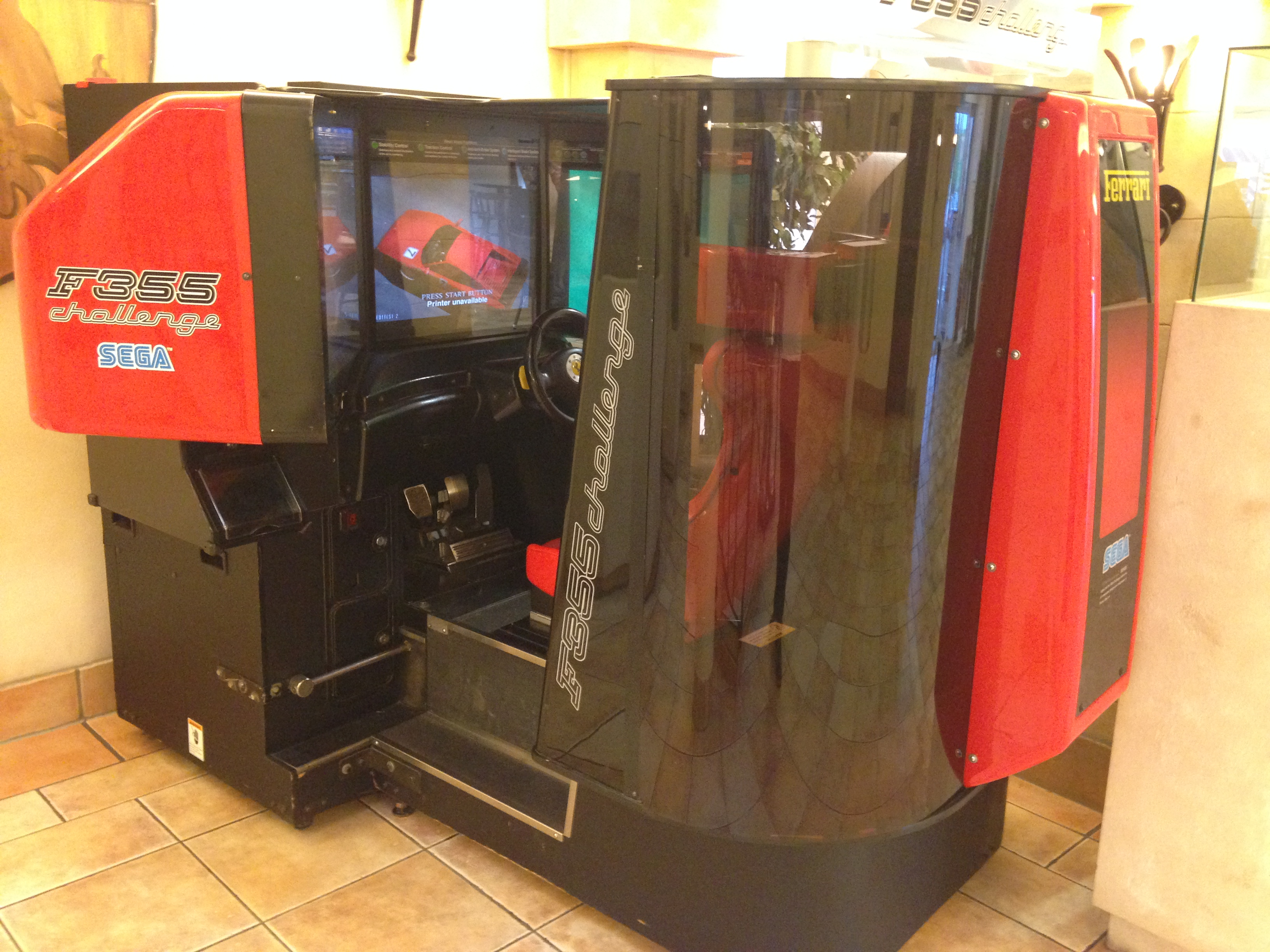
Sega F355 Challenge three screen arcade unit

The game offers training, free-driving and racing modes, with three selectable driving levels that vary the amount of assistance provided to the player. Its assistance systems include stability control (SC), traction control (TC), an anti-lock braking system (ABS) and an intelligent brake system (IBS). Players can also select different transmission settings, ranging from automatic assistance to manual gear changing. At the end of an arcade session, the machine can print a data sheet showing driving performance, including information about braking, acceleration and racing lines.

The 1999 arcade version of the game includes six circuits:

- Motegi (Oval Circuit)
- Suzuka (Short Configuration)
- Monza (1998 configuration)
- Sugo
- Suzuka (Full Configuration)
- Long Beach

In addition, the home console versions of the game include five extra unlockable circuits:

- Atlanta
- Nürburgring
- Laguna Seca
- Sepang
- Fiorano (private track owned by Ferrari)

The five additional circuits can be unlocked by either finishing in certain positions in a certain race or championship, driving over a certain cumulative distance in the game, or by entering a password in a revealable password entry screen. These tracks were also included in the F355 Challenge 2: International Course Edition arcade machine, released in 2001.

The Dreamcast version supports local multiplayer through split-screen and link cable play, alongside online rankings and network races in which players' performances are compared after racing individually. Sega's original online services were discontinued in 2006. Fan developer flyinghead restored the Network Race functionality in December 2023, followed by the game's website, online rankings and ghost-data sharing features in August 2024.

The game's soundtrack features hard rock music during races. In a retrospective review, GameSpot compared its musical style to that of Sammy Hagar and noted that players could disable the music during gameplay.

== Development ==
Yu Suzuki is a keen Ferrari enthusiast who allegedly used data from his own Ferrari 355 at certain tracks to implement in the game during its development.

F355 Challenge was publicly unveiled at a press event on 19 May 1999, ahead of its Japanese arcade release in July. During development, director Yu Suzuki sought to create a driving simulator that would reward the acquisition of real-world racing skills rather than a conventional arcade racing game. He envisioned a game in which players could improve their driving through practice, particularly by learning racing lines, braking points and vehicle control.

In autumn 1997, the development team conducted real-world testing with three Ferrari vehicles at a racing circuit, gathering driving data to help reproduce the cars' handling characteristics. Professional racing drivers Tetsuya Ōta and Naoki Hattori participated in the testing, which examined factors including vehicle speed, cornering and G-forces. Racing driver Kazuo Shimizu also contributed to the game's development as the team refined the simulation of Ferrari handling.

The Dreamcast version was announced at E3 2000. In a July 2000 interview, director Yu Suzuki explained that the Dreamcast version of F355 Challenge was intended to offer more content than the original arcade release. He stated that the developers were incorporating features that had been impractical to include in the arcade version, alongside ideas conceived after its completion. Although Suzuki declined to reveal how many circuits would be available, the completed Dreamcast version included five additional unlockable courses.

For the Dreamcast version, Sega introduced additional racing modes, car customisation and expanded driving analysis features. Players could adjust mechanical settings including suspension, wheel camber and aerodynamic components, while driving telemetry could be saved to the console's Visual Memory Unit for later analysis. The conversion also introduced a championship mode, split-screen multiplayer and network competition, alongside the arcade game's training and racing features.

Outside Japan, the Dreamcast version was published by Acclaim Entertainment rather than Sega. According to the German magazine Sega Magazin, this arrangement resulted from Acclaim holding exclusive licensing rights for Ferrari video games.

== Reception ==
Reception

Aggregate score
Aggregator	Score	
Aggregator	Dreamcast	PS2
Metacritic	85/100	70/100

Review scores
Publication	Score	
Publication	Dreamcast	PS2
CNET Gamecenter	9/10	N/A
Edge	7/10	N/A
Electronic Gaming Monthly	7/10 (Note: Three critics of Electronic Gaming Monthly gave the Dreamcast version each a score of 7.5/10, 7/10, and 6.5/10.)	N/A
Famitsu	29/40	27/40
Game Informer	7.5/10	7/10
GameFan	(J.W.) 92% 80% (Note: In GameFan's viewpoint of the Dreamcast version, three critics gave it each a score of 77, 92, and 71.)	N/A
GameRevolution	B−	N/A
GameSpot	9.1/10	7.5/10
GameSpy	9.5/10	3/5
GameZone	N/A	6/10
IGN	9.2/10	7.8/10
Next Generation	4/5	N/A
Official U.S. PlayStation Magazine	N/A	2/5

Award
Publication	Award
Edge	Coin-op of the Year

Passione Rossa received "generally favorable reviews", while Ferrari F355 Challenge received "average" reviews, according to the review aggregation website Metacritic. Dan Elektro of GamePro's December 2000 issue said of the former, "There will be no in-between when it comes to F355 Challenge – you'll either immerse yourself in truly mastering one of the world's most powerful sports cars, or you'll find this about as much fun as taking your driver's test. If you accept its inherent challenges, F355 will deliver the real deal." (Note: GamePro gave the Dreamcast version 5/5 for graphics, 4/5 for sound, 4.5/5 for control, and 3.5/5 for fun factor.) 23 issues later, Kilo Watt said of the latter, "What the game lacks in the bells and whistles department, it makes up for in its insane depth. Ferrari fans who enjoy strict racing simulations, have a lot of patience, and enjoy using the control pad versus a racing wheel will get the most out of F355 Challenge." (Note: GamePro gave the PlayStation 2 version 4/5 for graphics, 3/5 for sound, and two 3.5/5 scores for control and fun factor.) John Gaudiosi of NextGen praised the former's realistic driving physics, AI, the addition of assist programs for inexperienced players, and graphics, but noted the absence of online multiplayer despite the game featuring two-player option.

In Japan, Famitsu gave it a score of 29 out of 40 for the same console version, and 27 out of 40 for the latter one. Game Machine listed the arcade version in their January 1, 2000 issue as the seventh most-successful dedicated arcade game of the past year in Japan.

European reception was generally positive. British magazine Computer and Video Games awarded F355 Challenge four stars out of five, praising its realism and driving model while noting its demanding nature. French magazine Playmag gave the game 15 out of 20, regarding it as an accomplished racing simulation but emphasising that its difficulty and realistic approach made it better suited to dedicated driving-game enthusiasts than casual players.

German magazine MAN!AC awarded the game 89 out of 100, praising it as an impressive racing simulation both visually and in its gameplay, while cautioning that arcade-racing fans might find its controls too demanding. Spanish magazine Revista Oficial Dreamcast gave the game 9 out of 10, particularly praising its realism, detailed driving model and range of options, while acknowledging its high level of difficulty.

The simulation's realism was also praised by professional racing drivers. In July 2000, Japanese motoring publication Response reported on a discussion published in Famitsu DC, in which Kazuo Shimizu praised the accuracy of the game's cornering and throttle behaviour, while Naoki Hattori commended the recreation of the Long Beach circuit for its resemblance to real racing.

The original arcade version won the award for Coin-op of the Year at the Edge Awards 2000, while Passione Rossa was a runner-up for GameSpot's annual "Best Driving Game" award, which went to Test Drive Le Mans. During the 4th Annual Interactive Achievement Awards, the Academy of Interactive Arts & Sciences nominated Passione Rossa for the "Console Racing" award, which ultimately went to SSX.

== See also ==
- Out Run
- Ferrari Challenge: Trofeo Pirelli
