= Quest of D =

2004 video game

- Arcade flyer for Quest of D Ver. 3
- Developer: Sega AM2
- Publisher: Sega
- Producer: Hiroshi Kataoka
- Composers: Fumio Ito; Keisuke Tsukahara; Megumi Takano; Sachio Ogawa
- Release: Arcade: JP: 2004; Quest of D Ver. 2.0: Gofu no Keisyousya: JP: 2005; Quest of D Ver 3.0: Oukoku no Syugosya: JP: 2006; Quest of D: The Battle Kingdom: JP: 2007
- Genres: Action role-playing game, digital collectible card game
- Arcade system: Chihiro

Quest of D is an arcade game developed by Sega AM2 and published by Sega on the Chihiro arcade board. It is the fifth trading card arcade game by Sega, following World Club Champion Football, Mushiking: The King of Beetles, The Key of Avalon and Love and Berry: Dress Up and Dance!. It is an action-role playing game in a dark fantasy setting and is online enabled similar to previous AM2 titles Virtua Fighter 4 and Sega Network Taisen Mahjong MJ.

The game's story revolves around finding "D", the book of evil. The game was updated three times, from 2005 to 2007. Its online features were shut down on the end of August 2010.

The official soundtrack was released in 2006. It was only released in Japan and received no port of any kind. The development team went on to make Shining Force Cross.

== Gameplay ==
The game has two card readers. One is for the IC card that saves progress, and one for the "D-Force" cards which are inserted as a deck. At first the player chooses between warrior, magician, priest and then their gender. Two modes are available, scenario and co-op. Scenario is designed for single-player use to start the game to level up and collect items. In co-op mode, nationwide online play is possible with a greater abundance of, and also stronger, enemies. After choosing a dungeon based on the preferred difficulty level, the deck of D-Force cards is inserted, which is obtained beforehand through a vending machine. The deck consists of items and equipment that is put on the character and is found in previous sessions. Up to four players go through a dungeon to fight enemies and collect treasure. The game utilizes an attack button, a guard button and a view button which adjusts the camera. Pushing attack three times does a weak combo, and a strong attack is activated pushing the attack and guard button at the same time. Pushing the attack and view button does a dodge move, while pushing attack, guard and view at once does a powerful surrounding attack that depletes the energy meter. Tapping the attack button while moving activates a run. The touchscreen is used to interact with the game's environments, such as tapping levers and treasure chests. It is also used to interact with the cards displayed at the bottom of the screen. The cards are utilized for magic and skill abilities which are used by pointing at an enemy for an offensive attack, while items that buff or heal player's character are used by dragging the card to the character.

Ver. 2 added three new classes, thief, dwarf and elf. Thief is able to jump and steal as new abilities exclusive to this class. Crafting items has also been made possible. Previously there was only an energy gauge, but now an MP gauge is added. New cards, items and dungeons have been added as well. Dungeons talking place outdoors have also been added for the first time.

For Ver. 3 the existing classes can be upgraded to higher tiers, where for example, the warrior can become a knight and wield dual weapons. Also added were summons, and a score attack. By Ver. 3, the game has reached over 500 collectible D-Force cards in total.

The final version, The Battle Kingdom, added a versus mode where players engage in close range combat and also set up traps. A second upgrade tier for existing classes has also been added.

== Development ==
Quest of D was first revealed during a private show, previously teased as a new game that AM2 has been working on.

The gap between playing online games on PC and arcades was wide, so Quest of D was made to close that gap as much as possible.

== Reception ==
The game was mentioned alongside Sangokushi Taisen in a 2005 financial report of Sega as a strong selling arcade title that explores new venues with trading cards and network features.

After a successful run of six years, it was said to be a rare example of a game that was genuinely missed by its community when the online was shut down.
