= Border Break =

2009 video game

- Developer: Sega AM2
- Publisher: Sega
- Producer: Noriyuki Shimoda
- Composer: Fumio Ito
- Platforms: Arcade, PlayStation 4
- Release: Arcade: JP: September 9, 2009; PlayStation 4: JP: August 2, 2018
- Genres: Action, mecha, third-person shooter
- Modes: Single-player, multiplayer
- Arcade system: Sega RingEdge

Border Break (ボーダーブレイク, Bōdā Bureiku) is a third-person mecha action arcade game developed and published by Sega. It is the first title to run on Sega's RingEdge arcade system board, and was released on September 9, 2009 in Japan, in Hong Kong on January 25, 2010, and in Taiwan on April 1, 2010. A PlayStation 4 version was released in Japan on August 2, 2018.

Within one month by the end of September 2009, at least 2,436 Border Break machines were sold to arcade operators, which increased to nearly 3,000 machines by the end of 2009. As of March 2012, the game has grossed ¥8.1 billion from arcade machine sales, equivalent to more than $100 million.

== Gameplay ==
The game focuses on robot battles through network connectivity between arcade cabinets. Two teams of ten robots battle across different landscapes, which include cities, towns, and facilities. In each map, each team's goal is to destroy the opposing team's energy reactor core, marked in red and blue respectively. At the end of each match, Class Points will be given to the player to level up their current rank.

The class point also affects the rank of the player. Generally, players who have just started the game will start playing in a series of cooperative battles against a computer-controlled "bots" team. The player will start facing actual opponents once when they have attained the rank of D4.

== Development ==
The development team was composed of people that worked on gun shooting games such as Virtua Cop and Ghost Squad. They wanted to create a type of party game where everyone would play together, and in the end thought that robots shooting each other would suit that desire. The team referred a lot to Counterstrike and Battlefield which the development team was playing a lot at the time. Third person shooter games were not common in Japan, and a new IP was also difficult, as mecha games are always going to be compared to Gundam.

The game was more successful than the team had originally thought, thinking that at most it would last five years, but it ended being supported for more than ten years. Not wanting to end up in a situation where the game would become unplayable in the future, a pitch was presented to port the game to PlayStation 4 in 2015, with the port releasing in 2018. Port requests have been there since the beginning, however Sega remained concerned that people stop going to arcade if it didn't remain arcade exclusive, only after the decrease of arcades across Japan and receiving player comments that they needed drive several hours to get to an arcade, it was decided that the game would receive a PlayStation 4 port. In 2019, Border Break celebrated its 10th Anniversary. In 2023, it was announced that service of the PlayStation 4 port will end on September 9. It was free-to-play. Story and Battle mode remain playable, however Exhibition Matches will require a PlayStation Plus subscription.

== Merchandise ==
Kotobukiya released a series of model kits featuring the mecha from the game. The nine were the Cougar I, released in January 2010, the Heavy Guard II, released in March 2010, the Shrike I, released in May 2010, the Cougar I(A class color) with heavy armament, released in June 2010, the Shrike I with assault armament, released in July 2010, the Zebra 41, released in September 2010, the Cougar S (S class color), released in November 2010, the Saber II, released in January 2011, and the Shrike V, released in March 2011.

A model kit of the mecha, Yaksha Rei released by Wave in July 2016.

A CD soundtrack was released in November 2009 in Japan. The majority of music from Border Break is a fusion between electronica and rock. A CD single by Japanese pop artist Mechanical Panda, was released separately and contains the opening theme song, "Last Brave~Go To Zero". A second CD soundtrack titled, "Border Break Airburst", was released on 12/22/10. The music contained on this release is from the 2.0 upgraded version of the game. A third soundtrack titled "Border Break Airburst 2", was released on 10/03/12. This expanded soundtrack was a digital-only release. A fourth and fifth soundtrack, titled "Border Break Union GRF" and "Border Break Union EUST" were released on 11/21/12. These expanded soundtracks were digital-only. A fifth soundtrack, titled "Border Break Scramble" was released on 5/14/14 in Japan. The release was again digital-only and contained music from the latest version of the game.

Four walkthrough guides and an artbook have been released. The Border Break Art Book was translated in English by Udon Entertainment, and released in 2015.

Two novels have been released, Border Break Nemesis Day (2012) and Border Break Historica (2014). A manga began in 2012.

== Reception ==
Mechadamashii.com gave the game a 9/10 when the game was released new in 2009, saying: "Though the truly striking thing about Border Break, more than any other, is how seamless the game integrates a Western design approach for a PC shooter with the very Japanese rule sets that ensconce its mecha mythos."
