= Aero Elite: Combat Academy =

2002 video game

- North American cover art
- Developer: Sega AM2
- Publisher: Sega
- Director: Toshihide Ozeki
- Producer: Shinya Izumi
- Designers: Shinya Izumi; Toshihide Ozeki; Tomonori Haba
- Artist: Toshiyuki Adachi
- Composers: Fumio Ito; Keisuke Tsukahara; Seiichi Hamada; Osamu Murata
- Platform: PlayStation 2
- Release: JP: July 11, 2002; NA: March 11, 2003
- Genre: Combat flight simulator
- Modes: Single-player, multiplayer

Aero Elite: Combat Academy (Note: Japanese: エアロダンシング4 ニュージェネレーション, Hepburn: Earo Danshingu 4 Nyū Jenerēshon; lit. Aero Dancing 4: New Generation) is a combat flight simulator developed by Sega AM2 and published by Sega for PlayStation 2. It is the fourth and final game in the AeroWings/Aero Dancing series. It features over 60 planes to fly (including Mig 29, SU27, Mirage2000, Harrier, A10, Tornado, etc.) and new features like the "scramble" mode - a random interception mission where a player must take off, intercept an unknown intruder plane, take pictures to identify it, then return to the base and land to finish the mission.

== Reception ==
Reception

Aggregate score
| Aggregator | Score |
|---|---|
| Metacritic | 64/100 |

Review scores
| Publication | Score |
|---|---|
| Electronic Gaming Monthly | 7/10 |
| Famitsu | 30/40 |
| Game Informer | 6.75/10 |
| GamePro | 2/5 |
| GameSpot | 6.2/10 |
| GameSpy | 3/5 |
| GameZone | 6.4/10 |
| IGN | 6.5/10 |
| Official U.S. PlayStation Magazine | 3/5 |
| X-Play | 3/5 |
| The Village Voice | 7/10 |

The game received "mixed" reviews according to the review aggregation website Metacritic. In Japan, Famitsu gave it a score of 30 out of 40.
