= Sega AM2 =

Japanese video game developer

Sega AM Research & Development No. 2
- Logo used as SEGA-AM2 Co., Ltd.
- Trade name: Sega AM2
- Formerly: Studio 128 (1986-1988); Sega R&D8 (1988-1990); Sega AM R&D Dept. #2 (1990-1999); Sega Software R&D Dept #2 (AM2) (1999-2000); AM2 of CRI (2000-2001); SEGA-AM2 Co., Ltd. (2001-2004); AM R&D Dept. #2 (2004-2011); Sega R&D2 (2011-2015); Sega Interactive R&D2 (2015-2020)
- Type: Division
- Industry: Video games
- Predecessor: Sega R&D1
- Founder: Yu Suzuki
- Headquarters: Tokyo, Japan
- Key people: Yu Suzuki; Toshihiro Nagoshi; Makoto Osaki; Hiroshi Kataoka
- Products: Arcade games, video games
- Parent: Sega

Sega AM Research & Development No. 2, (Note: Japanese: セガ第二AM研究開発部, Hepburn: Sega Daini Ē Emu Kenkyū Kaihatsu Bu) previously known as SEGA-AM2 Co., Ltd., (Note: Japanese: 株式会社SEGA-AM2, Hepburn: Kabushiki gaisha Sega Ē Emu Tsū) is a video game development team within the Japanese multinational video game developer Sega. Yu Suzuki, who had previously developed arcade games for Sega including Hang-On and Out Run, was the first manager of the department.

AM2's first game produced was 1992's Virtua Racing, followed by the highly popular Virtua Fighter and Daytona USA. Through the remainder of the 1990s, they developed more arcade titles and focused on fighting and racing games. AM2 was placed under the management of CSK Research Institute in 2000, and a year later became SEGA-AM2 Co., Ltd. Their development of Shenmue was over budget and cost millions of dollars, and despite positive reviews and good sales was unable to become profitable.

Suzuki was promoted and left AM2 in 2003; Hiroshi Kataoka became the head of AM2. A year later Sega was acquired by Sammy Corporation and AM2 was merged back into Sega. Since, the team has continued work on arcade games such as Border Break and the Hatsune Miku: Project DIVA series, as well as smartphone games in Japan. Several games produced by Sega AM2 have influenced and innovated the video game industry from a technical and developmental perspective.

== History ==
=== Precursors to AM2: Yu Suzuki and Studio 128 ===
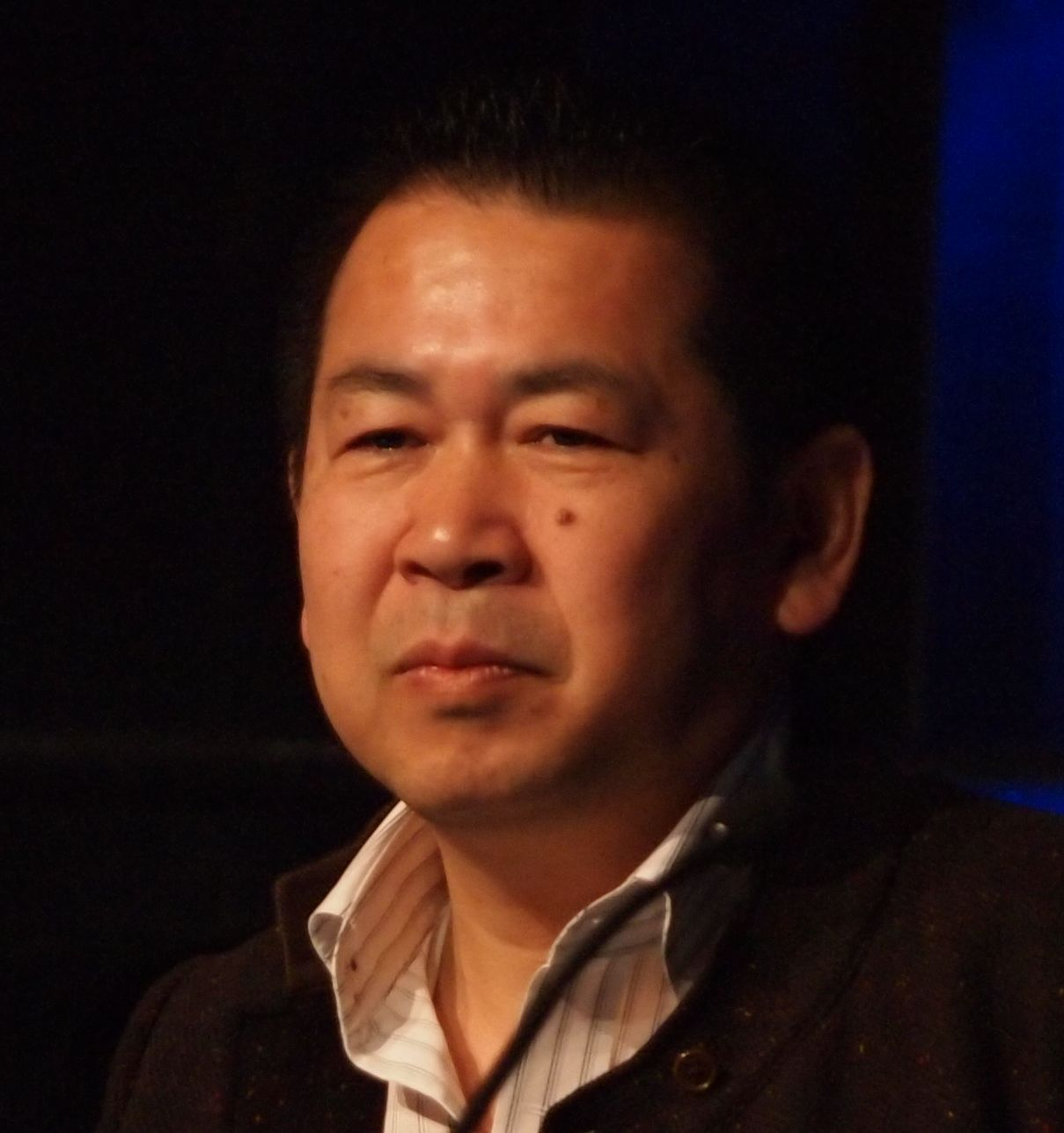
Yu Suzuki, the first head of AM2

Yu Suzuki joined Sega in 1983 as a programmer. At the time Suzuki joined Sega, there was only one development division at the company. In his first year, he created a 2D boxing game called Champion Boxing for Sega's first home game console, the SG-1000. According to Suzuki, the executive staff at Sega found the game so impressive that they released it in arcades as-is by simply installing an SG-1000 into an arcade cabinet. He was promoted to project leader while still in his first year at the company. Suzuki's next project was the motorcycle racing game Hang-On. To accomplish his desire to make a 3D game despite technological limitations at the time, he specified the design of Sega's new Super Scaler arcade system board, which used 16-bit graphics and sprite-scaling. Hang-On was popular at launch and sold well. Suzuki had further success with the games Space Harrier (1985), Out Run (1986), and Enduro Racer (1986). The team relocated to "Studio 128", a more private location where After Burner and Power Drift were developed. Suzuki also worked on development of G-LOC: Air Battle and the R360 arcade cabinet. Toshihiro Nagoshi joined Sega in 1989 as a designer with Suzuki's team.

=== Establishment of AM2 and years as a department ===
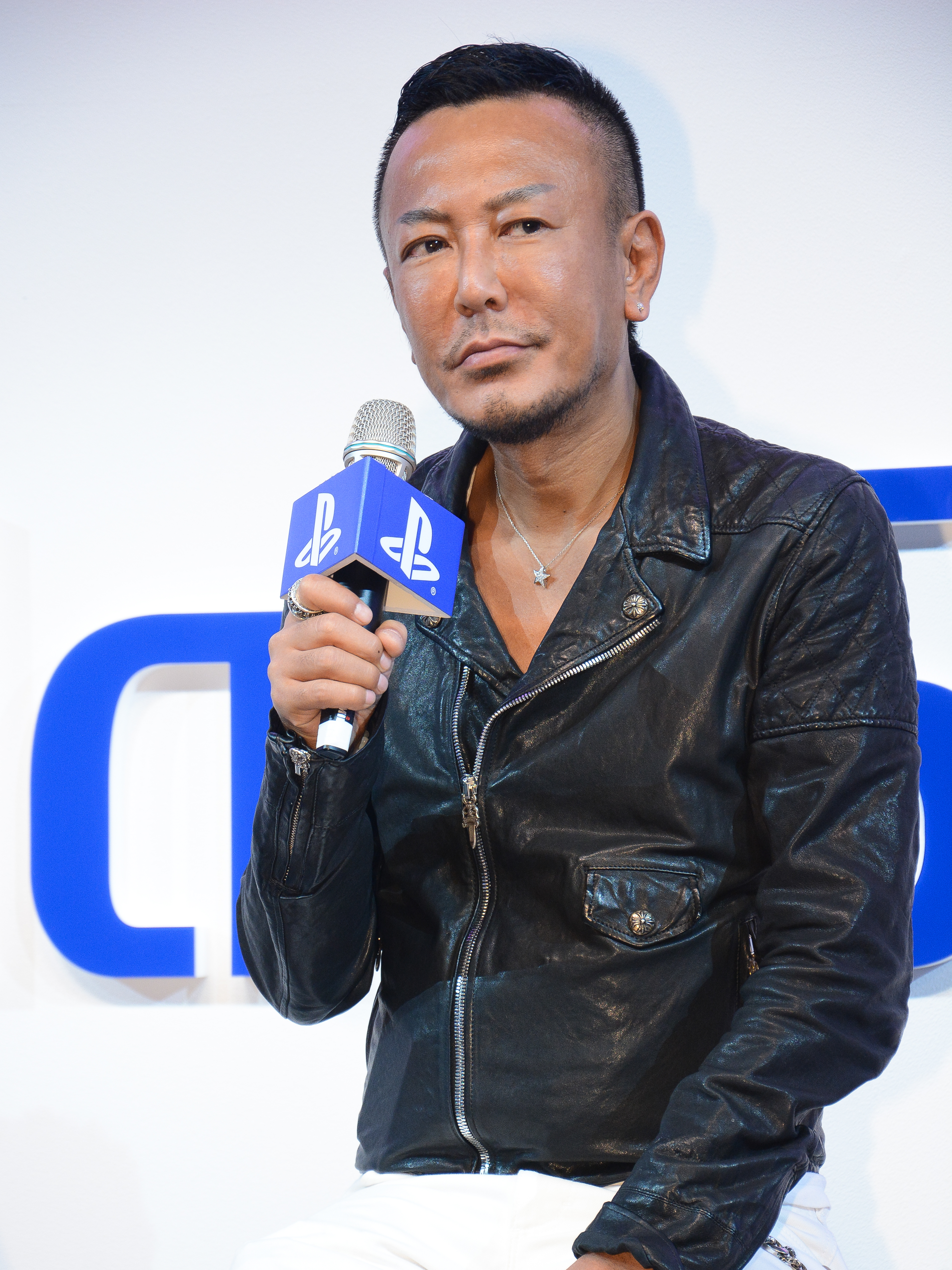
Toshihiro Nagoshi joined Sega as a member of Yu Suzuki's team, and was a designer with AM2.

Some time after the release of Power Drift, Sega began to separate the amusement division into the Amusement Machine Research and Development teams, or AM teams. Suzuki was made general manager of Research and Development No. 2, or Sega AM2. According to Suzuki, Sega employed approximately 600 people in research and development, and that AM2 began as a group of around 100 people. He has also stated the reason for this separation was the advent of advanced computer graphics technology. Around the time of AM2's formation, Suzuki's team moved back into the main office, then to an annex a short walk from the office. Even so, Suzuki worked with a desire of secrecy, so much so that Sega president Hayao Nakayama was denied entry on one occasion.

The first project developed by AM2 was Virtua Racing. While development began with 10 people on Virtua Racing, it finished with 25 workers on the project for a year, and the Model 1 arcade system board on which it runs took approximately three years. AM2 also ported the game for the Sega Genesis. Next Generation stated that AM2 "single-handedly chang[ed] the perception of polygons in a gaming environment" with Virtua Racing.

After the release of Virtua Racing, AM2 split into two teams; one began work on Virtua Fighter, while another started on Daytona USA. According to Suzuki, he wanted to develop a game with multiple joint movements, such as a soccer or rugby game. Finding that the Model 1 was not powerful enough to handle this many motions, Suzuki resorted to a game with only two moving characters at a time. With the massive success of Street Fighter II in the industry at the time, he made the decision to make a 3D fighting game to compete. In developing the game, Suzuki identified the need for the game to be realistic, yet fun to play. Virtua Fighter became a huge success in Japan, and its Sega Saturn port sold at a nearly one-to-one ratio with the console itself.

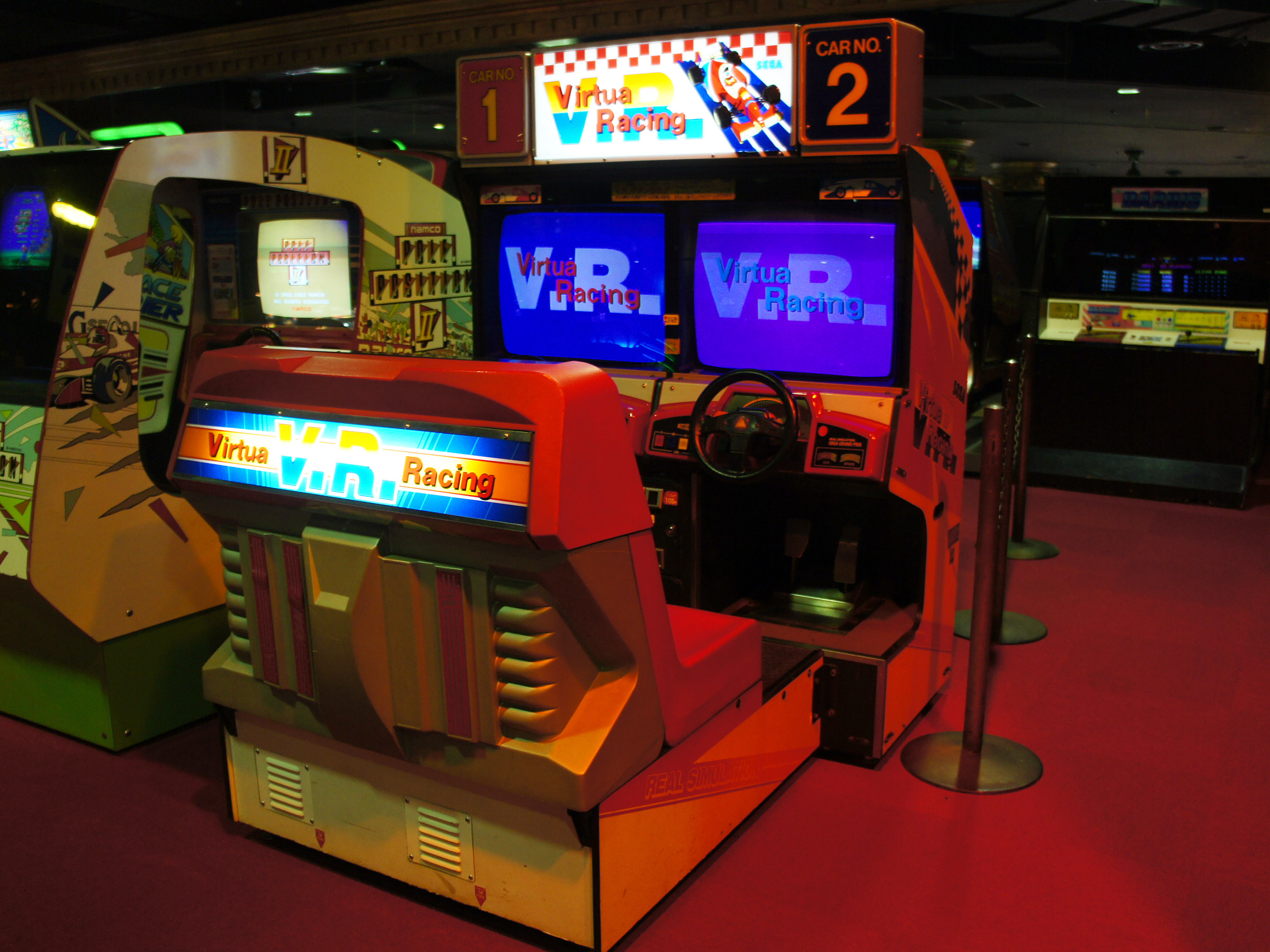
Virtua Racing Twin Cabinet

For Daytona USA, Nagoshi was director and chief designer, while Suzuki served as producer. The concept for the game was suggested by Tom Petit, head of Sega Enterprises USA, as a way to debut Sega's new Model 2 arcade system board. Sega mandated that Daytona USA had to be better than Ridge Racer, a game made by Namco. To accurately depict Daytona International Speedway, the developers used satellite imagery and sent staff to photograph the track; Nagoshi walked a full lap to get a feel for the banking in the corners. Daytona USA was released in Japan in August 1993, and worldwide in March 1994. AM2 ported the game to Saturn in April 1995. The Saturn port was a launch title in the West. Daytona USA was highly popular in arcades, and the twin cabinet was one of three 1995 recipients of the American Amusement Machine Association's Diamond Awards, which are based strictly on sales achievements. In a 2002 report, Sega reported it to be one of the most successful arcade games of all time.

Over the course of the remainder of the 1990s, Suzuki's primary concern in arcades were the Virtua Fighter series and working as a producer for other titles. Subsequently, AM2 released Virtua Cop and Virtua Fighter 2 for the Model 2. Produced in twelve months, Virtua Fighter 2 was an even greater success in Japan than its predecessor. In a 1996 interview, Suzuki stated in an interview his philosophy to be not an imitator, but a pioneer in the arcade industry. He also described the palm tree logo of AM2 as representing reliance and peace of mind. Further titles developed in the end of 1990s included Virtua Cop 2, Fighting Vipers, Daytona USA 2: Battle on the Edge, and SpikeOut. Daytona USA 2 and SpikeOut made use of the Model 3 system board.

=== AM2 of CRI and SEGA-AM2 Co., Ltd. ===
In April 2000, CSK Research Institute (CRI) took management over AM2. CRI was a subsidiary of CSK Corporation, which was Sega's parent company at the time, and had previously published Aero Dancing. The new division became known as "AM2 of CRI", and Suzuki remained in charge. Also in 2000, Sega restructured its arcade and console development teams into nine semi-autonomous studios headed by the company's top designers. Sega's design houses were encouraged to experiment and benefited from a relatively lax approval process. During the development of Shenmue, Nagoshi requested and was granted his own studio, leaving AM2.

AM2 developed what Sega hoped would be the Dreamcast's killer app in Shenmue, a "revenge epic in the tradition of Chinese cinema." The action-adventure game involved the quest of protagonist Ryo Hazuki to avenge his father's murder, but its main selling point was its rendition of the Japanese city of Yokosuka, which included a level of detail considered unprecedented for a video game. Incorporating a simulated day/night cycle with variable weather, non-player characters with regular schedules, and the ability to pick up and examine detailed objects (also introducing the Quick-time event in its modern form), Shenmue went over budget and was rumored to have cost Sega over $50 million. Originally planned as the first installment in an 11-part saga, Shenmue was eventually downsized to a trilogy. According to Sega of America president Peter Moore, Shenmue sold "extremely well", but the game had no chance of making a profit due to the Dreamcast's limited installed base. The high amount Shenmue went over budget was also a factor in the game's lack of profitability. Its sequel, Shenmue II, "was completed for a much more reasonable sum".

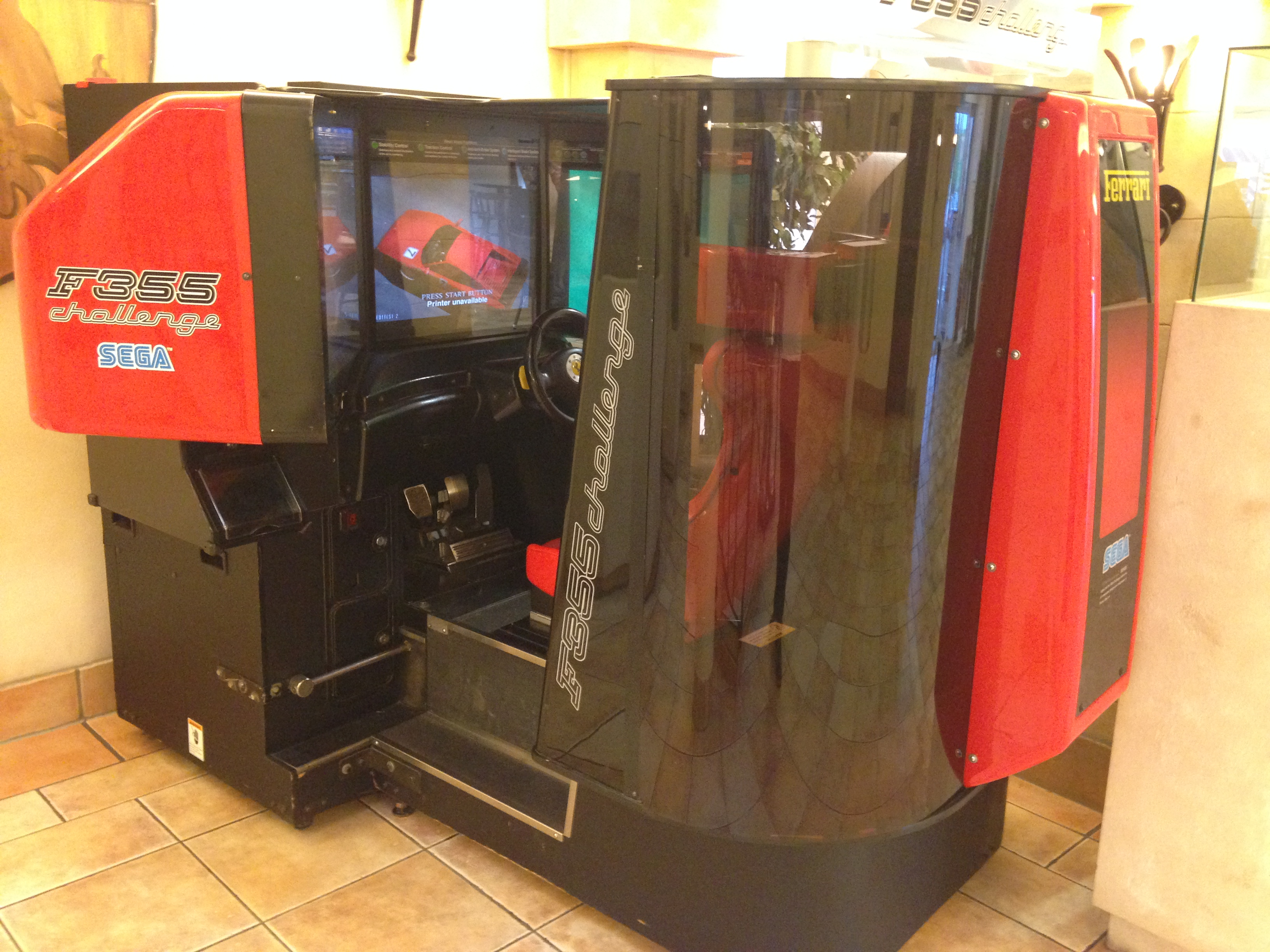
F355 Challenge, developed by AM2

In addition to the mixed reception for Shenmue, IGN's Travis Fahs stated that "the [Dreamcast] era wasn't as kind to [AM2] as earlier years"—citing (among others) F355 Challenge as an "acclaimed" arcade game that "didn't do much at home", and Genki's port of Virtua Fighter 3 as inferior to the arcade version, "which was already a couple years old and never as popular as its predecessors." The Virtua Fighter series would experience a "tremendous comeback" with the universally acclaimed Virtua Fighter 4—which saw a console release exclusively on PlayStation 2. In Japanese arcades, Virtua Fighter 4 proved to be highly influential with its VF.NET system, paving the way for arcade games with network features. The quest mode of Virtua Fighter 4: Evolution on PlayStation 2, used AI mined from players in Japan playing through VF.NET.

In 2001, AM2 of CRI was renamed to SEGA-AM2 Co., Ltd. After serving as a producer on Virtua Cop 3 and OutRun 2, Suzuki left AM2 on October 1, 2003, in order to start a new studio with Sega, called Digitalrex. He was promoted to non-executive board director. Hiroshi Kataoka was placed in charge of AM2. Kataoka, who had led research and development at AM2 for a year, had worked on numerous projects for Sega and Yu Suzuki's division as old as Space Harrier to Virtua Fighter 4 Evolution. Makoto Osaki became AM2's head of development, reporting to Kataoka. At the same time as the changes, a number of Sega's studios were merged. However, AM2 did not merge with any other studio.

=== Merge into Sega and years since ===
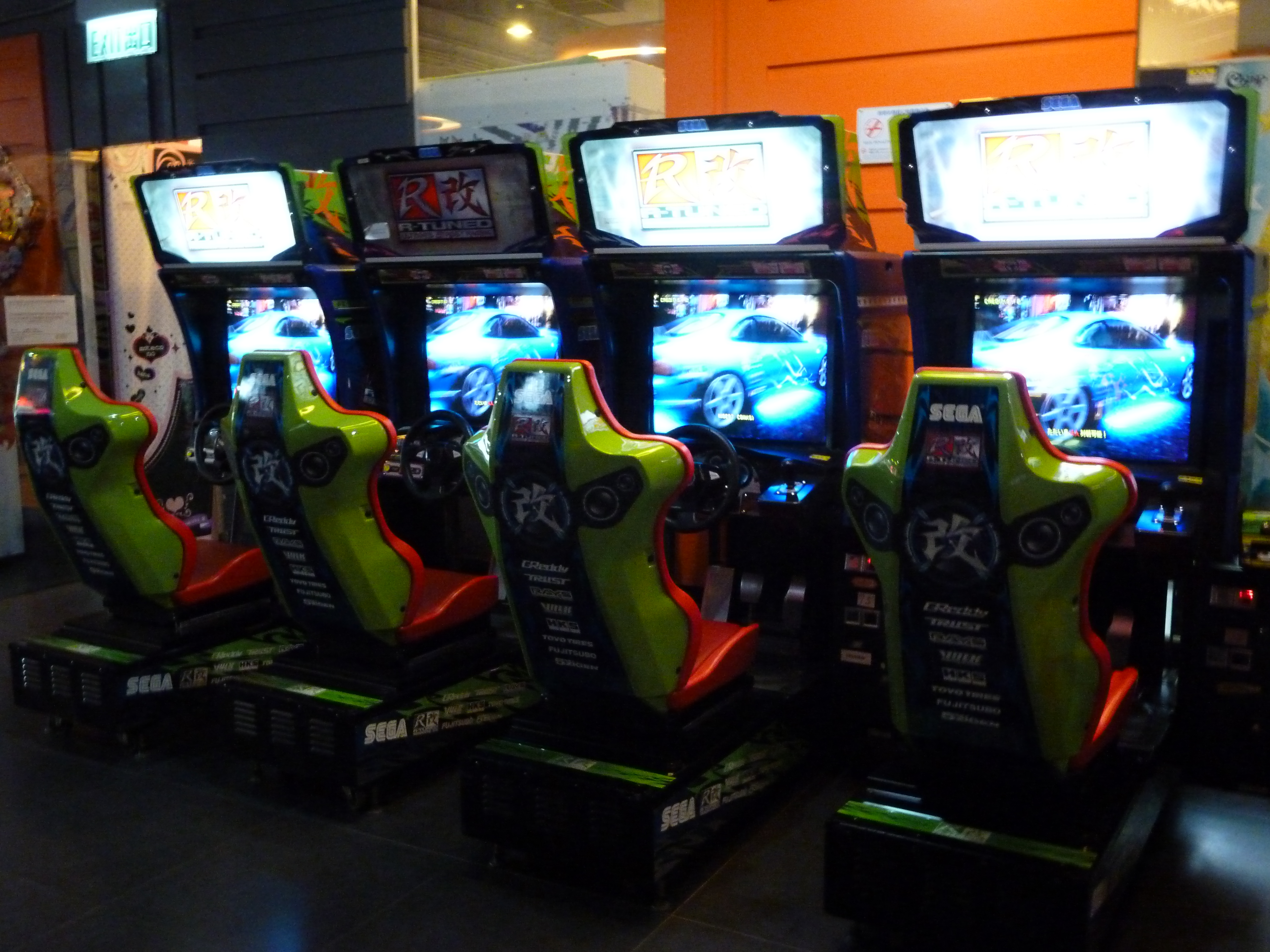
AM2's R-Tuned : Ultimate Street Racing cabinet

During mid-2004, Sammy Corporation bought a controlling share in Sega and created the new company Sega Sammy Holdings, an entertainment conglomerate. Since then, Sega and Sammy became subsidiaries of the aforementioned holding company, with both companies operating independently, while the executive departments merged. Prior to the acquisition by Sammy, Sega began the process of re-integrating its subsidiaries into the main company, which was completed by October 2004. Sega would also restructure the development studios again, consolidating the divisions further into the Global Entertainment, Amusement Software, and New Entertainment R&D divisions.

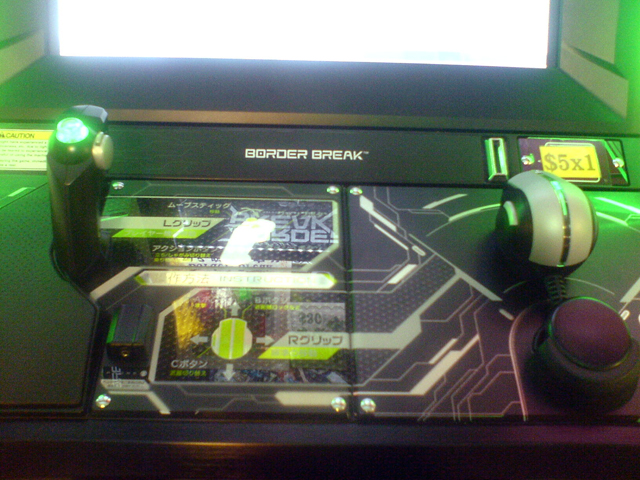
The controllers for Border Break

AM2 continued to develop games after the merger. The console version of Virtua Fighter 5 was released in 2007. An upgrade, Virtua Fighter 5 R, was released the following year only for arcades. The last release of the Virtua Fighter franchise was the console port of Virtua Fighter 5: Final Showdown, the final iteration of the game. Ghost Squad, in the style of Virtua Cop, received a port to the Wii in 2008. AM2 has developed games for the Hatsune Miku: Project DIVA series, as well as a number of free-to-play smartphone games in Japan, such as Soul Reverse Zero. Some titles have been developed for consoles as well, such as Hatsune Miku: Project Diva Mega 39’s for Nintendo Switch. AM2 became involved with the Hatsune Miku license with items for Virtua Fighter 5 R and the racing game R-Tuned: Ultimate Street Racing. When the PSP game Hatsune Miku: Project DIVA was in development, it was decided that AM2 would develop an arcade version as well as develop the holographic imagery for Hatsune Miku's live concerts. The visuals for these projects were based on the Virtua Fighter 5 engine. Makoto Osaki called this period the most stressful for him since Shenmue.

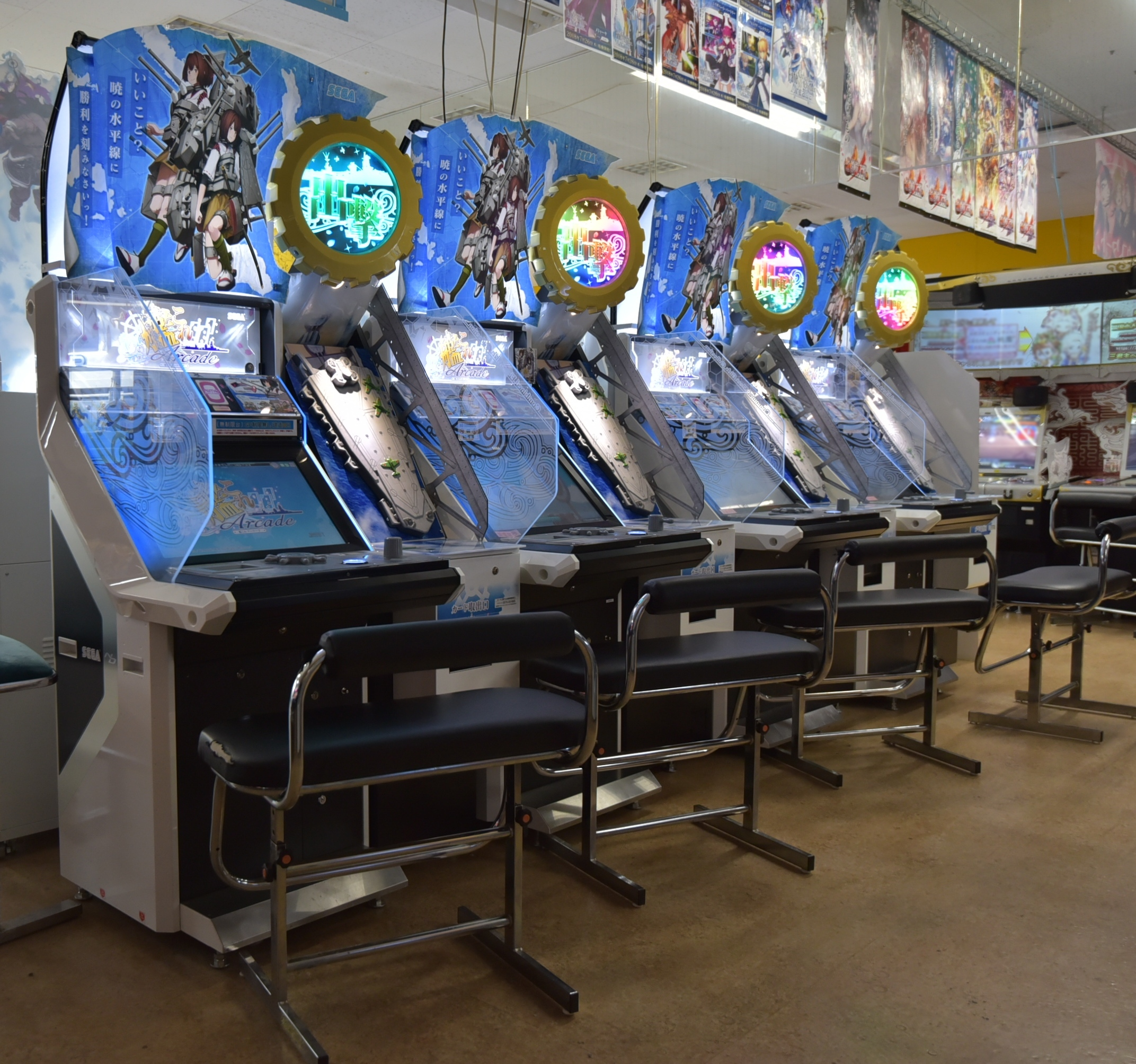
Arcade version of Kantai Collection

A major success for AM2 has been Border Break. The game was partly developed because the development team felt envious of the Virtua Fighter 5 team and wanted to develop a competitive game as well. The arcade release in 2009 was continuously updated, with releases Border Break Union in 2012, Border Break Scramble in 2015, and Border Break X in 2017—with a PlayStation 4 version released in 2018. Port requests have been there since the beginning, however Sega remained concerned that people stop going to arcade if it didn't remain arcade exclusive, only after the decrease of arcades across Japan and receiving player comments that they needed drive several hours to get to an arcade, it was decided that the game would receive a PlayStation 4 port. In 2019, Border Break celebrated its 10th Anniversary.

Other titles from AM2 to get long-term support in arcades are Quest of D, Sega Network Taisen Mahjong MJ, and Shining Force Cross. Hiroshi Kataoka likened the basic enjoyability of these network-based arcade games to those of an MMO, but collectible cards and a community differentiated these from the usually solitary MMO experience on PC. According to Sega Amusement International CEO Paul Williams, these types of core games are only possible in Japan due to Sega owning their own chains and being able to kickstart an online infrastructure. The latest effort, Soul Reverse, was born out of the desire to create a fantasy version of Border Break. It lasted a year, launching in 2018 with its network features shutting down in 2019. The game was not well received by the Japanese arcade player base. It took four years to produce. Currently running arcade games with AM2 staff working on them are KanColle Arcade, Fate/Grand Order Arcade as well as an updated version of Virtua Fighter 5, Virtua Fighter 5: Ultimate Showdown, co-developed with Ryu Ga Gotoku Studio. As of 2024, AM2 was consolidated under the jurisdiction of RGG Studio and Masayoshi Yokoyama.

As of 2014, Hiroshi Kataoka was still in charge of AM2. Currently he is an executive for Sega supervising arcade engineers and the technology backend of all Sega games.

== Games ==
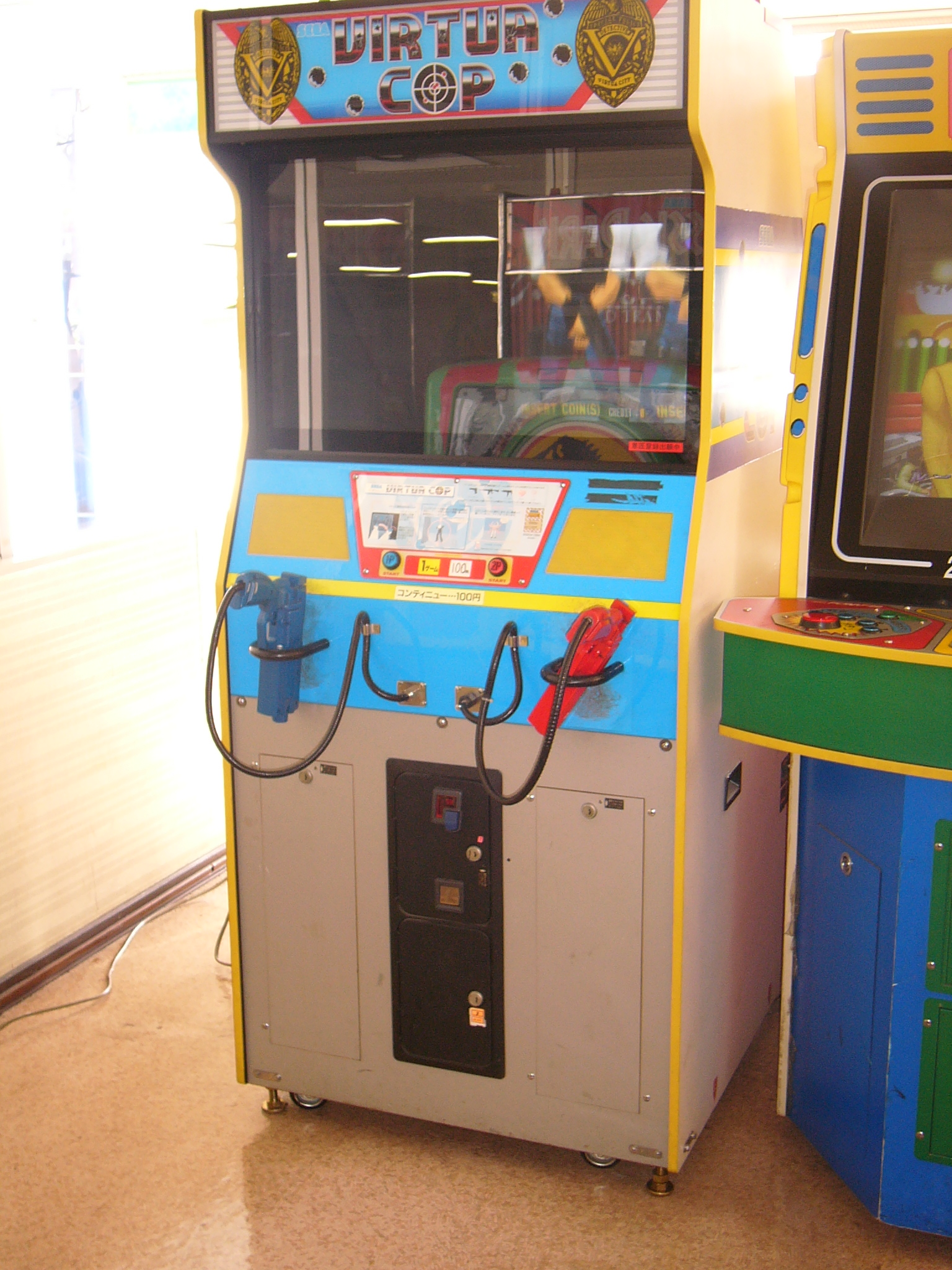
A Virtua Cop arcade cabinet

AM2 games include Daytona USA, Virtua Fighter, OutRun, Virtua Cop, Virtua Striker, Fighting Vipers, Shenmue, Scud Race, Sonic the Fighters, 18 Wheeler: American Pro Trucker, F355 Challenge, Outtrigger, and Soul Reverse. AM2 has also developed smartphone games in Japan. The Virtua Fighter series is the highest-grossing AM2 game in Japanese arcades. The Hatsune Miku: Project Diva series has sold over 6 million units as of 2018. As of March 2012, Border Break had grossed JP¥8.1 billion from arcade machine sales, equivalent to more than US$100 million.

Journalists have praised AM2 as "legendary", in particular under Suzuki. According to Aaron Souppouris of Engadget, AM2 in the past developed games that defined their genres, and called the department Sega's "most-storied division". While lamenting the changes in development focus in recent years, Souppouris called the Hatsune Miku series "admittedly excellent". In 1995, Edge called Suzuki "the legendary head of AM2, Sega's core coin-op operation". Also in 1995, Next Generation stated that AM2's unusual repeated success came from its ability to release high-quality games on a regular basis. IGN's Travis Fahs stated that "[f]or as long as Sega has had internal studios, AM2 has been the favorite son of the arcade division... Without AM2, Sega would not have been able to dominate the arcades the way that they did." The researcher Ken Horowitz wrote that AM2 became the most well-known of Sega's in-house development teams and that the studio produced "ground-breaking classics".

=== Developed games ===
Full list
Title	Year released	Platform	Ref.
Hang-On	1985	Sega Hang-On hardware	
Space Harrier	1985	Sega Space Harrier hardware	
Out Run	1986	Sega OutRun hardware	
After Burner	1987	Sega X Board	
After Burner II	1987	Sega X Board	
Power Drift	1988	Sega Y Board	
Dynamite Düx	1988	Sega System 16	
Turbo OutRun	1989	Sega OutRun hardware	
Sword of Vermilion	1989	Sega Mega Drive	
G-LOC: Air Battle	1990	Sega Y Board	
GP Rider	1990	Sega X Board	
Strike Fighter	1991	Sega Y Board	
Rent a Hero	1991	Sega Mega Drive	
F1 Exhaust Note	1991	Sega System 32	
Arabian Fight	1992	Sega System 32	
Virtua Racing	1992	Sega Model 1	
Soreike Kokology	1992	Sega System 32	
Burning Rival	1993	Sega System 32	
Virtua Fighter	1993	Sega Model 1	
Daytona USA	1994	Sega Model 2	
Desert Tank	1994	Sega Model 2	
Virtua Cop	1994	Sega Model 2	
Virtua Fighter	1994	Sega Saturn	
Virtua Fighter 2	1994	Sega Model 2	
Virtua Racing	1994	Sega Mega Drive	
Daytona USA	1995	Sega Saturn	
Virtua Fighter 2	1995	Sega Saturn	
Virtua Fighter Remix	1995	Sega Saturn	
Virtua Striker	1995	Sega Model 2	
Virtua Cop 2	1995	Sega Model 2	
Fighting Vipers	1995	Sega Model 2	
Virtua Cop 2	1996	Sega Saturn	
Virtua Fighter 2 CG Portrait Series	1996	Sega Saturn	
Virtua Fighter Kids	1996	Sega ST-V, Sega Saturn	
Virtua Fighter 3	1996	Sega Model 3	
Fighters Megamix	1996	Sega Saturn	
Fighting Vipers	1996	Sega Saturn	
Scud Race	1996	Sega Model 3	
Sonic the Fighters	1996	Sega Model 2	
Digital Dance Mix Vol. 1 Namie Amuro	1997	Sega Saturn	
Scud Race Plus	1997	Sega Model 3	
Virtua Fighter 3tb	1997	Sega Model 3	
Fighting Vipers 2	1998	Sega Model 3	
Daytona USA 2: Battle on the Edge	1998	Sega Model 3	
Daytona USA 2: Power Edition	1998	Sega Model 3	
Virtua Fighter 3tb	1998	Dreamcast	
Ferrari F355 Challenge	1999	Sega NAOMI Multiboard	
Outtrigger	1999	Sega NAOMI	
18 Wheeler: American Pro Trucker	1999	Sega NAOMI	
Shenmue	1999	Dreamcast	
18 Wheeler: American Pro Trucker	2000	Dreamcast	
Ferrari F355 Challenge	2000	Dreamcast	
Beach Spikers	2001	Sega NAOMI	
F355 Challenge 2 International Course Edition	2001	Sega NAOMI Multiboard	
Fighting Vipers 2	2001	Dreamcast	
Shenmue II	2001	Dreamcast	
Outtrigger	2001	Dreamcast	
Virtua Fighter 4	2001	Sega NAOMI 2	
Aero Elite: Combat Academy	2002	PlayStation 2	
Beach Spikers	2002	GameCube	
Ferrari F355 Challenge	2002	PlayStation 2	
Sega Network Taisen Mahjong MJ	2002	Sega NAOMI 2	
Shenmue II	2002	Xbox	
The King of Route 66	2002	Sega NAOMI 2	
Virtua Cop: Elite Edition	2002	PlayStation 2	
Virtua Fighter 4	2002	PlayStation 2	
Virtua Fighter 4: Evolution	2002	Sega NAOMI 2	
Choujikuu Yousai Macross	2003	PlayStation 2	
Virtua Cop 3	2003	Sega Chihiro	
Sega Network Taisen Mahjong MJ2	2003	Sega Chihiro	
The King of Route 66	2003	PlayStation 2	
OutRun 2	2003	Sega Chihiro	
Virtua Fighter 4 Evolution	2003	PlayStation 2	
Ghost Squad	2004	Sega Chihiro	
Quest of D	2004	Sega Chihiro	
Sega Ages 2500 Vol. 16: Virtua Fighter 2	2004	PlayStation 2	
Sega Golf Club	2004	Sega Chihiro	
OutRun 2 SP	2004	Sega Chihiro	
Virtua Fighter 4 Final Tuned	2004	Sega NAOMI 2	
Virtua Quest	2004	PlayStation 2, GameCube	
Quest of D Ver. 2.0: Gofu no Keisyousya	2005	Sega Chihiro	
Sega Ages 2500 Vol. 19: Fighting Vipers	2005	PlayStation 2	
Sega Network Taisen Mahjong MJ3	2005	Sega Chihiro	
Sonic Gems Collection (Sonic the Fighters)	2005	GameCube, PlayStation 2	
After Burner: Climax	2006	Sega Lindbergh	
Quest of D Ver 3.0: Oukoku no Syugosya	2006	Sega Chihiro	
Sega Golf Club Ver. 2006	2006	Sega Chihiro	
Miyazato San Kyoudai Naizou: Sega Golfclub	2006	PlayStation 3	
Virtua Fighter 5	2006	Sega Lindbergh	
Ghost Squad Evolution	2007	Sega Chihiro	
Ghost Squad	2007	Wii	
Quest of D: The Battle Kingdom	2007	Sega Chihiro	
Sega Network Casino Club	2007	Sega Lindbergh	
Virtua Fighter 5	2007	Xbox 360, PlayStation 3	
R-Tuned: Ultimate Street Racing	2008	Sega Lindbergh	
Sega Network Casino Club Ver. 2	2008	Sega Lindbergh	
Sega Network Taisen Mahjong MJ4	2008	Sega Lindbergh	
Virtua Fighter 5 R	2008	Sega Lindbergh	
Border Break	2009	Sega RingeEdge	
Cyber Troopers Virtual-On Oratorio Tangram	2009	Xbox 360, PlayStation 3	
Sega Racing Classic	2009	Sega RingWide	
Sega Network Casino Club Ver. 3	2009	Sega Lindbergh	
Shining Force Cross	2009	Sega RingEdge	
After Burner: Climax	2010	Xbox 360, PlayStation 3	
Border Break Airburst	2010	Sega RingEdge	
Cyber Troopers Virtual-On Force	2010	Xbox 360	
Hatsune Miku: Project DIVA Arcade	2010	Sega RingEdge	
Shining Force Cross Raid	2010	Sega RingEdge	
Virtua Fighter 5 Final Showdown	2010	Sega Lindbergh	
Daytona USA	2011	Xbox 360, PlayStation 3	
Sega Network Taisen Mahjong MJ5	2011	Sega RingEdge	
Border Break Union	2012	Sega RingEdge	
Fighting Vipers	2012	Xbox 360, PlayStation 3	
Hatsune Miku and Future Stars: Project Mirai	2012	Nintendo 3DS	
Shining Force Cross Elysion	2012	Sega RingEdge	
Sonic the Fighters	2012	Xbox 360, PlayStation 3	
Virtua Fighter 2	2012	Xbox 360, PlayStation 3	
Virtua Fighter 5: Final Showdown	2012	Xbox 360, PlayStation 3	
Hatsune Miku: Project DIVA Arcade Future Tone	2013	Sega Nu	
Hatsune Miku: Project Mirai 2	2013	Nintendo 3DS	
Sega Network Taisen Mahjong MJ	2013	Microsoft Windows	
Sega Network Taisen Mahjong MJ5R	2013	Sega RingEdge	
Shining Force Cross Elysion	2013	Sega RingEdge	
Virtual On: Cyber Troopers	2013	Xbox 360, PlayStation 3	
Virtua Striker	2013	Xbox 360, PlayStation 3	
Border Break Scramble	2014	Sega RingEdge	
Shining Force Cross Exlesia Zenith	2014	Sega RingEdge	
Sega Network Taisen Mahjong MJ Mobile	2014	iOS, Android	
Border Break X	2016	Sega RingEdge	
Hatsune Miku: Project DIVA Future Tone	2016	PlayStation 4	
Kancolle Arcade	2016	Sega Nu	
Soul Reverse Zero	2016	iOS Android	
Border Break X Zero	2017	Sega RingEdge	
Sega Network Taisen Mahjong MJ Arcade	2017	Sega Nu	
Border Break	2018	PlayStation 4	
Soul Reverse	2018	ALLS UX	
Fate/Grand Order Arcade	2018	ALLS UX	
Hatsune Miku: Project DIVA Mega Mix	2020	Switch	
Virtua Fighter 5 Ultimate Showdown (Note: Co-developed with Ryu Ga Gotoku Studio)	2021	ALLS UX, PlayStation 4	
Hatsune Miku: Project DIVA Mega Mix +	2022	Microsoft Windows	
Virtua Fighter 3tb Online	2023	Arcade	
Virtua Fighter 5 R.E.V.O. (Note: Co-developed with Ryu Ga Gotoku Studio)	2025	Microsoft Windows	

== See also ==
- Sega development studios
- Sega AM1
- Sega AM3
- Amusement Vision
- Smilebit
- Sonic Team
- United Game Artists
