= 18 Wheeler: American Pro Trucker =

1999 video game

- Arcade flyer
- Developer: Sega AM2 (Note: Ported to PlayStation 2 and GameCube by Acclaim Studios Cheltenham)
- Publisher: Sega (Note: The PlayStation 2 and GameCube versions were published by Acclaim Entertainment.)
- Director: Keiichi Matsunami
- Producer: Yu Suzuki
- Composers: Keisuke Tsukahara; Tomoya Koga
- Platforms: Arcade, Dreamcast, PlayStation 2, GameCube
- Release: December 1999: Arcade; JP: December 1999; NA: November 9, 2000 Dreamcast; JP: October 12, 2000; NA: May 22, 2001; EU: June 1, 2001 PlayStation 2; NA: November 13, 2001; EU: November 23, 2001; JP: December 5, 2002 GameCube; NA: February 20, 2002; EU: May 31, 2002; JP: September 12, 2002
- Genres: Vehicle simulation, action
- Modes: Single-player, multiplayer
- Arcade system: Sega NAOMI

18 Wheeler: American Pro Trucker (Note: known in Japan as 18 Wheeler (エイティーン･ホイーラー, Eitīn Hoīrā)) is an arcade game developed by Sega AM2 and distributed by Sega. The game was released in arcades in 1999 and ported to the Dreamcast in 2000. It was released for the PlayStation 2 in 2001 and GameCube in 2002 by Acclaim Entertainment. Sega followed up on the success of 18 Wheeler with a sequel, The King of Route 66, which was released in the arcades in 2002 and ported to the PlayStation 2. This was one of the final arcade games to be ported to the Dreamcast after its discontinuation, before Sega became a third-party developer.

== Gameplay ==
Players start the game going from New York City, New York to Key West, Florida (shown here), driving a tank truck.

The main purpose of the game is to make it to the finish line with the truck's cargo. Players are given a set amount of time, but can ram into special vans that will add three seconds to the timer. There are several characters to choose from, each with a unique truck and attributes.

The game starts out in New York City, New York and players travel across the United States of America, ending in San Francisco, California. After Stage 1, the game gives the player a choice of trailer. One trailer is harder to haul, but provides a bigger payoff while the other choice is easier to haul but provides a smaller payoff. Money is deducted from the total when the trailer is hit. Players can sound the truck's horn to make other cars on the road yield and slipstream behind large vehicles to gain a momentary speed boost.

In addition to the time limit, players also compete with a rival trucker named Lizard Tail. Crossing the finish line before Lizard Tail yields additional money. In between levels, players can park the truck in a minigame to earn more cash and upgrades for their truck, such as an improved horn.

== Ports ==
The first port of the game was released on the Dreamcast. Released by Sega, it is faithful to its arcade counterpart, but the voice actors for the characters were changed and it lacks the arcade's cross-country map loading screens. One of the selectable truckers in the arcade version, Nippon Maru, was now made available as an unlockable character. A split-screen multiplayer mode was added, allowing two players to race against each other. The game was released by Acclaim Entertainment on the PlayStation 2 and GameCube after Sega stopped making consoles and became a software based company.

== Reception ==
Reception

Aggregate score
Aggregator	Score		
Aggregator	Dreamcast	GameCube	PS2
Metacritic	67/100	52/100	61/100

Review scores
Publication	Score		
Publication	Dreamcast	GameCube	PS2
Edge	6/10	N/A	N/A
Electronic Gaming Monthly	6.33/10 (Note: Two critics of Electronic Gaming Monthly gave the Dreamcast version each a score of 6.5/10, and the other gave it 6/10.)	5.5/10	N/A
EP Daily	7/10	N/A	N/A
Famitsu	29/40	N/A	N/A
Game Informer	8.5/10	6/10	7.25/10
GameRevolution	C	N/A	N/A
GameSpot	6.5/10	4.6/10	6.3/10
GameSpy	6.5/10	68%	N/A
GameZone	N/A	4.5/10	6/10
IGN	7.8/10	5/10	5.5/10
Next Generation	3/5	N/A	N/A
Nintendo Power	N/A	2.8/5	N/A
Nintendo World Report	N/A	4/10	N/A
Official U.S. PlayStation Magazine	N/A	N/A	3/5
BBC Sport	N/A	N/A	72%
Maxim	6/10	N/A	N/A

The home versions of the game received "mixed or average reviews" according to the review aggregation website Metacritic. Jake The Snake of GamePro's July 2001 issue said of the Dreamcast version, "Your rig handles well, taking into account the weight of your load, and the driving action is great, with lots of mayhem as you run through cars and buildings. But while four levels were plenty for the quarter-munching arcade version of the game, they go by pretty fast at home; the four Score Attack courses and variable difficulty modes don't add much replay. So it'd be a good idea to rent this gem first to see if you'll still want to play after beating it." (Note: GamePro gave the Dreamcast version two 4.5/5 scores for graphics and control, and two 4/5 scores for sound and fun factor.) Ten issues later, however, Pong Sifu said of the GameCube version, "Is 18 Wheeler worth renting or playing at a friend's house? Sure. Does it warrant a $50 price tag? No way." (Note: GamePro gave the GameCube version two 2/5 scores for graphics and fun factor, 3.5/5 for sound, and 4.5/5 for control.) Rob Smolka of NextGen said that the former console version was "definitely worth a weekend rental, but its lack of online play and limited number of stages in the arcade game flatten its tires." In Japan, Famitsu gave the same console version 29 out of 40.

Also in Japan, Game Machine listed the arcade version as the second most successful dedicated arcade game of March 2000. Jon Thompson of AllGame gave the same arcade version three stars out of five and wrote that it "does have a fairly thorough scoring system that some will take to, but it lacks the gameplay that great arcade titles such as Crazy Taxi possess. That isn't to say it's a bad game: it's beautiful to behold and [it] will give you short term thrills, but it isn't one that you'll find yourself coming back to again and again after you've thrown down a couple of dollars playing it. In the end, it's a fun but short ride." He later gave the Dreamcast version two stars out of five, saying, "The game's graphics are crisp, although not as impressive as the arcade version. The music is fun, and the voices that come over the 'CB radio' are fairly entertaining. Still, the decent aural and visual package have little to do with the gameplay, and become dressing on a title with limited entertainment value. It is hard to even recommend this title for a rental -- those who wish to try it out are advised to find it at a local arcade instead." Scott Alan Marriott gave the GameCube version a similar score of two stars out of five, saying, "Without at least ten more routes in the main game, additional modes of play, bonus vehicles, or incentive to attain high scores other than for posterity, 18 Wheeler cannot be recommended for a purchase. The simple, straightforward nature of gameplay is over far too quickly and the appealing aspect of smashing into buildings and cars is largely neglected. In the end, this payload is too basic to keep players occupied for the long haul."

== See also ==
- Big Mutha Truckers
- 18 Wheels of Steel
- American Truck Simulator
- Crazy Taxi (video game)
