= Outtrigger (video game) =

1999 video game

- North American Dreamcast cover art
- Developer: Sega AM2
- Publisher: Sega
- Director: Hiroshi Kataoka
- Producer: Yu Suzuki
- Designer: Daichi Katagiri
- Programmer: Hideya Shibazaki
- Artist: Yasuo Kawagoshi
- Composer: Fumio Ito
- Platforms: Arcade, Dreamcast
- Release: Arcade: JP: November 1999; Dreamcast: NA: July 24, 2001; JP: August 2, 2001; EU: August 3, 2001
- Genres: First-person shooter Third-person shooter
- Modes: Single-player, multiplayer
- Arcade system: Sega NAOMI

Outtrigger (Note: Japanese: アウトトリガー, Hepburn: Autotorigā) is a first/third-person shooter video game developed by Sega for the Sega NAOMI arcade cabinet and the Dreamcast. The game was originally released in 1999 for the arcades and was later ported over to the Dreamcast in 2001. The player character of Outtrigger is a member of an anti-terrorist group, and can be chosen between default characters with different specialties or a custom character, and can utilize a number of power-ups. Reception to Outtrigger was generally positive, praising the gameplay and mechanics, though criticizing the removal of online play in the European version of the game.

== Gameplay ==
The plot of Outtrigger has the player working as a member of an anti-terrorist group. The player chooses one of four characters to play as. Each character has a weapons specialty, such as laser pulse rifles or sniper guns, as well as different attributes such as speed and jumping ability. Along with the default characters, there is an edit mode for players to create their own character by combining weapons of other characters. Each character is limited to three weapons: a general shooting weapon, an artillery-type explosive weapon, and grenades. The stages of the game have a number of power-ups, including thermography allowing players to see through walls, a plasma cannon that shoots a ball of energy which can bounce off walls, and a power-up icon that temporarily increases damage. The game also has a frag system where fragging an opponent gives the player an opportunity to collect a coin for an extra point, encouraging players to directly confront and frag opponents rather than picking off enemies from a secluded corner. A local multiplayer deathmatch mode is also available, along with online play except in Europe.

== Release and reception ==
Reviews (Dreamcast port)

Aggregate score
| Aggregator | Score |
|---|---|
| Metacritic | 73/100 |

Review scores
| Publication | Score |
|---|---|
| Consoles + | 86% |
| Edge | 7/10 |
| Electronic Gaming Monthly | 6.17/10 |
| Famitsu | 33/40 |
| Game Informer | 6.25/10 |
| GameRevolution | B− |
| GameSpot | 7/10 |
| GameSpy | 8/10 |
| IGN | 8.6/10 |
| Next Generation | 3/5 |
| Dreamcast Magazine | 92% |

Outtrigger was released in Japan as an arcade game. The arcade version used a trackball and joystick combination for player control. It was later ported to Dreamcast and given a multinational release, where supported online play for up to six players was added in. This function was taken out of the European version before release, but the split-screen multiplayer remains.

The Dreamcast version received "mixed or average" reviews according to the review aggregation website Metacritic. In Japan, Famitsu gave it a score of 33 out of 40. IGN praised the gameplay, calling it "refreshingly different", and the graphics, calling it "one of the best looking first person shooters," but criticizing the Dreamcast version's control setup. Edge stated that "AM2 has ingeniously incorporated typical Japanese game design and its arcade heritage" with FPS mechanics, resulting in "something quite refreshing" and "somewhat new territory." They praised Outtrigger for its "colourful, lively" environments, unique character personalities, fast action, and frag system, but criticized the removal of online multiplayer from the European version. Dreamcast Magazine stated that had the game included online play, they would have given it a score of 96%. They otherwise praised the game's graphics, gameplay, customizing options, and the multiplayer mode.

Writing for GameSpot, reviewer Jeff Gerstmann called the game fun and easy-to-play, but that fans of first-person shooter games would better enjoy competing games. Game Informer gave it a mixed review, nearly two months before the game was released Stateside. Rob Smolka of Next Generation called it "A good-looking, competent addition to the roster of Dreamcast shooters. Deduct a star, however, if you don't plan on being social."

== See also ==
- Virtua Cop 2
- Quake III Arena
- Unreal Tournament
