= Virtua Fighter 5 =

2006 video game

- Cover art of the original version, showing the main character Akira at the top and other characters below with Eileen and El Blaze in the center
- Developer: Sega AM2 (Note: Virtua Fighter 5 Ultimate Showdown / Virtua Fighter 5 R.E.V.O. (World Stage) co-developed with Ryu Ga Gotoku Studio)
- Publisher: Sega
- Directors: Makoto Osaki; Daichi Katagiri
- Producer: Hiroshi Kataoka
- Programmer: Hideki Tanaka
- Artist: Yasuo Kawagoshi
- Composers: Tatsutoshi Narita; Shinichi Goto; Fumio Ito
- Series: Virtua Fighter
- Platforms: Arcade; PlayStation 3; Xbox 360; PlayStation 4; Microsoft Windows; PlayStation 5; Xbox Series X/S; Nintendo Switch 2
- Release: July 12, 2006: Arcade; JP: July 12, 2006 Version A: JP: October 17, 2006 Version B: JP: December 14, 2006; WW: February 2007 Version C: JP: July 24, 2007 R: JP: July 24, 2008 R, Version A: JP: December 16, 2008 R, Version B: JP: May 21, 2009 R, Version C: JP: November 25, 2009 Final Showdown: JP: July 29, 2010 Final Showdown, Version A: JP: April 20, 2011 Final Showdown, Version B: JP: March 25, 2015 Ultimate Showdown: JP: June 2, 2021 Ultimate Showdown, Ver. 2.0: JP: December 16, 2024 PlayStation 3 Version B: JP: February 8, 2007; NA: February 20, 2007; EU: March 23, 2007 Final Showdown, Version A: WW: June 4, 2012 Xbox 360 Version C: EU: October 26, 2007; NA: October 30, 2007; JP: December 6, 2007 Final Showdown, Version A: WW: June 6, 2012 PlayStation 4 Ultimate Showdown: WW: June 1, 2021 Ultimate Showdown, Ver. 2.0.: WW: December 13, 2024 Windows R.E.V.O.: WW: January 28, 2025 PlayStation 5, Xbox Series X/S R.E.V.O.: WW: October 30, 2025 Nintendo Switch 2 R.E.V.O.: WW: March 26, 2026
- Genre: Fighting
- Modes: Single-player, multiplayer
- Arcade system: Sega Lindbergh (VF5 – Final Showdown); Sega ALLS UX (Ultimate Showdown)

Virtua Fighter 5 (Note: Japanese: バーチャファイター5, Hepburn: Bācha Faitā Faibu) is a 2006 fighting video game developed and published by Sega. It is the fifth installment of the Virtua Fighter series. The original version was released in July 2006 on the Sega Lindbergh arcade system board with a number of updates before home ports were released for PlayStation 3 and Xbox 360 in 2007. The first major update was Virtua Fighter 5 R (2008), followed by Virtua Fighter 5 Final Showdown (2010), with the latter ported to home systems in 2012. A version which also serves both remastered of Final Showdown and final update to the sub-series was released under the respective titles Virtua Fighter 5 Ultimate Showdown (Note: Known in Japan as Virtua Fighter esports) for PlayStation 4 and Japanese arcades in 2021, and Virtua Fighter 5 R.E.V.O. (later renamed to Virtua Fighter 5 R.E.V.O. World Stage) for Microsoft Windows, PlayStation 5 and Xbox Series X and S in 2025, and Nintendo Switch 2 in 2026.

== Gameplay ==
- Throw speed has been reduced, from eight frames to 12 frames. In addition, "Instant", or 0-frame throws re-appear from Virtua Fighter 3 in guaranteed throw situations (such as during an evade).
- Each stages’ rings have different shapes, weights and heights, rather than restrictedly square, nor have same ring size, as well as not all stages that have walls are at a same fence. Semi-open walls is not featured, but is replaced with single wall on certain stages.
- To encourage a more "moral" style of play, Sega introduced the Clash System: when initiated with the right timing, an attack can be canceled out with a throw, creating a clash and leaving both players at +0 frame advantage (neutral).
- Offensive Move: pressing "Punch + Kick + Guard" during an evade will initiate an angled forward dash. In addition, pressing "Punch" or "Kick" during OM will initiate an attack which can lead to side or back stagger or crumple, leading to a guaranteed combo opportunity.
- Wall Break only occurs when knocking the opponent who is behind breakable walls with higher attacks, such as Akira's Tetsuzanko.
- Only in R and later updates, it features a new "Bound" System that puts juggled opponent to the ground to extend juggle combos. Each characters has both higher and lower "Bound" moves. Juggle combo from high to low ground bound moves against juggled opponent is possible, depends on the juggled opponent's weight affecting the juggle height, and the stage types. To connect high bound move to low bound move, must start with using high bound move, then use a juggle move to lower bound move. Eg.: Akira's combo by using Koboku (a high bound move) twice for a starter combo, then juggle with Chusui to Hekisho (a low bound move) against a lighter or normal weight opponent. Although there is possibility for the fighters like Jean can juggle combo using two high bound moves.
- A real-time commentary feature was implemented for both English and Japanese languages.
- The Xbox 360 version introduced online support via Xbox Live, which allowed two players from around the world to battle over the Internet. Developers have also suggested that the PS3 version could also be online-enabled in the form of a downloadable patch. This was later discounted by Sega's Jay Boor, who said: "at this time SEGA has no plans to release a patch for the PS3 version of Virtua Fighter 5."
- Version C of Virtua Fighter 5 was used for the 360 version which fixed up some gameplay issues, while the PS3 version used version B.
- Different items are available in the Xbox 360 port of the game in Quest mode, as it is based upon Version C.
- On January 16, 2008, the Xbox 360 version received an update, which made improvements and changes to online play and quest mode.

=== Characters ===
Virtua Fighter 5 launched with 17 playable characters plus the boss character Dural, with two additional characters being added in its R revision, comprising every character in the series up to that point. Newcomers are marked below in bold:

- Akira Yuki
- Aoi Umenokoji
- Brad Burns
- Dural (Note: DLC in Ultimate Showdown and R.E.V.O.. Also banned in official Sega tournaments)
- **Eileen**
- **El Blaze**
- Goh Hinogami
- Jacky Bryant
- **Jean Kujo** (Note: Added in Virtua Fighter 5 R)
- Jeffry McWild
- Kage-Maru
- Lau Chan
- Lei-Fei
- Lion Rafale
- Pai Chan
- Sarah Bryant
- Shun Di
- Taka-Arashi
- Vanessa Lewis
- Wolf Hawkfield

== Plot ==
All of the invitations for the Fifth World Fighting Tournament have been sent. And now, the 17 best fighters in the world begin their final phases of preparation. They must learn from their past mistakes and perfect every aspect of their mind, body, and soul – for there is no room for mistakes in this competition. Most of them are unaware that J6, the organization funding the tournament, has even more sinister ulterior motives for the contest and the syndicate's top secret Dural program is already underway. In the organization's quest for world domination, the scientists at J6 are creating the ultimate fighting machine with human features. The said Dural whom Kage-Maru fought and defeated in the Fourth World Fighting Tournament was not his mother, Tsukikage, leading J6 to kidnap Vanessa to further their mass production on the Dural project. She was able to escape with the help of an insider, but not before they captured her combat data and transferred it to the new advanced Dural model named V-Dural.

J6 is determined to find out the traitor that released Vanessa and see if V-Dural is ready to defeat the world's best fighters. Along the way, other than sending their Japanese judoka, Goh Hinogami to participate once again, J6 also deploys their Japanese-French karateka, Jean Kujo, who was once Lion Rafale's childhood friend and rival to enter there too. The Fifth World Fighting Tournament will reveal both.

== Versions ==
The first location tests took place on November 26, 2005 leading to the official release on July 12, 2006, in Japanese arcades. An export version, based on Version B, was released to arcades outside Japan in February 2007.

The revised Version B update was released in Japanese arcades in December 2006 and was ported to the PlayStation 3, for which it was released February 2007 and was a launch title for the console's European release in March 2007. Version C was released in Japanese arcades in July 2007 and was ported to the Xbox 360, for which it was released October 2007 in Europe and in North America. The Xbox 360 version would allow users to compete online via Xbox Live, a feature that was not available on the PlayStation 3 version.

While Japanese arcades received the first major update Virtua Fighter 5 R, the Xbox 360, PlayStation 3 and arcades would get the second update Virtua Fighter 5 Final Showdown.

An enhanced remaster of Final Showdown, titled Virtua Fighter 5 Ultimate Showdown was released worldwide for PlayStation 4 on June 1, 2021, and Japanese arcades on June 2, 2021. This version was later ported to Windows as Virtua Fighter 5 R.E.V.O. on January 28, 2024, later renamed to Virtua Fighter 5 R.E.V.O. World Stage to coincide with PlayStation 5 and Xbox Series X and S release on October 30, 2025, with Nintendo Switch 2 version will be released on a later date.

=== PlayStation 3 version ===
The PlayStation 3 port is based around the older Version B revision. On January 16, 2008, Sega confirmed online features will not be added to the PlayStation 3 version due to the Version B's technical limitations.

=== Xbox 360 version ===
The Xbox 360 port of Virtua Fighter 5, known as Virtua Fighter 5 Online in North America and Virtua Fighter 5 Live Arena in Japan, benefits from the additions and refinements that have been made to the Version C arcade revision, including online play and an online update ability.

=== Virtua Fighter 5 R ===
On February 14, 2008, at the AOU Amusement Expo, Sega AM2 announced a revision to Virtua Fighter 5 known as Virtua Fighter 5 R. This new version was released for the arcades on July 24, 2008, and features brand new stages as well as a new character named Jean Kujo, who practices Karate. The sumo wrestler Taka-Arashi also returns, making his first appearance since Virtua Fighter 3 and bringing the fighter count up to 20 (counting Dural).

Version B of Virtua Fighter 5 R was officially released in Japanese arcades on May 21, 2009. This version featured changes in the animations of moves on all the characters, as well as changes to enhance the gameplay modes and an improved camera system.

Version C was released on November 25, 2009. However, this particular version mainly added new team items for the character's outfits.

=== Final Showdown ===
On February 18, 2010, Sega released a trailer for a second and final revision called Virtua Fighter 5 Final Showdown. This update for the Sega Lindbergh arcade system debuted at the 2010 AOU Expo, and features new character costumes and new animations. The game was officially released in Japanese arcades on July 29, 2010. Version A of Final Showdown was released on April 20, 2011, in Japanese arcades. It was announced at Gamescom 2011 that Final Showdown would be coming to PlayStation 3 on June 5, 2012 and Xbox 360 on June 6, 2012, complete with online play for both platforms. The game was released in downloadable format. Within a week, Final Showdown surpassed Japanese sale goals expectations. After two weeks, the game reached over 300,000 global downloads.

Version B of Final Showdown was released on March 25, 2015, in Japanese arcades, and removed Internet functionality. This version of the game is playable in the in-game arcades in several of the Like A Dragon games, including Yakuza 6, Judgment and Yakuza: Like a Dragon.

The Xbox 360 version of Final Showdown was later made available on Xbox One on September 15, 2016, via backward compatibility, also becoming available on Xbox Series X/S.

=== Ultimate Showdown ===
An enhanced remaster of the game, titled Virtua Fighter 5 Ultimate Showdown in Western and Asian markets and Virtua Fighter esports in Japan, was teased at Tokyo Game Show 2020 Online in September 2020 as Virtua Fighter x esports Project and announced in May 2021, in celebration of Sega's 60th anniversary. Co-developed by Ryu Ga Gotoku Studio and Sega AM2, Ultimate Showdown is built on the Dragon Engine used in the Like a Dragon series, and features updated graphics, new background music, a new user interface, a new opening cinematic and new online features. However, it does not include the Type E or normal Type S costumes from the previous home release, nor is Dural available as a playable character. The remaster was released worldwide for PlayStation 4 on June 1, 2021.

Free-to-play downloads were offered to PlayStation Plus subscribers free of charge for a limited time from June 1, 2021 to August 1, 2021, resulting in the game being downloaded more than 10 million times.

Ultimate Showdown currently offers three downloadable content packs. The first DLC pack is the "Legendary Pack", which includes all background music tracks from the previous Virtua Fighter games; various costumes and items for character customization; the Type C costume sets from the previous versions; and cosmetic options based on the original Virtua Fighter, including an alternate health bar design, Jacky's classic stage, and low-polygon 3D models for each character. The second content pack, the "Yakuza Series Collaboration Pack", adds the Type D costume sets from the previous versions, along with Like A Dragon-themed costumes and music tracks, including the arranged music of Virtua Fighter 3; it was announced on December 4, 2021, and released on December 8. The third DLC pack contains costumes, cosmetics, and music from Bandai Namco's Tekken 7; it was announced on March 20, 2022 after Virtua Fighter's Challenge Cup Season 0, and released on June 1, 2022.

=== R.E.V.O. ===
A Windows port of Ultimate Showdown, titled Virtua Fighter 5 R.E.V.O., was announced in November 2024, and was released on January 28, 2025. The port adds support for 4K visuals, rollback netcode, and additional game balance changes besides returning the movesets from original Virtua Fighter 5, as well as a new English arrangement version of "Ai wa Tsuienai", entitled "Burning Soul", performed by Takenobu Mitsuyoshi, as the version's main theme song. A 5-day open beta was from December 13–17, 2024, with a Version 2.0 update containing R.E.V.O.'s balance changes released for Ultimate Showdown the same day on PS4 and on December 16 for arcades. Additionally, R.E.V.O. includes 30th anniversary editions which contain the first two DLC set packs, including the anniversary variants of Costume S set for all characters, as well as the music tracks which were neither being released nor used in previous Virtua Fighter games. The Tekken DLC set pack remains available for separate purchase, due to being a third-party licensed pack. Those who pre-ordered R.E.V.O. received three customized items based on Sega's Mega Drive, Saturn and Dreamcast consoles.

=== R.E.V.O. World Stage ===
On May 11, 2025, R.E.V.O. was announced to be coming to the PlayStation 5, Xbox Series X/S, and Nintendo Switch 2, with cross-play and rollback netcode supported across all platforms including Windows. The console versions were officially unveiled as Virtua Fighter 5 R.E.V.O. World Stage during Evolution Championship Series (EVO) 2025 in August, and launched on PlayStation 5 and Xbox Series X/S on October 30, 2025, while the Nintendo Switch 2 version was launched on March 26, 2026.

The namesake in World Stage is a new single-player campaign mode where players will face off against CPU-controlled opponents modeled off the data of real-life players in the game's competitive scene. A closed beta took place in early September and October 2025 for PlayStation 5 and Xbox Series X/S users, who were able to test the online multiplayer and cross-play functions with each other and existing Windows users. R.E.V.O. on Windows was also updated to World Stage through a free patch distributed when World Stage launched on consoles, while owners of Ultimate Showdown on PlayStation 4 can purchase World Stage on PlayStation 5 at a discounted price. Additionally, Dural was added via DLC, but is excluded from being used in official Sega tournaments. During his interview with Automaton, Aoki confirmed that Costume E Set for all characters are unlockable in World Stage Mode, with their original color palettes are immediately being unlocked upon entering the mode.

The game was nominated for "Best Fighting Game" at The Game Awards 2025, but did not win.

== Reception ==
Reception

Aggregate score
Aggregator	Score
Metacritic	PS3: 85/100; X360: 89/100; Final Showdown; PS3: 82/100; X360: 81/100; Ultimate Showdown; PS4: 77/100; R.E.V.O. PC: 75/100

Review scores
Publication	Score
1Up.com	A+
Electronic Gaming Monthly	9.7/10
Eurogamer	9/10
Famitsu	34/40
Game Informer	9/10
GameSpot	8.1/10
GameTrailers	88/100
IGN	PS3: 8.8/10; X360: 9/10
Official Xbox Magazine (UK)	9/10
Gamer.tm	9/10

The game reached number seven in the UK sales chart. The game received significant critical acclaim from most reviewers. In 2009, Edge ranked the game No. 24 on its list of "The 100 Best Games To Play Today" (the highest-rated 3D fighter on the list), stating: "One of gaming's great myths is that VF is inaccessible to all but the initiated. It takes care of frame-counting junkies, of course, but the core of AM2's series is a beautiful balance of attack, block and counter-attack that anyone can enjoy. Each new entry refines, making that solid animation even more seamless and introducing new characters that seem like they were always there."

Final Showdown received a 9/10 from Eurogamer, which called it "deeper than any of its peers." Edge favorably compared Final Showdown with Street Fighter IV, Marvel vs. Capcom 3, Soulcalibur V and Mortal Kombat, noting: "Its prudence, that veil of simplicity masking a system of astonishing possibility and depth, makes it one of the purest fighting games on the market today." The game was featured in 1001 Video Games You Must Play Before You Die, with journalist Richard Stanton stating: "No matter how good the latest Street Fighter or Tekken is, they'll still be undisciplined teenagers compared to Virtua Fighter's cool, mature mastery of fighting."

The game was nominated for "Best Fighting Game" at The Game Awards 2025.
