= Sega Network Taisen Mahjong MJ =

Sega Net Mahjong MJ
- Arcade flyer for the first Sega Net Mahjong MJ game released in 2002
- Developer: Sega AM2
- Publisher: Sega
- Release: Arcade: JP: 2002; Sega Networks Taisen Mahjong MJ2: JP: 2003; Sega Networks Taisen Mahjong MJ3: JP: 2005; Sega Networks Taisen Mahjong MJ4: JP: 2008; Sega Networks Taisen Mahjong MJ5: JP: 2011; Sega Networks Taisen Mahjong MJ5R: JP: 2013; Sega Networks Taisen Mahjong MJ Arcade: JP: 2017; Microsoft Windows: JP: 2013; iOS, Android: JP: 2013; WW: 2020
- Genre: Arcade video game
- Modes: Single-player, multiplayer
- Arcade system: Sega Naomi; Sega Lindbergh; Sega RingEdge

Sega Net Mahjong MJ is a mahjong arcade game developed by Sega AM2 and released by Sega. The first version for arcades was released in July 2002 for the Sega NAOMI 2 arcade system. It featured online features with ranking, customization and recording your play history, using the experience that AM2 had developed from Virtua Fighter 4 and VF.NET. It received numerous updates and sequels since then.

Sega Net Mahjong MJ2, the first sequel, switched arcade boards to the Sega Chihiro, and brought in nationwide online play. Sega Net Mahjong MJ3 was released and expanded the ruleset. Sega Net Mahjong MJ4 switched arcade boards to the Sega Lindbergh, and a training mode was added. Sega Net Mahjong MJ5 was on the Sega RingEdge and had multi-touch touchscreens. It was updated as Sega Network Taisen Mahjong MJ5R Evolution.

Eleven years later after launch of the first game, Sega Net Mahjong MJ was ported outside of the arcade with a version on PC and mobile. A full English localization of the mobile version was also released, however was shut down. English and Traditional Chinese languages were available in the Japanese version, but were later dropped, besides the commentary. It was also available on the free to play companion app of Yakuza 0 on PlayStation Vita.

A new version for arcades was also released, called Sega Net Mahjong MJ Arcade.
