= Shining Force Cross =

2009 video game

- Arcade flyer
- Developer: Sega AM2
- Publisher: Sega
- Composers: Fumio Ito; Kazuki Takagi; Keisuke Tsukahara; Makito Nomiya; Megumi Takano; Mieko Isa; Yasuyuki Nagata; Keisuke Tsukahara; Megumi Takano
- Series: Shining
- Release: Arcade: JP: 2009; Shining Force Cross Raid: JP: 2010; Shining Force Cross Elysion: JP: 2012; Shining Force Cross Exlesia: JP: 2013; Shining Force Cross Exlesia Zenith: JP: 2014
- Genre: Action role-playing game
- Arcade system: Sega RingEdge

Shining Force Cross is an action role-playing game developed by Sega AM2 and published by Sega on the Sega RingEdge arcade platform. It is part of the Shining series from Sega. It is developed by the same development team as Quest of D. It was only released in Japan in arcades and received no port of any kind.

It was updated four times across its lifespan, with subtitles Raid, Elysion, Exlesia and Exlesia Zenith. The online support ended on November 1, 2016.

Six official soundtracks were released from all the various version of the game.

== Gameplay ==
The game follows the same format as Quest of D, however with the difference that there are no physical trading cards to collect.

With Raid, the game was updated so it can be played with up 6 players instead of 4. From Elysion onwards the game can be played up to 8 players in the special elysion mode where the players fight against enemies in a vast field. Classes available are human, half beast, elf, birdling and dark race. Weapons that can be wielded are sword, magic gun, hammer, flail, knuckle, and dagger as well as magic weapons and magic armor. The gameplay style differs heavily depending on which weapon is used. Characters can be customised in appearance, voice, height and gender. Except for gender, everything can be changed at any point in the game.

== Reception ==
Within one month, nearly 2,400 Shining Force Cross machines had been sold to arcade operators by December 31, 2009.
