= Ghost Squad (video game) =

2004 video game

- Developers: Sega AM2; Polygon Magic (Wii port)
- Publisher: Sega
- Platforms: Arcade, Wii
- Release: Arcade; 2004; Wii: JP: October 23, 2007; NA: November 20, 2007; EU: January 18, 2008; AU: January 24, 2008
- Genre: Rail shooter
- Modes: Single-player, multiplayer
- Arcade system: Sega Chihiro

Ghost Squad Evolution
- Developer: Sega AM2
- Publisher: Sega
- Platform: Arcade
- Release: 2007
- Genre: Rail shooter
- Modes: Single-player, Multiplayer
- Arcade system: Sega Lindbergh

Ghost Squad and Ghost Squad: Evolution are light gun rail shooter arcade games developed and published by Sega. A home console version of the original Ghost Squad was released for the Nintendo Wii in 2007. A sequel, Operation GHOST, was released in arcades in 2012.

== Ghost Squad (arcade) ==
Sega released Ghost Squad for the arcade in 2004. Ghost Squad features a simulated IR light gun shaped similarly to the standard-issue weapon the game's protagonists use. This light gun is intended to function realistically: it features a working fire selector switch, a stock, force-feedback recoil, and iron sights. To ensure that the light gun fires accurately, a 20-second "calibration" mode is provided in which the game adjusts for any jostling or damage to the rifle's light-emitting components.

Ghost Squad features different weapons, each with its firing and reload properties (i.e. long shot splash, long reload time) which affect its difficulty of use. Ghost Squad features three semi non-linear levels with adjustable difficulty and branching choices (dubbed "Tactical Decisions"), ranging from the jungle, a government-restricted villa, and inside an Air Force One flight. There are many sub-activities in the game, such as defusing bombs and throwing grenades to disable armor, which are accomplished via the secondary "Action" trigger on the gun's foregrip.

=== Arcade version data features ===
The arcade version of Ghost Squad uses "IC Cards" to save the player's customized character data, score, and provide the player with experience points, new outfits, new weapons, and increased rank. The card is available for players to purchase at some arcades. The card allows the player a maximum of 100 games and sixteen levels of difficulty. After 100 games the card must be recharged by purchasing a new card. The game also utilizes an internet ranking system, that is accessed when using a password provided by the game.

Most Ghost Squad cabinets in the United States do not have card slots. However, players have immediate access to four costumes, four guns, and the first four mission levels.

== Ghost Squad: Evolution (arcade) ==
Ghost Squad Evolution is the arcade follow-up to the original Ghost Squad. It was developed and published by Sega and released in 2007.

In Ghost Squad: Evolution the player is a member of Alpha Unit, or members of the “Ghost Squad”, an unofficial unit of the anti-terrorist group, Multi-Operation-Program (M.O.P.). Non-playable characters include fellow M.O.P. members consisting of the Commander, who provides radio backup and pertinent advice to the player, along with the Bravo and Charlie Units who assist the player in suppressing the terrorist threat.

The submachine gun can be set from single shot, to 3 burst shot to automatic fire as well as special effects to suit the situation such as Night Vision, Flash Light for the mounted gun, and Scope for the sniper rifle. The gun also features an action button which is used to pull off special moves like hand-to-hand combat, as well as recoil effects on every shot fired.

Each mission contains multiple routes for the player to choose. Special events occur throughout the game depending on the route chosen, such as securing hostages, bomb removal, or providing friendly cover fire. The game is broken into 3 missions with 16 total difficulty levels. All 16 can be selected from the beginning. There are 14 costumes available for character customization, however, the costumes have no effect on gameplay. There are 25 different weapons.

== Ghost Squad (Wii) ==
Sega published the Polygon Magic developed Wii port of Ghost Squad in Japan on October 25, 2007, and in the U.S. on November 20, 2007. It uses the Wii Zapper as a multi-purpose tool to allow players easy control of targeting enemies, defusing bombs, and detaining hostages. The port also virtually emulates the original arcade version's IC Card progression system as autosaved player profiles stored in the Wii's system memory, minus the card's 100-game limit.

Ghost Squad takes advantage of the Wii Remote's pointer functionality, the nunchuk, and the Wii Zapper giving players controller flexibility. In addition, the game features a pointer calibration mode, enabling players to use line-of-sight aiming and fire precisely where the Wii Remote is pointed. The player has the option to turn off the on-screen pointer for more points.

Exclusive to the Wii conversion of the game are four-player support, and an online high score leaderboard via the Nintendo Wi-Fi Connection.

== Reception ==
Ghost Squad for the Wii has a score of 69 on the review aggregation website Metacritic. IGN gave it a 7.5, remarking that "most of what made Ghost Squad fun in the arcades is still retained though, as there's a huge emphasis on weapon management and mid-level missions."

Writing in 2022 for Retro Gamer Ashley Day placed Ghost Squad in the top spot in his list of the Top 25 Light-Gun Games of all time, pointing to its branching-path levels, high score challenges and character progression as lending it a replayability unmatched in the genre.

== See also ==
- The House of the Dead 2 & 3 Return
