= List of arcade video games: K =

This is a list of arcade video games organized alphabetically by name. It does not include PC or console games unless they were also released in video arcades. See Lists of video games for related lists.

Title	Alternate Title(s)	Year	Manufacturer	Genre(s)	Max. Players	PCB Model
Kabuki-Z	—	1988	Taito	Fighting	2	
Kageki	—	1988	Taito	Fighting	2	
Kaisen Channel Mars TV	—	1999	Sega			
Kaiser Knuckle	Global Champion	1994	Taito	Fighting	2	
Kaitei Takara Sagashi	—	1980	Namco	Action	2	
Kaiun Quiz	—	1999	Namco			
Kamikaze Cabbie	Yellow Cab	1984	Data East	Driving	2	
Kangaroo	—	1982	Sun Electronics	Platformer	2	
Kankoku Hanafuda Go-Stop	—	2001	Visco			
Kaos	—	1981	Game Plan	Platformer	2	
Karaoke Quiz Intro Don Don!	—	1996	Sunsoft			Sega ST-V
Karate Blazers	—	1991	Video System	Fighting	2	
Karate Champ	Karate Dou^{JP}	1984	Data East	Fighting	2	
Karate Champ Player vs Player version	—	1984	Data East	Fighting	2	
Karian Cross	—	1997	Deniam			
Karnov	—	1987	Data East	Platformer	2	
Karnov's Revenge	—	1994	Data East		2	NeoGeo
Kart Duel	—	2000	Namco			
Karous	—	2006	Milestone	Scrolling shooter	1	
Kasino '89	—	1989	SFC s.r.l.			
Keirin Ou	—	1987	Excellent System			
Keith Courage in Alpha Zones	—	1989	Hudson Soft			
Ken Sei Mogura: Street Fighter II	—	1994	Capcom			
Ken-Go	Lightning Swords^{EU}	1991	Irem			
Ketsui: Kizuna Jigoku Tachi	—	2003	CAVE	Scrolling shooter	2	
The Key of Avalon: The Wizard Master	—	2003	Hitmaker			
The Key of Avalon 2: Eutaxy Commandment	—	2004	Hitmaker			
The Key of Avalon 2.5: War of the Key	—	2005	Hitmaker			
The Key of Avalon Ver.1.10	—	2003	Hitmaker			
The Key of Avalon Ver.1.20: Summon the New Monsters	—	2003	Hitmaker			
The Key of Avalon Ver.1.30: Chaotic Sabbat	—	2004	Hitmaker			
Keyboardmania	—	2000	Konami	Music	2	
Keyboardmania 2ndMIX	—	2000	Konami	Music	2	
Keyboardmania 3rdMIX	—	2000	Konami	Music	2	
Kick and Run	—	1986	Taito			
Kick Goal	—	1995	TCH			
Kick Man	—	1981	Midway		2	
Kick & Kick	—	2001	Konami	Sports	2	Konami System 573
Kick Off - Jaleco Cup	—		Jaleco	Sports		
Kick Rider	—	1984	Universal			
Kick Start Wheelie King	—	1984	Taito			
Kid Niki: Radical Ninja	Kaiketsu Yanchamaru	1986	Irem	Platformer	2	
Kid's Horehore Daisakusen	—	1987	Nichibutsu	Action	2	
Kidou Senshi Gundam 0079: Card Builder	—	2005	Namco Bandai			
Kidou Senshi Gundam 0083: Card Builder	—	2007	Namco Bandai			
Kidou Senshi SD Gundam: Psycho Salamander no Kyoui oh	—	1991	Banpresto			
Kidou Senshi Gundam: Renpou vs. Zeon	—	2001	Capcom			NAOMI cart.
Kidou Senshi Gundam: Renpou vs. Zeon DX	—	2001	Capcom			
Kiki Ippatsu Mayumi-chan	—	1988	Victory			
KiKi KaiKai	—	1986	Taito	Multidirectional shooter	1	
Killer Comet	—	1980	Centuri			
Killer Instinct	—	1994	Nintendo	Fighting	2	
Killer Instinct 2	—	1996	Nintendo	Versus fighting	2	
The Killing Blade	—	1998	International Games System	Versus fighting	2	
The Killing Blade Plus	—	2005	International Games System	Versus fighting	2	
King & Balloon	—	1980	Namco	Fixed shooter	2	
The King of Dragons		1991	Capcom	Beat 'em up		
The King of Fighters '94	—	1994	SNK	Versus fighting	2	NeoGeo
The King of Fighters '95	—	1995	SNK	Versus fighting	2	NeoGeo
The King of Fighters '96	—	1996	SNK	Versus fighting	2	NeoGeo
The King of Fighters '97	—	1997	SNK	Versus fighting	2	NeoGeo
The King of Fighters '98: The Slugfest	—	1998	SNK	Versus fighting	2	NeoGeo
The King of Fighters '98: Ultimate Match	—	2008	SNK	Versus fighting	2	
The King of Fighters '99: Millennium Battle	—	1999	SNK	Versus fighting	2	NeoGeo
The King of Fighters 2000	—	2000	SNK	Versus fighting	2	NeoGeo
The King of Fighters 2001	—	2001	SNK	Versus fighting	2	NeoGeo
The King of Fighters 2002	—	2002	SNK	Versus fighting	2	NeoGeo
The King of Fighters 2002: Unlimited Match	—	2009	SNK	Versus fighting	2	
The King of Fighters 2003	—	2003	SNK	Versus fighting	2	NeoGeo
The King of Fighters NeoWave	—	2004	SNK Playmore	Versus fighting	2	
The King of Fighters XI	—	2005	SNK Playmore	Versus fighting	2	
The King of Fighters XII	—	2009	SNK Playmore	Versus fighting	2	
The King of Route 66	—	2002	Sega	Racing	1	
King of the Monsters	—	1991	SNK	Versus fighting	2	
King of the Monsters 2	—	1992	SNK	Versus fighting	2	
King Pin	—	1983	American Communication Laboratories			
Kingdom Grand Prix	—	1994	8ing/Raizing	Scrolling shooter, Racing	2	
Kinnikuman Muscle Grand Prix	—	2006	Banpresto			
Kinnikuman Muscle Grand Prix 2	—	2007	Banpresto			
Kira Kira Gomoku Narabe Renju Kizoku	—	1994	Visco			
Kirameki Star Road: Intro Club	—	1997	Taito			
Kisekae Hanafuda	—	1995	I'Max			
Kisekae Mahjong	—	1995	I'Max			
Kitten Kaboodle	Nyan Nyan Panic	1988	Konami	Action	2	
Kizuna Encounter	—	1996	SNK	Fighting	2	
Kkot Bi Nyo Special	—	1997	Shinwhajin			
Klad	—	19??	Photon System			
Klax	—	1989	Atari Games	Puzzle	2	
KlonDike+	—	1999	Eolith			
Knights In Armor	—	1976	Project Support Engineering			
Knights of the Round	—	1991	Capcom	Beat 'em up	3	CPS1
Knights of Valour	—	1999	International Games System	Beat 'em up	4	
Knights of Valour 2	—	2000	International Games System	Beat 'em up	4	
Knights of Valour 2: New Legend	—	2008	International Games System	Beat 'em up	4	
Knights of Valour 2: Nine Dragons	—	2001	International Games System	Beat 'em up	4	
Knights of Valour 3	—	2011	International Games System	Beat 'em up	4	
Knights of Valour 3 HD	—	2011	International Games System	Beat 'em up	4	
Knights of Valour Plus	—	1999	International Games System	Beat 'em up	4	
Knights of Valour Superheroes	—	1999	International Games System	Beat 'em up	4	
Knights of Valour Superheroes Plus	—	2004	International Games System	Beat 'em up	4	
Knights of Valour: The Seven Spirits	—	2003	International Games System	Beat 'em up	4	
Knuckle Bash	—	1993	Toaplan	Beat 'em up		
Knuckle Heads	—	1992	Namco	Beat 'em up		
Knuckle Joe	—	1985	Seibu Kaihatsu / Taito (license)	Beat 'em up	2	
KO Punch	—	1981	Sega			
Kodai Oja Kyoryu King	—	2005	Sega			
Kodai Oja Kyoryu King: D-Team VS. the Alpha Fortress	—	2008	Sega			
Kodai Oja Kyoryu King: Operation Dinosaur Rescue	—	2006	Sega			
Kodai Ouja Kyouryuu King - Mezame yo! Arata-naru Chikara!!	—	2008	Sega			
KOF Sky Stage	—	2010	SNK Playmore			
Koi Koi Part 2	—	1982	Kiwako			
Koi Koi Shimasyo	—	1995	Visco			
Koi Koi Shimasyo 2: Super Real Hanafuda	—	1997	Visco			
Kokontouzai Eto Monogatari	—					
Kollon	—	2003	Taito			Taito G-Net
Konami GT	Konami RF2: Red Fighter	1985	Konami	Racing	1	
Konami's Open Golf Championship	Golfing Greats 2^{JP}	1994	Konami	Sports	2	
Konami's Ping Pong	—	1985	Konami	Sports	2	
Konek-Gorbunok	—	1988	Terminal			
Kono e Tako	—	2003	Mitchell Corporation			
Koro Koro Quest	—	1999	Takumi			
Kosodate Quiz My Angel	—	1996	Namco			
Kosodate Quiz My Angel 2	—	1997	Namco			
Kosodate Quiz My Angel 3	—	1998	Namco			
Kot-Rybolov	—	1988	Terminal			
Kotoba no Puzzle: Mojipittan	—	2001	Namco			
The Koukou Yakyuu	—	1985	Alpha Denshi			
Koutetsu Yousai Strahl	—	1992	UPL	Scrolling shooter	2	
Kozmik Krooz'r	—	1983	Bally Midway	Multidirectional shooter	2	
Kozure Ookami	—	1987	Nichibutsu			
Kram	—	1982	Taito	Maze	2	
Krazy Bowl	—	1994	American Sammy	Sports		
Krull	—	1983	Gottlieb	Adventure	2	
Kuai Le Xi You Ji	—	200?	IGS	Mahjong video game		
Kung-Fu Master	Spartan X ^{JP}	1984	Irem	Beat 'em up	2	
Kung-Fu Taikun	—	1984	Seibu Kaihatsu			
Kunio no Nekketsu Toukyuu Densetsu	—	1996	Technos	Sports	2	NeoGeo
Kurikinton	—	1988	Taito	Beat 'em up	2	
Kurukuru Chameleon	—	2006	Starfish-SD			NAOMI GD-ROM
Kurukuru Fever	—	2002	Aruze			
Kusa Yakyuu	—	1985	Taito			
Kyros	Kyros no Yakata	1987	Alpha Denshi		2	
Kyūkai Dōchūki	—	1990	Namco	Sports	2	
Kyuukyoku no Othello	—	1990	Success			
