= List of arcade video games: O =

This is a list of arcade video games organized alphabetically by name. It does not include PC or console games unless they were also released in video arcades. See Lists of video games for related lists.

Title	Alternate Title(s)	Year	Manufacturer	Genre(s)	Max. Players	PCB Model
The Ocean Hunter	—	1998	Sega	Shooting gallery	2	
Odeon Twister	—	1995	CD Express		1	
Odeon Twister 2	—	1995	CD Express		1	
Off Beat Racer!	—	1998	SNK	Racing	1	
Off Road Challenge	—	1997	Midway	Racing	1	
Off Road Thunder	—	1999	Midway	Racing	1	
Off The Wall (Atari)	—	1991	Atari Games	Breakout	2	
Off The Wall (Bally Sente)	—	1984	Bally Sente		1	
Office Yeo In Cheon Ha	—	2001	Danbi System		1	
Oh My God!	—	1993	Atlus	Puzzle	2	
Oh! Paipee	—	1989	Nichibutsu			
Oishii Puzzle Wa Irimasen Ka	—	1989	Sunsoft	Puzzle	2	
Ojanko Club	—	1986	V-System	Mahjong video game		
Ojanko High School	—	1988	V-System	Mahjong video game		
Ojanko Yakata: Shobatsuki Mahjong sen	—	1986	V-System	Mahjong video game		
Ojanko Yakata 2bankan: Shobatsuki Mahjong sen	—	1987	V-System	Mahjong video game		
Oli-Boo-Chu	—	1982	Irem		2	
Ollie King	—	2004	Smilebit			
Omega	—	1986	Nihon System			
Omega Fighter	—	1989	UPL	Scrolling shooter	2	
Omega Fighter Special	—	1989	UPL	Scrolling shooter	2	
Omega Race	—	1982	Midway	Multidirectional shooter	1	
Omotesandou	—	1989	Anime TEC			
One + Two	—	1997	Barko			
One Shot One Kill	—		Playmark	Shooting gallery	2	
Oo-edo Fight	Blood Warrior	1994	Kaneko			
Oozumou	—	1984	Data East			DECO
Opa Opa	—	1987	Sega			
Operation Thunder Hurricane	—	1997	Konami			
Operation Thunderbolt	—	1988	Taito	Shooting gallery	2	
Operation Tiger	—	1998	Taito	Shooting gallery	2	
Operation Tiger: Second Mission	—	1998	Taito	Shooting gallery	2	
Operation Wolf	—	1987	Taito	Shooting gallery	2	
Operation Wolf 3	—	1994	Taito	Shooting gallery	2	
Orange Club: Maru-hi Kagai Jugyou	—	1988	Daiichi Denshi			
Orbit	—	1978	Atari	Multi-directional shooter	2	
Orbitron	—	1982	Signatron USA			
Orbs	—	1994	American Sammy			
Ordyne	—	1988	Namco	Scrolling shooter	2	
Oriental Legend	—	1997	International Games System	Beat 'em up	4	
Oriental Legend 2	—	2007	International Games System	Beat 'em up	4	
Oriental Legend Special	—	1998	International Games System	Beat 'em up	4	
Oriental Legend Super	—	1998	International Games System	Beat 'em up	4	
Oshaberi Macha Monoshiri Quiz	—	1983	Logitec Company			
Oshare Majo Love and Berry	Love And Berry: 1st-2nd Collection/ Love and Berry: Dress Up and Dance	2004	Sega			NAOMI cart.
Osman	Cannon Dancer	1996	Mitchell Corporation	Platformer	1	
Otenami Haiken	—	1999	Success			Taito G-Net
Otenami Haiken Final	—	2005	Success			Taito G-Net
Otenki Kororin: Weather Tales	—	2001	Takumi			Taito G-Net
Othello	—	1984	Success			
Othello Derby	—	1995	Sunwise			
Othello Shiyouyo	—	1998	Success			Sega ST-V
Otogizoushi Urashima Mahjong	—	1989	UPL			
Otomedius	—	2007	Konami	Scrolling shooter		
Otona no Mahjong	—	1988	Apple			
The Outfoxies	—	1995	Namco	Shoot'em up/ Fighting game	2	
Outlaw	—	1976	Atari	Shooter	1	
Out Run	—	1986	Sega AM2	Racing	1	
OutRun 2	—	2003	Sega AM2	Racing	1	
OutRun 2 SP: Special Tours	—	2004	Sega AM2	Racing	1	
OutRunners	—	1992	Sega	Racing	2	
Outtrigger	—	1999	Sega AM2	First-person shooter		
Out Zone	—	1990	Toaplan	Scrolling shooter	2	
Over Drive	—	1990	Konami	Racing	1	
Over Rev	—	1997	Jaleco	Racing	2	
Over Top	—	1996	Alpha Denshi	Racing	2	
Ozma Wars	—	1978	SNK	Fixed shooter	2	
Ozon I	—	1983	Proma		2	
