= Beast Busters =

1989 video game

- North American flyer
- Developers: SNK; Images Design (Amiga)
- Publishers: SNK; U.S. Gold; Activision
- Director: Hamachi Papa
- Producer: Hamachi Papa
- Designer: Yasuharu Ebara (hardware)
- Programmer: Henry Clark (Amiga)
- Artists: Mitsuzo I. Ken; Muromoto; Sakai Goma; Masato Miyoshi; Yoshihisa Maeda; Hideki Fujiwara; Ken Jarvis (Amiga)
- Composers: Toshikazu Tanaka; Masahiko Hataya; Matthew Simmonds (Amiga)
- Platforms: Arcade, Amiga, Atari ST
- Release: November 1989: Arcade; 1990: Amiga, Atari ST
- Genres: Rail shooter, horror
- Modes: Single-player, multiplayer

Beast Busters (ビースト バスターズ) is a rail shooter horror game released by SNK for arcades in 1989. It was the first three-player light gun shooter video game. Ports were released for the Amiga and Atari ST in 1990.

== Plot ==
In the year 199X, an unprecedented incident happened. Strange reporting of dead people (codenamed Beasts) coming back to life and attack the living. Realizing the unconventional nature of the incident, the mayor of the city where the outbreak occurred offered an immense reward to whoever manages to solve the mystery and contain the outbreak. Three heavily armed bounty hunters Johnny Justice, Paul Patriot and Sammy Stately enter into the Beast-infested city.

== Gameplay ==
Beast Busters is a rail shooter where the player shoots zombies.

In the game, players control one of three mercenaries named Johnny Justice, Paul Patriot and Sammy Stately, who must discover the cause of a bizarre outbreak and shoot their way out of a city that has been invaded by the undead called Beasts. The original arcade machine allows for up to three players to play the game at the same time. Guns are mounted to the machine and look like machine guns. Players can earn a number of power-ups through the course of each stage to aid them in battle such as rockets, grenades, armor, health packs, and ammo.

The game has seven sections for players to shoot their way through. In between stages players are shown cutscenes explaining the events of the zombie infestation that has overtaken the city. Each stage has a sub boss as well as an end boss to defeat, all of which have 2 forms to defeat. The game was known for having unusual bosses, such as a zombie punk who mutates into a dog, or a jeep which starts coming to life. One stage ends with the militiamen having to rescue a female CIA agent from that stage's boss.

== Reception ==
In Japan, Game Machine listed Beast Busters on their January 15, 1990 issue as being the most-successful upright arcade unit of the month. It went on to become Japan's fifth highest-grossing dedicated arcade game of 1990 and ninth highest-grossing dedicated arcade game of 1991. In North America, the game became the second top-earning arcade game in early 1990, below Teenage Mutant Ninja Turtles.

The game drew comparisons to Operation Thunderbolt, Line of Fire and SNK's own Mechanized Attack. ACE rated it 4 out of 5 and reacted positively to the game's horror theme and story, calling it Operation Wolf meets Splatterhouse.

According to Paul Theroux, Michael Jackson owned a Beast Busters arcade machine and frequently took it with him on tour via cargo plane.

== Legacy ==
A sequel entitled Beast Busters: Second Nightmare (ビーストバスターズ セカンドナイトメア) was released in 1999 on the Hyper Neo Geo 64.

A handheld spin-off called Dark Arms: Beast Buster was released in 1999 for the Neo Geo Pocket Color in the form of an Action RPG.

Beast Busters featuring KOF was released in December 2014 for iOS and Android devices as a free-to-play download. On June 8, 2015, a buy-to-play version called Beast Busters featuring KOF Deluxe was released. The game ended its service in August 2015.

== See also ==
- Laser Ghost
