= Martial Masters =

1999 arcade video game

- Developer: IGS
- Publisher: IGS: NA: Andamiro Entertainment
- Platform: Arcade
- Release: TW: 1999; JP: 2000; NA: March 2001
- Genre: Fighting
- Mode: Up to 2 players simultaneously
- Arcade system: PolyGame Master

Martial Masters (Chinese: 形意拳 Xíngyìqúan) is an arcade fighting game developed by International Game System (IGS) of Taiwan and originally released in 1999 on their PolyGame Master arcade board. The game was released in Japan in 2000 as Shin-Ī Ken (シンイーケン), and was brought over to the United States by Andamiro in 2001 as Martial Masters. The setting and characters draw inspiration from Hong Kong martial arts films. It was not ported to other platforms until 2023 when it was released as part of IGS Classic Arcade Collection on Nintendo Switch.

== Gameplay ==
Gameplay screenshot

The game features 12 fighters, each with their own special moves and fighting styles. Moves include throws, air attacks, ground attacks, taunts, teleport, recovery, martial arts moves, special moves, and super special moves. Martial Masters has a combo counter, and has Pressure Moves which are performed by pressing the control stick in a certain direction with a button. Roll Recovery allows the players to recover from an attack that knocks their character down before they hit the ground. Flash Attack knocks the player's opponent away. Shadow Attacks has two variations of attack, the first being a juggle type attack that will knock an opponent up into the air, while the second is a ground attack that can usually do anywhere between 4 and 13 hits.

== Plot ==
At the end of the Qing dynasty, the government weakened by corruption was attacked by foreign influences. The people were flung into misery and became quite unsatisfied with the situation. They did not believe in the government anymore and turned their faith back to religion.

The White Lotus sect saw this as an opportunity and took over. They claimed to help the government to defeat foreigners and bring peace to the world. Their ideology was quickly adopted. Everything related with the Western world was killed or destroyed. Anyone against this principle was considered an enemy and accused of being bound with the devil. Dragon of Martial Master and Master Huang of Po Chi Lam could not accept these outrageous actions so they band together in order to prevent much bloodshed.

== Characters ==
- Master Huang: The righteous young heir to the Hongjiaquan style.
- Crane: A practitioner of the crane style (Hè Quán).
- Monk: A large muscular Shaolin monk.
- Drunk Master: A master of drunken boxing (Zuì Quán) based on Beggar Su from the Drunken Master film.
- Red Snake: A practitioner of the snake style (Shé Quán) and Scorpion's fiancée.
- Ghost Kick: Based on the character Club Foot from Once Upon a Time in China III, he is a rickshaw puller who fights only with his legs.
- Scorpion: Based on the villain Sunny from Operation Scorpio, he practices the scorpion style. A womanizer, he is unwillingly engaged to Red Snake.
- Monkey Boy: A 21-year-old man who practices the monkey style (Hóu Quán), he also has some monkeys as his "disciples".
- Reika: A girl whose town was destroyed by the White Lotus Sect in a failed attempt to kidnap her, she fights to find out the reason of her kidnapping.
- Tiger: Possibly based on Tiger from Once Upon a Time in China, but unlike his namesake in the film, he protects missionaries from the White Lotus group. Practices the tiger style (Hǔ Quán).
- Saojin: Huang Fei-hung's father's sworn sister and his sworn aunt, she is based on Thirteenth Aunt from the Once Upon a Time in China series. She is a secret playable character and sub-boss for Red Snake. Her style is unknown, and is the only character who have helpers who are Leung Foon, Lam Sai Wing and Bucket So (all Master Huang's disciples who also appear in his stage, but they are no longer there if Saojin is present).
- Lotus Master: A mysterious man who poses as the leader of White Lotus Sect who wishes to take over the sect, he is based on Priest Kung from Once Upon a Time in China II. His style is unknown, but is labeled as "secret skills of White Lotus Cult".
- True Lotus Master: The true leader of White Lotus Sect, he can be considered an overpowered version of Lotus Master. He is also a secret playable character, but he has no endings of his own.

== Development ==
The setting and characters draw inspiration from Hong Kong martial arts films, specifically Once Upon a Time in China, Drunken Master and Operation Scorpio. The game is highly reminiscent of Capcom's fighting games of the mid to late 1990s, with mechanics similar to those of Street Fighter III. Martial Masters is IGS's third arcade 2D fighting game, with Alien Challenge being their first, The Killing Blade their second, and Spectral vs. Generation being their fourth (in collaboration with Idea Factory).

In April 2023, IGS released the IGS Classic Arcade Collection on the Nintendo Switch, a compilation of eight games originally created for the IGS PolyGame Master. Included in the collection is Martial Masters.

== In Other Media ==
An arcade cabinet of the game can be seen in the background of the BlackBerry office in the 2023 biopic film of the same name.
