= Demon Front =

2002 video game

- Developer: IGS
- Publisher: IGS
- Platform: Arcade
- Release: 2002
- Genre: Run and gun
- Modes: Single-player, multiplayer
- Arcade system: PolyGame Master

Demon Front (Chinese: 魔域戰線; pinyin: Móyù Zhànxiàn) is a side-scrolling run and gun arcade game released in 2002 by International Games System. It shares many characteristics with the Metal Slug series.

In April 2023, IGS released the IGS Classic Arcade Collection on the Nintendo Switch, a compilation of eight games originally created for the IGS PolyGame Master. Included in the collection is Demon Front.

== Gameplay ==
The gameplay is similar to Metal Slug and other run and gun games, but it lacks the vehicles that were an element of Metal Slug.

In addition, there are some unique features in the game. Each of the four characters brings along a pet, which can be sent to attack enemies or used as a shield. There are three buttons: Shoot, jump, and shield. Holding the shoot button charges the player's pet, and when released the pet launches a stationary devastating attack for a few seconds. The shield button converts the pet into a shield that is permanent, until players press the button again or it takes enough damage to disappear. Melee attacks and pet attacks release hearts which boost their shield power.

Characters include Jake and Sara, two regular humans from Earth. Dr. J, a scientist, and Maya an ape. All characters largely play the same.
