= Magnum Light Phaser =

Light gun controller for video games

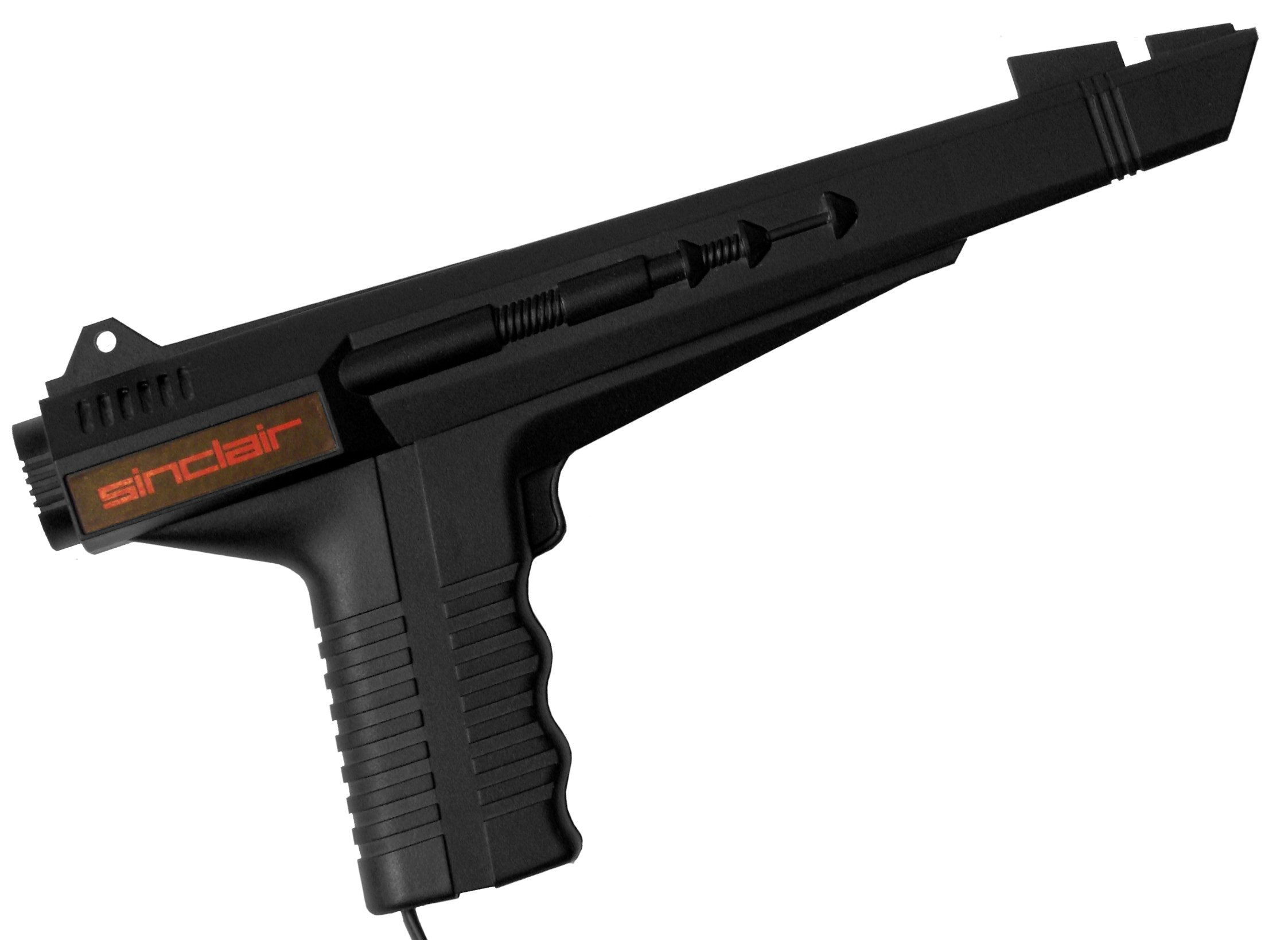
- The Magnum Light Phaser
- Manufacturer: Amstrad
- Type: Video game controller
- Lifespan: 1987

The Magnum Light Phaser is a light gun created in 1987 for the ZX Spectrum computer. A version was also released for the Commodore 64/128. It was Amstrad's last peripheral for the microcomputer. The Magnum Light Phaser in many ways resembles the Light Phaser, the Master System light gun, released in 1986. It was a Sinclair-branded Far Eastern product which was included in promotional bundles such as the "James Bond 007 Action Pack", along with a small number of lightgun-compatible games.

It was also available separately in a £29.95 pack along with six games. Only a few games bothered with lightgun compatibility (Operation Wolf, the original arcade gun game, was the most notable) and fewer still were produced specifically for use with the Magnum. Even so, the lightgun was widely available, largely because Amstrad's bundling policy ensured wide distribution.

Software Creations created five exclusive games for the Commodore 64 package.

== Supported Games ==
ZX Spectrum:

- Bullseye
- James Bond 007
- Missile: Ground Zero
- Operation Wolf
- Robot Attack
- Rookie
- Solar Invasion

Bundled with the Commodore 64 version:

- Baby Blues
- Cosmic Storm
- Ghost Town
- Goosebusters
- Gunslinger
- Operation Wolf (replaces the NEOS mouse control option)

Bundled with the Commodore 64 Lightgun package, and compatible with the Magnum:

- Army Days
- Gangster
- Time Traveller
- Blaze-Out (compilation of Ocean game sequences with lightgun controls)
