= Dark Arms: Beast Buster 1999 =

1999 video game

- Developer: Noise Factory
- Publisher: SNK
- Platform: Neo Geo Pocket Color
- Release: JP: October 21, 1999; EU: November 12, 1999; NA: November 23, 1999
- Genre: Action role-playing
- Mode: Single player

Dark Arms: Beast Buster 1999 (Note: Known as Beast Buster: Biological Weapons of Darkness (Japanese: ビーストバスター 〜闇の生体兵器〜, Hepburn: Bīsuto Basutā: Yami no Seitai Heiki) in Japan and Dark Arms in Europe.) is an action role-playing game released by SNK for the Neo-Geo Pocket Color in 1999. It is a spin-off follow-up to the SNK arcade shooter Beast Busters. The game was later re-released as part of Neo Geo Pocket Color Selection Vol. 1 in 2021.

== Gameplay ==
Dark Arms has the player become the Beast Buster, a human who can't remember their past but has made a pact with The Master to gain power. As they explore the Dark Realm, they learn more about the nature of the world and meet Joyce, a girl with a connection to the people who live in this world of monsters.

The player can collect the spirits of the various demons and zombies they fight in the game with a gun known as "The Catcher".

The player-character can then use captured spirits to 'feed' their weapons and evolve them into more powerful forms. For example, the Handgun evolves into the Sub Shotgun, which can evolve further into the Shotgun.

== Reception ==
Reception

Review scores
Publication	Score
AllGame	4/5
Consoles +	82%
Computer and Video Games	4/5
GameSpot	7/10
IGN	5/10
Dreamzone	8/10
Pocket Gamer	D−

Dark Arms: Beast Buster received mixed reception from critics since its release.

In 2014, HobbyConsolas's Álvaro Alonso identified Dark Arms: Beast Buster as one of the twenty best games for the Neo Geo Pocket Color.
