= PolyGame Master =

Arcade system board made by IGS

The PolyGame Master (PGM) is an arcade system board released in 1997 by the Taiwan company IGS. The PGM was developed in order to compete with the likes of SNK's Neo Geo MVS system in Taiwan. It was succeeded by PGM2 in 2007, and PGM3 in 2012.

DoDonPachi DaiOuJou, released by CAVE, came on a single dedicated board and utilizes a customized BIOS programmed by CAVE. Ketsui and Espgaluda, again released by CAVE, came on a single dedicated board, but did not have a separate BIOS, as these functions are integrated into the main program.

== IGS PolyGame Master ==
=== Description ===
The IGS PolyGame Master is an arcade system released by IGS in 1997. It features many video games, the most notable of which are the titles from the Knights of Valour series.

In April 2023, IGS released the IGS Classic Arcade Collection on the Nintendo Switch, a compilation of eight games originally created for the IGS PolyGame Master.

=== System specifications ===
- Main processor: Motorola 68000, running at 20 MHz
- Sound processor: Zilog Z80, running at 8.468 MHz
- Sound chip: ICS2115; 32 channel PCM
- Protection chip: ARM7 ASIC with internal code, running at 20 MHz
- Hardware features: 1 scrolling 8×8 tiles 4bpp scrolling tilemap, 32×32 tiles 5bpp scrolling tilemap with linescroll, arbitrary size 5bpp sprites, zoom and shrink capabilities

== IGS PolyGame Master 2 ==
=== Description ===
The IGS PolyGame Master 2 is an arcade system released by IGS in 2007, succeeding the IGS PolyGame Master. It features few video games, the most notable of which being the game Knights of Valour 3 from the Knights of Valour series.

=== System specifications ===
- Main processor: IGS036 (differs per game, internal code)
- Graphic processor: IGS037
- Sound chip: Yamaha YMZ774-S
- Protection chip: R5F21256SN (extra MCU for protection and IC Card communication)
- Media: ROM (custom program ROM module (KOV3 only))

== IGS PolyGame Master 3 ==
=== Description ===
The IGS "PolyGame Master 3" is an arcade system released by IGS in 2015, succeeding the IGS PolyGame Master 2. It features only one game, an HD version of Knights of Valour 3 called Knights of Valour 3 HD from the Knights of Valour series.

=== System specifications ===
- Main processor: ARM1176
- Chipset: Xing Xing SOC38
- RAM: NANYA 2 GB DDR3
- Media: SD Card (capacity max to 8 GB)
- Screen resolution: 16/9 (1280x720) or 4/3 (800x600)
- Player input: JAMMA or JVS

== List of games ==
=== For PGM ===
Title	AKA title	Chinese title(s)	Japanese title	Release year	Notes
Dragon World II	China Dragon II	Zhōngguó Lóng II	Chūgoku Ryū II	1997	Game licensed by Alta.
Oriental Legend		Xīyóu Shì È Zhuàn		1997	Included in IGS Classic Arcade Collection.
Dragon World 3	China Dragon 3	Zhōngguó Lóng 3	Chūgoku Ryū 3	1998	Released in the US by HanaHo Games.
Dragon World 3 EX	China Dragon 3 EX	Zhōngguó Lóng 3 EX	Chūgoku Ryū 3 EX	1998	
The Killing Blade		Ào Jiàn Kuáng Dāo	Gōken Kyōtō	1998	
Oriental Legend Special		Xīyóu Shì È Zhuàn Super		1998	Included in IGS Classic Arcade Collection.
Knights of Valour		Sānguó Zhàn Jì	Sangoku Senki	1999	
Knights of Valour Plus	Knights of Valour in Three Kingdoms	Sānguó Zhàn Jì Zhèngzōng Plus	Sangoku Senki Purasu	1999	Included in IGS Classic Arcade Collection.
Knights of Valour Superheroes		Sānguó Zhàn Jì - Fēngyún Zàiqǐ	Sangoku Senki Sūpāhīrō	1999	Included in IGS Classic Arcade Collection.
Photo Y2K	Real and Fake			1999	
Puzzle Star		Móhuàn Xīngzuò		1999	
Puzzli 2				1999	
Dragon World 3 Special	China Dragon 3 Special		Chūgoku Ryū 3 Supesharu	2000	
Knights of Valour 2		Sānguó Zhàn Jì 2	Sangoku Senki 2	2000	
DoDonPachi II		Nù Shǒulǐng Fēng II - Fēng Bào		2001	
Dragon World: Pretty Chance	China Dragon: Pretty Chance		Chūgoku Ryū: Puriti Chansu	2001	Game licensed by Alta.
Dragon World 2001	China Dragon 4	Zhōngguó Lóng 2001	Chūgoku Ryū 2001	2001	Game licensed by Alta.
Knights of Valour 2 Plus: Nine Dragons		Sānguó Zhàn Jì 2 - Qúnxióng Zhēngbà	Sangoku Senki: Bushou Souha	2001	Included in IGS Classic Arcade Collection.
Martial Masters		1) Xíng Yì Quán; 2) Shin Li Chen		2001	Released in the US by Andamiro. Included in IGS Classic Arcade Collection.
Photo Y2K 2	Real and Fake 2			2001	
Puzzli 2 Super				2001	
Demon Front		Móyù Zhànxiàn		2002	Included in IGS Classic Arcade Collection.
DoDonPachi DaiOuJou				2002	Game developed and published by CAVE.
DoDonPachi DaiOuJou Black Label				2002	Game developed and published by CAVE.
Espgaluda				2003	Game developed and published by CAVE.
The Gladiator	The Road of Sword	Dòuhuàn Kuáng		2003	Game licensed by Alta. Included in IGS Classic Arcade Collection.
Ketsui: Kizuna Jigoku Tachi				2003	Game developed and published by CAVE.
Happy 6-in-1				2004	
Knights of Valour Superheroes Plus		Luànshì Xiāoxióng	Sangoku Senki Sūpāhīrō Purasu	2004	
Oriental Legend Special Plus		Xīyóu Shì È Zhuàn Super Plus		2004	
Shiny 3-in-1	Flash 3-in-1			2004	
The Killing Blade Plus		Ào Jiàn Kuáng Dāo Jiāqiáng Bǎn	Gōken Kyōtō Purasu	2005	
Spectral vs. Generation	S.V.G.			2005	Game co-developed with Idea Factory.

=== For PGM2 ===
Title	AKA title	Chinese title	Japanese title	Release year	Notes
Oriental Legend 2		Xīyóu Shì È Zhuàn 2		2007	
Knights of Valour 2: New Legend		Sānguó Zhàn Jì 2 - Héngsǎo Qiān Jūn	Sangoku Senki 2: New Legend	2008	
The King of Fighters '98 Ultimate Match Hero				2009	Game developed by New Channel in co-operation with SNK Playmore.
DoDonPachi DaiOuJou Tamashi				2010	Game developed by CAVE and published by IGS.
Puzzle of Ocha			Ochainu No Pazuru	2010	Game developed by Compile Heart.
Jigsaw World Arena				2010	Game developed by Idea Factory under license by Nippon Ichi Software.
Knights of Valour 3		Sānguó Zhàn Jì 3	Sangoku Senki 3	2011	

=== For PGM3 ===
Title	AKA title	Chinese title	Japanese title	Release year	Notes
Knights of Valour 3 HD		Sānguó Zhàn Jì 3 HD	Sangoku Senki 3 HD	2012	
