= DoDonPachi II =

2001 video game

- Japanese arcade flyer
- Developer: IGS
- Publishers: JP: Capcom; WW: IGS
- Series: DonPachi
- Platform: Arcade (IGS PolyGame Master)
- Release: JP: May 21, 2001; NA/EU: 2001
- Genres: Vertical scrolling shooter, Bullet hell
- Modes: Single-player, multiplayer
- Arcade system: PolyGame Master

DoDonPachi II: Bee Storm (Japanese: 怒首領蜂II DoDonPachi Tsū; Chinese: 蜂暴 Bee Storm) is a 2001 vertically scrolling bullet hell shoot 'em up developed by International Games System (IGS) and published by Capcom. It is the only entry in the DonPachi series to not be developed by Cave.

== Gameplay ==
Gameplay screenshot

DoDonPachi II is a vertical shooter in which the player controls one of 3 different ships, each with different weapons, and flies through up to 7 different stages, dodging projectiles shot by enemies and destroying both enemies and background objects, which drop items that can be collected for power-ups and additional points. At the end of each stage, a boss appears, each having multiple different attack patterns and consisting of individual parts that can be destroyed. Unlike other games in the DonPachi series, plot details are very vague and do not connect to any games before or after it.

=== Game modes ===
Upon starting the game, players are given the choice between three different modes:

- Combat is the main mode, taking the player through all 6 stages.
- Practice is a shortened version of the game, only containing the first 4 stages.
- Internet Rank is identical to Combat Mode, having the full 6 stages as well. After completing the game, the player is given a code, intended to be entered on the official IGS website so as to upload the player's high score to an online leaderboard.

In addition to 6 stages and bosses, a secret seventh stage containing the true final boss known as Hibachi can be accessed in the Combat and Internet Rank modes if the player obtains 400 million points. Unlike other DoDonPachi games, there is no "second loop" that can be unlocked by completing the game while fulfilling certain conditions; bee medals found by destroying certain background objects in each stage, which normally contribute to game completion in other titles, give a fixed value of 20,000 points in DoDonPachi II.

=== Ship types/Styles ===
There are 3 different ship types that can be chosen from:

- a narrow shot with fast movement;
- a wide shot with slow movement;
- and a shot that moves alongside the ship with medium movement.

Upon selecting a ship, the player is given the choice of using a 'Bomb Style' or an 'Energy Style'.

- Bomb Style gives the player 5 "bombs", screen-filling attacks that can destroy enemy bullets and render the player invincible from damage, which are activated by pushing the B button. This amount can be replenished with bomb items that can be obtained by destroying enemies in stages.
- Energy Style exchanges the bombs for a new mechanic: by narrowly dodging bullets fired at enemies (a technique known as "grazing" among shoot 'em up fans), the player builds up a meter located at the bottom of the screen. When the meter is filled up, the player can push the B button to fire a super powerful laser, cancelling bullets and rapidly increasing the combo gauge. After activating the laser, the gauge empties, requiring it to be refilled in order to be used again. When using the Energy Style, bomb items serve no purpose but to give the player 20,000 points.

=== Combo system ===
The combo system as seen in DonPachi and DoDonPachi returns in Bee Storm, but it is changed from those games. Combos can be built up by defeating enemies with shot or laser attacks, or by attacking large enemies with the laser in Energy Style. Instead of the combo resetting if enough time passes without defeating enemies, the combo rapidly decreases until it reaches zero.

== Development ==
DoDonPachi II, despite the name, was not developed by Cave. Instead, it was developed by Taiwan-based IGS (or International Games System). IGS obtained the license to the DoDonPachi name for a new game to release on IGS' new Poly Game Master hardware. The game was first sold in Asian territories like China and Korea before being bought over to Japan.

Around this time, Cave was considering leaving the arcade business due to their decline in popularity and difficulties finding publishers for their work (Progear would have been their final game). However, the success of DoDonPachi II convinced Cave to continue their arcade game business, developing DoDonPachi DaiOuJou a year later.

DoDonPachi II supports Japanese, Chinese, English and Korean. The interface language depends on the protection chip inside the game cartridge, which provides region information. In addition, the game's title, stage names and boss names are also altered depending on the region.

=== Music ===
A soundtrack for the first 2 DoDonPachi games was released by Scitron Digital Content.

== Reception ==
In Japan, Game Machine listed DoDonPachi II on their August 1, 2001 issue as being the eighth most-successful arcade game at the time. Time Extension called the game "a hit, convincing CAVE to both stay in the market and to adopt IGS’s PGM hardware for their future titles."

Time Extension said the game apes "the bullet hell style with enjoyable but somewhat crude results" and "[...] the story of how it came to be and how it affected CAVE’s future is the most compelling aspect of its history".
