= Keyboardmania =

2000 video game

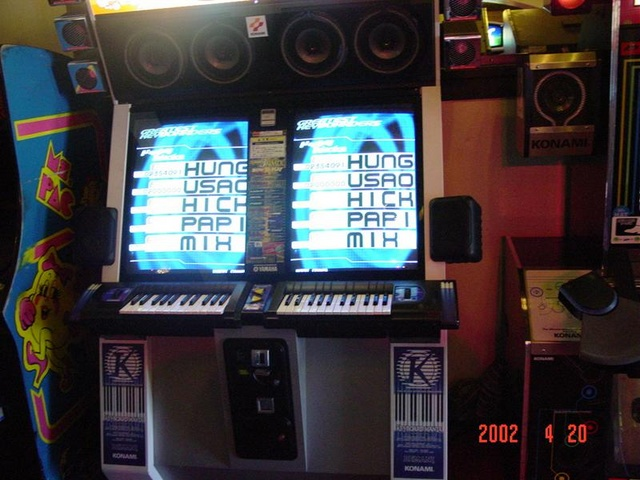
- Keyboardmania 3rd Mix cabinet
- Developer: Konami
- Publisher: Konami
- Platform: Arcade
- Release: 2000
- Genre: Music
- Mode: Up to 2 players simultaneously
- Arcade system: Firebeat

Keyboardmania (キーボードマニア, Kībōdomania) (alternately KEYBOARD MANIA, and abbreviated KBM) is a rhythm video game created by the Bemani division of Konami. In this game, up to two players use 24-key keyboards to play the piano or keyboard part of a selected song. Notes are represented on-screen by small bars that scroll downward above an image of the keyboard itself. The goal is to play the matching key when a note bar descends to the red play point line. The arcade cabinet has two screens - one for each player.

There is also a simulator called DoReMi Mania, which uses *.pms files, but the players can use a MIDI-to-pms converter to simplify editing.

== Arcade release ==
Keyboardmania has three Japanese arcade releases:

- Keyboardmania (February 6, 2000)
- Keyboardmania 2ndMIX (October 6, 2000)
- Keyboardmania 3rdMIX (March 15, 2001)

== Super linking session ==
Keyboardmania 3rdMIX has a linking feature with Drummania 4thMIX/GUITARFREAKS 5thMIX and Drummania 5thMIX/GUITARFREAKS 6thMIX with a dozen songs.

== Home version ==
Keyboardmania has 2 home versions for PlayStation 2:

- Keyboardmania (September 21, 2000)
- Keyboardmania II (2ndMIX & 3rdMIX) (February 28, 2002)

The home version of the game has modified controller similar to the arcade keys.

One other notable version is for Windows PCs and is shipped with the Yamaha EZ-250i Keyboard, which is used to play:

- Keyboardmania Yamaha Edition (July 23, 2003)

== Song lists ==
The list is incomplete

=== Keyboardmania ===
Song	Genre	Artist	Video description	BPM	Tier
All the love	R&B	LaLa Moore	Aya, the song character, dances slowly.	106	
ARMAJIRO	Progressive	Bunmei	Cybernetic guy exercises with jumping rope, in the middle he trips over and he resumes after his recovery.	184	
Brain Child	Retro Techno	Logic System	As the girl watches the television, a gifted boy practices with pulling ups and dish washing. He balances two dishes while walking through the forest and log bridge. A stray dog barks, casing the dishes to fall and break. The boy cries, but suddenly a circus clown arrives with a "New Dish", giving him new pair. It causes him to fly to the sky and to the outer space.	120	
BURNIN'	B3-HARD	Bunmei, Ryo	With burning backgrounds and choreography, the solo rocker performs the song with a vacuum cleaner instead of a metal guitar.	173	
Confusion	Mixed Beat	Thomas		131	
CRISIS OF LOVE	HI-ENERGY	T.R.S.R. featuring MIHO-F		139	
Dicky's Theme	Trenchcoat Jazz	Naya~n Big Band		160	
Fairy Tale	Dream	Q-mex	Shining blue flashes, crystal-like patterns and water-like backgrounds.	140	
gymnopedie (skip over MIX)	Sky Walk	Mitsuto Suzuki			Home version of Keyboardmania only
Henry Henry	Cathedral	Bunmei		180	Also in pop'n music 10
Keyboard Man	A.O.R'N BASS	simon		165	
kimi ni ai ni yukou	HIPHOP	Pictures of Lily		123	Unavailable in Keyboardheaven
Let's go back home (for Christmas)	SWEETLY	Larry Caorin	The girl (same character from "Brain Child") drives into the city, and on the highway during sunset.	138	
Mighty Guy	Maximum	CHIHOMI	Aya dances rhythmically and lively in the fast-paced background.	156	Also in pop'n music 16 PARTY; Unavailable in Keyboardheaven
Mighty Guy -Long Version-	Maximum	CHIHOMI		156	Home version of Keyboardmania only
morning music	K-CLASSIC	Bubble System	Looping warm up sequence for Konami's Bubble System arcade hardware.		
MR. C.C	DETUNE	N.R.B	Keyboardmania's principal character named "Usao-kun", the purple-furred rabbit, walks along the path, ignoring his breakthrough wall. He sleeps on his bed at the end of the video.	200	Also in pop'n music 10
My Love	Love Ballad	Q-mex & CHELSEA	Various footage of love-themed videos with on-screen song lyrics.	87	
Pf Concerto NO. 2	MAESTRO	Prokochsky	Usao-kun's majestic conducting performance in fantasy-themed scene.	180	
Shake!	50's	Bunmei	A bowling ball player (in paper animation) shakes by beat along with his back-up dancers on bowling center.	175	Also in pop'n music 9
Shining Dream	STYLISH	Magic project	Flashy lights, zooming seascape and skies.	155	Unavailable in Keyboardheaven
しりとり (Shiritori)	STRAIGHT	Fantastic Factory		187	Also in GUITARFREAKS 5thMIX & drummania 4thMIX and Pop'n music 8; Unavailable in Keyboardheaven
The 24th D	Goa Trance	SPARKER		145	
TRUTH	Fusion				Home version of Keyboardmania only

=== Keyboardmania 2ndMix ===
Song	Genre	Artist	Video description	BPM	Tier
AKUMAJO DRACULA MEDLEY	K-CLASSIC	矩形波倶楽部 (kukeikakurabu)	Scenes of Transylvania and horrific creatures based on Castlevania game series. It features Simon Belmondo.	102-142	also in Dance Dance Revolution ULTRAMIX3 and pop'n music 9
Beyond the Ocean	ASIAN	WORLD SEQUENCE		122-124	Also in pop'n Music 19 TUNE STREET
Cycletron	Fingering	HIROYUKI NAMBA		176	
Hear My Love Song	POWER	SAKI	Two boxers on the boxing ring, the thin man with red gloves and a buffed man with blue gloves. After the thin man gives several punches, the buffed man then uses a machinegun-like lightning punches until the thin man faints.	120	Licensed song
HEAVEN'S GATE	Brilliant	NAHJEE & HATA		152	
INSPECTOR N.	DANDY	III	Scenes based on detective stories within investigation, gambling, suspense and crimes.	125	
Journey to the Wonderland	Polka Dots	N.P.B	Three little elves dance for the welcome to the "wonderland", which is a toy world.	130	
Manhattan Sports Club	TURBAN	simon	Two alien twins, Apsara and Seijin, and their race perform their dance. It features a crossed dance pad similar to Pump it Up.	178	Also in pop'n music 8
まっさら (MA-SSA-RA)	Lite Pop	natural bear		164	Also in pop'n music 8
Memories	Dramatic	Naya~n	Inspirational, relaxing live sublime messages, the goldfish, the autumn forest, the clouds and old train.	80	
Motion	ELECTRONICA	SPARKER	Sky-blue background detailed with electronic patterns and texts based on electronic variants.	160	
Onion Ring	60's	HIROYUKI NAMBA		132	
Presto	Piano Ambient	Osamu Kubota		135	Also in beatmania IIDX 3rd Style AC
REGRET	HAMMER	Ryo & Q-Mex 5		132	
Ride on the Light	Formula	Mr. T	In 3D-animated video, the green Cyber Bird, launched from her Duck Ship, confronts the blue Cyber Shark on the skies. She takes damage from her opponent, so she summons the heavy weapon to retaliate the Cyber Shark. She calls the Duck Ship to crash him away. As the struggling ends, Cyber Bird dynamically poses with "Ride on the Light" title.	160	
Sabre Dance	Fight	A.Khachaturian	Usao-kun and the green bear races across the obstacles and urban city, fighting each other with kitchen utensils.	185	
SNOW AFTERNOON	EZ Listenin'	UNIVERS 6		???-136	
STEAM AND DREAM	EU-TECH	V.C.O	Tree atomic balls, linear wormhole, and vast cloudy city.	135	
SUN BEAM	Hyper Latin	Nahjee	On the beach, Usao-kun mambo-dances with his dog pet.		
USAO-KUN	KIDS	THE RABBITS	Usao-kun writes his diary about visiting his friend, the green bear, to buy carrots, but his wallet is lost after he finds his shirt ripped. The dog returns his found wallet and Usao-kun is happy, and gives him a bone. Green bear and his pet cat joins the strolling happily.	140	
VITALIZE	PWM	SPHINX		138	

=== Keyboardmania 3rdMix ===
Song	Genre	Artist	Video description	BPM	Tier
Blessing	Sanctity	Q-mex	Silent and snowy town as if it is a Christmas theme.	72	Also in Pop'n Music 14 FEVER CS
Carezza	Swing	Osamu Kubota		128	
CASSANDRA	Ska	Annetai Maji SKA Bakudan	Generic video	190	Supported in session play; from GUITARFREAKS 5thMIX & drummania 4thMIX
Citta' del sole	Vivace	Q-mex	Red roses and crimson patterns.	140	Also in pop'n music 12 いろは
CLASSIC PARTY 3	Classic Medley	Hideyuki Ono	Generic video	76-240	Supported in session play; from GUITARFREAKS 5thMIX & drummania 4thMIX
COSMIC COWGIRL	Rock	Toshio Sakurai	Generic video	145	Supported in session play; from GUITARFREAKS 5thMIX & drummania 4thMIX
DEAR MY FRIEND	J-Pop	Maki	Generic video	133	Supported in session play; licensed song
DEPEND ON ME	Pops	THOMAS HOWARD with AMSD BAND	Generic video	129	Supported in session play; from GUITARFREAKS 5thMIX & drummania 4thMIX
EE-AL-K	Far East	Shinji Hosoe [Remix]	Usao-kun walks like kung-fu warrior with an arrow (a controller) below him. He makes his adventure through oriental world, China.	120	Remix of Yie Ar Kung Fu's main theme.
ERIZE NO TAMENI (Für Elise)	Classic	L.V. Beethoven	Generic video	???	Unlockable song
Frozen Ray	Trance	dj TAKA	Arctic, cold and icy patterns, rays and lights.	156	Its remix, "Frozen Ray ~For Extreme", appears in Dance Dance Revolution EXTREME
Illegally Sane	Dangerous	Tatsuya Nishiwaki		131	
Klungkung 1655	Gamelan	simon		180	Also in pop'n music 12 いろは
Labyrinth	Cool	Nahjee	Generic video	154	Supported in session play; also in GUITARFREAKS 5thMIX & drummania 4thMIX
Limitation	Theme	Seiya Murai		150	Original version of Keyboardmania 2ndMix's title theme
Midori no Kaze (Winds of Green)	Cure	Naya~n		72	Also in pop'n Music 15 ADVENTURE
Monkey Magic	J-Pop	Gary Adkins	Generic video	116	Supported in session play; licensed song
Mr. Moon	Dance Pops	Julie Ann Frost	Generic video	150	Supported in session play
NEW CENTURY GENERATION	Spark	Magic Project		131	Also in pop'n music 10
Parade of the Wooden Soldiers	Classic	LEON JESSEL	Generic video	125	Unlockable song
Pink Rose	Heart	Kiyommy+Seiya		145	Also in pop'n music 5 CS, Beatmania IIDX 12 HAPPY SKY, and Dance Dance Revolution EXTREME
Q no tameno SONATA	Noble	J.S.Mech		147	
SENSATION -from Salamander 2-	K-Generation	Shinji Hosoe [Remix]		200	Remix of Salamader 2's main theme
SHOW THEM THE WAY	Relax	Nahjee		115	
Smoky Town	Quartet	Q.U.A.D		189	
Threshold Label	Chaos	Tatsuya Nishiwaki	Generic video	184	
To the 44883	Walky	Mr. T		100	
The Least 100sec	Progressive	Hirofumi Sasaki		264	Supported in session play; from GUITARFREAKS 5thMIX & drummania 4thMIX
Three Worms	New York Funk	Jimmy Weckl	Generic video	140	Supported in session play; from GUITARFREAKS 5thMIX & drummania 4rdMIX

== Notable songs ==
These songs were later featured in Dance Dance Revolution Extreme and every subsequent Dance Dance Revolution arcade release, excluding Dancing Stage Fusion:

- Frozen Ray - also in Beatmania IIDX 6th Style
- Pink Rose - also in Pop'n music 5 (for the Japanese PlayStation) and Beatmania IIDX 12.HAPPY SKY
- The Least 100sec - one of the dozen songs that can be played in the Super linking Session. This song also appears in Pop'n music and the Beatmania series, including III and IIDX.

== Trivia ==
- Since there are 24 keys, the range is C3-B4.
