= King of the Monsters (video game) =

1991 video game

- Arcade flyer
- Developer: SNK (Note: SNES version developed by Genki Co., Ltd.; Genesis/Mega Drive version developed by SPS; Linux, MacOS, and Windows versions developed by DotEmu.)
- Publishers: SNK: Super NES Takara Genesis/Mega Drive; NA: Takara; EU/JP: Sega
- Producer: H. Hamachi
- Designers: Mitsuzo I. Tomomi M. Toshiaki Joe
- Artist: Sakai Goma
- Composers: Kazuhiro Nishida; Toshikazu Tanaka
- Series: King of the Monsters
- Platforms: Arcade, Neo Geo AES, Super NES, Sega Genesis
- Release: February 25, 1991: Arcade; JP: February 25, 1991; NA: February 1991 Neo Geo AES; JP/NA: July 1, 1991 Super NES; JP: July 31, 1992; NA: October 1992; EU: 1992 Genesis/Mega Drive; NA: March 1993; EU: June 1993; JP: November 26, 1993
- Genre: Fighting
- Modes: Single-player, multiplayer
- Arcade system: Neo Geo MVS

King of the Monsters (Note: Japanese: キング・オブ・ザ・モンスターズ, Hepburn: Kingu Obu Za Monsutāzu) is a 1991 fighting game developed and published by SNK for the Neo Geo arcade and home platforms. The game features playable giant monsters that are reminiscent of characters from kaiju and tokusatsu films.

In 1992, a sequel titled King of the Monsters 2 was released for arcades. Months later, King of the Monsters was ported to the Super Nintendo Entertainment System. It would then be ported to the Sega Genesis in 1993. It was included in the compilation SNK Arcade Classics Vol. 1, which was released for the Wii, PlayStation 2 and PlayStation Portable in 2008.

== Gameplay ==
Gameplay screenshot

Players choose one of six monsters (four in the 16-bit ports) for battle, and two players can join forces to fight the monsters together. Battles end when one of the monsters is pinned for a three count or if time expires (in which case both sides lose).

During each round, the player must fight using the punch, kick, or by grabbing their adversary to perform a body slam, pile driver, or an atomic back drop.

The game consists of 12 total levels (8 in the 16-bit ports) which takes place in 6 cities in a futuristic 1996 Japan. Each city is featured twice with the game beginning and ending in Tokyo. Other cities include Kyoto, Okayama, Osaka, Kobe and Hiroshima (the latter two are omitted from the SNES port. The Sega Genesis port only features Tokyo with the other cities being "Mega Port", "Dragon City", and "Castle City"). The player first must defeat all six monsters, with the last monster being oneself, but in a different palette. Then the player must defeat the six monsters again, in the same order, but this time in different cities.

== Characters ==
- Geon: A Godzilla-like dinosaur.
- Woo: A King Kong-like giant gorilla (not available on the ports).
- Poison Ghost: A creature composed of toxic waste (not available on the ports).
- Rocky: A giant Moai-like golem made of boulders.
- Beetle Mania: A large beetle-like creature.
- Astro Guy: A giant Ultraman-like superhero.

== Other appearances ==
In 1992, a sequel called King of the Monsters 2: The Next Thing was released. In 2005, three characters from that sequel (Cyber-Woo, Super Geon and Atomic Guy) were featured in the SNK Playmore game NeoGeo Battle Coliseum, a fighting game featuring many of the company's popular characters. These characters also appeared as character cards in the DS game SNK vs Capcom: Card Fighters DS.

In addition, to the original ports, King of the Monsters was included in SNK Arcade Classics Vol. 1 featuring many rare pieces of the game's production art. Hamster Corporation re-released the game as part of their ACA Neo Geo series for the PlayStation 4, Xbox One, Nintendo Switch, Windows, Android and iOS. A Neo Geo CD version was advertised and even previewed, but it never released.

== Other media ==
King of the Monsters was regularly featured on the Nickelodeon game show Nick Arcade, and on earlier broadcasts of Sky1 show Games World.

== Reception ==
Reception

Review scores
Publication	Score
Game Players	5/10 (SMD)
Nintendo Power	3.2/5 (SNES) (Note: Nintendo Power scored the SNES version 3.3/5 for graphics/sound, 2.6/5 for play control, 3.4/5 for challenge, and 3.5/5 for theme/fun.)

In Japan, Game Machine listed King of the Monsters as the fourth most successful table arcade unit of March 1991. Likewise, RePlay reported King of the Monsters to be the third most popular arcade game of April 1991.

Mega criticized the game, awarding it a score of 10%, with Andy Dyer calling it "unforgivably bad. There should be laws to protect us from crud like this".

IGN reviewed the game in 2008, giving it a mediocre score of 5.5/10, with Lucas Thomas commenting "There's certainly some appeal to the sight of giant creatures kicking over skyscrapers and stadiums on their way to slap one another into submission, but King of the Monsters just ends up being far too shallow".
