= Ketsui: Kizuna Jigoku Tachi =

2003 video game

- Developer: Cave
- Publishers: AMI (Arcade); Arika (DS); 5pb. (PS3/360); M2 (PS4)
- Composer: Manabu Namiki
- Platforms: Arcade, Nintendo DS, Xbox 360, PlayStation 3, PlayStation 4
- Release: Arcade: JP: 28 January 2003; Nintendo DS: JP: 23 October 2008; Xbox 360: JP: 22 April 2010; PlayStation 3: JP: 25 July 2013; PlayStation 4: JP: 29 November 2018; NA: 20 November 2020
- Genre: Manic shooter
- Mode: Up to 2 players simultaneously
- Arcade system: PolyGame Master

Ketsui: Kizuna Jigoku Tachi (ケツイ ～絆地獄たち～) is a 2003 vertical shoot 'em up arcade game by Cave, released in Japanese arcades. A Nintendo DS boss rush version was released in October 2008 in Japan. It included a Superplay DVD featuring a world record scoring run by a top ranked player. The arcade game was ported to the Xbox 360 and released in 2010. A special version of Dodonpachi Daifukkatsu Black Label was released on the Xbox 360 in 2011, which is a crossover with Ketsui, featuring the ship, re-arranged music and scoring system from Ketsui on top of the Dodonpachi Daifukkatsu Black Label scoring system.

== Gameplay ==
Arcade version screenshot

Scoring

Ketsui's scoring system centers around numbered "chips" that are dropped from defeated enemies. Each chip bears a number from 1 to 5, signifying their value, which gets added to the player's accumulated total of chip points when collected. The value of a chip is dependent on the player's proximity to the enemy when it is destroyed using the player's normal shots. For example, destroying an enemy from far away will yield lower-value chips (such as 1s and 2s) while destroying enemies at close range will yield higher-value chips (such as 4s and 5s). When a chip whose value is higher than 1 is obtained, a counter will appear in the upper-left of the screen and quickly count down from 60 to 0. While this counter is above zero, every enemy destroyed with the player's lock-on shots will drop chips with the same value as the chip collected that was higher than 1, regardless of proximity. For example, if the player destroys an enemy at point-blank with their normal shots and receives a 5-value chip, then quickly switches to their lock-on shots, every enemy destroyed will yield 5-valued chips, regardless of proximity and so long as the counter stays above 0. When the counter hits 0, every enemy destroyed with lock-on shots will only yield 1-valued chips, though the player can keep replenishing the counter by quickly collecting more chips that are valued higher than 1.

While using the lock-on shot, however, the player will lose a small number of their accumulated chip points per enemy defeated, forcing the player to balance between normal and lock-on shots in order to obtain the highest number of accumulated chips possible per stage. At the end of each stage when the player faces the boss, the player's total number of chips will slowly deplete throughout the duration of the boss battle. The number of chips remaining at the end of the boss battle will act as a multiplier and greatly increase the player's end-of-level score, thus defeating the boss quickly will yield a higher multiplier.

Fighters

- AH-Y72 Tiger Schwert: Fires in wide formation, slow movement, fast lock-on, Lloyd Evansmann and Alice Blackbarn.
- FH-X4 Panzer Jäger: Fires in straight formation, fast movement, slow lock-on, Steele Yurek and Yuma Nanase.

Stages

1. Noisy Town - INTERCEPTION

A fortified city under EVAC's direct control. A pedestrian bridge, state-of-the-art skyscrapers, a stadium with a large baseball field and even an indoor sky slope, but the roads and structures are littered with enemy aircraft and artillery emplacements, hidden and ready to strike.

- Sub-Boss: Medium-sized and pontoon-equipped helicopter Sea Horse
- Boss: "Air superiority" large combat helicopter Bullfrog

2. Armored Green - SUBURB

A forward operating base hidden deep in the forest surrounding the city. This is where every model of tank at EVAC's disposal is first encountered.

- Sub-Boss: Large connected tanks Gem & Ini
- Boss: Multi-tracks battle tank XM-117 Sphynx

3. Twilight Fleet - CANAL FLEET

An EVAC naval base where much of its fleet are harbored, some ships being well armed, particularly one huge battleship.

- Sub-Boss: Multi-purpose, SRBM equipped warship RBB-S1 Vinogradov
- Boss: V/STOL transport and attack craft Jamadhar

4. Lurk in the Darkness - DEFENSIVE LINE

A valley and rocky path is in the way towards EVAC's Headquarters, but unknown to the pilots, the old staging and testing area has been extensively retrofitted and fortified in an attempt to stop their advance.

- Sub-Boss: Base security enforcer Black Draft
- Boss: Experimental modular vehicle Cinderella Amber

5. Day of Judgement - EVAC INDUSTRY

EVAC's vast weapons development facility, an extensive and technologically advanced complex which houses the true heart of the corrupt corporation. After descending to the lowest level and fighting through Hell, the vertigo of the final battle awaits. Most notably, apart from the reappearance of every weaker enemy in an upgraded form, the player has to challenge the production models of their own attack craft: Ketsui Death Label clarifies that those "A" models are still inferior to the prototypes available to the players, lacking modifications performed on them by Alice Blackbarn, but are better armored.

- Sub-Boss: Tracks-mounted heavy anti-aircraft cannon "Defensive Tower Trafalgar"
- Boss: Heavy mobile combat fortress Evaccaneer (prototype - still in development)

Continuing with Cave's long-standing tradition, more skilled players can enter a second round of the game, consisting of the same stages with noticeably increased difficulty. There are two sets of conditions:

- Omote/Tsuujou Loop: If the player has used no continues, and the Sum of lives lost and bombs used is 6 or less, the player will qualify. In this mode, the scrolling direction is inverted, and all enemies release pink "suicide bullets" unless destroyed at very close range. The player cannot reach the Evaccanneer DOOM (the True Last Boss).
- Ura Loop: If the first loop is cleared with a score of over 120,000,000 points with no deaths and no bombs deployed, the WELCOME TO SPECIAL ROUND message is displayed and the Ura game begins. In this mode, all enemies fire approximately double the number of shots, and release blue suicide bullets unless destroyed at close range. After destroying Evaccaneer again, the player is forced to challenge the game's TLB, Evaccaneer DOOM. This battle has a hidden time limit of 180 seconds (3 minutes), and the player cannot use continues during the battle, which means if the player loses all lives during the DOOM fight, the game will be over.

== Plot ==
In 2054, global warming causes widespread environmental disasters, including the rapid melting of polar ice caps and rising sea levels that submerge several nations. The resulting loss of habitable land and depletion of natural resources lead to international conflicts, eventually escalating into World War III. Efforts by the United Nations to end the hostilities are unsuccessful, partly due to the continued supply of advanced military equipment to the opposing forces.

An investigation identifies EVAC Industry Co., Ltd., a private arms manufacturer and dealer, as a major supplier of weapons to multiple parties involved in the conflicts. The company profits from the ongoing warfare and, in some instances, directly intervenes to prolong hostilities. Attempts to negotiate with its board of directors fail. Through its arms sales, EVAC accumulates sufficient financial resources to establish its own cities, shipyards, defensive installations, and private airport. The company also maintains an independent military force consisting of heavily equipped mercenaries.

Being unable to enter the fray officially, the UN sets up a strike team of four pilots, each pair given one of two advanced helicopters: the plan is to simulate a rebellion within EVAC forces and bring down the company's headquarters, where research on a series of tremendous warmachines is taking place; for this reason, the planes both bear EVAC insignia and callsigns and are built according to stolen prototype blueprints - by no means, in success or failure, must the operation be traced back to the United Nations.

For all this secrecy to be effective, even in victories the assault choppers will have to be destroyed and the pilots killed, but to compensate for their sacrifice, the UN shall fulfill one of their wishes, no matter what it is.

== Later releases ==
Arika, developer of the PlayStation 2 ports for DoDonPachi DaiOuJou and Espgaluda, had expressed interest in porting Ketsui to the PlayStation 2 as well, but they claimed that the console was insufficient for achieving the arcade-perfect quality they sought. Specifically, the second half of stage 5 employs a quick swap of the entire background plane, coupled with reversing the overall scrolling direction ("tate-ana"). Arika claimed that this was unachievable with the standard amount of RAM and processing power of the PlayStation 2.

=== Mobile versions ===
In 2003, Cave released a mobile phone version of the game as two separate titles, available for imode (for 504/505/506 and FOMA90*i series) and Yahoo platforms. A DX version for FOMA 900 and 901 was released in 2004. The EZWeb version was released in 2005.

Danmakukenteishiken Ketsui Hen (弾幕検定死験 -ケツイ編-) is a spin-off title based on Ketsui, released in 2006 for imode. This version is a boss battle version of the game, emphasizing on dodging bullets. The player's goal is to earn ranks by repeatedly defeating the same boss, but with increasing difficulty in successive runs.

=== Nintendo DS release ===
In 2007, Arika's vice president Ichiro Mihara mentioned the release of Nintendo DS version of Ketsui in his personal page . The game, subtitled Death Label, was available for download in test events on March 31. Video footage of the game was also released by Mihara. In the time-limited demo, players had 120 minutes to face off against Doom with a single ship and no bombs. Another demo event took place at Cave Festival in Akihabara on September 23 and 24. This version has a time limit of 24 hours, and contains extra levels. The retail version of the game was released in Japan in 2008 and includes a DVD Superplay video with the then current world record of the arcade release using Ship A.

The game adds the ability to save replays, which can be sent to other Nintendo DS units. In addition, it can upload the Ketsui demo game to other game consoles via Download Play. The EVAC Report feature allows players to unlock up to 113 panels covering the 11 bosses' artworks when specific conditions are met, some as simple as changing the sound options or touching all four corners of the screen with the ship, others as complex as defeating a boss in under 15 seconds or clearing Extra Mode. At times, failure to unlock a panel within a certain deadline might partially unlock it, revealing a grayed portion of the picture and what is required to unlock that portion; clearing modes, uncovering entire pictures and/or unlocking certain panels enables questions and replays in the Tell me! IKD-san! extra featurette.

Single player modes

- Novice: Sea Horse (mid-boss), Gem & Ini (mid-boss), Jamadhar (boss)
- Normal: Black Draft (mid-boss), Bull Frog (boss), Trafalgar (mid-boss), Sphinx (boss)
- Hard A: Sea Horse (mid-boss), Cinderella Amber (boss), Vinogradov (mid-boss)
- Hard B: Gem & Ini (mid-boss), Sphinx (boss), Evaccaneer (last boss)
- Hard C: Vinogradov (mid-boss), Trafalgar (mid-boss), Black Draft (mid-boss), Evaccaneer DOOM (true last boss)
- Very Hard: All 10 bosses and mid-bosses in arcade order with the arcade's first loop difficulty.
- Death Label: All 10 bosses and mid-bosses, in non-arcade order with the arcade's second loop difficulty.
- Extra Mode: A graphically toned-down and remixed Stage 5 from the arcade version, preluding a fight with an exclusive, extremely difficult version of Ketsui's True Last Boss, Evaccaneer DOOM.
- DOOM Mode: Five battles against an increasingly more difficult True Last Boss, Evaccaneer DOOM

Each mode is unlocked by completing the previous mode, with the exception of DOOM Mode, which is available from the start. Also, the game permanently increases the starting lives in a difficulty should the player fail to complete it.

Multiplayer mode

- VS mode: Competes against other player for multiplier chip. When one player has a longer win/loss gauge, multiplier chip goes to that player when an enemy is destroyed.

Training mode: Allows selecting stage, boss difficulty, player's ship, ship stock, bomb stock and auto bomb.

=== Extra release ===
The March 2008 issue of Famitsu Weekly magazine reported that 5pb.'s Division 2 would bring three titles, including Ketsui, to the Xbox 360 platform as Xbox Live Arcade titles, but 5pb. representative Masaki Sakari claimed Microsoft rejected 5pb.'s proposals and 'decided to cut down faithful arcade ports'. An Xbox 360 retail version called Kizuna Jigoku Tachi was released on April 22, 2010. The port is considered to be highly accurate both by Mihara and expert players. The port also contains an exclusive "X mode" arrange.

A PlayStation 3 port of the Xbox 360 version was released in July 2013. This marks the first region-free release of the full game and the first Cave title in a PlayStation console in almost a decade.

=== PlayStation 4 release ===
In November 2018, M2 released an enhanced port of Ketsui in Japan entitled Ketsui Deathtiny -Kizuna Jigoku Tachi- for PlayStation 4 as part of their M2 ShotTriggers line. An English localization was later released on the US PSN store in November 2020.

== Reception ==
Reception

Review scores
| Publication | Score |
|---|---|
| Eurogamer | (PS4) Positive |
| Famitsu | (DS) 29/40 (X360) 23/40 (PS3) 26/40 |
| Gameblog | (PS4) 9/10 |

Famitsu magazine awarded Ketsui: Kizuna Jigoku Tachi Extra a score of 26/40 based on four reviews (6/7/7/6).
