= Operation Wolf 3 =

1994 video game

- Developer: East Technology
- Publisher: Taito
- Platform: Arcade
- Release: September 1994
- Genre: Shooting gallery
- Modes: Single-player, multiplayer

Operation Wolf 3 (Note: Japanese: オペレーションウルフ 3, Hepburn: Operēshon Urufu Surii) is an arcade game developed by East Technology and released in September of 1994 by Taito. It has no connection to the two previous games in the series, Operation Wolf and Operation Thunderbolt, other than the title and controls.

Instead of the military theme of the first two games, Operation Wolf 3 casts players as counter-terrorist operatives. It is the only game in the series to feature graphics composed of digitized photographs, similar to Lethal Enforcers. The game also features entirely different gun controllers from the previous games.

== Plot ==
A terrorist organization known as "SKULL" has taken over an island and are armed with nuclear missiles. Two agents, codenamed "Hornet" and "Queen Bee" (players one and two respectively) are dispatched by "Gun Metal Army" to take down "SKULL" and disarm the nuclear missiles.

== Gameplay ==
One or two players progress through five stages: Warehouse, Freeway, Wasteland, and Silo, with the fifth stage involving players shooting down missiles in mid flight. Throughout the stages, various powerups are found, such as stronger weapons, and extra bombs.

Unlike the limited ammo found in Operation Wolf, this game has unlimited ammo. As long as the trigger is squeezed, weapons will fire on full automatic. Once the ammo counter is depleted, the rate of fire decreases sharply. When the trigger is let go, the counter instantly refills. A pump slide underneath the front of the gun barrel is used for bombs. Up to three bombs can be carried at a time, as opposed to nine in the first game.
