= Othello (1984 video game) =

1984 video game

- Developer: Success
- Publisher: Success
- Platform: Arcade
- Release: JP: September 1984
- Genre: Reversi
- Modes: Single-player, multiplayer

Othello (Note: Japanese: オセロ, Hepburn: Osero) is a 1984 video game developed and published by Success for arcades. It was released in Japan in September 1984. It is one of the first games to be developed by Success, who would later become highly prolific and gain fame with the Cotton series. Hamster Corporation released the game outside Japan for the first time as part of their Arcade Archives series for the Nintendo Switch and PlayStation 4 in February 2025, with its presence in the series compared negatively to its usual output due to its generic nature.

== Gameplay ==
The game is a typical Reversi video game, where players take turns to place black and white discs onto empty squares. The goal is to outflank the opponent's pieces and flip it over until the grid is filled up. The computer opponent is a smiley who reacts to the match with deadpan facial expressions.
