= Line of Fire (video game) =

1989 video game

- Japanese arcade flyer
- Developer: Sega (Note: Home computer versions developed by Creative Materials; Master System version developed by Sanritsu.)
- Publishers: Sega; Home computers U.S. Gold
- Composers: M.A; Home computers David Lowe
- Platforms: Arcade, Amiga, Amstrad CPC, Atari ST, Commodore 64, ZX Spectrum, Master System
- Release: Arcade: JP: October 4, 1989; NA: April 1990; Home computers: UK: December 1990; Master System: PAL: December 19, 1991
- Genre: Light gun shooter
- Modes: Single-player, multiplayer
- Arcade system: Sega X Board

Line of Fire, released as Line of Fire: Bakudan Yarou (Note: Japanese: ライン・オブ・ファイヤー 爆弾野郎, Hepburn: Rain Obu Faiyā: Bakudan Yarō) in Japan, is a 1989 light gun shooter game developed and published by Sega for arcades. It was released with two arcade cabinet versions: a standard upright and a sit-down cockpit, both featuring two positional guns. The cockpit design allows the player(s) to sit down while playing the game, while having two-handed machine guns, controlled by a potentiometer-controlled gun alignment software system. The game follows a two-man commando unit as they try to escape from a terrorist facility after seizing a prototype weapon.

The arcade game was praised by critics for its pseudo-3D graphics and cockpit cabinet, but its gameplay was criticized for being derivative of Operation Wolf (1987) and Operation Thunderbolt (1988). It was converted for home computers and published by U.S. Gold in 1990, and then released for the Master System in 1991; however, the style of the latter version was changed to that of an overhead scrolling shooter game. Reviewers thought the home computer versions had "blocky" visuals but nonetheless had some nice touches, while the Master System version also received mixed reviews.

== Gameplay ==
Arcade screenshot

The player controls a member of a two-man commando team who has been charged with going behind enemy lines to bring down a terrorist organization which has access to a large arsenal of weaponry. During the mission, the team finds a "special weapon", which is a vehicle mounted, automatic machine pistol, and must report their findings. However, the player is faced with many enemy troops and military vehicles which need to be destroyed in order for the commando squad to escape in the jeep, and must use the "special weapon" against the terrorists.

The game is played from a first-person perspective, with two cabinet-mounted positional light guns used to shoot enemies on the screen. There are eight stages which take place in various settings, including the enemy base, jungle, canyons, desert and ruins. At the end of each is a boss vehicle that must be destroyed in order to progress. Ammunition is limited to a few clips of bullets for the machine gun, a small supply of hand grenades and a screen clearing missile, although additional supplies can be obtained by shooting the relevant icon when they appear during play.

The stages scroll both horizontally and into the screen via a pseudo-3D effect. Thanks to Sega's dedicated sprite handling hardware and software, the game is able to combine the two movements in a single instance, thus effectively creating the illusion of twists and turning corners. This revolutionary engine allows the player to experience a somewhat convincing 3D landscape. Between stages, a map screen is displayed which shows the player progressing through the terrorist facility and towards freedom.

== Development ==
The Line of Fire arcade machine uses the Sega X Board hardware, comprising two Motorola 68000 processors running at 12.5Mhz as its CPU, and sound is reproduced using a Yamaha YM2151 sound chip. It features raster graphics at a resolution of 320 x 224 pixels on a horizontally orientated monitor. There are two different arcade cabinets available for the game. One cabinet allows the player(s) to sit down as they are playing the game, reaching forward to use the cabinet mounted light guns. The other is an upright cabinet with attached light guns.

== Ports ==
The Master system version is a vertically scrolling shooter.

U.S. Gold acquired the license to release the game on home computers, and versions were produced for the Amiga, Amstrad CPC, Atari ST, Commodore 64 and ZX Spectrum. The conversion for all five home computers was handled by Creative Materials and all were released in December 1990. There is no light gun support for these versions: instead, the player moves a crosshair using a mouse, joystick or keyboard to target enemies, and pressing a button to fire.

A version developed by Sanritsu for the Master System was published by Sega in 1991. This release is an overhead vertically scrolling shooter, although the storyline and locations are mostly unchanged. The game does not feature light gun support, and instead uses the standard control pad. This game also features support for the SegaScope 3-D Glasses, a way of viewing the game in 3D, if the player enters a button combination when starting up the console with the Line of Fire cartridge inserted.

== Reception ==
Reception

Award
Publication	Award
Computer and Video Games	C+VG Hit

In Japan, Game Machine listed Line of Fire as the third most successful upright arcade unit of January 1990. In the United Kingdom, it was one of the top four highest-grossing arcade games during early 1990, along with Teenage Mutant Ninja Turtles, Tecmo World Cup '90, and Super Masters. In North America, Line of Fire was the top-grossing new video game on the RePlay arcade charts in July 1990.

The arcade game was met with a positive-to-mixed reception from critics, with praise for its pseudo-3D graphics and sit-down cabinet but a mixed response to its derivative gameplay heavily based on Operation Wolf and Operation Thunderbolt. Line of Fire received a positive review from S: The Sega Magazine, calling it an "utterly fab" game with "amazing 3D graphics" and "heart-stopping action throughout." RePlay magazine praised the "impressive" graphics and action, stating "the graphics are extremely crisp" and clear, the "explosions look real" and it "achieves a near 3D depth effect" with "realistic backgrounds" that scroll "away" as enemies "come flying in towards you" while stating the gameplay is "a no-holds-barred joyride through explosions and action that just doesn't quit."

Sean Kelly of Zero magazine called it "the best game" at London's 1990 Amusement Trades Exhibition International (ATEI) and stated that, despite being "an Operation Thunderbolt derivative," it "goes about ten steps better." He praised the "fantastic graphics and sonics throughout" the game, "some rather excellent original ideas" and the "brilliant two-handed machine guns" in the sit-down cabinet. Amiga Action called the arcade game "revolutionary" with "addictive two player action" and "a real 3D landscape that your character could run through, shooting both in front and behind" him. Zzap!64 praised the graphics but criticized the gameplay and lack of difficulty. CU Amiga gave it an average review with a 66% score, calling it a poor clone of Operation Wolf, with graphics that "aren't as sharp" and lacking dramatic sound. There was praise for the sit-down cabinet, but the reviewer said this was the only lasting appeal, although they found it a nice touch that defeated enemies stay on the screen rather than disappearing after a few moments, allowing the player to survey the scene they have just created.

Retrospectivaly, Hardcore Gaming 101 praised the graphics, comparing its sprite manipulation to later first-person shooters and textured-mapped 3D polygons, but said the gameplay is "nothing spectacular".

=== Home conversions ===
The home conversions received mixed reviews. The Commodore 64 version received a score of 32% in Zzap!64 magazine, with a lack of enemies on screen being a major criticism, although it was said that the attempt at 3D was impressive. The reviewers found the difficulty curve a problem, with level one being too easy and too long, followed by tougher later levels.

The Amiga version was more well received, although it was still not without faults. Tony Horgan said in Amiga User International that a "great job has been done in recreating the graphics of the original" but found the pace a little slow. He said that this kind of game works better in an arcade as home conversions do not manage to hold the player's attention. The same Zzap!64 review as the Commodore 64 version said that the Amiga version had good presentation with regards to the introduction and map screens between levels, but that the in game graphics were "blocky", and that there were perhaps too many enemies on screen at any one time, in stark contrast to the Commodore 64 version. Amiga Action magazine thought that the Amiga conversion was a "first class conversion from a decent coin-op", and that it really captured the feel of the arcade machine. A minor criticism was that the scoreboard at the top of the screen can obscure enemies from the player's view, leading to damage being inflicted on the player's character. Amiga Format's Trenton Webb praised the Amiga version's speed and said that the graphics "mimic their arcade parent as well as any non-custom circuit set could hope to", although the sprites look rather blocky. Steve Merritt said in CU Amiga that the Amiga version is more playable that the arcade version, but that the last few levels should have been made more difficult. Richard Leadbitter gave both the Amiga and ZX Spectrum versions 85% in his review for Computer and Video Games magazine, praising the pace of the game, especially in the ZX Spectrum version.

The Master System version received mixed reviews. Console XS gave it an 82% score. It was met with some disappointment by the reviewers in Mean Machines, due to it being a very different version to the original arcade game. They said that the Master System had been proved more than capable of running games similar to the original, mentioning Dynamite Duke as an example. They said that it was a poor overhead shooter and although the game has the same locations and general storyline of the original the graphics are too small and badly drawn to be able to tell. They also found the game very easy, it only took one of the reviewers an hour to reach the last level. They thought that people who played the original in the arcade would be the most disappointed of all.
