= The Scorpion King (1992 film) =

1992 Hong Kong film by David Lai

- Hong Kong theatrical poster
- Directed by: David Lai
- Written by: Barry Wong; David Chan
- Produced by: Sammo Hung
- Starring: Chin Kar-lok; Lau Kar-leung; Kim Won-jin
- Cinematography: Wong Bo-Man
- Edited by: Alan Poon
- Production companies: Bo Ho Film Company; Golden Harvest
- Distributed by: Golden Harvest
- Release date: 12 November 1992
- Running time: 101 minutes
- Country: Hong Kong
- Language: Cantonese
- Box office: HK $512,932.00

The Scorpion King (released in Hong Kong as Operation Scorpio) (Chinese: 羯子戰士) is a 1992 Hong Kong martial arts film directed by David Lai, and produced by Sammo Hung. The film stars Chin Kar-lok, Lau Kar-leung and Kim Won-jin. The film was released theatrically in Hong Kong on 12 November 1992.

== Plot ==
Budding comic book artist Yuk Su (Chin Kar-Lok) finds himself living out the fantasies of his alternate world when he saves a young girl from an illegal prostitution racket. After he was expelled from medical school his father took Yuk Su to one of his father's friends to help him keep up with his education. Soon he found a teacher (Lau Kar Leung) who can help him live on his dreams and be a legendary hero. With the aid of his fecund imagination and the help of an aging kung fu expert Yuk Su becomes something even he had never dared dream, a hero in real life.

== Cast ==
- Chin Kar-lok as Yuk Su / Yu Shu
- Lau Kar-leung as Master Yat / Master Lo
- May Lo as Jade
- Kim Won-jin as Sonny Wang
- Fung Woo as Uncle Chai
- Victor Hon as Mr. Wang
- Frankie Chin as Bull / Jean Pal
- Steven Yuen as Inspector Hua
- Tiffany Lau as Lan
- Lawrence Lau as Fatty Hsing
- Yuen Miu as Tallie
- Sai Gwa-pau as Waiter
- Wang Han-Chen as Uncle Jung
- James Lai as Inspector Hua's son
- Fung Yuen-chi as Loanshark in Su's dream
- Yuen Tak as Hua's Henchman
- Thomas Sin as Tien

== Release ==
Fox released the DVD in the US on May 25, 2004.

== Reception ==
J. Doyle Wallis of DVD Talk rated it 3/5 stars and wrote, "Extremely mediocre story is elevated by the action talent on hand, mainly Kim Won-jun, whose jaw dropping skills make the film worth owning for any martial fan." The Encyclopedia of Martial Arts Movies rated it 3.5/4 stars and wrote of the climax, "Although slightly marred by wire special effects, the bulk of the battle is breathtaking martial arts – perhaps some of the best ever filmed, and certainly the best of the year."

== Styles ==
Xieziquan (Chinese: 蝎子拳)- A Chinese kung fu martial art which focuses almost exclusively on kicks, Xieziquan was utilized by Sonny Wang and incorporated the Korean martial art known as Taekwondo into his own signature style to make it resemble a scorpion.

Boxing- A basic sport that uses: 1. Jab 2. Cross 3. Hook 4. Uppercut This fighting style was used by Bull/Jean Paul in a fight against Sonny Wang following the attempted abduction of his father.
