= Operation Wolf =

1987 video game

- North American arcade flyer
- Developer: Taito
- Publisher: Taito
- Platform: Arcade: NES, Master System, ZX Spectrum, MSX, Commodore 64, Amstrad CPC, Amiga, Atari ST, MS-DOS, FM Towns, PC Engine
- Release: October 1987: Arcade; JP/EU: October 1987; NA: December 1987 Amiga, CPC, ST, C64, Spectrum; EU: October 8, 1988 NES; JP: March 31, 1989; NA: March 1989; EU: 1992 Master System; EU: 1990
- Genre: Light gun shooter
- Mode: Single-player

Operation Wolf (Note: Japanese: オペレーションウルフ, Hepburn: Operēshon Urufu) is a 1987 light gun shooter video game developed and published by Taito for arcades. It was ported to many home systems.

The game was critically and commercially successful. It was one of the highest-grossing arcade games of 1988 and won the Golden Joystick Award for Game of the Year. Operation Wolf popularized military-themed first-person light gun rail shooters and inspired numerous clones, imitators, and others in the genre over the next decade. It spawned three sequels: Operation Thunderbolt (1988), Operation Wolf 3 (1994) and Operation Tiger (オペレーションタイガー) (1998). A remake, Operation Wolf Returns: First Mission, was released in 2023.

== Gameplay ==
Assuming the role of Special Forces Operative Roy Adams, the player attempts to rescue five hostages who are being held captive in enemy territory. The game is viewed from a first-person perspective, and is on rails, with the screen scrolling horizontally through the landscape. The game has six stages to advance the story. For example, after the jungle stage is completed, Adams interrogates an enemy soldier and learns the location of the concentration camp and hostages. Each stage has unique objectives and effects on gameplay after completion, all based on rescuing hostages. Game over screens vary depending on situations, such as the player's death or failure to rescue a single hostage. Continuing the game restarts the stage. The Nintendo Entertainment System version has multiple endings depending on the number of rescued hostages.

The arcade cabinet has an optical controller resembling an Uzi submachine gun which the player can swivel and elevate, and which vibrates to simulate recoil of gunfire. Pulling the trigger allows fully automatic fire, and pressing the button near the muzzle launches a grenade with a wide blast radius against multiple targets.

To complete each stage, the player must shoot a required number of soldiers and vehicles (trucks, boats, helicopters, armored transports), as indicated by an on-screen counter. The limited ammunition and grenades can be replenished by shooting objects. Shooting dynamite bombs causes heavy damage to every target on the screen, both enemy and friendly, and a special machine gun power-up allows unlimited ammunition and an increased rate of fire for 10 seconds.

Enemies attack with gunfire, knives, grenades, mortar and bazooka rounds, and missiles; all their visible incoming projectiles can be shot out of the air. The player has a damage bar that slowly fills due to enemy attacks or shooting friendly targets such as nurses and boys. Damage can be recovered by collecting health power-ups and completing stages.

== Ports ==
MS-DOS version

The game was converted to the Amstrad CPC, MS-DOS, NES, Amiga, Atari ST, Master System, FM Towns, Commodore 64, PC Engine, and ZX Spectrum. Most lack light gun support (except NES and Master System) and must be played with a keyboard or a controller. In 1989, a special ZX Spectrum version with Magnum Light Phaser support was produced for inclusion in Amstrad's ZX Spectrum +2 and +3 Action Pack hardware bundles. The box for the Master System version features promotional art from Operation Thunderbolt.

In 2005, Operation Wolf was released on the Xbox, PlayStation 2, and Windows within Taito Legends without light gun support. The NES version was released on the North American Wii Virtual Console in February 2008 without light gun support.

== Reception ==
Reception

Review scores
Publication	Score								
Publication	Amiga	Arcade	Atari ST	C64	Master System	NES	PC	TurboGrafx-16	ZX
ACE				894			894 (CPC)		887
AllGame		4.5/5							
Crash									91%
Computer and Video Games		Positive	91%	92%					91%
Electronic Gaming Monthly						25/40			
Génération 4	93%		93%						
Mean Machines Sega						53%			
Player One						70%			
Sinclair User									90%
The Games Machine (UK)				79%	90%		89% (CPC)		87%
Your Sinclair		Positive							9/10
Zero								86%	
Zzap!64				91%					
Commodore User		9/10							
Computer Entertainer						7.5/8 stars			
The One	89%		89%						
S: The Sega Magazine					91%				

Awards
Publication	Award
Sinclair User	Over The Top Game of 1988
Golden Joystick Awards	Game of the Year (8-bit), Best Coin-Op Conversion (8-bit), Best Coin-Op Conversion (16-bit)

=== Commercial performance ===
The game was commercially successful. In Japan, Game Machine listed Operation Wolf in its December 1, 1987 issue as the second most-successful upright or cockpit arcade cabinet of the month, and it went on to become the second highest-grossing arcade game of 1988 (below Sega's After Burner and After Burner II). In Europe, Operation Wolf debuted as the top-grossing arcade game of October 1987 in the United Kingdom, and again topped the charts in December 1987; it held the top spot through March 1988, and remained in the top five through July, when it was number four on the Coinslot dedicated arcade game chart (below Street Fighter, Continental Circus, and WEC Le Mans). Operation Wolf went on to become the top-earning arcade game of 1988 in the United Kingdom. In the United States, Operation Wolf was one of the top five highest-grossing dedicated arcade games of 1988.

The home computer conversions topped the UK sales charts in late 1988 until it was replaced by RoboCop which held the number one position for most of 1989.

=== Critical response ===
Upon release in arcades, the game received wide acclaim from critics, particularly for its gameplay, graphics, and controls. Its violence was criticized, particularly in the UK press following the Hungerford massacre that had occurred a few months before its release. Commodore User said it beats Sega's After Burner as "the game of the year and much of next year too" but that it may draw some controversy from tabloids for its Rambo-like violent content. Clare Edgeley of Computer and Video Games called it one of the best new releases, stating that, though excessively violent, it was an "extremely playable" and "powerful" fast-paced action game. Your Sinclair called it a "fast and furious" action game, and said it "broke a bit of new 'ground' for arcade games 'cos the 'nasties' fired directly at you through the screen".

The home computer conversions also received positive reviews. Your Sinclair gave the ZX Spectrum conversion a highly positive review. The NES version received more mixed reviews. In Electronic Gaming Monthly's review of the NES conversion, three critics scored it 6/10, one 8/10.

=== Accolades ===
Sinclair User gave the arcade game the "Over The Top Game of 1988" award, for the "shooting game most likely to push you over the edge" in 1988. The home computer conversions won several awards at the 1989 Golden Joystick Awards for 1988, including overall Game of the Year (8-bit), Best Coin-Op Conversion (8-bit), and Best Coin-Op Conversion (16-bit). It was later voted number 26 in the "Your Sinclair Readers' Top 100 Games of All Time" poll. Crash awarded it a Crash Smash. Computer and Video Games awarded it a CVG Hit.

== Legacy ==
Operation Wolf had long-term influence on the market upon its release. It is credited with evolving the light gun shooter genre. It departed from the shooting gallery, carnival, and cartoon themes that had previously dominated the genre for decades, from electro-mechanical games in the 1960s until Nintendo's Duck Hunt in 1984, and moved the genre toward more realistic, violent, and military shooter themes. In contrast to Taito's earlier gun games including Attack (1976), N.Y. Captor (1985), and Cycle Shooting (1986) which have simple cartoon graphics, Operation Wolf has more realistic graphics. This provides a depth of perspective by using different sized sprites.

Operation Wolf took the military themes of 1980s run and gun video games (such as Commando, Green Beret, and Ikari Warriors) and action films (such as Rambo and Commando) and applied them to light gun shooters. It presents a novel light gun shooter basis for the prisoner of war (POW) rescue mission with massive violence, killing masses of enemy soldiers. It innovates on the mounted gun mechanism - used before in Taito's Attack and even older Midway mechanical games from the 1960s - by using an optical sensor and a physical sensation of gunfire. It spawned many arcade shooters with mounted machine gun controls and increasing levels of violence during the late 1980s to early 1990s. Den of Geek cited it as a precursor to the then emerging first-person shooter genre.

The game popularized first-person light gun rail shooters and inspired numerous clones and imitators during the late 1980s to early 1990s. Examples include SNK's Mechanized Attack and Sega's Line of Fire in 1989, SNK's Beast Busters in 1990, Namco's Steel Gunner and Midway's Terminator 2 in 1991, and Konami's Lethal Enforcers in 1992. Further influenced by Operation Wolf, the genre remained popular into the late 1990s and declined following the rise of the first-person shooter (FPS) genre.

Operation Wolf spawned three sequels: Operation Thunderbolt (1988), Operation Wolf 3 (1994) and Operation Tiger (1998), and the remake Operation Wolf Returns: First Mission (2023).
