= King of the Monsters 2 =

1992 video game

- Developers: SNK: Now Production (SNES); Betop (Genesis)
- Publisher: SNK: Takara (Genesis/SNES)
- Producer: Eikichi Kawasaki
- Designers: Bobo Fukumizu; Mitsuzo I. Sakai Goma
- Composers: Toshikazu Tanaka; Toshio Shimizu; Yoshihiko Kitamura
- Series: King of the Monsters
- Platforms: Arcade, Neo Geo AES, Neo Geo CD, Sega Genesis, SNES
- Release: May 25, 1992: Arcade; WW: May 25, 1992 Neo Geo AES; JP/NA: June 1, 1992 SNES; JP: December 22, 1993; NA: June 1994 Genesis; NA: 1994 Neo Geo CD; JP: September 9, 1994; NA: October 1996
- Genre: Fighting
- Modes: Single-player, multiplayer
- Arcade system: Neo Geo MVS

King of the Monsters 2 (Note: Japanese: キング・オブ・ザ・モンスターズ 2, Hepburn: Kingu Obu Za Monsutāzu 2; also known as King of the Monsters 2: The Next Thing) is a 1992 fighting game developed and published by SNK for the Neo Geo arcade and home platforms. It is a sequel to the 1991 game King of the Monsters. In this game, three of the previous game's surviving monsters return and battle across the globe against giant alien monsters that threaten the Earth. The game was later ported to the Super NES and Sega Genesis by Takara.

== Plot ==
Three years after the events of the first game, only three monsters have survived what is known in history books as the "King of the Monsters Massacre". They have become more advanced and dangerous than ever before. But now in 1999, a powerful alien monster and his wave of minions threaten to conquer the Earth. The surviving monsters must defeat the alien menace and once again prove who is the King of the Monsters.

== Gameplay ==
Gameplay screenshot

Players choose one of 3 monsters for battle, and two players can join forces to fight the monsters together. Unlike the previous game this game features side scrolling levels in areas around the world which ends in a boss battle. During the boss battle the same kind of button mashing that was featured in the first game to win grapples returns. The game consists of 7 total levels which take place in areas around the World. The game begins in American City followed by French City, Grand Canyon, Desert, Sea Bed, Lava Zone and ends in Enemy Hideout. After the player(s) clear the first 6 levels, they then enter the final stage where they must fight all the bosses again before encountering the final boss of the game. After the final boss is defeated the player(s) must destroy his small remnants within a time limit. If the player(s) fail to do so, the game has a "bad ending", but if the remnants are destroyed within the time limit the player(s) receive the "good ending".

== Characters ==
=== Playable Monsters ===
Three of the previous game's monsters return with modified bodies, powers, and names.

- Super Geon: Geon returns from the first game, now mutated and appearing more dragon-like.
- Cyber Woo: Woo returns from the first game now refurbished into a cyborg resembling Mechani-Kong.
- Atomic Guy: Astro Guy returns from the first game now more powered up and with a new costume.

=== Bosses ===
The boss monsters had different names in the Japanese and American/European ports of the game:

- Huge Keal (Japanese) or Huge Frogger (American/European): The Stage 1 boss. A huge humanoid frog monster wearing a helmet.
- Horn du Out (Japanese) or Eifflelyte (American/European): The Stage 2 boss. A giant in a loincloth with a parasitic blob attached to his head.
- Yam a Mordon (Japanese) or Clawhead (American/European): The Stage 3 boss. A two-headed backward walking monster.
- Kili-Kili (Japanese) or Beetle Master (American/European): The Stage 4 boss. A giant insectoid monster with a domed brain for a head.
- Sack Eyes (Japanese) or Aqua Slug (American/European): The Stage 5 boss. A giant aquatic snail monster in a spiked shell.
- Eat Wow (Japanese) or Lavicus (American/European): The Stage 6 boss. A giant gremlin-like creature with an oversized mouth and nozzle-like appendage on its head with which it lays eggs that hatch into minion monsters.
- King Famardy (Japanese) or Famardy (American/European): The final boss. A massive blob monster with multiple eyes and a fetus-like organism for a tongue.

=== Lesser Monsters ===
These monsters are described as being minor aliens and will attack the player(s) throughout the various levels.

- I.T.O: Iagoly Telltale Object, a flying green cyclops head with a huge nose.
- Prototype Clawhead: A one armed winged demon.
- Eye Lips: A flying mouth and tongue (not unlike The Rolling Stones logo) with three eyes.
- Sand Worm: A burrowing pod-like worm monster found in the desert.
- Kanako: A flying one eyed blob monster.
- P-Head: A worm-like monster in a conch shell.
- Gapurin: A gigantic burrowing monster not unlike an Antlion larvae that causes sand pit traps.
- Shark Fin: A shark-like monster with an oversized dorsal fin.
- Blade Ray: A razor finned ray-like monster shaped like a crescent.
- Exploding Urchin: A sea urchin with an angry human-like face that explodes like a mine.
- Lucky Water: A jellyfish-like monster.
- Pujimond: A monster the resembles a Flying saucer.
- Dragon Skull: A flying dragon skull with multiple eyes.

== Ports ==
The game was released for the Neo Geo AES on June 1, 1992, and was ported to the Neo Geo CD (in Japan only) on September 9, 1994 (as a launch title). The game was ported to the SNES on December 22, 1993, and Sega Genesis exclusively in North America on 1994 by Takara. The Genesis version was developed by Betop and differs significantly from the original version of the game. Rather than being a side-scrolling beat 'em up, this version plays like a one on one fighting game. This version also gives the player the ability to play as the various boss monsters. All characters (excluding Famardy) are playable and have all been given special attacks executed using standard fighting game motions. Players must destroy all other monsters, one after the other, without any of the scrolling stages in the Neo-Geo version and then defeat a clone of the player's monster to win the game. This version of the game also takes place in 3 extra cities in Kyoto City, Tokyo City, and Osaka City.

== Reception ==
Reception

Review scores
Publication	Score
AllGame	ARC: 1.5/5; SNES: 3.5/5; SMD: 3/5; Neo Geo: 2.5/5
Electronic Gaming Monthly	NEOGEO: 23/40; SMD: 39/50; SNES: 29/40
GameFan	240/300
GamePro	NEOGEO: 17/20; SMD: 10/20; SNES: 11.5/20
GameZone	55/100
HobbyConsolas	89/100
Nintendo Power	12.5/20
Official Nintendo Magazine	64/100
Sinclair User	57/100
VideoGames & Computer Entertainment	NEOGOE: 7/10; SMD: 6/10
Flux	6/10
Mega	48%
MegaTech	69%

In Japan, Game Machine listed King of the Monsters 2 on their July 1, 1992 issue as being the eleventh most-successful table arcade unit of the month. RePlay also reported the game to be the eleventh most-popular arcade game at the time.

== Other appearances ==
In 2005, Cyber Woo, Super Geon, and Atomic Guy were featured in the SNK Playmore game NeoGeo Battle Coliseum, a fighting game featuring many of the company's popular characters. These characters also appeared as character cards in the DS game SNK vs Capcom: Card Fighters DS. In 2018, the game was ported to the Nintendo Switch Shop by Hamster as part of their Arcade Archives line. The port features two extra features in a High Score Mode and Caravan Mode.
