= Knights of Valour =

1999 video game

- Title screen of Knights of Valour (1999)
- Publisher: International Games System
- Platforms: Arcade, Mobile App
- Release: 1999
- Genre: Beat 'em up
- Arcade system: PolyGame Master

Knights of Valour (simplified Chinese: 三国战纪; traditional Chinese: 三國戰紀; pinyin: Sān Guó Zhàn Jì) is a side-scrolling beat 'em up video game series released by International Games System (IGS). The plot is loosely adapted from the 14th century Chinese historical novel Romance of the Three Kingdoms by Luo Guanzhong, and features the Five Tiger Generals, Zhuge Liang, Diaochan and others as playable characters. The gameplay involves the use of magical powers that are not featured in other games also based on the novel.

The series includes eleven games, including five main titles: Knights of Valour (1999), Knights of Valour 2 (2000), Knights of Valour: The Seven Spirits (2003), Knights of Valour 3 (2011), and the remade Knights of Valour (2015). The original games were developed for arcades and released in Traditional Chinese, Simplified Chinese, Japanese, Korean and English. All but two games in the series ran on the IGS' own PolyGame Master arcade hardware, the exceptions being KOV The Seven Spirits, which was released on Sammy Corporation's Atomiswave (later received a homebrew port for the Dreamcast in 2020), and the Knights of Valour 3D iteration, which was released online for PlayStation 4 and mobile.

A 3D installment of Knights of Valour for the PlayStation 4, as a free-to-play game, was originally slated for release in Spring 2015 in Asia and Japan, but was delayed to a summer release. The game is monetized by selling the ability to continue after being defeated and supports up to four players online. A beta version was released for trial for PlayStation Plus subscribers on the PS4. GamesInFlame acquired the rights to publish the game in Europe and Australia.

In April 2023, IGS released the IGS Classic Arcade Collection on the Nintendo Switch, a compilation of eight games originally created for the IGS PolyGame Master. Included in the collection are Knights of Valour Plus, Knights of Valour Superheroes and Knights of Valour 2 - Nine Dragons.

== Characters ==
Character	Knights of Valour (1999)	KOV Plus (1999)	KOV Superheroes (1999)	KOV2 (2000)	KOV2 Nine Dragons (2001)	KOV The Seven Spirits (2003)	KOV Superheroes Plus (2004)	KOV2 New Legend (2008)	KOV3 (2011)	Knights of Valour (3D) (2015)
Zhao Yun	✓		✓	✓	✓	✓	✓	✓	✓	✓
Guan Yu	✓		✓	✓	✓	✓	✓	✓	✓	✓
Zhang Fei	✓		✓	✓	✓	✓	✓	✓	✓	✓
Ma Chao	✓		✓	✓	✓		✓	✓	✓	✓
Huang Zhong	✓		✓	✓	✓		✓	✓		✓
Zhuge Liang	✓		✓	✓	✓	✓	✓	✓	✓	✓
Diaochan	✓		✓	✓	✓	✓	✓	✓	✓	✓
Zhang Liao	✓		✓	✓			✓	✓		✓
Lu Xun			✓						✓	
Xu Chu			✓	✓			✓	✓		✓
Pang Tong				✓	✓			✓		
Sun Quan				✓	✓			✓		
Lü Bu				✓		✓		✓	✓	✓
Lü Shuangshuang						✓				
Zhou Yu									✓	✓
Liu Bei									✓	
Huang Yun									✓	✓
Zhou Tai				✓				✓		✓
Cao Zhang										✓
Sun Shangxiang										✓
Xiahou Yuan				✓						✓
Shamoke				✓				✓		✓
Meng Huo				✓				✓		✓
Wei Yan										✓
Xiahou Dun				✓				✓		✓
Ma Dai										✓
Lü Meng				✓				✓		✓
Huang Gai				✓				✓		✓
Cao Ren				✓				✓		✓
Gan Ning				✓				✓		✓
Zhen Ji										✓
Xiaoqiao										✓
Zhang He				✓				✓		✓
Guo Jia										✓
Daqiao										✓
Huang Yueying										✓
Pang De										✓
Sun Ce										✓
Jiang Wei										✓
Sima Yi				✓				✓		✓
Niu Jin				✓				✓		✓
Xu Huang				✓				✓		
Cheng Yu				✓				✓		
Cao Cao				✓				✓		✓
Zuo Ci				✓				✓		✓
Inugami (犬神)								✓		
Himiko								✓		

== Games released ==
English title	Chinese title	System	Year
Knights of Valour	三國戰紀 三国战纪; Sānguó Zhàn Jì	IGS PGM	1999
Knights of Valour Plus	三國戰紀正宗PLUS 三国战纪正宗PLUS; Sānguó Zhàn Jì Zhèngzōng Plus	IGS PGM	1999
Knights of Valour Superheroes	三國戰紀:風雲再起 三国战纪:风云再起; Sānguó Zhàn Jì - Fēngyún Zàiqǐ	IGS PGM	1999
Knights of Valour 2	三國戰紀2 三国战纪2; Sānguó Zhàn Jì 2	IGS PGM	2000
Knights of Valour 2 - Nine Dragons	三國戰紀2:群雄爭霸 三国战纪2:群雄争霸; Sānguó Zhàn Jì 2 - Qúnxióng Zhēngbà	IGS PGM	2001
Knights of Valour: The Seven Spirits	新·三國戰紀:七星轉生 新·三国战纪:七星转生; Xīn Sānguó Zhàn Jì - Qīxīng Zhuǎnshēng 新·三国戦紀:七星転生; Shin Sangoku Senki - Shichisei Tensei	Sammy Atomiswave	2003
Knights of Valour Superheroes Plus	亂世梟雄 乱世枭雄; Luànshì Xiāoxióng	IGS PGM	2004 (China exclusive)
Knights of Valour 2 - New Legend	三國戰紀2:橫掃千軍 三国战纪2:横扫千军; Sānguó Zhàn Jì 2 - Héngsǎo Qiān Jūn	IGS PGM2	2008
Knights of Valour 3	三國戰紀3 三国战纪3; Sānguó Zhàn Jì 3	IGS PGM2	2011 (China exclusive)
Knights of Valour 3 HD	三國戰紀3 HD 三国战纪3 HD; Sānguó Zhàn Jì 3 HD	IGS PGM3	2012 (China exclusive)
Knights of Valour	三國戰紀 三国战纪; Sānguó Zhàn Jì	PlayStation 4	2015
