= Operation Thunderbolt (video game) =

1988 video game

- Japanese arcade flyer
- Developer: Taito (Note: Home computer versions developed by Ocean Software; SNES version developed by Aisystem Tokyo.)
- Publishers: Taito; Home computers Ocean Software
- Designers: Junji Yarita; Hiroyuki Sako
- Programmers: Daisuke Sasaki; Akira Ōtsuki; Youzou Koma; Tatsuo Nakamura; Shinji Soyano
- Artists: Hiroyasu Nagai; Osamu Matsuura; Junji Yarita; Yoshihiko Wakita; Minori Ishino; Taira Sanuki; Hisakazu Kato
- Composer: Shizuo Aizawa
- Series: Operation Wolf
- Platforms: Arcade, Amiga, Amstrad CPC, Atari ST, Commodore 64, ZX Spectrum, GX4000, Super NES
- Release: December 1988: Arcade; JP: December 1988; NA: February 1989 Amiga, Atari ST, C64, CPC, ZX Spectrum; EU: December 1989 GX4000; EU: 1993 Super NES; NA: October 1994
- Genre: Light gun shooter
- Modes: Single-player, multiplayer

Operation Thunderbolt (Japanese: オペレーションサンダーボルト) is a 1988 light gun shooter video game developed and published by Taito for arcades. As the sequel to Operation Wolf, changes include two-player gameplay with two positional gun controllers mounted on the arcade cabinet, and a new forward-scrolling pseudo-3D perspective combined with side-scrolling sections.

The arcade game was a commercial success and was one of the top three highest-grossing dedicated arcade games of 1989 in both Japan and the United States. Versions were released for Amiga, Commodore 64, and Super Nintendo Entertainment System. The arcade-exclusive sequel Operation Wolf 3 was released in 1994.

== Gameplay ==
Green berets Roy Adams and Hardy Jones must save American hostages from a hijacked airliner which was forced to land in the fictional African province, Kalubya. They must capture six different bases, shoot enemies with machine guns or grenade launcher, and try to save the hostages. Enemies include soldiers, jeeps, tanks, and helicopters, attacking with bullets, grenades, or rockets.

In stages 4 and 6, killing one of the hostages will decrease the player's life. At least one hostage must be rescued in those stages, or the game is over. In Stage 8, the players must engage with the lead hijacker holding the pilot hostage. Continues are not permitted. If the pilot gets killed, a bad ending will be shown "The pilot is dead; escape is impossible". If the hijacker is killed, the good ending will be shown where the player and hostages flee the hostile nation, with the plane's takeoff.

Changes from Operation Wolf include the arcade cabinet using positional gun controllers instead of light gun, two-player simultaneous play with two mounted guns, and a new forward-scrolling pseudo-3D perspective combined with side-scrolling sections.

== Ports ==
The Super NES version

Ocean Software published conversions of Operation Thunderbolt for the Amiga, Amstrad CPC, Atari ST, Commodore 64, and ZX Spectrum in 1989. A cartridge version for the GX4000 followed in 1993.

The Super NES version was released by Taito in 1994 and works with the SNES Mouse and the Super Scope. The player can choose from a variety of different characters. The storyline was altered so that the hijackers were members of the fictional Bintazi People's Republic, under lifelong dictator General Abul Bazarre, who demands that his comrades be freed or the hostages will be executed.

== Influence ==
The story for the game is loosely based on the plot of the film by the same name, which in turn was based on the real-life Entebbe raid that occurred on July 4, 1976.

== Reception ==
Reception

Review scores
Publication	Score				
Publication	Amiga	Arcade	PC	SNES	ZX
ACE	927		815 (CPC)		805
Crash		Positive			91%
Computer and Video Games		Positive	80% (CPC)		80%
GamePro				16/20	
Next Generation				2/5	
Sinclair User		7/10			92%
The Games Machine (UK)		Positive			91%
Your Sinclair					93%
Commodore User		9/10			

Awards
Publication	Award
Crash	Best Graphics, Crash Smash
UK game industry	Best 16-bit arcade license translation
Sinclair User	SU Classic
Your Sinclair	Megagame
Zzap!64	Gold Medal

In Japan, Game Machine listed Operation Thunderbolt as the second most successful upright arcade unit of January 1989. It became Japan's second highest-grossing dedicated arcade game of 1989, below Chase H.Q. In the United States, Operation Thunderbolt was the third highest-grossing dedicated arcade game of 1989. Operation Thunderbolt was also Japan's eighth highest-grossing dedicated arcade game of 1990.

=== Reviews ===
The arcade game received positive reviews from critics upon release. Commodore User said it "takes all the best elements" of Operation Wolf, including "the brilliant graphics" and "action blasting", and added "a two-player option, a brand new perspective and some really clever scenario ideas".

Reviewing the Super NES version, GamePro praised the colorful and detailed graphics and strong sound effects, but criticized the repetitiveness of the gameplay and the slowness of the aiming reticule, and concluded that this Operation is a success. A reviewer for Next Generation dismissed it as another shooting-gallery game.

=== Accolades ===
The game won the 1989 award for best graphics of the year according to the readers of Crash magazine.

At a British game industry awards event held at the end of 1989, Operation Thunderbolt was awarded "Best 16-bit arcade license translation" for Ocean Software's home computer conversions.

== Legacy ==
Operation Thunderbolt is in the Taito Legends compilation for Microsoft Windows, PlayStation 2, and Xbox.

== See also ==
- Operation Wolf (1987)
- Line of Fire (1989)
- Space Gun (1990)
- Operation Gunbuster (1992)
