= Action fiction =

Written and visual fiction genre

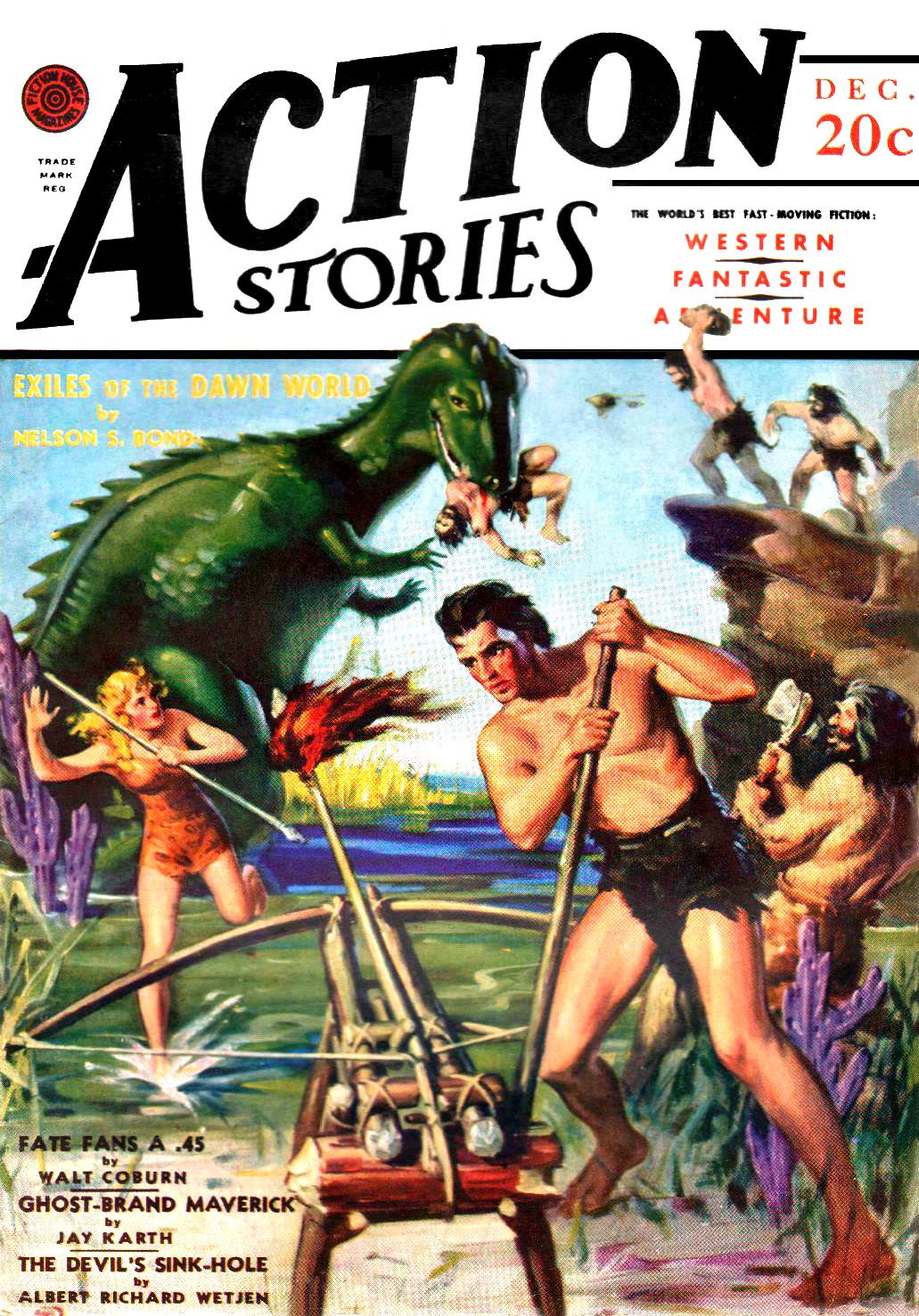
Action novels and short stories were popular subjects for American pulp magazines.

Action fiction is a genre in literature that focuses on stories involving high-stakes, high-energy, and fast-paced events. This genre includes a wide range of subgenres, such as spy novels, adventure stories, tales of terror, intrigue ("cloak and dagger"), and mysteries. These kinds of stories use suspense, the tension that is built up when the reader wishes to know how the conflict between the protagonist and antagonist is going to be resolved or the solution to a mystery of a thriller.

The intricacies of human relationships or the nuances of philosophy and psychology are rarely explored in action fiction, typically being fast-paced mysteries that merely seek to provide the reader with an exhilarating experience.

Action fiction can also be a plot element of non-literary works such as graphic novels and film.

== Action genre ==
Action genre is a form of fiction whose subject matter is characterized by emphasis on exciting action sequences. This does not always mean they exclude character development or story-telling.

The action genre is also related to non-literary media including comic books, graphic novels (such as manga), anime, action film, action television series, and action games. It includes martial arts action, extreme sports action, car chases and vehicles, hand-to-hand combat, suspense action, and action comedy, with each focusing in more detail on its own type and flavor of action.

It is usually possible to identify the creative style of an action sequence, the emphasis of an entire work, so that, for example, the style of a combat sequence will indicate whether the entire work can be classified as action-adventure. Action is mainly defined by a central focus on any kind of exciting movement.

== See also ==
- Action-adventure game
- Action hero
- List of genres
- List of female action heroes and villains
- List of male action heroes and villains
- Lists of action films
- Martial arts film
- Pace (narrative)
- Spy fiction
- Thriller novel
