= List of action heroes and villains =

Below are lists of action heroes and villains in various media.

- List of female action heroes and villains
- List of male action heroes and villains
