= The Ocean Hunter =

1998 video game

- Arcade poster
- Developer: Sega
- Publisher: Sega
- Director: Shinichiro Okumoto
- Producer: Rikiya Nakagawa
- Composer: Masanori Takeuchi
- Platform: Arcade
- Release: JP: September 1998; WW: October 1998
- Genre: Rail shooter
- Modes: Single-player, Multiplayer
- Arcade system: Sega Model 3

The Ocean Hunter (オーシャンハンター) (also known as The Ocean Hunter: The Seven Seas Adventure) is a 1998 shooting gallery game developed and published by Sega. It runs on Sega Model 3 hardware. The cabinet features artistic renditions of the bosses of the game, some with faux Greek names: Οχτοπυσ (actual Greek would be Όκτώπους); Λεϖιατηαν (actual Greek would be Λευιαθάν) and Χψχλοπσ (actual Greek would be Κύκλωψ).

== Plot ==
A new civilization is flourishing in the seas of an alternate steampunk world, but giant ocean monsters are attacking shipping vessels, harbors, humans and native marine life with increasing frequency. Ordinary marine predators such as sharks have begun to follow in the sea monsters' wake to scavenge what they could from the destruction caused. Frightened for their lives, the people issue bounties on the monsters' heads. The underwater adventurers Torel (Player 1) and Chris (Player 2) head out to defeat the horrible creatures.

== Gameplay ==
The Ocean Hunter is played by using two mounted turret-like guns on the arcade cabinet. The game is capable of being played with either one or two people simultaneously. The player takes the role of an underwater adventurer searching for the Seven Great Monsters of the Seven Seas, hoping to collect the bounties placed on their heads for attacks on shipping vessels, humans and native marine life. The player proceeds to go throughout the game in a set path, shooting at various hostile ocean life along the way. The game is played progressing through various levels, each with its own design and layout, often incorporating the idea of sunken ships, underwater temples or cities of civilizations long gone. Upon reaching the end of the level, a boss is encountered. Each boss is named after a famous mythological sea monster with the final boss taking on different forms named Dagon, Poseidon, and Rahab. There are also mini-bosses in the game, many of whom are also named after sea monsters or mythological creatures.

The Seven Seas are listed therein as:

- Baroque Sea (Pacific Ocean); boss Kraken (Octpus dofleini [sic]); reward 5,000.
- Luna Sea (Arabian Sea); boss Leviathan (Carcharodon megalodon); reward 8,000.
- Tartarus Deep (Bermuda Triangle); boss Charybdis (Melanocetus); reward 10,000.
- Texcoco Great Lake (Amazon River); boss Ahuizotl (Elasmosaurus platyurus); reward 12,000.
- North Sea (Arctic Ocean); boss Karkinos (Macrocheira kaempferi); reward 15,000.
- West Ocean (Atlantic Ocean); boss Midgardsorm (Lumbricus terrestris gigantesque [sic]); reward 18,000.
- Panthalassa (Mediterranean Sea); final boss Rahab (Gigantopithecus thalassa cyclops); reward 20,000.

After Rahab is defeated, he reveals in the game’s closing sequence that he was responsible for creating the sea monsters (except Midgardsorm, who possibly existed before the events of the game) in order to protect the oceans from human-induced pollution, and warns the player that he will return someday.

== Reception ==
In Japan, Game Machine listed The Ocean Hunter on their 15 November 1998 issue as being the fifth most-successful dedicated arcade game of the month.

== See also ==
- Let's Go Jungle!: Lost on the Island of Spice
- Transformers: Human Alliance
- Deadstorm Pirates
