= Demon hunter (disambiguation) =

Demon hunter is a demonology-related historic occupation or folkloric character which specializes in killing demons, monsters, or undead creatures.

Demon hunter or variations may also refer to:

== Characters ==
- Demon Hunter (comics), an Atlas/Seaboard Comics character
- Demon Hunters, a character class in the video game World of Warcraft: Legion

== Film ==
- Demon Hunter (film), a 2005 American action/horror film
- Demon Hunters (film), a 2024 Indian-Taiwanese action-horror-comedy film
- KPop Demon Hunters, 2025 American animated musical fantasy film

== Gaming ==
- Demon Hunters Role Playing Game, a 2008 role-playing game by Margaret Weis Productions
- Akaneiro: Demon Hunters, a 2012 video game by Spicy Horse

== Literature ==
- Queen Victoria: Demon Hunter, a 2009 novel by A. E. Moorat
- Yamada Monogatari: Demon Hunter, a 2013 short story collection by Richard Parks

== Music ==
- Demon Hunter (band), an American Christian metal band
  - Demon Hunter (album), 2002

== See also ==
- Devil Hunter (disambiguation)
- Demon Slayer (disambiguation)
