= Action hero =

Archetypal protagonist of action-genre fiction

An action hero (sometimes action heroine or action girl for women) is the protagonist of an action film or other form of entertainment which portrays action, adventure, and often violence. Action heroes are depicted in exciting or perilous chase sequences, fights, shootouts, explosions, and stunt work. Other media in which such heroes appear include swashbuckler films, Western films, old-time radio, adventure novels, dime novels, pulp magazines, and folklore.

== History ==
The origin of the action hero is rooted in the history of imperialism with adventure stories being primarily written for boys, to imagine being men on travels and experiencing exciting action. Shawn Shimpach wrote, "The young, white men who were (or became) the aggrandized subjects of these stories motivated the narratives through their penchant for action and resolved conflict through violence informed by grit, wits, and innate skill, securing, in each story, the future of the world for which they were responsible and in the process confirming their masculine identity." In the early twentieth century, this storytelling was commercialized, and the stories were "readily adapted" to film. One of the earliest action-hero actors was Douglas Fairbanks. In the Chicago Tribune, Donald Liebenson wrote, "Douglas Fairbanks was Hollywood's first major action hero, best known for the costume epics that established him as the screen's most dashing swashbuckler." One of the defining action-hero characters played by Fairbanks was Zorro, which Michael Sragow called "the most influential action figure in film history and the happiest movie warrior of all time". Fairbanks was followed by Errol Flynn, who achieved fame as Robin Hood in the 1938 film The Adventures of Robin Hood.

In the middle of the twentieth century, "...the action genre was predictably populated by suave, attractive heroes living adventures of thrilling, exotic excitement, unimpeded by (if clearly aligned to) national, cultural, or state borders." When television became commonplace, shows that featured action heroes included Adventures of Superman (1952–1958), The Avengers (1961–1969), The Saint (1962–1969), The Man from U.N.C.L.E. (1964–1968), Batman (1966–1968), and Mission: Impossible (1966–1973). Shimpach said they "offered up extraordinary (if not always completely serious) white men who resolved conflict through direct action and violence while displaying their effortless mastery of urban spaces, new technologies, fashion, and their own bodies."

== See also ==
- List of action film actors
- List of female action heroes and villains
- List of male action heroes and villains
- Anandalok Best Action Hero Award
- Bruceploitation
- Lists of superheroes
