= Let's Go Jungle!: Lost on the Island of Spice =

2006 video game

- Arcade flyer (2006)
- Developer: Sega
- Publisher: Sega
- Director: Shinichi Ogasawara
- Producer: Masanori Oe
- Artist: Rie Sakurai
- Composer: Takenobu Mitsuyoshi
- Platform: Arcade
- Release: JP: December 14, 2006
- Genre: Shooter
- Modes: Single player, multiplayer
- Arcade system: Sega Lindbergh

Let's Go Jungle!: Lost on the Island of Spice is a joystick-mounted gun arcade game by Sega. Players take the roles of Ben and Norah stranded on a jungle island which has been overrun by monsters. Each player must shoot the monsters with their machine gun while looking for rescue.

There is a version of the game called Let's Go Jungle! Special, in which players sit on a revolving seat with a large projection screen in front and another in back. This version also serves as a spiritual sequel to The House of the Dead 4 Special.

A sequel called Let's Go Island: Lost on the Island of Tropics 3D, was released in mid-2011. A spiritual sequel, Transformers: Human Alliance, was released in 2013.

== Gameplay ==
Let's Go Jungle!: Lost on the Island of Spice is an on-rails arcade shooter. Players assume the roles of dysfunctional couple Ben and Norah, who are going on an island tour to work out their problems. Co-op is available as a mode of play, though one may play alone as well. Players must make their way across the island of Spice, while killing mutated animals and insects, such as frogs, leeches, spiders, water bugs, piranhas, pillbugs, fleas, and flies, along the way. The players are given FN FAL assault rifles early in the game to fend off the creatures, and this will be the primary weapon for use against the creatures. However, sometimes improvised weapons, such as paddles and slingshots, will have to be used. All weapons are controlled by a light gun controller on a mounted fulcrum, similar to another Sega on-rail shooter, The Ocean Hunter. The "Deluxe" Arcade Cabinet allows players to sit inside a model offroad truck.

Some parts of every level are quick-time events, where players must move the gun in a certain direction, rapidly tap a button or tap a button at the right time to survive a dangerous situation. Higher points are awarded for executing quick-time events sooner, where failure will cause the player's life bar to decrease, although the bar will drop to 1% (and stay there) if the player missed a quick-time event with only a little bit of life remaining, as it is not possible for a game over to occur during any particular sequence of quick-time events.

At the end of each stage, the player must battle a boss, which is usually a heavily mutated and powerful monster. To attack it, the player must quickly shoot at each of several indicated target points that are marked on the boss until they disappear. Failure to hit all targets within a short period of time will allow the boss to attack the player and deal massive damage, while hitting all targets will deal damage to the boss and disrupt its attempted attack. Bosses are extremely powerful such that the player can only survive at most two attacks from a boss before having to continue.

Similar to The House of the Dead 4 Special, the games co-op gives a compatibility rating based on how well the two players work together. Enemies include various bugs, spiders, piranhas and frogs. The font style of the texts used throughout the game is based on the Thai alphabet.

== Plot ==
Ben and Norah - whose relationship is floundering - tour an island in Asia called Amoi Island. While touring on a Jeep, the pair encounters group of giant jumping spiders. One of the guides is killed and another gives them FN FAL assault rifles, which they use to defend themselves against the swarm of spiders. During the pursuit, another tour guide is killed while Ben and Norah encounter another group of tourists fleeing a swarm of mutant hornets and dragonflies. Eventually, their vehicle goes off road and crashes. While the couple momentarily questions the driver, he flees the vehicle in panic as a giant tarantula emerges behind. They manage to escape by driving the vehicle over a broken bridge, jumping over a cliff in the process. Ben pulls out his map and shows two options on where to head next: through a cave or a river.

If the player(s) choose(s) the cave, Ben and Norah finds a rock arrangement reading "SOS," discovering the same trio of survivors from earlier. They all escape the cave by sliding down a cave waterslide, but the other tourist out of frustration with Ben and Norah, declares himself the leader, taking their guns. Before they can protest further, a rescue helicopter is seen flying over. Ben and Norah are temporarily given slingshots to defend themselves. Eventually, they reach an abandoned temple where the helicopter landed but find that it's full with the trio of survivors. The pilot informs them that there is another extraction point in a nearby village from which they can evacuate the island and are given their guns back. As the helicopter takes off, they are attacked by a giant mantis. Upon killing the mantis, they discover that they're standing in front of a Buddha shrine, to which Norah comments: "It really is mysterious Asia".

If the player(s) choose(s) the river, Ben and Norah take a canoe down the river and are attacked by giant poisonous tree frogs. At one point, they lose their guns in the waterfall and have to use oars to defend themselves. Eventually, they find another pair of guns and fight a giant mutant bullfrog. They kill the frog by shooting a tall propane tank near the frog. They also find a radio that tells anyone listening about a nearby village where they can escape via helicopter.

On the third stage (which is compulsory to play on), the player(s) travel through an abandoned village, only to be attacked by more mutated jumping spiders, fleas, giant pillbugs, schools of piranhas, tree frogs, water bugs, and having to avoid drawing attention from another large purple tarantula (similar to the one seen in the first stage). They discover a young boy on his elephant being attacked by the mutated fleas, forcing Ben and Norah to hit them off the elephant with the buttstock of their rifles. The boy then thanks them by letting them ride his elephant to the extraction point. On the way, they encounter yet the same tarantula, this time with mushrooms growing out of its back. The player injures it but does not kill it. Instead, it falls off the cliff, right into the sea.

Ben and Norah make it to the temple. The boy tells a simple backstory and explains the temple was for the natives first, soldiers next, and then "good people" last. They're then interrupted by spiders and the same infected tarantula, which lunges at the player(s) from above. When the player(s) kill it, the tarantula falls into the Buddhist shrine and detonates several barrels of toxic waste in the process, resulting in the lily plant pods around the shrine to become contaminated and grow teeth. They then merge into one giant mutant plant, which the player must fight. It's eventually defeated with help from the boy, who commands his elephant to kick a propane tank at the plant, which the player must continuously shoot until it explodes and kills the plant. After the battle, the boy thanks Ben and Norah by giving Norah his good luck charm that keeps the bugs at bay. They're then rescued by another helicopter and as they fly out, several butterflies land on the head of the Buddha statue (which is supposedly still contaminated from the barrels).

While onboard, Ben and Norah learn from the helicopter pilot about the island. An environmental NGO called "Green Leaves", came to the island after it was devastated by war. Following the motto of "bring back the green", scientists of Green Leaves discovered a species of mushroom that possessed extraordinary biological regenerative properties. The scientists extracted and refined the mushrooms' essence, creating a powerful chemical extract that could accelerate biological growth. In cooperation with the island's natives, Green Leaves used the extract to restore the island's fauna and flora within five years. However, it was later discovered that the extract's properties also had an unintended side effect of enlarging, mutating, and corrupting any treated organisms, turning them into large dangerous monsters, forcing the personnel and many of the natives to abandon the island, although a few decided to stay.

As they rest, the two are interrupted and forced into a battle with a giant mutated butterfly and its butterfly army. Just as they come close to killing the butterfly, it launches one desperate attack that blows the two out of the helicopter, dropping their guns into the ocean and barely clinging onto a rope ladder. Without any other weapons, the two must use a slingshot and the good luck charm to deliver the final blow. If the player(s) fail to deliver the final blow, the butterfly escapes the island and the two of them will end their relationship, while a mushroom grows out of the neck of the pilot. If the player(s) successfully make the shot, the butterfly is killed and agree to give their relationship another try. The pilot being infected is omitted in this ending.

== Reception ==
The title featured in 16th place in a 2022 Retro Gamer list of the Top 25 Light Gun Games, with critic Ashley Day praising its co-operative play and compatibility mechanic whereby players are rewarded for shooting in sync with one another.

== Let's Go Island: Lost on the Island of Tropics ==
Released in mid-2011, this is the sequel to the game. Taking place on a Pacific island, the protagonists are a goofball New Zealander guide called Zack and a nerdy Canadian girl called Beth. While on a tour, their tour boat collides with another boat with a small group of pirates landing on the boat after crashing and are being chased by sharks after landing in the sea. Beth and Zack fight the sharks with the pirates' weapons (water gun or AKS-74U, depending on how the game is configured), but the pirates fall off the boat. Then, the captain tells both Zack and Beth that "we hit the reef," but the boat is able to dodge the obstacles. As the protagonists jump off the boat and the boat crashes through the dock, they grab a rope and go through a short underwater adventure with mutant starfish, squids, and other sea creatures. After the rope cuts off, both go up to the sea surface with a windsurfing board. There, the captain is killed by a gigantic octopus.

Though the duo manage to escape from the octopus and survive a big wave, they must go to an airport in order to get off the island. Either they go by a scooter in the OpaOpa Villa and Resort, jet ski in unfinished underground concert hall, or the buggy to the South Island Golf Course while surviving mutant creatures from air, land, and sea. As they adventure through, the abandoned island is revealed to have a backstory. Before the game, Zack became an employee and worked at the resort. After a financial crisis came into the resort, the resort went out of business and Zack was sacked, closing down the entire island and changing Zack's career. As they travel to the airport, they lose their weapons, but find other items that can be treated as temporary firearms.

When they arrive and board a biplane after surviving the second level with temporary weapons, the pilot demands "to show them what they have" mistaking them for the pirates. Beth wonders what is the pilot talking about, but the plane gets attacked by a giant queen bee. As the plane tries to fly, the weight is too much and the pilot forces the duo to get off. Both Zack and Beth jump off the plane, then to a cliff with a parafoil in the bag. After defeating the giant queen bee, they survive the fall.

Zack and Beth are then "rescued" and kidnapped by the pirate leader, and are forced to retrieve some treasure from beneath the sea, which the leader is told of by the pilot. As they swim, they encounter stingrays, jellyfish, and starfish that attack, then meet a dolphin. Later, and when they hit the bottom of the ocean, they find another dolphin trapped in the net and the octopus from before, which had survived. Zack and Beth lift the net, free the dolphin, and get the tube. Both swim to the top as the octopus puts up a fight with a backup team of squids. After retrieving the treasure and ending the octopus once and for all, the pirates are shocked to see that the tube they sought does not contain treasure. Luckily, a lighter was in a tube and was in working condition, which Beth didn't care about. The leader flies into a fit rage, saying that the pilot lied to them, and kicks an old "Green Leaves" barrel filled with ominous chemicals, which he'd somehow stole and stowed on board. The chemicals spread to a field of coral, creating a giant monster. Zack and Beth fight back by using the boats cranes and then get a ride with the dolphins they rescued, starting a chase. After the chase, the coral monster grabs them and attacks by using its barnacle teeth, the duo then shoot at the monsters mouth revealing oil inside of it.

After the monster throws them near the plane's crash site by a sneeze, they lost their weapons, making Zack lose his confidence until Beth motivates Zack. They manage to kill the monster by shooting it with a firework into its mouth. When they blow up the monster, its remains break up into debris and rain gold, which happens to be the actual treasure. While being stranded at sea after the battle and awaiting rescue, the two then began to start a relationship as they face toward a sunset before the credits begin to roll. In another good ending if both players get an average score from 90 to 100, Zack removes Beth's broken glasses to reveal Beth's pretty face. This is also triggered if one player beats a game with a perfect S rank, but should they fail to hit the target, the monster will chase after the firework and the two will not develop romance, with Zack responding to Beth they will not get to land until she pays him for his extra services, triggering a bad ending.

== See also ==
- The Ocean Hunter
- Deadstorm Pirates
