= List of female action heroes and villains =

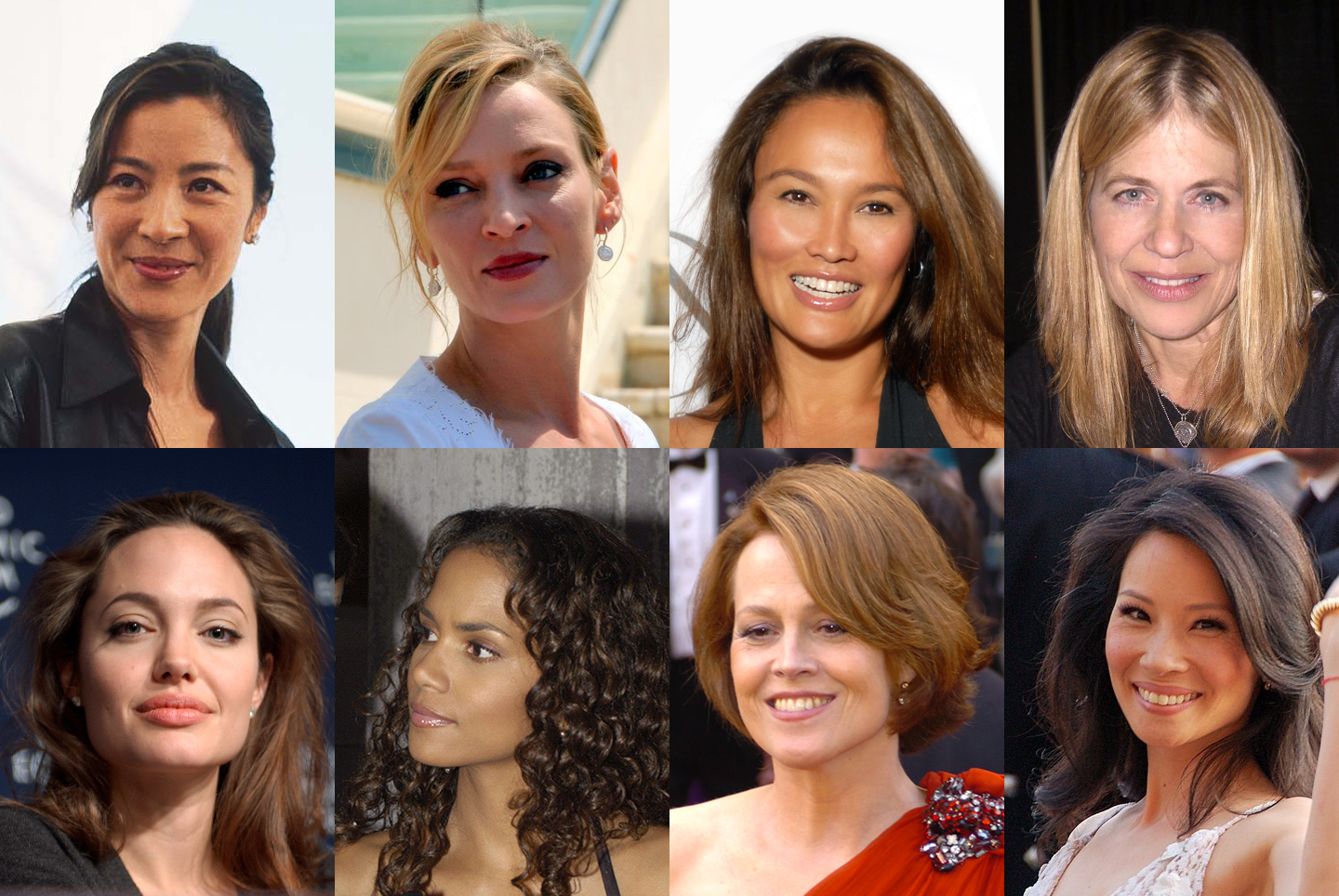
A montage of actresses who have played female action heroes. From top left: Michelle Yeoh, Uma Thurman, Tia Carrere, Linda Hamilton, Angelina Jolie, Halle Berry, Sigourney Weaver, and Lucy Liu.

Are female action heroes truly empowering? – Dan Hassler-Forest (Utrecht University)

The following is a list of female action heroes and villains who appear in action films, television shows, comic books, and video games and who are "thrust into a series of challenges requiring physical feats, extended fights, extensive stunts and frenetic chases."

Elizabeth Abele suggests that "the key agency of female action protagonists is their ability to draw on the full range of masculine and feminine qualities in ever-evolving combinations."

== Films ==
=== Animated theatrical films ===
- Ahsoka Tano from Star Wars: The Clone Wars
- Elsa and Anna from Frozen series and Once Upon a Time
- Princess Fiona from the Shrek series (2001–2010), Queen Lillian and the Fairy Godmother from Shrek 2, and Snow White, Cinderella, and Sleeping Beauty from Shrek the Third (2007)
- Elastigirl and Violet (2004) from The Incredibles (2004)
- Iria from Iria: Zeiram the Animation
- Judy Hopps from Zootopia (2016)
- Karai from TMNT
- Kay from Akira
- Kida and Helga Sinclair from Atlantis: The Lost Empire (2001)
- Merida from Brave (2012) and Once Upon a Time
- Moana from Moana
- Motoko Kusanagi from Ghost in the Shell
- Mulan from Mulan (1998) and Mulan II (2004)
- Nausicaä from Nausicaä of the Valley of the Wind
- Raya from Raya and the Last Dragon (2020)
- Ryôko Kadoma from Goku Midnight Eye
- Sabine Wren from Star Wars Rebels and Ahsoka
- San from Princess Mononoke
- Susan Murphy/Ginormica from Monsters vs. Aliens (2009)
- Saya from Blood: The Last Vampire
- Saki Asamiya from Sukeban Deka (Original video animation)
- Taarna from Heavy Metal (1981)
- April O'Neil from TMNT
- Liz Sherman from Hellboy: Sword of Storms, Hellboy: Blood and Iron
- Astrid Hofferson, Ruffnut Thorston and Valka from How to Train Your Dragon.
- Tigress, Viper and Zhen from Kung Fu Panda

=== Live-action theatrical films ===
- Æon Flux from Æon Flux (2005)
- Abigail Whistler from Blade: Trinity (2004)
- Alex Munday from Charlie's Angels (2000) and Charlie's Angels: Full Throttle (2003)
- Alice Kingsleigh from Alice in Wonderland and Alice Through the Looking Glass
- Alice Monaghan from Hellboy
- Alice, character from Resident Evil
- Angelica Teach from Pirates of the Caribbean: On Stranger Tides
- Ann Lewis from RoboCop
- April O'Neil from Teenage Mutant Ninja Turtles, Teenage Mutant Ninja Turtles: Out of the Shadows
- Arwen and Eowyn from The Lord of the Rings trilogy
- Artemisia from 300: Rise of an Empire (2014)
- Ava from In the Blood (2014)
- Babydoll from Sucker Punch (2011)
- Beatrix Kiddo from Kill Bill (2003–2004)
- Buffy Summers from Buffy the Vampire Slayer (1992)
- Black Whip from Zorro's Black Whip (1944)
- Blue from Jurassic World (2015), Jurassic World: Fallen Kingdom (2018), Jurassic World Camp Cretaceous (2020–2022), and Jurassic World Dominion (2022)
- Bugs from The Matrix Resurrections (2021)
- Carly Spencer from Transformers: Dark of the Moon
- Captain Frankie Cook from Sky Captain and the World of Tomorrow (2004)
- Charlene "Charly" Baltimore/Samantha Caine from The Long Kiss Goodnight (1996 film)
- Charlie Watson from Bumblebee
- Cherry Darling from Grindhouse (2007)
- Coffy from Coffy (1973)
- Daphne Blake from Scooby-Doo (2002) and Scooby-Doo 2: Monsters Unleashed (2004)
- Dylan Sanders from Charlie's Angels (2000) and Charlie's Angels: Full Throttle (2003)
- Dominika Egorova from Red Sparrow (2018)
- Domino from Domino (2005)
- Elena Santos from Battle: Los Angeles (2011)
- Elizabeth "Liz" Sherman from Hellboy (2004)
- Elizabeth Swann from the Pirates of the Caribbean series (2003–2017)
- Ellen "The Lady" from The Quick and the Dead (1995)
- Ellen Ripley from the Alien series (1979–1997)
- Ellie Sattler from Jurassic Park series
- Etain from Centurion (2010)
- Everly from Everly (2014)
- Evelyn Carnahan from The Mummy and The Mummy Returns and The Mummy: Tomb of the Dragon Emperor)
- Evelyn Salt from Salt (2010)
- Fox from Wanted (2008)
- Foxy Brown from Foxy Brown (1974)
- Foxxy Cleopatra from Austin Powers in Goldmember
- G2 from Inspector Gadget 2
- Gloria Swenson from Gloria (1980)
- Gracie Hart in Miss Congeniality
- Guinevere from King Arthur (2004)
- Hanna from Hanna (2011)
- Ilsa Faust from Mission: Impossible – Rogue Nation (2015) and Fallout (2018)
- Imperator Furiosa from Mad Max: Fury Road (2015)
- Ingrid Cortez from Spy Kids series
- Inspector Jessica Yang from Supercop (1992)
- Iria from Zeiram (1991)
- Jane Smith from Mr. & Mrs. Smith (2005)
- Jackie Brown from Jackie Brown (1997)
- Jen Yu from Crouching Tiger, Hidden Dragon (2000)
- "Jinx" Giancita Johnson from Die Another Day (2002)
- Jordan O'Neil from G.I. Jane (1997)
- Julie Pierce from The Next Karate Kid (1994)
- Jyn Erso from Rogue One (2016)
- Karai from Teenage Mutant Ninja Turtles, Teenage Mutant Ninja Turtles: Out of the Shadows
- Kate Macer from Sicario (2015)
- Leeloo / The Fifth Element from The Fifth Element (1997)
- Letty Ortiz, Gisele Yashar, Elena Neves, Riley Hicks and Kara from The Fast and The Furious (2001–present)
- Lieutenant Colonel Violet van Patten and Lady Lisa from Pixels (2015)
- Lorraine Broughton from Atomic Blonde (2017)
- Lucy from Lucy (2014)
- Madame Desdemona from Machete Kills (2013)
- Mai Linh from Live Free or Die Hard (2007)
- Major Eden Sinclair from Doomsday (2008)
- Mallory Kane from Haywire (2011)
- Marie from Innocent Blood
- Mathilda from The Professional (1994)
- Mako Mori from Pacific Rim (2013)
- Madison Lee from Charlie's Angels: Full Throttle (2003)
- Marion Ravenwood from Raiders of the Lost Ark (1981)
- Marique from Conan the Barbarian (2011)
- Mei from House of Flying Daggers (2004)
- Mikaela Banes from Transformers
- Monica "Darling" Costello from Baby Driver (2017)
- Mira Killian from Ghost in the Shell (2017)
- Ms. Perkins from John Wick (2014)
- Natalie Cook from Charlie's Angels (2000) and Charlie's Angels: Full Throttle (2003)
- Newt from Aliens (1986)
- Neytiri from Avatar (2009)
- Nikita from La Femme Nikita (1990)
- Niobe from The Matrix series (2003–2021)
- Padmé Amidala from the Star Wars prequel trilogy (1999–2005)
- Pauline Hargraves from The Perils of Pauline movie serial (1933)
- Phryne Fisher from Miss Fisher and the Crypt of Tears (2020)
- Princess Leia Organa from the Star Wars original trilogy (1977–1983)
- Qi'ra from Solo: A Star Wars Story (2018)
- Quorra from Tron: Legacy (2010)
- Rey from Star Wars sequel trilogy (2015–2019)
- Ria Khan / The Fury from Polite Society (2023)
- Rosie Carver in Live and Let Die (1973)
- Riley North from Peppermint (2018)
- Ruby Roundhouse from Jumanji series
- Sarah Bailey from The Craft (1996)
- Sarah Connor from the Terminator series (1984–2019)
- Saki Asamiya from Sukeban Deka
- Saya from Blood: The Last Vampire
- Selene from the Underworld series (2003–2016)
- Sgt. Rita Rose Vrataski from Edge of Tomorrow (2014)
- Sook-hee / Chae Yeon-soo from The Villainess (2017)
- Tank Girl / Rebecca from Tank Girl (1995)
- Tauriel from The Hobbit Trilogy
- Tiger Woman from The Tiger Woman (1944)
- Tong Li from Operation Red Sea (2018)
- Torchy Blane from the Torchy Blane series (1937–1939)
- Trinity from The Matrix series (1999–2021)
- Trudy Chacón from Avatar (2009)
- Vanessa Kensington from Austin Powers: International Man of Mystery
- Yōko Godai from Sukeban Deka The Movie
- Yu Shu Lien from Crouching Tiger, Hidden Dragon (2000)
- Yuki Kashima from Lady Snowblood (1973) and Lady Snowblood 2: Love Song of Vengeance (1974)
- Yui Kazama from Sukeban Deka the Movie 2: Counter-Attack from the Kazama Sisters
- Zen from Chocolate (2008)
- Zoë Bell from Grindhouse (2007)
- The ghostbusters from Ghostbusters (2016 remake)
- The granddaughter of Egon from Ghostbusters: Afterlife
- The protagonist of The Princess

==== Films based on comic books ====
- Alice Monaghan from Hellboy (2019)
- Alita from Alita: Battle Angel (2019)
- Judge Anderson from Dredd (2012)
- Knives Chau from Scott Pilgrim vs. the World (2010)
- Liz Sherman from Hellboy (2004)
- Ramona Flowers from Scott Pilgrim vs. the World (2010)
- Hit-Girl from Kick-Ass (2010)
- Female superheroes in Sky High (2005)
- Silk Spectre from Watchmen (2009)
- Tank Girl from Tank Girl (1995)

DC

- Amazons from Wonder Woman and the DC Extended Universe
- Antiope from Wonder Woman and the DC Extended Universe
- Atlanna from Aquaman (2018) and the DC Extended Universe
- Batgirl from Batman and Robin (1997)
- Catwoman from Batman Returns (1992), Catwoman (2004), The Dark Knight Rises (2012) and The Batman (2022)
- Faora from Man of Steel
- Queen Hippolyta from Wonder Woman and the DC Extended Universe
- Mera from Aquaman (2018) and the DC Extended Universe
- Kara Zor-El from Supergirl (1984)
- Wonder Woman from Wonder Woman and the DC Extended Universe

Marvel

- Angel Dust from Deadpool (2016)
- Angel Salvadore from X-Men: First Class (2011)
- Antonia Dreykov (Taskmaster) from Marvel Cinematic Universe
- Ava Starr (Ghost) from Marvel Cinematic Universe
- Cassandra Nova from Deadpool & Wolverine (2024)
- Carol Danvers (Captain Marvel) from Marvel Cinematic Universe
- Elektra Natchios from Daredevil (2003), Elektra (2005), and Deadpool & Wolverine (2024)
- Emma Frost from X-Men: First Class (2011)
- Gamora from Marvel Cinematic Universe
- GoGo Tomago from Big Hero 6 (2014)
- Hela from Thor: Ragnarok (2017)
- Honey Lemon from Big Hero 6 (2014)
- Hope van Dyne (Wasp) from Marvel Cinematic Universe
- Jane Foster (Mighty Thor) from Marvel Cinematic Universe
- Jean Grey (Phoenix) from the X-Men films
- Jubilation Lee (Jubilee) from the X-Men films
- Kamala Khan (Ms. Marvel) from Marvel Cinematic Universe
- Kitty Pryde from the X-Men films
- Lady Deathstrike from X2 (2003)
- Laura Barton from Marvel Cinematic Universe
- Mantis from Marvel Cinematic Universe
- Maria Hill from Marvel Cinematic Universe
- Monica Rambeau from Marvel Cinematic Universe
- Mystique/Raven from the X-Men films
- Natasha Romanoff (Black Widow) from Marvel Cinematic Universe
- Nebula from Marvel Cinematic Universe
- Peggy Carter (Captain Carter) from Marvel Cinematic Universe
- Red Sonja from Red Sonja (1985)
- Rogue from the X-Men films
- Sharon Carter (Agent 13) from Marvel Cinematic Universe
- Sif from Marvel Cinematic Universe
- Storm from the X-Men films
- Sue Storm (Invisible Woman) from Fantastic Four films and Marvel Cinematic Universe
- Wanda Maximoff (Scarlet Witch) from Marvel Cinematic Universe
- Valkyrie from Marvel Cinematic Universe
- Viper from The Wolverine (2013)
- Shuri, Okoye, and Nakia from Marvel Cinematic Universe
- Yelena Belova (Black Widow) from Marvel Cinematic Universe
- Wasp from Ultimate Avengers and Marvel Animated Features

==== Films based on novels ====
- Beatrice "Tris" Prior from The Divergent Series
- Éowyn from The Lord of the Rings series (2001–2003)
- Katniss Everdeen from The Hunger Games (2012–2015)
- Florence Zimmerman from The House with a Clock in Its Walls (2018)
- Hermione Granger from Harry Potter series (2001–2011)
- Ginny Weasley from Harry Potter series (2001–2011)
- Luna Lovegood from Harry Potter series (2001–2011)
- Hester Shaw from Mortal Engines (2018)
- Nurse Ratched from One Flew Over the Cuckoo's Nest (1975)

==== Films based on video games ====
- Alice from the Resident Evil series (2002–2016)
- Cammy from Street Fighter (1994)
- Chun-Li from Street Fighter and Street Fighter: The Legend of Chun-Li (2009)
- Claire Redfield from the Resident Evil series (2012)
- Jill Valentine from the Resident Evil series (2004–2012)
- Kitana and Sonya Blade from Mortal Kombat (1995) and Mortal Kombat Annihilation (1997)
- Lara Croft from Lara Croft: Tomb Raider (2001), Lara Croft: Tomb Raider – The Cradle of Life (2003) and Tomb Raider (2018)
- Princess Peach, Rosalina, Birdo and Princess Daisy from The Super Mario Bros. Movie and The Super Mario Galaxy Movie
- Rose Da Silva from Silent Hill (2006)
- Aki Ross and Jane Proudfoot from Final Fantasy: The Spirits Within
- Tifa Lockhart from Final Fantasy VII: Advent Children
- Tamina from Prince of Persia: The Sands of Time
- All women in Resident Evil: Welcome to Raccoon City

== Literature ==
- Alanna of Trebond from The Song of the Lioness series (1983–1988) by Tamora Pierce
- Alyx from The Adventures of Alyx stories by Joanna Russ (1967–1970)
- Annabeth Chase of the Percy Jackson & the Olympians series
- Arya Stark from the A Song of Ice and Fire series (1996–2011) by George R.R. Martin
- Beatrice "Tris" Prior from the Divergent trilogy (2011–2013) by Veronica Roth
- Camilla from the Aeneid (29–19 BCE) by Virgil
- Cassie Sullivan from The 5th Wave novel series and film based on the series
- Catti-brie from the Forgotten Realms novels by R. A. Salvatore
- Daenerys Targaryen from the A Song of Ice and Fire series (1996–2011) by George R.R. Martin
- Emma Castairs and Cristina Rosales from The Dark Artifices series (2016–2018) by Cassandra Clare
- Éowyn from The Lord of the Rings series (1954–1955) by J. R. R. Tolkien
- Gum Girl, Ninja-Rina, and Brainstormer from The Gumazing Gum Girl! series (2013–present) by Rhode Montijo
- Hermione Granger and Ginny Weasley from the Harry Potter series (1997–2007) by J.K. Rowling
- Jael from The Female Man by Joanna Russ (1970)
- Katniss Everdeen and Johanna Mason from The Hunger Games trilogy (2008–2010) by Suzanne Collins
- Modesty Blaise from Peter O'Donnell's comic strip (1963–2001) and book series (1965–1996)
- Linh Cinder from The Lunar Chronicles series (2012–2015) by Marissa Meyer
- Mara Jade from Star Wars Legends (1991–2012)
- Molly Millions from Johnny Mnemonic (1981) and Neuromancer (1984) by William Gibson
- Nancy Drew from the Nancy Drew Mystery Stories (1930–2004), The Nancy Drew Files (1986–1997) and the Girl Detective (2004–2012) series by Carolyn Keene
- Pippi Longstocking from the Pippi Longstocking series (1945–2001) by Astrid Lindgren
- Polgara from The Belgariad (1982–1984) and The Malloreon (1987–1991) series by David and Leigh Eddings
- Suzy Shooter from the Nightside series (2003–2012) by Simon R. Green
- Vin Venture from the Mistborn series (2006–present) by Brandon Sanderson
- Visenya Targaryen from the A Song of Ice and Fire series (1996–2011) by George R.R. Martin
- Isabelle Lightwood and Clary Fray from The Mortal Instruments series (2007–2014) by Cassandra Clare
- Tessa Gray, Cecily Herondale and Charlotte Branwell from The Infernal Devices by Cassandra Clare
- Holly Short and Juliet Butler of the Artemis Fowl series (2001–2012) by Eoin Colfer

=== Literary villains ===
- Grendel's mother from the anonymous Old English poem Beowulf
- The Others from The 5th Wave and film based on the novel: Nickname given by Cassie Sullivan. Extraterrestrial series that devastate humanity and mankind by unleashing a series of waves to kill them. They are sometimes known Silencers.

== Television ==
- Ace from Doctor Who (1963–1989)
- Agatha Harkness from WandaVision (2021) and Agatha All Along (2024)
- Aeryn Sun from Farscape (1999–2003)
- Aisha Campbell from Mighty Morphin Power Rangers
- Alex Danvers from Supergirl (2015–2021)
- Alex Mack from The Secret World of Alex Mack (1994–1998)
- Alice from Once Upon a Time in Wonderland
- Amaya Jiwe / Vixen from Legends of Tomorrow
- Amelia Jones and Izzy Garcia in Power Rangers Dino Fury
- Andrea Thomas from The Secrets of Isis
- Angelique Bouchard from Dark Shadows (1966–1971)
- Angie Diaz as Vida "V" Rocca, Udonna and Madison "Maddie" Rocca from Power Rangers Mystic Force
- Annie January / Starlight from The Boys (2019–2026)
- Arya Stark from Game of Thrones (2011–2019)
- Ashley Hammond and Cassie Chan from Power Rangers Turbo and Power Rangers in Space
- B'Elanna Torres from Star Trek: Voyager (1995–2001)
- Batgirl from Batman (1966–1968)
- Bo-Katan Kryze from The Mandalorian
- Bonnie from Echo
- Brienne of Tarth from Game of Thrones (2011–2019)
- Brooke Davis from One Tree Hill (2003–2012)
- Buffy Summers from Buffy the Vampire Slayer (1997–2003)
- Catilin Snow/Killer Frost/Frost from The Flash
- Cameron from Terminator: The Sarah Connor Chronicles (2008–2009)
- Caporal Jennifer "Pilot" Chase from Captain Power and the soldiers of the future
- Capt. Maggie Beckett from Sliders (1995–2000)
- Captain Elizabeth Bonny from Neverland
- Cara Dune from The Mandalorian
- Cathy Gale from The Avengers (1961–1969)
- Christine Cagney from Cagney & Lacey (1982–1988)
- Christy Love from Get Christy Love! (1974–1975)
- Claire Bennet from Heroes (2006–2010)
- Clarke Griffin from The 100 (2014–2020)
- Cordelia Chase from Angel (1999–2004)
- Daenerys Targaryen from Game of Thrones (2011–2019)
- Daisy Johnson / Quake from Agents of S.H.I.E.L.D. (2013–2020)
- Dana Scully from The X-Files (1993–2002)
- Deirdre from Mystic Knights of Tir Na Nog
- Delphine from Mighty Morphin Alien Rangers
- Dinah Drake / Black Canary from Arrow
- Doña María Teresa "Tessa" Alvarado from Queen of Swords (2000–2001)
- Donna Noble from Doctor Who
- Dorothy Gale from Once Upon a Time
- Echo from Hawkeye and Echo
- Elektra Natchios from Daredevil (2015–2018) and The Defenders (2017)
- Electra Woman and Dyna Girl
- Elizabeth "Z" Delgado and Sydney "Syd" Drew from Power Rangers S.P.D.
- Emily Stewart, Lauren Shiba and Mia Watanabe from Power Rangers Samurai and Power Rangers Super Samurai
- Emma Goodall and Gia Moran from Power Rangers Megaforce and Power Rangers Super Megaforce
- Emma Peel from The Avengers (1961–1969)
- Emma Swan from Once Upon a Time
- Erin Lindsay from Chicago P.D. (2014–2017)
- Fennec Shand from The Mandalorian and The Book of Boba Fett
- Fern from Power Rangers Cosmic Fury
- Fiona Gallagher from Shameless (2011–present)
- Gabby Dawson Casey from Chicago Fire (2012–present)
- Gabrielle from Xena: Warrior Princess (1995–2001) and Hercules: The Legendary Journeys (1995–1999)
- Gwen Cooper from Torchwood (2006–2011)
- Gauri/Devi/Durga from Maharakshak: Devi (2015)
- Hayley Foster and Sarah Thompson from Power Rangers Ninja Steel and Power Rangers Super Ninja Steel
- Haley James-Scott from One Tree Hill (2003–2012)
- Helena Kyle, Barbara Gordon and Dinah Redmond from Birds of Prey
- Honey West from Honey West
- Iris West-Allen from The Flash
- Jacqueline from Once Upon a Time
- Jane Hopper / Eleven from Stranger Things (2016–2026)
- Jennifer Walters (She-Hulk) from She-Hulk: Attorney at Law (2022)
- Joyce Byers from Stranger Things
- Jadzia Dax from Star Trek: Deep Space Nine (1993–1999)
- Jaime Sommers from The Bionic Woman (1976–1978) and Bionic Woman (2007)
- Jane Doe from Blindspot (2015–2020)
- Jemma Simmons, Barbara "Bobbi" Morse and Elena "Yo-Yo" Rodriguez from Agents of S.H.I.E.L.D. and Agents of S.H.I.E.L.D.: Slingshot
- Jesse Quick from The Flash
- Jessica Jones from Jessica Jones (2015–2019) and The Defenders (2018)
- Jill Munroe from Charlie's Angels (1976–1981)
- Julia Martinez (Manila) from Money Heist
- Julie Barnes in The Mod Squad
- Julie Rogers from Charlie's Angels (1976–1981)
- Kamala Khan, Nakia Bahadir and Aisha in Ms. Marvel
- Kara Danvers (Supergirl) from Supergirl (2015–2021)
- Karli Morgenthau from The Falcon and the Winter Soldier
- Kat Hillard from Mighty Morphin Power Rangers, Power Rangers Zeo, and Power Rangers Turbo
- Katana from Arrow
- Kate Austen from Lost (2004–2010)
- Kate Kane (Batwoman) from Batwoman (2019–2022)
- Kathryn Janeway from Star Trek: Voyager (1995–2001)
- Katie Walker and Jennifer "Jen" Scotts from Power Rangers Time Force
- Kelly Garrett from Charlie's Angels (1976–1981)
- Kelly Olsen from Supergirl (2015–2021)
- Kelsey Winslow and Dana Mitchell from Power Rangers Lightspeed Rescue
- Kendra Saunders / Hawkgirl from Arrowverse (2012–present)
- Kimberly Hart from Mighty Morphin Power Rangers (1993–1995)
- Kira Ford from Power Rangers Dino Thunder
- Kira Nerys from Star Trek: Deep Space Nine (1993–1999)
- Kris Munroe from Charlie's Angels (1976–1981)
- Laurel Lance (Black Siren/Black Canary) from Arrowverse (2012–present)
- Lagertha from Vikings (2013–2020)
- Leela from Doctor Who (1963–1989)
- Lily Chilman and Master Guin from Power Rangers Jungle Fury
- Lily Page from Once Upon a Time
- Maggie Beckett from Sliders
- Maggie Greene, Carol Peletier, Rosita Espinosa, Magna, Yumiko and Connie from The Walking Dead
- Maid Marian from Once Upon a Time
- Mary Beth Lacey from Cagney & Lacey (1982–1988)
- Max Guevera from Dark Angel (2000–2002)
- Martha Jones from Doctor Who
- Maya, Kendrix and Karone from Power Rangers Lost Galaxy
- Medusa and Crystal from Inhumans
- Melinda May from Agents of S.H.I.E.L.D. (2013–2020)
- Mia Smoak from Arrow
- Michonne from The Walking Dead
- Milah from Once Upon a Time
- Mónica Gaztambide (Stockholm) from Money Heist
- Mulan from Once Upon a Time
- Nikita from La Femme Nikita (1997–2001)
- Nairobi from Money Heist
- Nora West-Allen/XS from The Flash
- Nyota Uhura from Star Trek (1966–present)
- Nancy Wheeler from Stranger Things
- Nia Nal (Dreamer) from Supergirl
- Nyssa al Ghul from Arrow
- Olivia Benson from Law & Order: Special Victims Unit (1999–present)
- Olivia Dunham from Fringe (2008–2013)
- Paige Matthews from Charmed (2001–2006)
- Peyton Sawyer from One Tree Hill (2003–2012)
- Phoebe Halliwell from Charmed (1998–2006)
- Phoebe, Barb, Nora, and Chloe Thunderman from Nickelodeon's The Thundermans franchise
- Phryne Fisher from Miss Fisher's Murder Mysteries (2012–2015)
- Piper Halliwell from Charmed (1998–2006)
- Prue Halliwell from Charmed (1998–2001)
- Purdey from The New Avengers (1976–1977)
- Raquel Murillo from Money Heist
- Red Riding Hood from Once Upon a Time
- River Song from Doctor Who (2005–2023)
- River Tam from Firefly (2002)
- Rose Tyler from Doctor Who
- Sabrina Duncan from Charlie's Angels (1976–1981)
- Saki Asamiya, Yoko Godai, Kyoko "Okyo" Nakamura, Yukino Yajima, Yui Kazama, Yuka and Yuma from Sukeban Deka
- Samantha Carter from the Stargate franchise
- Sara Lance/The Canary/White Canary from Arrow and Legends of Tomorrow
- Sarah MacKenzie from JAG
- Sarah Jane Smith from Doctor Who and The Sarah Jane Adventures
- Seska from Star Trek: Voyager
- Seven of Nine from Star Trek: Voyager (1995–2001)
- "Sheena: Queen of the Jungle" starring Irish McCalla in 1955
- Shelby Watkins and Kendall Morgan from Power Rangers Dino Charge and Power Rangers Dino Super Charge
- Starfire and Raven from Titans
- Summer Landsdown and Gemma from Power Rangers RPM
- Shelby Woo from The Mystery Files of Shelby Woo (1996–1998)
- Snow White from Once Upon a Time
- Sylvie Brett from Chicago Fire (2012–present)
- Starbuck from Battlestar Galactica (2004–2009)
- Sydney Bristow from Alias (2001–2006)
- Tanya Sloan from Power Rangers Zeo and Power Rangers Turbo
- Tara King from The Avengers (1961–1969)
- Tasha Yar from Star Trek: The Next Generation
- Taylor Earhardt and Alyssa Enrilé from Power Rangers Wild Force
- The Doctor (thirteenth incarnation) from Doctor Who (2005–present)
- Thea Queen (Speedy) from Arrow
- Tiana from Once Upon a Time
- Tiffany Welles from Charlie's Angels (1976–1981)
- Tokyo from Money Heist
- Tori Hanson from Power Rangers Ninja Storm
- Trini Kwan from Mighty Morphin Power Rangers (1993–1995)
- Trish Walker and Jeri Hogarth from Jessica Jones
- Vallery Irons from V.I.P. (1998–2002)
- Veronica Layton from The Lost World (1999–2002)
- Veronica Mars from Veronica Mars (2004–2007)
- Veronica "Ronny" Robinson and Rose Ortiz from Power Rangers Operation Overdrive
- Wade Welles from Sliders (1995–2000)
- Wonder Woman from Wonder Woman (1975–1979)
- Xena from Xena: Warrior Princess (1995–2001) and Hercules: The Legendary Journeys (1995–1999)
- Ygritte from Game of Thrones (2011–2017)
- Zari Tomaz from Legends of Tomorrow
- Zoe Ramirez from Legends of Tomorrow
- Zoe Washburne from Firefly (2002)
- Zoey Reeves from Power Rangers Beast Morphers
- Peggy Matsuyama from Himitsu Sentai Gorenger
- Ilsa Pucci and Ames from Human Target
- Mary "Zed" Martin from Constantine
- Sarah Essen, Barbara Kean and Renee Montoya from Gotham
- Emily Locke from Powerless
- Lyta-Zod from Krypton
- Thunder and Lightning from Black Lightning
- Abigail "Abby" Arcane from Swamp Thing
- Angela Abar, Laurie Blake and Lady Trieu from Watchmen
- Crazy Jane, Elasti-Woman, and Madame Rouge from Doom Patrol
- Marie Moreau, Mini Cricket, Cate Dunlap and Indira Shetty from Gen V
- The women from Sweet Tooth
- Lucienne from The Sandman
- Crystal Palace, Jenny the Butcher, Night Nurse, Esther and Niko from Dead Boy Detectives
- Naomi McDuffie from Naomi
- Leota Adebayo and Emilia Harcourt from Peacemaker
- Duela Dent, Robin, Harper Row, and Stephanie Brown from Gotham Knights
- Sofia Falcone in The Penguin
- Tina McGee in The Flash
- G'iah, Maria Hill and Sonya Falsworth in Secret Invasion
- Layla El-Faouly from Moon Knight
- The women from Runaways
- The women from Legion
- Tandy Bowen from Cloak & Dagger
- Colleen Wing, Joy Meachum and Mary Walker from Iron Fist
- Ravonna Renslayer, Verity Willis and Miss Minutes from Loki
- Mercedes "Misty" Knight, Mariah Dillard and Tilda Johnson from Luke Cage
- Karen Page and Sarah Lieberman from The Punisher
- Women from What If...?
- Kimiko Miyashiro from The Boys

=== Animated television series ===
See also: female action heroes and villains in the section for anime.

- Æon Flux from Æon Flux (1991–1995)
- Agent L from Men in Black: The Series
- Alex from Totally Spies! (2001–2014)
- Alice from Superjail
- Betty Barrett (Atomic Betty) from Atomic Betty (2004–2008)
- Ashi from Samurai Jack (2017)
- Amalia and Evangelyne from Wakfu
- Blossom, Bubbles and Buttercup from The Powerpuff Girls (1998–2005)
- The Guardians from W.I.T.C.H.
- Clover Andersson from Totally Spies! (2001–2014)
- Cybersix from Cybersix (1999)
- Fleur d'épine from Cartouche
- Jenny Wakeman/XJ9 from My Life as a Teenage Robot (2002–2006)
- Mami Sakura from Esper Mami (1987–1989)
- Cheetara from ThunderCats (1985–1989)
- Jane from Jane and the Dragon
- Jessica Morgan from The Transformers (1984–1987)
- Powder / Jinx from Arcane (2021–2024)
- Azula from Avatar: The Last Airbender (2005–2008)
- Katara from Avatar: The Last Airbender (2005–2008)
- Toph Beifong from Avatar: The Last Airbender (2005–2008)
- Kim Possible from Kim Possible (2002–2007)
- Korra from The Legend of Korra (2012–2014)
- Kuvira from The Legend of Korra (2012–2014)
- Leela from Futurama (1999–2003, 2008–2013)
- Marissa Faireborn from The Transformers (1984–1987)
- Millie from Helluva Boss
- Mizu from Blue Eye Samurai
- Sam from Totally Spies! (2001–2014)
- Sari Sumdac from Transformers: Animated (2007–2009)
- She-Ra from She-Ra: Princess of Power (1985–1987)
- Sophia Paramount from Bob Morane
- The Gems from Steven Universe
- The princesses from LoliRock
- Yumi and Aelita from Code Lyoko
- Ladybug, Alya, Chloé Bourgeois from Miraculous: Tales of Ladybug & Cat Noir
- Calamity Jane from The Legend of Calamity Jane
- April O'Neil from Teenage Mutant Ninja Turtles
- Jennifer Julian and Rebecca Wong from Chris Colorado
- The women from Alienators: Evolution Continues
- Penny from Inspector Gadget and Gadget & the Gadgetinis
- Luea from Kong: The Animated Series
- The twins sisters from Mary-Kate and Ashley in Action!
- Calamity Jane from Lucky Luke
- Cyana Baarha from Malo Korrigan
- Stacey Bonner and Seattle Montoya from Stargate Infinity
- Giga-Woman from Captain Biceps
- Megan from SpieZ! Nouvelle Génération / The Amazing Spiez!
- Dale Arden and Thundar from Flash Gordon
- Miss Lestrade from Sherlock Holmes in the 22nd Century
- Sixe from Tripping the Rift
- Marianne Flambelle from Marianne 1ère
- Mia and her female friends from Mia and Me
- Niko from Adventures of the Galaxy Rangers
- Juge J.B. McBride from Bravestarr
- Kylie from Extreme Ghostbusters
- Steelheart from SilverHawks
- Jedda from Defenders of the Earth
- Futura from Ghostbusters
- Helen Bennett and Meg Bennett from Bionic Six
- Katerina Anastasia from Spiral Zone
- Galadria from Visionaries: Knights of the Magical Light
- Policewomen from COPS
- Policewomen from Police Academy
- Patty Putty and Terri Cloth from Garbage Pail Kids
- Princess Lana from Captain N
- Women commandoes from GI JOE
- Lydia from Beetlejuice
- 2 female characters from Captain Planet and the Planeteers
- 2 female characters from James Bond Jr
- Hannah Dundee from Cadillacs and Dinosaurs
- Elisa Maza, Angela and Demona from Gargoyles
- Eva Kant from Diabolik
- Nancy from RoboCop: Alpha Commando
- Lewis from Robocop: The Animated Series
- Jade Chan from Jackie Chan Adventures
- Princess Bubblegum and Marceline the Vampire Queen from Adventure Time
- Raf, Uri and Miki from Angel's Friends
- Zhalia Moon and Sophie Casterwill from Huntik: Secrets & Seekers
- Arkayna Goodfey, Emerald Goldenbraid, Zarya Moonwolf and Piper Willowbrook from Mysticons
- Twinkle Starglitter and Ruby from Super 4
- The ghouls from the longs films of Monster High
- The girls from Lego Friends
- Emily Jones and female elves from Lego Elves
- Princess Sélénia from Arthur and the Invisibles
- Alexis from Transformers Armada
- Lori Jiménez from Transformers: Cybertron
- Misha Miramond from Transformers: Energon
- Miko Nakadai from Transformers: Prime
- Dani Burns and Francine "Frankie" Elma Greene from Transformers: Rescue Bots
- Kylie Griffin from Extreme Ghostbusters
- Janine Melnitz and Catherine (one of the Junior Ghostbusters) from The Real Ghostbusters
- Jedda Walker from Defenders of the Earth
- April O'Neil from Teenage Mutant Ninja Turtles (2003), Teenage Mutant Ninja Turtles (2012), Rise of the Teenage Mutant Ninja Turtles
- Sagan Cruz from Phantom 2040
- Princess Unikitty, Dr. Fox, Master Doom and Flamurtle from Unikitty!
- Nova and Jinmay from Super Robot Monkey Team Hyperforce Go!
- Princess Twilight Sparkle, Rarity, Rainbow Dash, Fluttershy, Applejack, and Pinkie Pie from My Little Pony: Friendship is Magic
- Violet "Vi" from Arcane (2021–2024)
- Webby Vanderquck, Della Duck, Mrs. Beakley, Penumbra, Daisy Duck and Gosalyn Waddlemeyer from DuckTales
- Star Butterfly, Moon Butterfly, Eclipsa Butterfly, Meteora Butterfly, most previous Butterfly family members, Mina Loveberry, Hekapoo, Janna Ordonia and Pony Head from Star vs. the Forces of Evil
- Anne Boonchuy, Polly Plantar, Sasha Waybright, Marcy Wu, Ivy Sundew, General Yunan and Lady Olivia from Amphibia
- Luz Noceda, Amity Blight, Eda Clawthorne, Lilith Clawthorne, Willow Park, Camila Noceda, Kikimora from The Owl House
- Numbuh 3/Kuki Sanbun and Numbuh 5/Abigail Lincoln from Codename: Kids Next Door
- Felicity from Rainbow Butterfly Unicorn Kitty
- Miko Kubota from Glitch Techs
- Kipo Oak and Wolf from Kipo and the Age of Wonderbeasts
- Mabel Pines and Wendy Courdroy from Gravity Falls
- Reggie Abbott and Esther from Twelve Forever
- Sylvia and Lord Dominator from Wander Over Yonder
- Adorabat from Mao Mao: Heroes of Pure Heart
- Tara Duncan and the female friends from Tara Duncan
- Millie and Loona from Helluva Boss
- BG/Gudule from Miss BG
- Yadina Riddle from Xavier Riddle and the Secret Museum
- Brendar from The Barbarian and the Troll
- Ivy from Where on Earth Is Carmen Sandiego?
- Carmen Sandiego from Carmen Sandiego
- Women from Marvel Animation and Marvel Studios Animation
- Vera and Daphne from Scooby-Doo
- 3 ladies from Captain Caveman and the Teen Angels
- Women in Hazbin Hotel
- Warden Fisher from Captain Laserhawk: A Blood Dragon Remix
- Uzi Doorman, V and Cyn from Murder Drones

=== Anime ===
- Antoinette "Tony" Dubois from Reporter Blues
- Princess Sapphire from Princess Knight by Osamu Tetsuka
- Princess Hime, Liliane, Lisa Wildman and Reiri Kamura from Princess Resurrection
- Simone from La Seine no Hoshi
- Angie Islington from Angie Girl
- Lady Armaroid from Cobra
- Marina from Galaxy Express 999
- Lalabel from Lalabel
- Megu-chan from Majokko Megu-chan (Little Meg the Witch Girl)
- Ymir Fritz and her daughters Maria, Rose, and Sina from Attack on Titan
- Chisato Nishikigi and Takina Inoue from Lycoris Recoil
- Clare and other silver hair Claymorer/Witch from Claymore
- Hoshimi from Maps
- Maka Albarn from Soul Eater
- Mako Sato and Sayuki from Initial D
- Mikura Suzuki from Mezzo Forte and Mezzo DSA
- Noa Izumi from Patlabor
- Rushuna from Grenadier
- Sawa from Kite
- Thief girl from Cat's Eye
- Karri, Miki and Seiko from City Hunter
- Tiko and Tickle from Majokko Tickle
- Patty Lowell from Devil May Cry: The Animated Series
- Asuna Yuuki from Sword Art Online
- Mikasa Ackerman from Attack on Titan
- Erza Scarlet, Lucy Heartfilia and Wendy from Fairy Tail
- Homura Akemi from Puella Magi Madoka Magica
- Nevenaa and Ariane Goliatkine (power to become big age) from Anatane: Saving the Children of Okura
- Android 18 and Videl from Dragon Ball Z
- Pan from Dragon Ball GT
- Ran Tsukikage from Kazemakase Tsukikage Ran
- Yoruichi Shihouin from Bleach
- Hikaru Minamoto from Otogi Zoshi
- Oscar François de Jarjayes from The Rose of Versailles
- Satsuki Kiryuuin From Kill la Kill
- Lina Inverse, Ameila, Sylphiel, and Naga from Slayers
- Sara and Fuu from Samurai Champloo
- Utena Tenjou from Shōjo Kakumei Utena
- Shana From Shakugan no Shana
- Shiki Ryougi From Kara no Kyoukai
- Kagome Higurashi and Sango from InuYasha
- Princess Lum from Urusei Yatsura
- Lunlun from Hana no Ko Lunlun
- Youko Nakajima From The Twelve Kingdoms
- Emu Hino from Crying Freeman
- Eira from Ellcia
- Makie Otono-Tachibana from Blade of the Immortal
- Morgiana From Magi: The Labyrinth of Magic
- Balsa Yonsa From Seirei no Moribito
- Fujiko Mine from Lupin the Third
- Mamiya from Hokuto No Ken
- Miyu from Vampire Princess Miyu
- Saya Otonashi from Blood+
- Saya Kisaragi from Blood-C
- Irene "Rally" Vincent and "Minnie" May Hopkins from Gunsmith Cats
- Rei Ayanami and Asuka Langley Soryu from Neon Genesis Evangelion
- Deedlit from Record of Lodoss War
- Amaha Masane, Korean ethnic bearers of the blade from Witchblade
- Faye Valentine from Cowboy Bebop
- Sakura from Card Captor Sakura and Tsubasa Reservoir Chronicle
- Excel from Excel Saga
- Naru Narusegawa, Motoko Aoyama and Kaolla Sû from Love Hina
- Victoria Séras and Integra Fairbrook Wingates Hellsing from Hellsing
- Mahoro Andô from Mahoromatic
- Françoise / 003 from Cyborg 009
- Robin Sena from Witch Hunter Robin
- The Mew Mew from Mew Mew Power
- Sakura Haruno, Hinata Hyuga, and Ino Yamanaka from Naruto
- The female child from Gunslinger Girl
- Maya Natsume and Aya Natsume from Tenjô Tenge
- The warriors from Tales of Phantasia: The Animations
- Maam and Leona from Dragon Quest: The Adventure of Dai
- Ai Enma from Hell Girl
- Illyasviel von Einzbern and Rider from Fate/stay night
- Kyohei Tachibana and Sei from Burst Angel
- Laureline from Valérian and Laureline
- Michiru Kita from Zombie Loan
- Yûmi from Pastel Yumi, the Magic Idol
- Hikaru Shidou, Umi Ryuzaki, and Fuu Hououji from Magic Knight Rayearth
- Mireille Bouquet and Kirika Yuumura from Noir
- Momo from Magical Princess Minky Momo
- Motoko Kusanagi from Ghost in the Shell: Stand Alone Complex (2002–2005) and Ghost in the Shell: Arise – Alternative Architecture (2015)
- Naomi Armitage from Armitage III
- Pollon from Little Pollon
- Ranma (female form) and the other girls from Ranma ½
- Sally from Sally the Witch
- Athena and Saintia from Saint Seiya and Saintia Shō
- Sailor Moon and other Sailor Scouts from the Sailor Moon franchise.
- Princess Flora from Honey Honey no Suteki na Bouken
- Françoise / Fantômette from Fantômette
- Honey Kisaragi from Cutie Honey
- Myung Fang Lone from Macross Plus
- Natsuru Senō (female form), Akane Mishima, Shizuku Sangō, Mikoto Kondō and Kaede Sakura from Kämpfer
- The little girls from Ojamajo Doremi
- Yufa from Ragnarok the Animation
- Warrior women (half-human, half-demon) from Claymore
- The school girls from Magical Girl Site
- Celty Sturluson from Durarara!!
- Revy, Balalaïka, Eda, Roberta et Fabiola Iglesias from Black Lagoon
- Meia, Barnette, Jura, "BC", and Dita from Vandread
- Rose Cinderella from Regal Academy
- Renka from Ironfist Chinmi
- Arusu, Sheila and Eva from Tweeny Witches
- Lucy Heartfilia, Erza Scarlet, Wendy Marvel, Carla, Mirajane Strauss and Juvia Loxar from Fairy Tail
- Tuka Luna Marceau, Lelei la Lalena, Rory Mercury, Yao Haa Dushi, Mari Kurokawa, Shino Kuribayashi and other female warriors from Gate
- Ryuko Matoi and Satsuki Kiryuin from Kill La Kill
- The women from Sound of the Sky
- Izetta from Izetta: The Last Witch
- The girls from High School Fleet
- Rei Miyamoto and Saeko Busujima from Highschool of the Dead
- Tanya from Saga of Tanya the Evil
- The 2 girls of Girls' Last Tour
- The women of Kantai Collection
- The tank drivers in Girls und Panzer
- The zombie girls in Calamity of a Zombie Girl
- Iu Shindo in I'm Standing on a Million Lives
- Noel and Ninny in Burn the Witch
- Elaina in Wandering Witch: The Journey of Elaina
- The witches from Little Witch Academia
- The girl from Witch Craft Works
- The girls from Zero no Tsukaima
- The girls from Strike Witches
- The bloody woman from Umineko When They Cry
- The girls in Sugar Sugar Rune
- The girls in Soul Eater Not!
- The girls in Strike Witches 2
- The witch girl in Rental Magica
- The girls in Assassination Classroom
- The girls in Majokko Megu-chan
- The girls in Angelic Layer
- The woman with an umbrella in Beelzebub
- The archers in Utawarerumono
- The girl in Nijū Mensō no Musume
- The android woman (gynoid) and other women in Space Cobra
- The women in Code Geass
- The women in Coyote Ragtime Show
- The female elves in Legend of Crystania
- The girl in DNA²
- The girls in E's Otherwise
- The girls in El Cazador de la Bruja
- The girls in El-Hazard
- The girls in Elemental Gerad
- The women in Final Fantasy: Unlimited
- The girls in Gate Keepers
- The women in GetBackers
- The girl in Sakura Wars TV
- The girl in Guilty Crown
- The girls in Samurai High School
- Lin in Hokuto no Ken
- The girls in Ikkitousen
- The girls in Interlude
- The girl in Kiba
- The girls in Labyrinth of Flames
- The girls in Aquarian Age: Sign for Evolution
- The women samurais in Shura no Toki
- The 3 girls in Magic Knight Rayearth
- Madoka Ayukawa in Kimagure Orange Road
- The girls in Sound of the Sky
- The girl in Mezzo DSA
- The girls in Mirai Nikki
- The girls in Moeyo Ken
- The girl in Murder Princess
- The women from Fushigi no Umi no Nadia
- The women from Mahō Sensei Negima!
- The women from Overman King Gainer
- The women from Pandora Hearts
- The gynoid from Parasite Dolls
- The girls in Rave Master
- The woman in Samurai Gun
- The lady in Shadow Skill
- The girl in Shangri-La
- The girls in Shining Tears X Wind
- The girls in Soul Eater
- The witch girl in The Good Witch of the West
- The girl in The Garden of Sinners
- The girls in Tiger & Bunny
- The girls in Tokyo Majin Gakuen
- Sakura in Tsubasa Chronicle and Cardcaptor Sakura
- The vampire girls in Shingetsutan Tsukihime
- The 2 girls in Shōjo Kakumei Utena
- The girl in Vampire Knight
- Aoi Yume in Wing-Man
- The women in X
- The lady in ×××HOLiC
- The girl in Otome Yōkai Zakuro
- The ladies in Queen's Blade
- Aoi Yume in Wing-Man
- The girls from Tsukihime
- The girls from Oh My Goddess!
- The girls from Vivid Strike
- The girl from Angie Girl
- Lillabit from The Littl' Bits
- The women from Captain Harlock
- Charmy and Mereoleona Vermillion from Black Clover
- Nami, Princess Vivi and Nico Robin from One Piece
- Milim Nava from That Time I Got Reincarnated as a Slime
- The women from Michiko & Hatchin
- The women from My Hero Academia
- Shinobu Kocho, Nezuko Kamado from Demon Slayer
- Sasha Braus, Mikasa Ackerman from Attack on Titan
- Orihime Inoue from Bleach
- Pitou, Pakunoda from Hunter x Hunter
- Konan and Hinata Hyuga from Naruto
- Arianne in Skeleton Knight in Another World
- The girls from Glitter Force
- The girls from DokiDoki! PreCure
- The women from Black Lagoon

=== Commercials ===
- Nameless runner (Anya Major) in Ridley Scott's 1984

== Video games ==
- Ada Wong, Claire Redfield, Jill Valentine, Rebecca Chambers, Sheva Alomar, Sherry Birkin (only RE6), Helena Harper, and Mia Winters, from Resident Evil series
- Aegis and the heroine from Persona 3
- Alisa Bosconovitch, Anna Williams, Asuka Kazama, Christie Monteiro, Lucky Chloe, Jun Kazama, Michelle Chang, Nina Williams, Julia Chang and Ling Xiaoyu from Tekken series
- Alma Wade from F.E.A.R.
- Aloy from Horizon Zero Dawn
- Alyx Vance from Half-Life 2 and its sequels
- Amaterasu from Ōkami
- Amélie Lacroix (Widowmaker), Brigitte Lindholm, Moira O'Deorain and Mercy from Overwatch; Aleksandra Zaryanova (Zarya), Ana Amari, Lena Oxton (Tracer), Hana Song (D.Va), and Mei-Ling Zhou from Overwatch and Heroes of the Storm
- Amy Rose, Blaze the Cat, Rouge the Bat, Cream the Rabbit, Wave the Swallow, Tangle the Lemur, and Whisper the Wolf from the Sonic the Hedgehog series
- Anna DeWitt from BioShock Infinite
- Annah-of-the-Shadows from Planescape: Torment
- April Ryan from The Longest Journey
- Athena Asamiya from Psycho Soldier and Athena: Awakening from the Ordinary Life
- Aveline de Grandpré from Assassin's Creed III: Liberation, Evie Frye from Assassin's Creed Syndicate, Jun from Assassin's Creed Chronicles and Elise from Assassin's Creed Unity
- Ayame from Tenchu series
- Bastila Shan from Star Wars: Knights of the Old Republic
- Bayonetta from Bayonetta
- Jess et Soph Blazkowicz from Wolfenstein: Youngblood
- Blaze Fielding from Streets of Rage
- Blue Mary and Mai Shiranui from Fatal Fury
- Brianna Kae from Star Wars Knights of the Old Republic II: The Sith Lords
- Brite Bomber, Renegade Raider, Cuddle Team Leader, Zoey, and various other characters from Fortnite: Battle Royale
- Cammy White, C. Viper, Chun-Li, Kolin, Laura Matsuda, Lucia Morgan, Menat, Makoto, Maki Genryusai, Ibuki, Rainbow Mika, Sakura Kasugano, and Rose from Final Fight & Street Fighter series
- Carmen Isabella Sandiego from Where in the World Is Carmen Sandiego?
- Cassie Cage, Jade, Mileena, Princess Kitana, Queen Sindel, Skarlet, Sonya Blade and Tanya from Mortal Kombat series
- Cate Archer from The Operative: No One Lives Forever
- Taina "Caveira" Pereira and Yumiko "Hibana" Imagawa from Rainbow Six Siege
- Chell and GLaDOS from Portal and Portal 2
- Cindy Aurum, Dagger, Edea Kramer, Faris Scherwiz, Lightning, Rikku, Rydia, Terra Branford, Yuffie Kisaragi and Yuna from Final Fantasy series
- Commander Shepard from Mass Effect series
- Cortana from Halo series
- Dark Queen from Battletoads
- Elara Dorne from Star Wars: The Old Republic
- Elena Fisher and Chloe Frazer from Uncharted
- Elexis Sinclaire from SiN
- Ellie from The Last of Us and The Last of Us: Left Behind
- Emily Kaldwin from Dishonored 2
- Etna from Disgaea
- Ellie from Monster Tale
- Eve from Stellar Blade
- Faith Connors from Mirror's Edge
- Filia Medici from Skullgirls
- Felicia, Morrigan Aensland, Hsien-Ko and Mei-Ling, Baby Bonnie Hood and Q-Bee from Darkstalkers series
- Hana Tsu-Vachel from Fear Effect
- Heather Mason and Claudia Wolf from Silent Hill 3 and Dahlia Gillespie from Silent Hill 1
- Jade from Beyond Good & Evil
- Jaina Proudmoore, Sylvanas Windrunner and Tyrande Whisperwind from Warcraft series and Heroes of the Storm
- Joanna Dark from Perfect Dark
- Kasumi, Christie, Helena Douglas, Hitomi, Tina Armstrong, Ayane from Dead or Alive
- The Raiden Shogun from Genshin Impact
- Kiana, Mei, Theresa, Bronya, Himeko, Fu Hua, Seele, Yae Sakura, Rita, and Durandal from Honkai Impact 3rd
- Koudelka from Koudelka
- Krystal, Katt Monroe, Fay, Miyu, Amanda, Lucy Hare, Fara Phoenix, and the Aparoid Queen from the Star Fox series.
- Lara Croft from the Tomb Raider series
- Lucia of Badham from The Wing of Madoola
- Lucca, Marle, and Ayla from Chrono Trigger
- Millia Rage, May, Ramlethal Valentine and I-No from Guilty Gear series
- Momiji and Rachel from Ninja Gaiden
- Mona Sax from Max Payne
- Nakoruru from Samurai Shodown
- Arle Nadja from Madō Monogatari and Puyo Puyo
- Nilin Cartier-Wells from Remember Me
- Nova Terra and Sarah Kerrigan from StarCraft series and Heroes of the Storm
- Pearl and Marina from Splatoon 2
- Persephone from God of War: Chains of Olympus
- Primrose Azelhart from Octopath Traveler
- Princess Daisy from Super Mario Bros. Wonder
- Princess Daphne from Dragon's Lair
- Princess Peach Toadstool from Super Princess Peach, Super Mario Bros. 2, Super Mario RPG, Mario + Rabbids Kingdom Battle, Mario + Rabbids Sparks of Hope, Princess Peach: Showtime!
- Princess Zelda, Navi, Fi, Midna, Epona, Mipha, and Urbosa from The Legend of Zelda series
- Rabbid Peach from Mario + Rabbids Kingdom Battle, Mario + Rabbids Sparks of Hope
- Rayne the Dhampir from BloodRayne
- Reiko Nagase from Rave Racer and Ridge Racer
- Regina from Dino Crisis
- Rosalina, Edge, Rabbid Rosalina, Midnite, Bedrock, Daphne, Kanya, and Allegra from Mario + Rabbids Sparks of Hope
- Rufu, Kairu, and Hamusu from Battle Zeque Den
- Ripple from Magical Chase GB: Minarai Mahoutsukai Kenja no Tani e
- Rynn from Drakan: Order of the Flame
- SHODAN from System Shock
- Saber and Rin Tohsaka from Fate/stay night
- Samus Aran, Gandrayda, and Mother Brain from the Metroid series
- Sarah Bryant, Aoi Umenokoji, Eileen, Pai Chan and Vanessa Lewis from Virtua Fighter
- Shantae from Shantae
- Shion Uzuki and KOS-MOS from Xenosaga
- Sophitia, Hildegard von Krone, Talim, Taki, Seong Mi-na, Setsuka, Tira, Xianghua and Ivy Valentine from the Soulcalibur series
- The Boss, EVA, Quiet, Meryl Silverburgh, and Sniper Wolf from Metal Gear series
- Trish, Lucia, and Lady from Devil May Cry series
- Twintelle from Arms
- Tyris Flare from Golden Axe
- Ulala from Space Channel 5
- Yuri Sakazaki from Art of Fighting
- Yuri Kozukata from Fatal Frame: Maiden of Black Water
- Zero from Drakengard 3
- Ajna from Indivisible
- Akira (female twin) from Astral Chain
- Aurora from Otaku no Seiza: An Adventure in the Otaku Galaxy
- Alana McKendricks from Fighting Force
- Alexandra Roivas from Eternal Darkness
- Alice Liddell from American McGee's Alice
- Alicia Claus from Bullet Witch
- Aline Cedrac from Alone in the Dark: The New Nightmare
- Alis Landale from Phantasy Star I
- Angelina Bradshaw from Dark Arena
- Anna from Dark Angel: Vampire Apocalypse
- Anna Grimsdottir from Splinter Cell
- Annet Myer from El Viento and Anett Futatabi
- Anya Stroud, Myrrah Samantha Byrne, Sofia Hendrik and Kait Diaz from Gears of War (2006–present)
- Ann from ANNO: Mutationem
- Aoi Yasaka from Demon Chaos
- Ariel from Aretha
- Asha from Monster World IV
- Aska from Teenage Mutant Ninja Turtles: Tournament Fighters (SNES version)
- Ayano Aishi-chan from Yandere Simulator
- Aurora from Child of Light
- Aya Brea from Parasite Eve
- Aya from Onechanbara
- Ayumi from X-Blades and Blades of Time
- Ayumi Shinozaki, Sachiko Shinozaki, Naomi Nakashima, Satsuki Mizuhara and Ayame Itou from Corpse Party
- Belle MacFae from Mystik Belle
- Caeda, Celica, Lachesis, Mareeta, Sue, Lyn, Lilina, Eirika, Elincia, Micaiah, Anna, Lissa, Lucina, Sumia, Robin, Hinoka, Camilla and Edelgard from Fire Emblem series
- Carmilla, Sypha Belnades, Maria Renard, Carrie Fernández, Shanoa, Charlotte Aulin, Stella Lecarde, Loretta Lecarde, Yoko and Celia Fortner from Castlevania series
- Christine from Arkista's Ring
- Coco Bandicoot, Nina Cortex, and Pasadena O'Possum from Crash Bandicoot series
- Cornet Espoir from Marl Kingdom
- Cortana from Halo
- Cotton the Witch from Cotton
- CJ from Eiyuden Chronicle: Rising
- Dawn from Contrast
- Dixie Kong and Tiny Kong from Donkey Kong Country 3: Dixie Kong's Double Trouble!, Donkey Kong 64 and Donkey Kong Country: Tropical Freeze
- Dana Mercer, Elizabeth Greene, and Sabrina Galloway from [PROTOTYPE] series
- Ellie from Monster Tale
- Serena from Phantis and Ultionus: A Tale of Petty Revenge
- Elspeth "Doc" Holliday from Blair Witch Volume I: Rustin Parr
- Emily Hartwood from Alone in the Dark
- Farah from Prince of Persia: The Sands of Time
- Fiona Belli from Demento
- Fuji / Elena from Sword of Mana (Mystic Quest)
- Fury from Darksiders III
- Fetch (Abigail Walker) from Infamous First Light
- Gabriella Saunders and Sara Hartwood from Alone in the Dark: Illumination
- Gaige, Lilith, Maya, Athena, Aurelia, Nisha, Mad Moxxi, Moze, Amara and Fiona from Borderlands
- Giana from Giana Sisters DS and Giana Sisters: Twisted Dreams
- Hat Girls from A Hat in Time
- Hibana from Nightshade (Kunoichi)
- Hinako Shirai from Blue Reflection
- Hiromi Tengenji from Burning Force
- Ihadurca from Fūjin Ryōiki Erutsuvāyu
- Isabel Greyhound, Maeve Falcon, Ornella, Eruina, Jezebeth and Biara from Heroes of Might and Magic V
- Janis from Inuyasha: Secret of the Divine Jewel
- Jen from Primal
- Jennifer from Rule of Rose
- Jennifer Simpson, Helen Maxwell, Alyssa Hale, and Alyssa Hamilton from Clock Tower
- Jenosa Arma from Scurge: Hive
- Jesse Faden from Control
- Josephine "Jo" (Mai Tsurugino) from Kendo Rage (Makeruna!)
- Juliet Starling from Lollipop Chainsaw
- Juli Kidman from The Evil Within
- Kate Walker from Syberia franchise
- Katjaa, Carley and Christa from The Walking Dead
- Katy and Lammy from Um Jammer Lammy
- Kawase Umihara from Umihara Kawase series
- Kit Ballard from Blade Kitten
- Konoko (Mai Hasegawa) from Oni
- Kurenai from Red Ninja: Blood River Dance
- Kya from Kya: Dark Lineage
- Latis from Bloody Vampire
- Layla from Layla
- Linda from Stretch Panic
- Lisa Rogan and Kate Green from The House of the Dead
- Luca from Labyrinth of Refrain: Coven of Dusk
- Lucia (Pheromone Contra), Tasha, Sheena Etranzi/CX-2, Black Viper, Tsugu-Min/BR-W9, Krystal, Sayuri, Sally Inohara, Erica Ricci, and Ms. Harakiri from Contra series
- Lucy from Whacked!
- Madeleine Valois from The Royal Trap
- Marina Liteyears from Mischief Makers
- Marlone from Atelier Marie: The Alchemist of Salburg
- Matsuri Kudo from Bleach: The 3rd Phantom
- Mannax from Blades of Vengeance
- Max Caulfied, Rachel Amber and Chloe Price from Life Is Strange and the prequel Before the Storm
- Mira from Star Wars Knights of the Old Republic II: The Sith Lords
- Momohime from Muramasa: The Demon Blade
- Mona De Lafitte from A Vampyre Story
- Marianne from The Medium
- Monica Flores and Rooney Simpson from NightCry
- Mia from Wife Quest
- Maya from Septerra Core
- Ms. Pac-Man from Ms. Pac-Man, Ms. Pac-Man Maze Madness and Ms. Pac-Man: Quest for the Golden Maze
- Nariko from Heavenly Sword
- Natasha Volkova and Tanya from Command & Conquer: Red Alert series
- Naomi Hayward from The Good Life
- Nicole Collard (in Broken Sword 2 in 5) from Broken Sword
- Norah and Beth from Let's Go Jungle!: Lost on the Island of Spice and Let's Go Island: Lost on the Island of Tropics
- Popful Mail from Popful Mail: Magical Fantasy Adventure
- Princess Ailish and Buki from Sudeki
- Princess Allura and Laegrinna from Trapt and Deception IV: Blood Ties
- Princess Kameo from Kameo: Elements of Power
- Princess Minerva from Princess Minerva
- Princess Rilule from Étoile Princesse
- Princess Sia from Lady Sia
- Princess Solange Blanchefleur de Lux from Code of Princess
- Rachel Alucard, Noel Vermillion, Es Mitsurugi (Nobody), Platinum the Trinity, Bullet, Celica A. Mercury, Makoto Nanaya, Kokonoe, Mu-12 and Nu-13 from BlazBlue
- Rin Kagura from Calling: Kuroki Chakushin
- Rianna Saren from Star Wars: Lethal Alliance
- Roll, Roll.EXE (NetNavi of Mayl Sakurai), Roll Caskett, Alia, Iris, Ciel, Aile, Ashe, and Luna Plaz from Mega Man series
- Rooney Simpson and Monica Flores from NightCry
- Rustea "Rusty" Sprincul from Rusty
- Sakura Shinguji and Erica Fontaine from Sakura Taisen
- Sarah Lyons from Fallout 3
- Sayo-chan/Pocky from KiKi KaiKai
- Sheena from Run Saber
- Shelly "Bombshell" Harrison from Bombshell and Ion Fury (formerly Ion Maiden)
- Saria from Twinkle Tale
- Skye from Darkened Skye
- Tennôboshi Uzume from Hyperdimension Neptunia series
- The Princess from Magical Pop'n
- Tron Bonne from The Misadventures of Tron Bonne
- Tiny Tina from Tiny Tina's Assault on Dragon Keep and Tiny Tina's Wonderlands
- Valkyrie from Valkyrie no Bōken: Toki no Kagi Densetsu and Valkyrie no Densetsu
- Vanessa Z. Schneider from P.N.03
- Virginia Maxwell from Wild Arms 3
- Velvet Crowe from Tales of Berseria
- Yuko Asou from Valis
- Lady Dahna from Dahna: Megami Tanjō
- Princess Yui Kutuna from Vanguard Princess
- Uranus, Ellis and Sofia from Battle Arena Toshinden
- Ulan from Astria Ascending
- Norah in Call of the Sea
- Amicia de Rune in A Plague Tale: Innocence
- Five survivors from School Girl/Zombie Hunter
- Laura Harris from D no Shokutaku/D's Diner
- Jeanette Marshall from Virtua Cop series
- Jean Clifford from Confidential Mission
- Arcueid Brunestud from Tsukihime
- Elle Moon from Clockwork Aquario
- Even from Lost in Random
- Kena from Kena: Bridge of Spirits
- Prisoner 849 from Unreal
- The woman from Tormented Souls
- Leah from Deadstorm Pirates
- The woman from Rogue Company
- Emily Hartwood from Alone in the Dark
- Survivors taking the place of any deceased survivors from ZombiU
- Youngs witches from Little Witch Nobeta
- The woman from Scars Above
- The woman from Ebola Village
- The woman from Lunar Eclipse
- Hazel Flood from South of Midnight
- Diana & Cleo from Deathwish Enforcers

== See also ==
- Girls with guns
- List of female superheroes
- List of female supervillains
- List of male action heroes and villains
- List of women warriors in folklore
- Women warriors in literature and culture
