= Devil Hunter =

Devil Hunter may refer to:

- Gabriel the Devil Hunter, a Marvel Comics character
- Devil Hunter (film), a 1980 West German horror film
- Devil Hunters, a 1989 Hong Kong action film
- Devil Hunter Yohko, a Japanese original video animation series

== See also ==
- Demon hunter (disambiguation)
