= List of male action heroes and villains =

This is a list of notable male action heroes and villains.

== List of heroes and villains ==
List of male action heroes and villains
Character	Actor(s)	Works and other notes	Ref.
Jack Ryan	Multiple	Works of Tom Clancy and its adaptations	
Magnum	Tom Selleck	TV series Magnum, P.I.	
Sherlock Holmes	Robert Downey Jr.	Films Sherlock Holmes (2009) and Sherlock Holmes: A Game of Shadows (2011)	
James Bond	Multiple	James Bond films	
Terminator	Arnold Schwarzenegger	Film The Terminator and subsequent Terminator films	
Indiana Jones	Harrison Ford	Films in Indiana Jones franchise	
Oliver Queen	Stephen Amell	TV series Arrow	
Rambo	Sylvester Stallone	Rambo films	
Daryl Dixon	Norman Reedus	TV series The Walking Dead	
Riddick	Vin Diesel	The Chronicles of Riddick films	
Mad Max	Mel Gibson	Mad Max films	
Jason Bourne	Matt Damon	Bourne films	
John McClane	Bruce Willis	Die Hard film series	
Frank Martin	Jason Statham	Transporter films	
Neo	Keanu Reeves	The Matrix films	

=== Male Action Villains ===
Character	Series / Franchise
Frieza	Dragon Ball
Cell	Dragon Ball
DIO	JoJo's Bizarre Adventure
Yoshikage Kira	JoJo's Bizarre Adventure
Sosuke Aizen	Bleach
Ulquiorra Cifer	Bleach
Ryomen Sukuna	Jujutsu Kaisen
Mahito	Jujutsu Kaisen
Toji Fushiguro	Jujutsu Kaisen
Muzan Kibutsuji	Demon Slayer
Kokushibo	Demon Slayer
Akaza	Demon Slayer
Madara Uchiha	Naruto
Orochimaru	Naruto
Nagato	Naruto
Obito Uchiha	Naruto
Meruem	Hunter × Hunter
Hisoka Morow	Hunter × Hunter
Chrollo Lucilfer	Hunter × Hunter
Tomura Shigaraki	My Hero Academia
All For One	My Hero Academia
Father	Fullmetal Alchemist
King Bradley	Fullmetal Alchemist
Griffith	Berserk
Donquixote Doflamingo	One Piece
Kaido	One Piece
Marshall D. Teach	One Piece
Johan Liebert	Monster
Garou	One-Punch Man

=== Western Male Action Heroes ===
Character
Batman
Superman
Spider-Man
Iron Man
Captain America
Thor
Wolverine
Deadpool
Blade
Daredevil
Black Panther
John Wick
Rambo
RoboCop
The Terminator
Indiana Jones
James Bond

=== Western Male Action Villains ===
Character
Joker
Thanos
Darkseid
Green Goblin
Doctor Doom
Magneto
Venom
Red Skull
Loki
Ultron
Bane
Deathstroke
Reverse-Flash
Homelander
General Zod
Agent Smith
Darth Vader
Emperor Palpatine

=== Video Games ===
Character	Video game / Franchise
Makoto Yuki	Persona 3
Yu Narukami	Persona 4
Ren Amamiya	Persona 5
Solid Snake	Metal Gear
Big Boss	Metal Gear
Leon S. Kennedy	Resident Evil
Chris Redfield	Resident Evil
Dante	Devil May Cry
Vergil	Devil May Cry
Kratos	God of War
Jin Sakai	Ghost of Tsushima
Ichiro Ogami	Sakura Wars
Seijuro Kamiyama	Sakura Wars
Ryu	Street Fighter
Ken Masters	Street Fighter
Scorpion	Mortal Kombat
Sub-Zero	Mortal Kombat
Agent 47	Hitman
Doom Slayer	Doom
Master Chief	Halo

== See also ==
- List of action film actors
- List of female action heroes and villains
- Bruceploitation
