= Demon Slayer =

Demon Slayer may refer to:

- Demon Slayer (shogi), a trap opening in shogi
- Demon Slayer: Kimetsu no Yaiba, a Japanese manga series
  - Demon Slayer: Kimetsu no Yaiba (TV series), a Japanese anime television series
  - Demon Slayer: Kimetsu no Yaiba – The Movie: Mugen Train, a 2020 Japanese anime film
  - Demon Slayer: Kimetsu no Yaiba – The Hinokami Chronicles, a 2021 video game
  - Demon Slayer: Kimetsu no Yaiba – To the Swordsmith Village, a 2023 Japanese anime film
  - Demon Slayer: Kimetsu no Yaiba – To the Hashira Training, a 2024 Japanese anime film
  - Demon Slayer: Kimetsu no Yaiba – The Movie: Infinity Castle, a 2025 Japanese anime film
  - Demon Slayer Corps, a fictional organization
- Demon Slayers, fictional families in the manga and anime series Omamori Himari
- Demon Slayer, a free-to-play quest in the MMORPG RuneScape
- Demon Slayers, a fictional clan formed by Sango, Kohaku, and other characters in the manga and anime series Inuyasha
- Demon-Slayer Sword, a fictional sword wielded by Asta in the manga and anime series Black Clover
- Revelations: The Demon Slayer, a 1992 video game
- Wu Kong (film), also titled Immortal Demon Slayer, a 2017 Chinese film

== See also ==
- Asuravadham (lit. 'Asura Slaying'), a 2018 Indian film
- Demon hunter (disambiguation)
- Devil-Slayer, a Marvel Comics character
