= Rynn =

Rynn can be both a given name and a surname. Notable people with this name include:

== Real people ==
=== As a given name ===
- Rynn Berry (1945–2014), American author and scholar
- Rynn Lim, Malaysian singer

=== As a surname ===
- Chris James and Patrick Rynn, American blues duo
- Marilyn Rynn (died 1995), Irish civil servant and murder victim

== Fictional characters ==
- Rynn (Drakan), the main character in the Drakan: Order of the Flame video game
