= List of action film actors =

Action film actors appear in action movies, a film genre in which one or more heroes are thrust into a series of challenges that typically include physical feats, extended fight scenes, violence, and frantic chases. Action films tend to feature a resourceful character struggling against incredible odds, which include life-threatening situations, a villain, or a pursuit which generally concludes in victory for the hero.

- Yahya Abdul-Mateen II
- Jensen Ackles
- Ben Affleck
- Jessica Alba
- Anthony Alonzo
- Dan Alvaro
- Gerald Anderson
- Gillian Anderson
- Jun Aristorenas
- Cüneyt Arkın
- Ana de Armas
- Gemma Arterton
- Steve Austin
- Morena Baccarin
- Amitabh Bachchan
- Kevin Bacon
- Joe Don Baker
- Adam Baldwin
- Christian Bale
- Antonio Banderas
- Ahmed El Sakka
- Drew Barrymore
- Angela Bassett
- Dave Bautista
- Sean Bean
- Kate Beckinsale
- Jamie Bell
- Zoë Bell
- David Belle
- Jean-Paul Belmondo
- Jim Belushi
- Julie Benz
- Tom Berenger
- Kathryn Bernardo
- Daniel Bernhardt
- Halle Berry
- Jon Bernthal
- Michael Biehn
- Jessica Biel
- Shane Black
- Emily Blunt
- Christian Boeving
- Bernard Bonnin
- Ernest Borgnine
- Johnny Yong Bosch
- Brian Bosworth
- Kate Bosworth
- Jeff Bridges
- Adrien Brody
- James Brolin
- Josh Brolin
- Charles Bronson
- Pierce Brosnan
- Jim Brown
- Reb Brown
- Sandra Bullock
- Steve Buscemi
- Gary Busey
- Richard Burgi
- Gerard Butler
- Nicolas Cage
- Michael Caine
- David Caruso
- Bruce Campbell
- Gina Carano
- Charisma Carpenter
- David Carradine
- Lynda Carter
- Henry Cavill
- John Cena
- Danny Chan Kwok Kwan
- Jackie Chan
- Jessica Chastain
- Don Cheadle
- Maggie Cheung
- David Chiang
- Shin'ichi Chiba
- Priyanka Chopra
- Cheng Pei-pei
- Chin Kar-lok
- Chow Yun-fat
- George Clooney
- James Coburn
- Jennifer Connelly
- Sean Connery
- Bradley Cooper
- Dominic Cooper
- Sharlto Copley
- Abbie Cornish
- Kevin Costner
- Jai Courtney
- Randy Couture
- Daniel Craig
- Terry Crews
- Russell Crowe
- Tom Cruise
- Penélope Cruz
- Ice Cube
- Jamie Lee Curtis
- Tony Curtis
- John Cusack
- Vincent D'Onofrio
- Mark Dacascos
- Alexandra Daddario
- James Badge Dale
- Timothy Dalton
- Matt Damon
- Gary Daniels
- Dingdong Dantes
- Ricky Davao
- Robert Davi
- Keith David
- Geena Davis
- Alain Delon
- Patrick Dempsey
- Robert De Niro
- Sunny Deol
- Johnny Depp
- Ajay Devgn
- Cameron Diaz
- Joko Diaz
- Vin Diesel
- Lexa Doig
- Kirk Douglas
- Michael Douglas
- Robert Downey Jr.
- Michael Dudikoff
- Bill Duke
- Eliza Dushku
- Sanjay Dutt
- Clint Eastwood
- Scott Eastwood
- Aaron Eckhart
- Gigi Edgley
- Jesse Eisenberg
- E.R. Ejercito
- Idris Elba
- Cary Elwes
- Emilio Estevez
- Gary Estrada
- Jinggoy Estrada
- Joseph Estrada
- Chris Evans
- Luke Evans
- Ejay Falcon
- Colin Farrell
- Michael Fassbender
- Oded Fehr
- Mark Anthony Fernandez
- Rudy Fernandez
- Tony Ferrer
- Lou Ferrigno
- Nathan Fillion
- Colin Firth
- Laurence Fishburne
- Isla Fisher
- Harrison Ford
- Robert Forster
- William Forsythe
- Ben Foster
- Matthew Fox
- Megan Fox
- Jamie Foxx
- James Franco
- Jason David Frank
- Brendan Fraser
- Rila Fukushima
- Gal Gadot
- Eddie Garcia
- Andrew Garfield
- Jennifer Garner
- Sarah Michelle Gellar
- Janno Gibbs
- Mel Gibson
- Tyrese Gibson
- Karen Gillan
- Danny Glover
- Ryan Gosling
- Cuba Gooding Jr.
- John Goodman
- Suresh Gopi
- Joseph Gordon-Levitt
- Louis Gossett Jr.
- Kelsey Grammer
- Erin Gray
- Pam Grier
- Frank Grillo
- Michael Gross
- Carla Gugino
- Richard Gutierrez
- Jake Gyllenhaal
- Gene Hackman
- Charles Hallahan
- Linda Hamilton
- Armie Hammer
- Tom Hanks
- Daryl Hannah
- David Harbour
- Tom Hardy
- Kit Harington
- Danielle Harris
- Naomie Harris
- Kevin Hart
- Josh Hartnett
- David Hasselhoff
- Anne Hathaway
- Rutger Hauer
- Ethan Hawke
- Salma Hayek
- Marg Helgenberger
- Tricia Helfer
- Chris Hemsworth
- Liam Hemsworth
- Lance Henriksen
- Mark Herras
- Charlton Heston
- Tom Hiddleston
- Emile Hirsch
- Hulk Hogan
- Tom Holland
- Djimon Hounsou
- Sibelle Hu
- Bryce Dallas Howard
- Vanessa Hudgens
- Ernie Hudson
- Brent Huff
- Lee Byung-hun
- Sammo Hung
- Josh Hutcherson
- Rhene Imperial
- Kadir İnanır
- Michael Ironside
- Jason Isaacs
- Tony Jaa
- Hugh Jackman
- Kate Jackson
- Samuel L. Jackson
- Theo James
- Vidyut Jammwal
- Thomas Jane
- Famke Janssen
- Scarlett Johansson
- Don Johnson
- Dwayne Johnson
- Angelina Jolie
- Felicity Jones
- Sam J. Jones
- Tommy Lee Jones
- Vinnie Jones
- Michael B. Jordan
- Milla Jovovich
- Anya Taylor-Joy
- Meiko Kaji
- Shashi Kapoor
- Ranbir Kapoor
- Lau Kar-leung
- Michael Keaton
- Toby Kebbell
- Miles O'Keeffe
- Mila Kunis
- Salman Khan
- Shah Rukh Khan
- Cynthia Khan
- Richard Kiel
- Rinko Kikuchi
- Val Kilmer
- Joel Kinnaman
- Ben Kingsley
- Vanessa Kirby
- Takeshi Kitano
- Keira Knightley
- Kane Kosugi
- Shô Kosugi
- Martin Kove
- Thomas Kretschmann
- Akshay Kumar
- David Krumholtz
- Chiaki Kuriyama
- Aaron Kwok
- Shia LaBeouf
- Lorenzo Lamas
- Christopher Lambert
- Burt Lancaster
- Sonny Landham
- Jess Lapid, Jr.
- Jess Lapid, Sr.
- Lito Lapid
- Mark Lapid
- Brie Larson
- Sanaa Lathan
- Andy Lau
- Taylor Lautner
- Lucy Lawless
- Jennifer Lawrence
- Martin Lawrence
- George Lazenby
- Bruce Lee
- Don Lee
- Jason Scott Lee
- Lee Min-ho
- Moon Lee
- Kier Legaspi
- Zoren Legaspi
- Al Leong
- Jet Li
- Evangeline Lilly
- Lucy Liu
- Simu Liu
- Angel Locsin
- Paul Logan
- Dolph Lundgren
- Kellan Lutz
- Anthony Mackie
- Michael Madsen
- Tobey Maguire
- Robert Maillet
- John Malkovich
- Rey Malonzo
- Joe Manganiello
- Edu Manzano
- Baldo Marro
- James Marsden
- Coco Martin
- Lee Marvin
- Michael de Mesa
- Matt McColm
- Matthew McConaughey
- Mary McDonnell
- Neal McDonough
- Rose McGowan
- Ewan McGregor
- Steve McQueen
- Ian McShane
- Daniela Melchior
- Johnny Messner
- Sasha Mitchell
- Rhona Mitra
- Mohanlal
- Jason Momoa
- Michelle Monaghan
- Cesar Montano
- Demi Moore
- Roger Moore
- Shemar Moore
- Chloë Grace Moretz
- Carrie-Anne Moss
- Dermot Mulroney
- Eddie Murphy
- Michael Murphy
- Liam Neeson
- Nichelle Nichols
- Rachel Nichols
- Jack Nicholson
- Brigitte Nielsen
- Connie Nielsen
- Nick Nolte
- Chuck Norris
- Edward Norton
- Warren Oates
- Bob Odenkirk
- Timothy Olyphant
- Victor Ortiz
- Yukari Ôshima
- Clive Owen
- Al Pacino
- Daniel Padilla
- Robin Padilla
- Rommel Padilla
- Michael Paré
- Anne Parillaud
- Ray Park
- Sonny Parsons
- Pedro Pascal
- Robert Patrick
- Robert Pattinson
- Paula Patton
- Guy Pearce
- Gregory Peck
- Simon Pegg
- Anthony Perkins
- Ron Perlman
- William Petersen
- Alex Pettyfer
- Ryan Phillippe
- Lou Diamond Phillips
- Chris Pine
- Brad Pitt
- Fernando Poe Jr.
- Natalie Portman
- Glen Powell
- Chris Pratt
- Freddie Prinze Jr.
- Florence Pugh
- Dominic Purcell
- Maggie Q
- Dennis Quaid
- Puneeth Rajkumar
- Cyril Raffaelli
- Édgar Ramírez
- Derek Ramsay
- Oliver Reed
- Christopher Reeve
- Keanu Reeves
- John Regala
- James Remar
- Jeremy Renner
- Jean Reno
- Ramon "Bong" Revilla Jr.
- Ramon Revilla, Sr.
- Efren Reyes Jr.
- Efren Reyes Sr.
- Burt Reynolds
- Ryan Reynolds
- Ving Rhames
- Ronnie Ricketts
- Alan Ritchson
- Marian Rivera
- Margot Robbie
- Eric Roberts
- Bembol Roco
- Eddie Rodriguez
- Michelle Rodriguez
- Miguel Rodriguez
- Henry Rollins
- Michael Rooker
- Monsour del Rosario
- Ruby Rose
- Hrithik Roshan
- Cynthia Rothrock
- Richard Roundtree
- Mickey Rourke
- Ronda Rousey
- Paul Rudd
- Kurt Russell
- Wyatt Russell
- Jeri Ryan
- Katee Sackhoff
- Zoe Saldaña
- Phillip Salvador
- Raymart Santiago
- Susan Sarandon
- Romnick Sarmenta
- John Saxon
- Catherine Schell
- Roy Scheider
- Arnold Schwarzenegger
- Tom Selleck
- Andy Serkis
- William Shatner
- Robert Shaw
- Charlie Sheen
- Sunil Shetty
- Robin Shou
- Tiger Shroff
- Elisabeth Shue
- Tom Sizemore
- Alexander Skarsgård
- Bill Skarsgård
- Tom Skerritt
- Christian Slater
- Will Smith
- Wesley Snipes
- Kevin Sorbo
- Jeff Speakman
- Sylvester Stallone
- Sebastian Stan
- Jason Statham
- Ray Stevenson
- Sharon Stone
- Kiefer Sutherland
- Hilary Swank
- Patrick Swayze
- Omar Sy
- Mr. T
- Cary-Hiroyuki Tagawa
- Amanda Tapping
- Joe Taslim
- Channing Tatum
- Ravi Teja
- Miles Teller
- Charlize Theron
- Uma Thurman
- Ti Lung
- Benicio del Toro
- Gina Torres
- John Travolta
- Danny Trejo
- Nicholas Tse
- Liv Tyler
- Mike Tyson
- Karl Urban
- Iko Uwais
- Emily VanCamp
- Jean-Claude Van Damme
- Casper Van Dien
- Vic Vargas
- Ronaldo Valdez
- Dante Varona
- Robert Vaughn
- Ian Veneracion
- Jesse Ventura
- Ace Vergel
- Joseph Vijay
- Sharni Vinson
- Roi Vinzon
- Yanin Vismitananda
- Jon Voight
- Lindsay Wagner
- Mark Wahlberg
- Paul Walker
- Fred Ward
- Denzel Washington
- Emma Watson
- Naomi Watts
- John Wayne
- Carl Weathers
- Sigourney Weaver
- Hugo Weaving
- Zhao Wei
- Rachel Weisz
- Raquel Welch
- Titus Welliver
- Peter Weller
- Vernon Wells
- Weng Weng
- Adam West
- Forest Whitaker
- David A.R. White
- Michael Jai White
- Billy Dee Williams
- Maisie Williams
- Fred Williamson
- Bruce Willis
- Don "The Dragon" Wilson
- Owen Wilson
- Jeff Wincott
- Kate Winslet
- Shailene Woodley
- Sam Worthington
- Simon Yam
- Donnie Yen
- Michelle Yeoh
- Gong Yoo
- Bolo Yeung
- Nan Yu
- Yuen Biao
- William Zabka
- Ramon Zamora
- Billy Zane
- Marko Zaror
- Zhang Ziyi
- Zaldy Zshornack
