= Deadstorm Pirates =

2010 video game

- Developers: Namco Bandai Games; Nex Entertainment (PS3)
- Publisher: Namco Bandai Games: EU: Sony Computer Entertainment (PS3)
- Platforms: Arcade, PlayStation 3
- Release: Arcade: WW: April 2010; PlayStation 3: NA: October 19, 2010; JP: October 21, 2010; EU: November 5, 2010
- Genre: Rail shooter
- Modes: Single-player, multiplayer

Deadstorm Pirates is a 2010 arcade light-gun rail shooter video game developed and published by Namco Bandai Games. This game was ported to PlayStation 3 using the PlayStation Move controller as a bonus game included with Time Crisis: Razing Storm in 2010; a standalone digital version was also available in Europe.

== Gameplay ==
=== Arcade version ===
Players select to play as one of two pirates, Eric and Leah, who are members of a crew looking for a lost treasure, Poseidon's Breath. To find this treasure, players must complete 4 stages fighting against undead pirates and other enemies. Players use a recoling light gun and mounted steering wheel to eliminate enemies and navigate past obstacles. Players choose which stage to start at the beginning of each stage, allowing players to choose in what order traverse through the game.

The game also offers two player co-op as well.

=== PlayStation 3 version ===
This game was included in the Time Crisis: Razing Storm compilation game for the PlayStation 3, utilizing the PlayStation Move Controller; it was also later available separately on the European PlayStation Store. Players can use the Move controller to aim at objects on the screen, requiring calibration each time the game is booted. As there is no mounted steering wheel in the home version, to navigate obstacles, players are prompted to rotate the controller in either clockwise or counterclockwise movements to turn right or left.

== Reception ==
Reviews of the PlayStation 3 version have ranged from average to positive reviews. Reviewer Jack O'Neill gave the game 6 out of 10, not bad, citing that the game fills a void in the pirate-themed video game genre. This reviewer noted that the light gun controls with the Move controller are responsive and accurate, but that the controls are limited to shooting and steering only. The game's short length also received criticism, with O'Neill stating that it can be beaten within 30 minutes. Other reviewers also stated that the game was quite fun and added great value to the Time Crisis: Razing Storm bundle, but didn't seem worth it on its own due to its simplicity and short length.

== Sequel ==
The game is followed by a sequel, Goldstorm Pirates.
