= Area 51 (disambiguation) =

Area 51 is a secret military facility in Nevada, north of Las Vegas.

Area 51 may also refer to:

== Places ==
- Area 51, troop barracks and MWR building on Camp Victory, Baghdad, Iraq
- AREA51Vegas, an immersive art experience complex in Las Vegas, Nevada

== Games ==
- Area 51 (series)
  - Area 51 (1995 video game), a light gun game developed by Atari
  - Area 51: Site 4, a 1998 sequel to the original
  - Area 51 (2005 video game), a first-person shooter game by Midway Austin
  - BlackSite: Area 51, a 2007 first-person shooter game by Midway Games

== Literature ==
- Area 51: An Uncensored History of America's Top Secret Military Base, a 2011 book by Annie Jacobsen
- Area 51, a science-fiction novel by Bob Mayer under the pseudonym Robert Doherty

== Other uses ==
- Area 51 (film), a 2015 film by Oren Peli
- Area 51, a staging zone for new Q&A websites, part of the Stack Exchange Network
- Area-51, a line of gaming computers from Dell subsidiary Alienware
- Area 51, a nickname used for the duo comprising Stephon Castle and Victor Wembanyama of the San Antonio Spurs

== See also ==
- Area 52 (disambiguation)
- Area (disambiguation)
- 51 (disambiguation)
- Hangar 18 (disambiguation)
