= Hangar (disambiguation) =

A hangar is a structure built to house aircraft.

"Hangar" may also refer to:

== Structures ==
=== In general ===
- Airship hangar, a hangar for lighter-than-air aircraft
- Bellman hangar, a type of temporary hangar designed in 1936
- Bessonneau hangar, a type of temporary hangar designed in 1908
- Blister hangar, a type of portable hangar designed in 1939
- Tee hangar, a type of hangar used primarily for general aviation aircraft
- Underground hangar, a type of hangar used for military aircraft

=== Specific structures ===
==== In use as aviation hangars ====
- The Hangar Flight Museum, Calgary, Alberta, Canada; at the Calgary International Airport; a museum storing aircraft
- Hangar One (Los Angeles, California), a hangar at Los Angeles International Airport
- Hangar-7, a building in Salzburg, Austria that houses a collection of historical aircraft
- Ispahani Hangar, a hangar used by Pakistan International Airlines at Jinnah International Airport in Karachi, Pakistan
- Lower Souris National Wildlife Refuge Airplane Hangar, a hangar at the J. Clark Salyer National Wildlife Refuge in North Dakota
- Riverside Hangar, hangars at St. Paul Downtown Airport in St. Paul, Minnesota

==== No longer aviation hangars ====
- Hangar AE, a NASA facility at the Kennedy Space Center
- Hangar H, a building on Magretheholm in Copenhagen, Denmark
- Hangar No. 1, Lakehurst Naval Air Station, a former airship hangar best known as the site of the Hindenburg disaster
- Hangar One (Mountain View, California), a former airship hangar and one of the world's largest freestanding structures
- Hangar Theatre, a theatre in Ithaca, New York
- Hangar 9, Brooks City-Base, a hangar in San Antonio, Texas, the oldest U.S. Air Force hangar
- King Airfield Hangar, a historic hangar in Taunton, Massachusetts
- Weeksville Dirigible Hangar, a former airship hangar in Elizabeth City, North Carolina

==== Other facilities and structures ====
- The Hangar, Melbourne, Australia, a sports facility for the Essendon Football Club in the Australian Football League
- Hangar (Lancaster, California), a minor-league baseball stadium
- Hangares metro station, a metro station in Mexico City, Mexico
- Station Les Hangars (Tram de Bordeaux), a metro station in Bordeaux, France

== Places ==
- Hangar, Iran
- Hangar-e Pain, Iran
- Le Hangar (Îlots des Apôtres), Crozet Islands, French Southern and Antarctic Lands, France; an islet

== Media ==
- INXS: Live at Barker Hangar, an album by INXS
- Hangar 17, a children's show from the early 1990s
- Hangar 18 (band), a hip hop group
- Hangar 18 (film), a 1980 science fiction film
- "Hangar 18" (song), a song by Megadeth
- Who's Landing in My Hangar?, an album by Human Switchboard

== Other ==
- The American Airlines Center in Dallas, Texas, known by some fans as "The Hangar"
- Hangar One Vodka, a vodka from Alameda, California
- Hangar rash, a term for minor aircraft damage due to mishandling on the ground
- Hangar 8, a private-jet management company
- Hangar 9, a line of radio-controlled model aircraft
- Ava Hangar, Italian drag queen

== See also ==
- Hangar One (disambiguation)
- Hangar 18 (disambiguation)
- Hanger (disambiguation)
