= Area 51 (1995 video game) =

- Arcade flyer
- Developer: Mesa Logic (Note: Ported to PC, PlayStation and Sega Saturn by Tantalus and Perfect Entertainment)
- Publishers: Time Warner Interactive (Note: Published under the Atari Games label); Consoles: NA: Midway Home Entertainment; EU: GT Interactive
- Producer: Rob Rowe
- Designers: Mike Hally; Robert Weatherby; Steve Caterson
- Programmers: David Mahaffey; Charlie Grisafi
- Artists: James Webb; David Dempsey; James Mestemaker; Guy Fumagalli; Hector Silva
- Composers: Jeanne Parson; Michael Stein (uncredited)
- Series: Area 51
- Platforms: Arcade, Windows, Sega Saturn, PlayStation
- Release: November 1995: Arcade; NA: November 1995 Windows; NA: October 1996 Saturn; NA: November 20, 1996; EU: March 14, 1997 PlayStation; NA: November 26, 1996; EU: May 1, 1997
- Genre: Light gun shooter
- Modes: Single-player, multiplayer
- Arcade system: Atari CoJag

Area 51 is a 1995 light gun shooter video game developed by Mesa Logic and published by Time Warner Interactive under its Atari Games label for arcades. The game involves the player taking part in a Strategic Tactical Advanced Alien Response (STAAR) military incursion to prevent aliens known as the Kronn, as well as alien-created zombies, from taking over the Area 51 military facility.

Produced as a last-ditch effort to reverse Atari's struggling fortunes, Area 51 largely underwhelmed critics, who compared it unfavorably to contemporary light gun shooters such as Virtua Cop 2, but was well-liked by players and became a major hit. The game was ported to the PlayStation, Sega Saturn and Windows. Atari further capitalized on its success with Maximum Force, which used the same arcade board and similar graphics techniques and gameplay, and a direct sequel, Area 51: Site 4.

== Gameplay ==
A screenshot showing the player engaging in a battle with multiple opponents

The game takes the player through several sections of the Area 51 facility, including a warehouse and tunnels. The player character is tasked, along with fellow Special Tactical Advanced Alien Response (STAAR) members Lieutenant Stephanie Grant and Sergeant Major Marcus Bradley, to penetrate Area 51 and activate the nuclear self-destruct sequence. The player must defeat genetically modified zombie soldiers and aliens without harming any allied STAAR team members. If nothing but three STAAR team members are shot, the Kronn Hunter mode is started, taking the role of a Hunter, sent by the Kronn to eliminate the rebels.

There are five types of weaponry available. While the player is only given a semi-automatic pistol in the beginning, weapon upgrades are available as targets. The pistol can be upgraded to an automatic machine gun, a pump shotgun, and finally an automatic shotgun. The shotgun weaponry allows a greater field of error for targeting an enemy. Both the machine gun and automatic shotgun allow the player to keep the trigger pressed down to unleash rounds. If the player character is hit by the enemy at any time, the weapon is downgraded back to the pistol.

Grenades are hidden in crates and bonus rooms. When used, they destroy most on screen enemies at once. The player can hold a maximum of nine grenades. In addition, yellow boxes and barrels marked with "flammable" warning symbols can be shot to cause fires or explosions that can harm enemies. By shooting certain objects in the correct sequence, players can unlock shooting exercises, weapon stashes, and bonus items that are not available in the main game plot. Other backdoors allow players to warp ahead to later levels instead of following the game's otherwise linear path.

There are many types of aliens/alien zombies including ones that shoot, punch, fire rockets, and throw things like bricks, grenades, and barrels. Purple alien/alien zombies require more hits than other targets.

== Development ==
An Area 51 arcade cabinet

In 1994, Atari Games was in desperate need of a hit, having gone years without a single profitable game and losing most of their most talented developers to rival publisher Electronic Arts. As such, they directed Ed Logg to create a light gun shooter, which was one of the most popular game genres in arcades at the time. However, Logg also left to join Electronic Arts while the game, Bounty Hunter, was still unfinished. At this point executives at Atari Games felt it would be safer to entrust development to an external team, and approached Mesa Logic head Robert Weatherby about his team (Hector Silva, James Mestemaker, Guy Fumagali and James Webb) taking over Bounty Hunter. After playing Bounty Hunter and finding it underwhelming, Weatherby asked for a few months to come up with and develop a pitch for his own gun game concept, to which Atari agreed.

Weatherby received the inspiration for the Area 51 concept from an article in Popular Science called "Searching for the Secrets of Groom Lake".

Originally the data from the game was to be streamed from a CD player using Cinepak for compression, but since this could only produce a letterboxed display, lead programmer Charlie Grisafi opted to instead run the game on a COJAG (a modified Atari Jaguar used in arcade games) interfaced with a hard disk drive and using Grisafi's own custom compression software. Grisafi recalled:

The amount of rendering required was a huge obstacle. It was originally done by Robert [Weatherby]'s team in Texas but as time went on, the raw horsepower required to do it all became more than they had. I realized that the Silicon Graphics workstations of all the different teams at Atari in California could be a huge resource for doing this. Atari helped us coordinate getting access to all of the systems in the building after hours when the other teams weren't using their systems, so every night we would take over and turn all the SGI systems at Atari into a large render farm.

The game uses digitized video stored on the on-board hard disk, and gibs into which every enemy blows apart when shot, in exactly the same way. While enemies, civilians, and explosions are 2D digitized video sprites, the levels and vehicles are pre-rendered in 3D. While the STAAR members were rendered with motion capture, the assorted enemies were created with stop motion animation by Sneaky Pete Kleinow.

== Release ==
The arcade game was released in 1995 under the Atari Games label by Time Warner Interactive, a short-lived merger between Time Warner Interactive Group, Atari Games, and the latter's subsidiary Tengen. Atari Games was purchased by WMS Industries the following year; as a result, ports for PlayStation, Sega Saturn, and Windows were released in 1996 by WMS's Midway Home Entertainment subsidiary. The PlayStation version was re-released in 2001 by Midway as part of their Midway Classics range. Tiger Electronics later released a handheld version of the game with an LCD screen and a small light gun.

The PlayStation version supports fullscreen play, while the Saturn version has a border covering about 15% of the screen. The Saturn version supports all of the console's light guns. The PlayStation version supports the Konami Justifier, but not the Namco GunCon.

Despite the arcade version running on a modified Atari Jaguar, it was never ported on to the system itself. According to Atari Games, by the time of Area 51's release, the company no longer saw the Jaguar as a viable platform.

== Reception ==
Reception

Review scores
Publication	Score
AllGame	4.5/5 (ARC); 2.5/5 (PS1); 4/5 (SAT)
Computer and Video Games	1/10 (PS1)
Electronic Gaming Monthly	5.675/10 (SAT)
GameSpot	7.1/10 (SAT)
IGN	7/10 (SAT)
Next Generation	3/5 (ARC); 2/5 (PS1)
Computer Games Magazine	2/5 (PC)
Sega Saturn Magazine	72% (SAT)

Area 51 was a major hit in arcades, selling over 20,000 cabinets. It was cited as the first step in a comeback for Atari Games which brought the company from the brink of financial collapse to being a major force in the arcade industry over just a little more than a year. Executive producer Mark Pierce recalled that the home versions had above average sales by the standards of console light gun games (which typically did not sell as well as other arcade ports, since players could not get the full experience without purchasing a light gun for the console).

Next Generation's review of the arcade version stated that "Area 51 provides shooters with what they want", noting in particular the dark and varied levels, realistic and graduated scenery, intriguing story themes, and fun power-ups. Despite this, the reviewer concluded that the game "stands up better against shooters of the past like Virtua Cop 1 and Mad Dog McCree, and not the current crop." The game took the number one slot in the December 1995 "Player's Choice" chart of RePlay Magazine.

The Saturn port received middling reviews. Critics typically commented that the game is good fun on its own terms but does not compare well to Virtua Cop 2, which was released for the Saturn at roughly the same time. The graphics received mixed remarks due to the graininess of the FMV and the presence of screen borders, and like most console light gun games it was criticized as having very low longevity.

The four reviewers of Electronic Gaming Monthly also found the game too easy, though they praised the retention of all the secret rooms from the arcade version. Lee Nutter summarized in Sega Saturn Magazine, "As shoot 'em ups go Area 51 is not a bad effort, but outclassed by the [Virtua] Cop games in every conceivable way." GamePro gave Area 51 one of its more positive reviews, praising its frenzied pace and concluding, "Area 51's sizzling action easily overcomes its sizable flaws. It's a must for diehard shooters and a superb rental for everyone else."

Jeff Kitts of GameSpot called it "a topnotch shooter". Unlike other reviewers, he found the game's challenge and multiple difficulty levels give it sufficient longevity, and deemed the graphics "superb", citing the constant action and plot development playing out in the photorealistic backgrounds. In a 1998 review of the Saturn version, IGN, while remarking that the game lacks sufficient playtime or extras to last long and does not measure up to Virtua Cop 2, found it to be a well-designed and fun experience in both single player and two-player mode.

Steve Bauman of Computer Games Magazine gave the PC version two stars out of five and wrote, "This is a perfect example why you don't convert some arcade games to the PC." Bauman called the game "repetitive and boring" because of its lack of the arcade version's light gun.

The PlayStation version was largely ignored by contemporary reviewers. A Next Generation reviewer criticized the conversion, but mainly emphasized that Area 51 as a 1997 console game lacked the excitement it had aroused as an arcade game in 1995. He did, however, praise the music and sound effects.

In a retrospective review of the arcade version, Brad Cook of AllGame wrote, "Not only is this game fun, it's not incredibly hard either. [...] The graphics are extremely well done, and it's very fast-paced." He also praised the storyline, attract mode, and varied backgrounds. Anthony Baize of AllGame called the PlayStation version "very exciting." Baize remarked that while the graphics are not as good as the arcade version, they are still solid, and the unlimited continues gives it an advantage over the arcade version. AllGame praised the Saturn version's music and sound, and recommended that players use a light gun instead of a joypad. AllGame also wrote that the graphics were, "Not as crisp as the PS and PC versions but good for the Saturn." In 2001, Stephen Fulljames of Computer and Video Games reviewed the PlayStation version and wrote that it "plays as if it's on rails - the pre-rendered environments offering a totally predictable environment. We challenge anyone not to be bored within a week."

== Sequel and related games ==
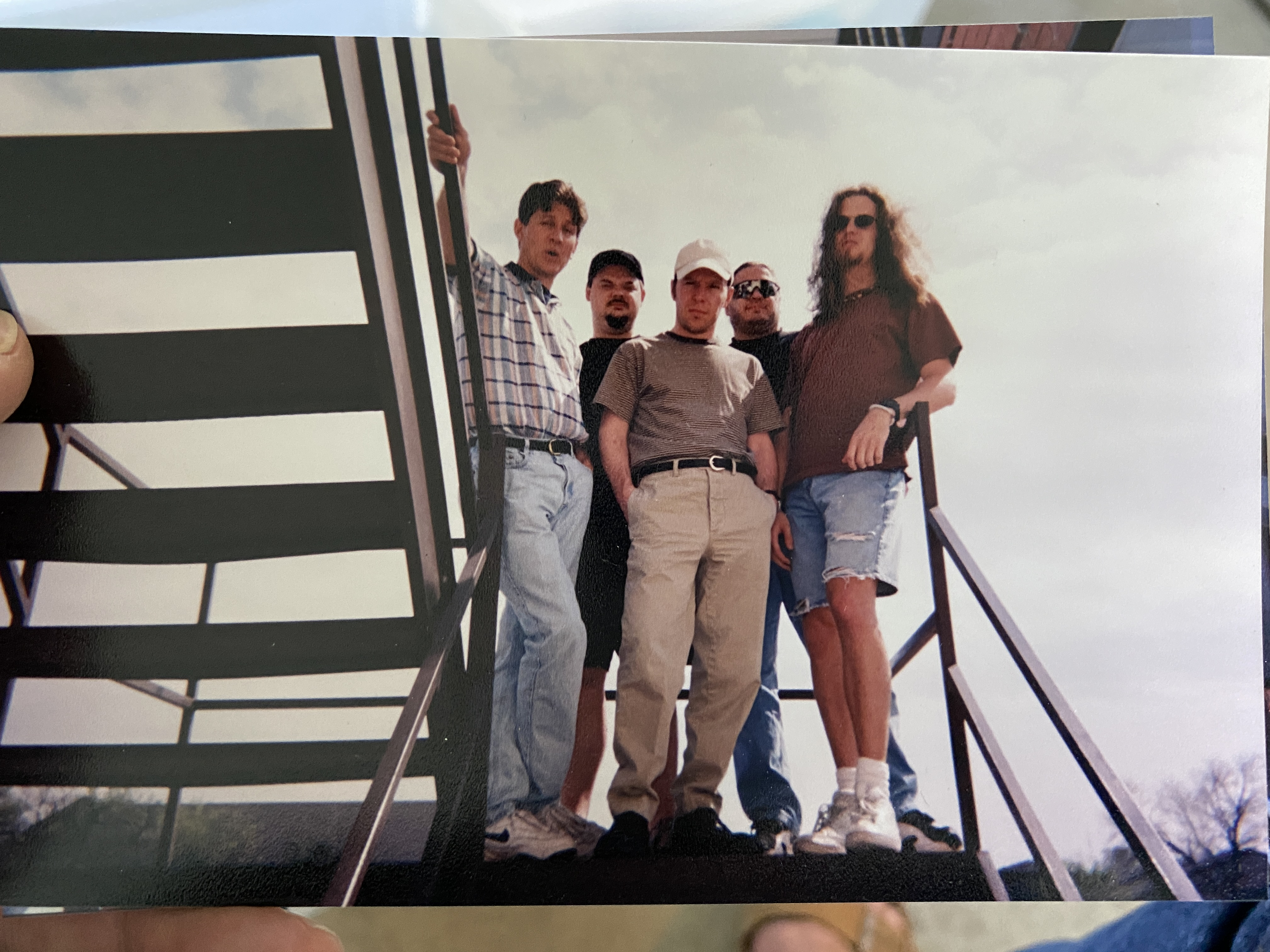
Mesa Logic Team (1993-94?)

In 1997, Atari Games and Mesa Logic released Maximum Force, a spiritual successor to Area 51 with identical gameplay and aesthetic elements; both games were later re-released in 1998 as one machine called Area 51/Maximum Force Duo. Also in 1998, an arcade sequel titled Area 51: Site 4 was released.

In 2005, a first-person shooter which shares the name and uses the original as an inspiration was released for the PlayStation 2, Xbox, and PC by Midway Games. It features a more sophisticated storyline and the voices of David Duchovny, Marilyn Manson, and Powers Boothe, and was well-received; the original arcade game makes a brief appearance here as well. In 2007, Midway released BlackSite: Area 51 to PC, Xbox 360, and PlayStation 3, which was received poorly.
