= Terminal Aérea metro station =

Mexico City Metro station

Terminal Aérea
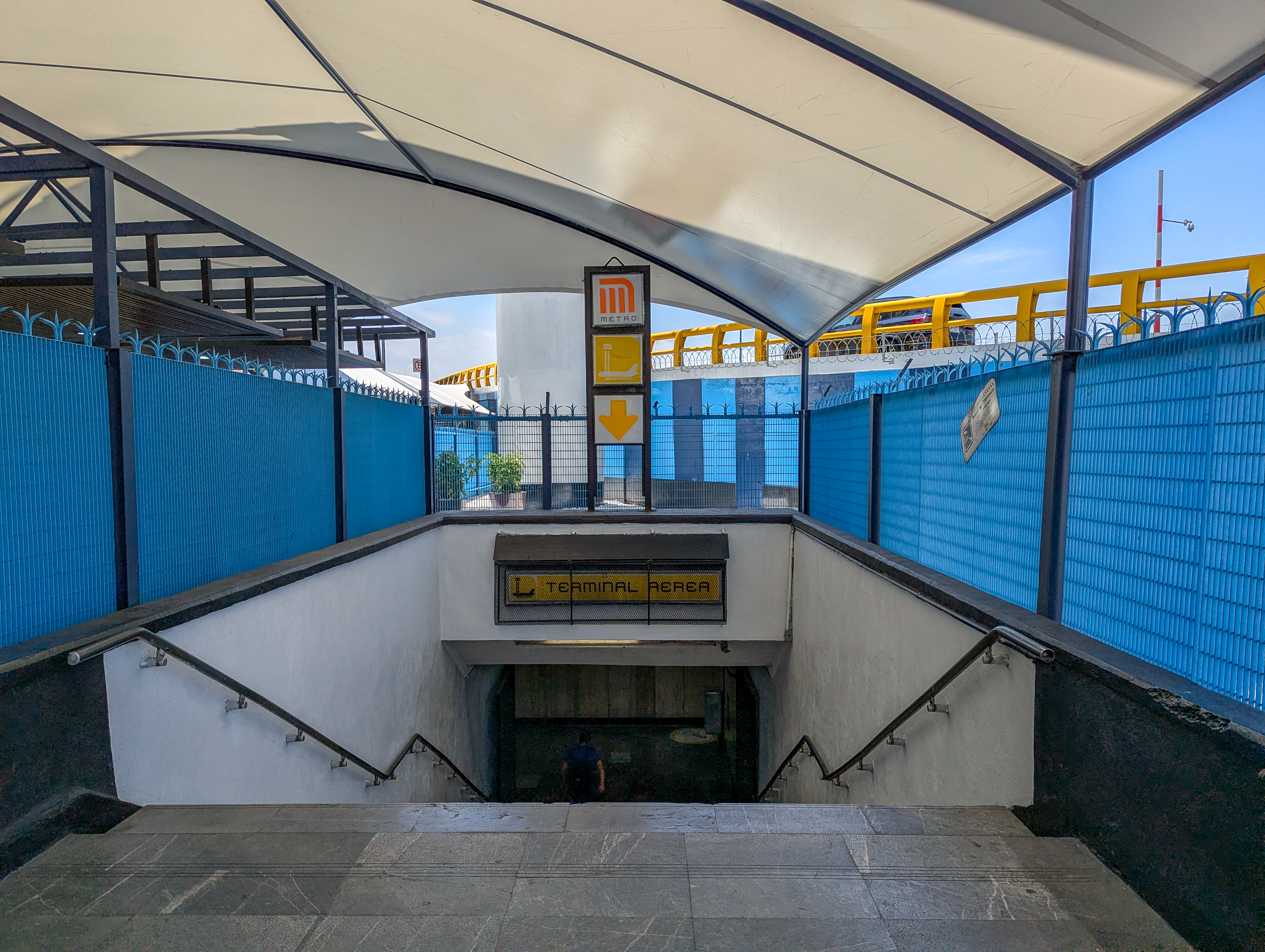
- Station entrance, 2026

General information
- Location: Puerto Aéreo Boulevard; Venustiano Carranza, Mexico City; Mexico
- Coordinates: 19°26′01″N 99°05′16″W
- System: Mexico City Metro
- Owner: Government of Mexico City
- Operator: Sistema de Transporte Colectivo (STC)
- Platforms: 2 side platforms
- Tracks: 2
- Connections: Mexico City International Airport; Aerotrén; Terminal 1; Routes: 43, 200; Trolleybus Line 4: Terminal Aérea; Route: 20-B

Construction
- Structure type: Underground

Other information
- Status: In service

History
- Opened: 19 December 1981; 44 years ago

Passengers
- 2025: 5,310,560 (Note: The system's website counts only passenger entries into stations and does not include passengers passing through, transferring between lines, or exiting the station. The data here is limited to the most recent ten years to avoid excessive listings; earlier figures can be found in this page's history or on the Mexico City Metro website. To calculate the average daily ridership, the annual total is divided by 365 days (366 in leap years), with decimals omitted from the result. Each station per line is ranked individually, as the system counts transfer stations separately. The percentage change is calculated automatically using the data from the current year and the previous year.) ▲4.07%
- Rank: 97/195

Services
| Preceding station | Mexico City Metro | Following station |
|---|---|---|
| Oceanía toward Politécnico | Line 5 | Hangares toward Pantitlán |
Out-of-system transfer (airplane passengers only)
| Preceding station | Aerotrén | Following station |
| Terminus | Aerotrén transfer at Terminal 1 | Terminal 2 Terminus |
Route map
Location
- Location within Mexico City
- Area map and exits

Terminal Aérea metro station (Note: Estación del Metro Terminal Aérea. Spanish pronunciation: [teɾmiˈnal aˈe.ɾea]. The name of the station literally means "Air Terminal" in Spanish, and it is known in English as Air Terminal station.) is a station on the Mexico City Metro in the city's borough of Venustiano Carranza. It is an underground station with two side platforms serving Line 5 (Yellow Line), located between Oceanía and Hangares stations. It opened on 19 December 1981, providing service northwest toward Consulado station and east toward Pantitlán station.

Terminal Aérea serves Mexico City International Airport and the nearby colonias (neighborhoods) of Peñón de los Baños and Moctezuma 2ª Sección along Boulevard Puerto Aéreo. Its pictogram depicts an airliner and a control tower, reflecting the station's proximity to the airport's Terminal 1. The station also has six murals painted by David Lach.

In 2025, the station had an average daily ridership of 14,549 passenger entries, ranking it the 97th busiest station in the network.

== Location and layout ==
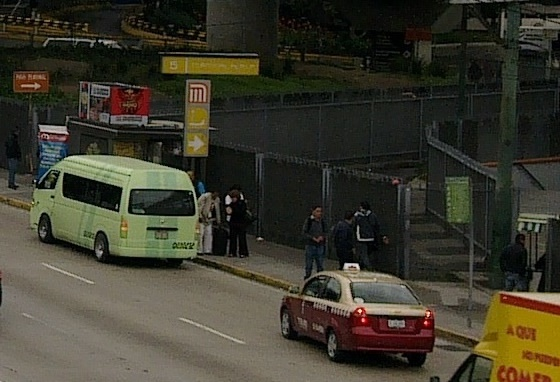
The Terminal Aérea bus stop seen from Boulevard Puerto Aéreo

Terminal Aérea is an underground metro station on Line 5 on Boulevard Puerto Aéreo, in the Venustiano Carranza borough, in eastern Mexico City. It is located approximately 200 meters (660 ft) from the entrance to Gate A of Terminal 1 at Mexico City International Airport. It serves two Colonias ("neighborhoods") of Peñón de los Baños and Moctezuma 2ª Sección.

Terminal Aérea metro station has two exits leading to Boulevard Puerto Aéreo, though neither provides direct access to the airport. The east exit is at the corner of Calle Aeropuerto Civil, in Peñón de los Baños, while the western entrance is found between Calle Norte 33 and Calle Oriente 33 in Moctezuma 2ª Sección. In its Policy Review of Mexico, the Organization for Economic Co-operation and Development criticized the station for lacking adequate signage and for not being designed for first-time travelers, noting that passengers "must negotiate over 110 steps" to reach it.

Terminal Aérea is located between Oceanía and Hangares stations on the line. The area is also served by Terminal 1 station of the Metrobús service, Line 4 (formerly Line G) of the trolleybus system, Routes 43 and 200 of the Red de Transporte de Pasajeros network, by Route 20-B of the city's public bus system, and the airport's people mover, Aerotrén.

=== Landmarks ===
Terminal Aérea station has six murals painted in 1981 by Mexican artist David Lach, making him the first person to create murals inside the Mexico City Metro. Four of the murals, collectively titled Paisajes cálidos y fríos (transl. Warm and Cold Landscapes, are located on the platform's headwalls, with the Cálidos murals on the southern walls and the Fríos murals on the northern walls. According to Lach, the red and green colors symbolize direction and temperature. The other two murals, Tlaltilco in the eastern lobby and Cuitzeo in the western lobby, blend elements of pre-Columbian culture with contemporary Mexican imagery.

Near Terminal Aérea metro station, a pedestrian bridge known as "MacPuente" serves as an informal observation deck where people gather to watch airplanes land and take off.

== History and construction ==
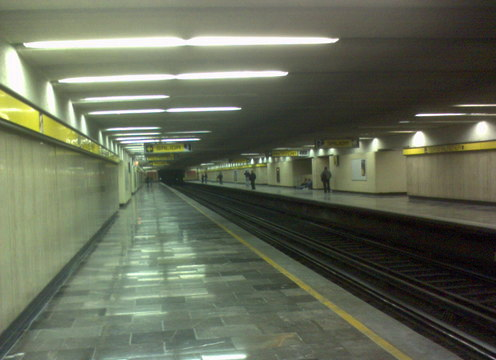
The station platforms in 2006

Line 5 of the Mexico City Metro was constructed by Cometro, a subsidiary of Empresas ICA. Its first section, where Terminal Aérea station is located, opened on 19 December 1981, running from Pantitlán to Consulado stations.

Terminal Aérea metro station was built with Santo Tomás marble floors, travertine marble walls, and rustic-textured stucco plafond. The track section between Oceanía and Terminal Aérea stations spans 1,174 meters (3,852 ft), and descends from ground level to the underground section, with a 4.9 percent slope when the line opened. The opposite section toward Hangares, which is 1,153 meters (3,783 ft) long, was built using slurry walls and the Milan method.

Near the station, in Peñon de los Baños, workers discovered the remains of mammoths, bison, horses, camels, birds, and fish, as well as a Teotihuacan settlement.

=== Name and pictogram ===
Before Terminal Aérea metro station was built, Mexico City International Airport was serviced by the Aeropuerto metro station on Line 1 (Pink line), located 15 blocks away to the south. After Terminal Aérea station was opened, many passengers continued to disembark at Aeropuerto station because of its confusing name and airliner pictogram. It was not until 1997 that Aeropuerto station was renamed "Boulevard Puerto Aéreo", and its pictogram was changed to depict a bridge with a dome beneath it, reflecting nearby landmarks. By contrast, the pictogram for Terminal Aérea metro station depicts an airliner in front of a control tower.

=== Incidents ===
On 4 May 2015, a train collided at Oceanía metro station when a train arriving from Terminal Aérea crashed into another one parked at the end of the platform. Authorities attributed the crash to brake failure, coupled with heavy rain and hail. Terminal Aérea station was temporarily closed for repairs after the accident.

Since 1981, subsidence caused by rain had increased the slope between Oceanía and Terminal Aérea to at least seven percent. To address further sinkings, authorities planned a 1 km (0.62 mi) tunnel extension, but the project was canceled because of budget constraints. Instead, an 800 m (0.50 mi) rain shield costing Mex$65 million was built to prevent the tracks from getting wet and reduce the risk of trains sliding.

From 1 to 16 March 2020, Terminal Aérea, Hangares, and Pantitlán stations were closed due to a gasoline leak at a nearby gas station.

Unlike other key metro stations that were renovated to accommodate the expected tourist demand ahead of the 2026 FIFA World Cup, Terminal Aérea metro station did not undergo any major renovations. La Jornada reported in March 2026 that the station had damp walls, saltpeter buildup on the ceilings, a grated drain with leaks, rusted metal structures, sheets and wires used to cover leaks, nonfunctional lamps, and dirty mural cases. The water-related issues worsen during the rainy season. In the same year, a guide rail expanded in the section leading to Hangares station, reportedly because of heat, causing a partial closure for most of the day on 7 May.

== Ridership ==
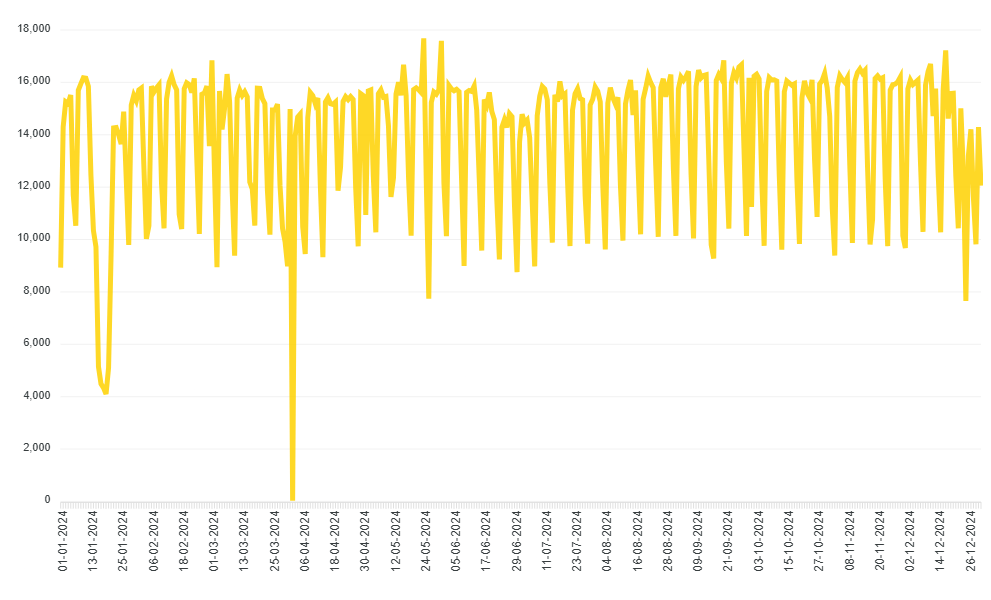
Daily ridership for Terminal Aérea station in 2024

According to official data, before the impact of the COVID-19 pandemic, the station recorded between 16,700 and 18,400 average daily entries from 2016 to 2019. In 2025, it recorded 5,310,560 passenger entries, ranking 97th among the system's 195 stations.

Annual passenger ridership
| Year | Ridership | Average daily | Rank | % change | Ref. |
|---|---|---|---|---|---|
| 2025 | 5,310,560 | 14,549 | 97/195 | +4.07% | |
| 2024 | 5,102,670 | 13,941 | 93/195 | −10.76% | |
| 2023 | 5,718,207 | 15,666 | 79/195 | −0.15% | |
| 2022 | 5,727,082 | 15,690 | 69/195 | +29.58% | |
| 2021 | 4,419,693 | 12,108 | 64/195 | +12.09% | |
| 2020 | 3,943,045 | 10,773 | 92/195 | −41.25% | |
| 2019 | 6,712,062 | 18,389 | 96/195 | +1.13% | |
| 2018 | 6,637,343 | 18,184 | 100/195 | +5.65% | |
| 2017 | 6,282,484 | 17,212 | 105/195 | +2.70% | |
| 2016 | 6,117,190 | 16,713 | 108/195 | +3.03% | |

== Gallery ==
Murals by David Lach

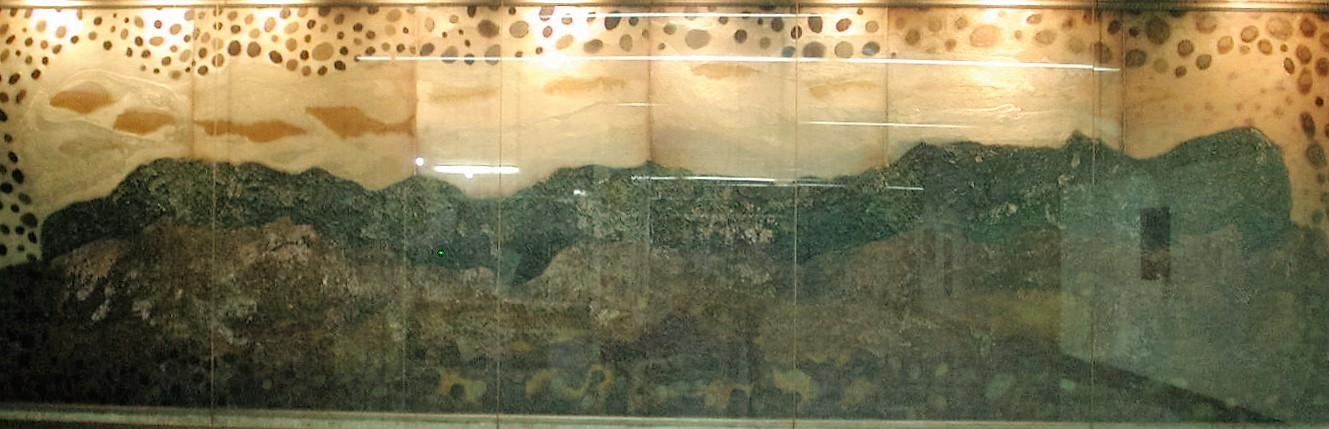
Cuitzeo, in honor of pre-Hispanic cultures

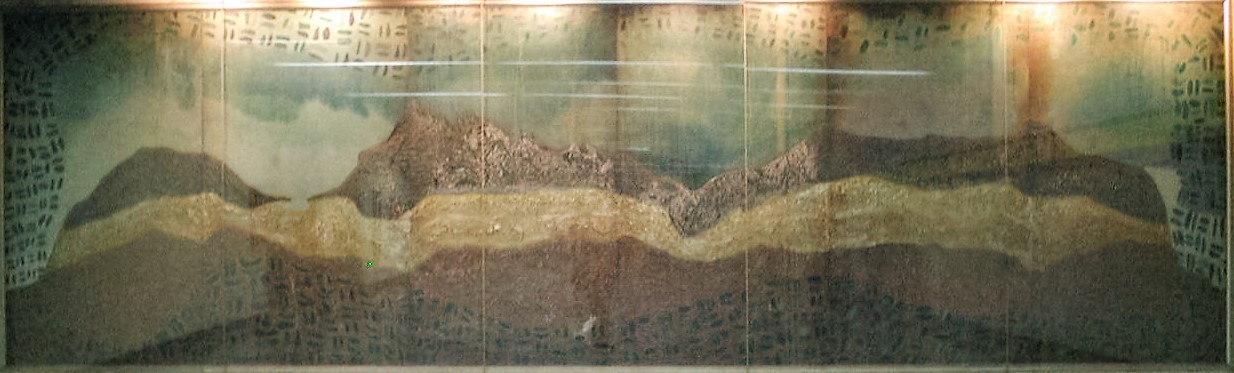
Tlatilco, in honor of pre-Hispanic cultures

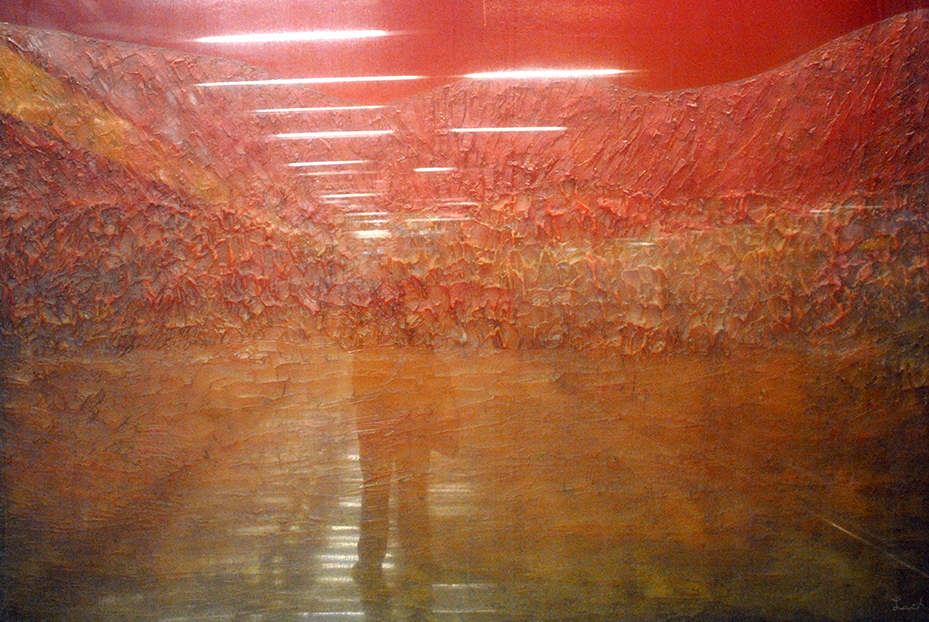
One of the Paisajes Cálidos

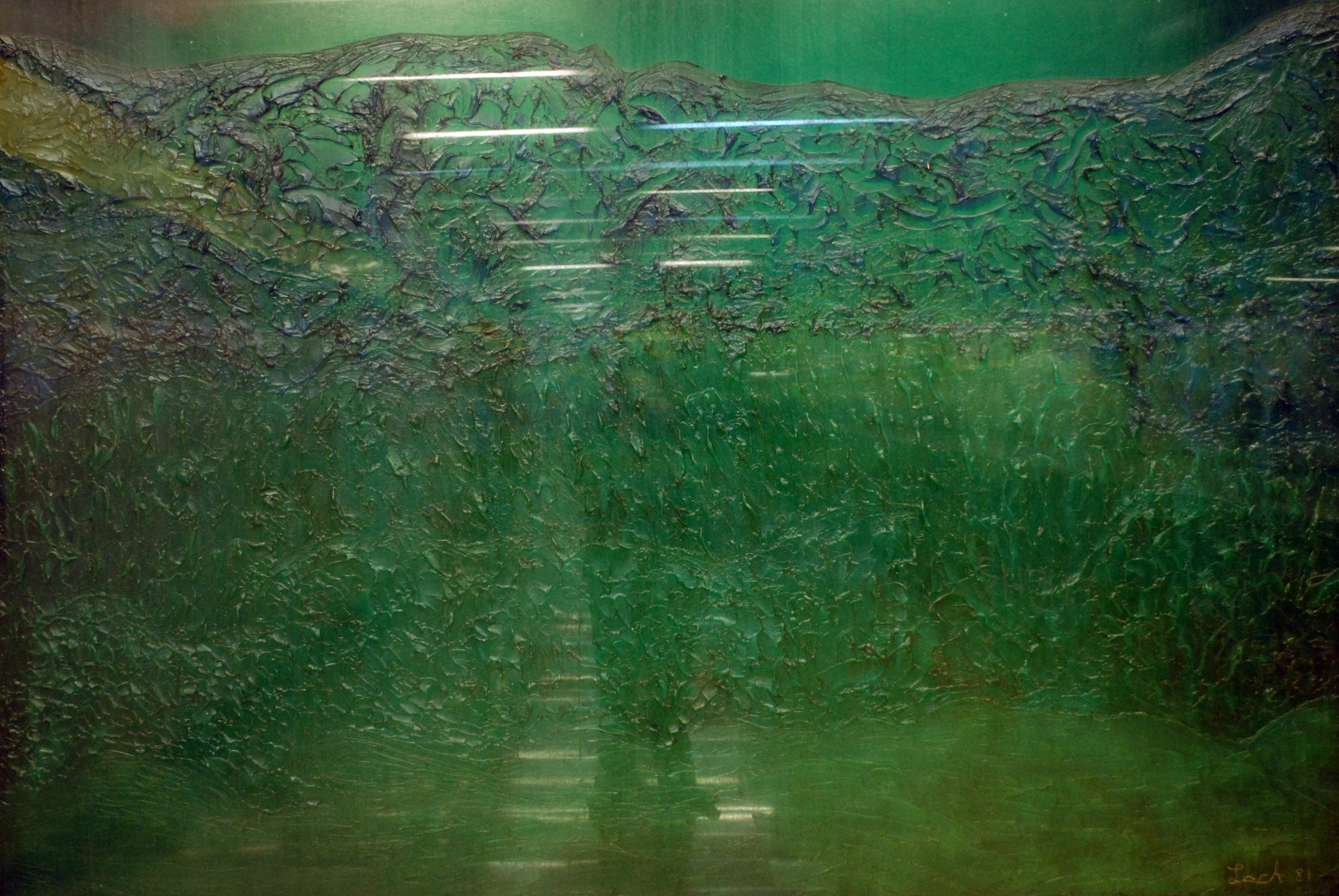
One of the Paisajes Fríos

There are multiple murals inside Terminal Aérea station.
