= Area 51 (series) =

- Genres: Light gun shooter, first-person shooter
- Developers: Mesa Logic (1995-1999); Midway Studios Austin (2005-2008)
- Publishers: Time Warner Interactive (1995); Atari Games (1995-1999); Midway Games (2005-2008)
- Platforms: Arcade, PlayStation, PlayStation 2, PlayStation 3, Xbox, Xbox 360, Sega Saturn, Windows
- First release: Area 51; November 1995
- Latest release: BlackSite: Area 51; November 12, 2007

Area 51 is a video game series set in Area 51 military facility. The franchise was launched by Atari Games as a series of two arcade light gun shooters in the 1990s, and was revisited by Midway Games as a series of first-person shooters in the 2000s. The original arcade games cast the player as a member of a special military unit that must battle an invasion of aliens called the Kronn. Versions of the original Area 51 were released for various home consoles. The Midway titles, exclusive to home systems, had different plots from the original games.

== Games ==
The original Area 51 was released in arcades in 1995, and ported in 1996 to the PlayStation, Sega Saturn and Windows. A sequel, Area 51: Site 4 was released by Atari in 1998. Unlike the original, it was not ported to any home consoles. Like all of Atari Games' products, it was absorbed into Midway Games' portfolio after Midway's shutdown of Atari Games in 2003.

Midway subsequently rebooted the franchise as a first-person shooter. In 2005, Area 51 was released by Midway for the PlayStation 2, Xbox and Microsoft Windows platforms. A sequel, BlackSite: Area 51 was released in 2007 for the PlayStation 3, Xbox 360 and Windows.

== Film ==
On August 31, 2004, Paramount Pictures announced that it had bought the world-wide film rights for the series. Billed as an action-packed thriller, producer Christine Peters was said to be collaborating with the game developers to help construct the film. On September 9, Variety reported that Paramount had hired Dean Georgaris to write the screenplay and produce with partner Micheal Aguilar. It was to be under their Penn Station banner along with Christine Peters and Midway; As of 2011, the status of the film's development was unknown.
