= Hangar One =

Hangar One or Hangar 1 may refer to:

- Hangar One (Mountain View, California) at Moffett Federal Airfield, California
- Hangar One (Los Angeles, California) at Los Angeles International Airport (LAX)
- Hangar 1 Vodka, a vodka made in Alameda, California
- Hangar No. 1, Lakehurst Naval Air Station, at US Naval Air Station Lakehurst, site of Hindenburg disaster
- Hangar 1: The UFO Files, television series

== See also ==
- Hangar (disambiguation)
