= Hangar 18 =

Hangar 18 may refer to:

- Hangar 18 (conspiracy theory), a conspiracy theory about a hangar at the Wright-Patterson Air Force Base in Ohio purported to contain UFO (Unidentified Flying Object) technology
- Hangar 18 (band), an American hip hop group
- Hangar 18 (film), a 1980 science fiction film
- "Hangar 18" (song), a song by Megadeth from Rust in Peace
- "Hangar 18, Area 51", a song by Yngwie Malmsteen from the 1999 album Alchemy
- Hangar 18, an Alienware HD media server
- Hangar 18, a DLC map for Call of Duty: Black Ops
- Hangar 18, a music venue in Swansea, Wales.

== See also ==
- Hangar (disambiguation)
- 18 (disambiguation)
- Area 51 (disambiguation)
