= Hanger =

Hanger or hangers may refer to:

== Hardware ==
- Clothes hanger, a device in the shape of human shoulders or legs used to hang clothes on
- Casing hanger, part of a wellhead assembly in oil drilling
- Derailleur hanger, a slot in a bicycle frame where the derailleur bolt attaches
- Tie (engineering), a type of structural member
- Hanger, part of a skateboard
- Hanger, a sword similar to a cutlass, used by woodsmen and soldiers in 17th to 18th centuries
- A hanger, a vertical cable or rod connecting the roadway of a suspension bridge to the bridge's main cable or arch

== People ==
- George Wallace William Hanger (1866–1935), American
- George Hanger, 4th Baron Coleraine (1750–1824), English author and soldier in the American Revolution
- Art Hanger (born 1943), Canadian politician
- Harry Hanger (1886–1918), English footballer
- James Edward Hanger (1843–1919), U.S. Civil War veteran and founder of:

- Hanger, Inc.

- Mostyn Hanger (1908–1980), judge, chief justice of Queensland, Australia, and administrator of Queensland
- Percy Hanger (1889–1939), English footballer

== Places ==
- Hanger Lane, a stretch of the North Circular Road in London, England
- Hanger River or Anger River, a river in west central Ethiopia
- Hangers Way, a 21-mile long-distance footpath through Hampshire, England

== Slang ==
- Hanger (barbershop music), a long note sung by one voice in a barbershop music song
- Monkey hanger, a British term for people from Hartlepool, England
- Hanger, or specky, a slang term for spectacular mark in Australian rules football
- Hangers, American slang for large, pendulous breasts

== Other uses ==
- Hanger (film) a 2009 horror film
- Hanger steak, a tender cut of steak
- Hanger, Inc., prosthetic and orthotic provider in the United States
- An old English word for a wooded slope from the Old English word hangra, preserved in English place names such as Hanger Lane

== See also ==
- Cliffhanger
- Hangar (disambiguation)
