= Taunton Municipal Airport =

Airport in Massachusetts, United States

Taunton Municipal Airport King Field
- IATA: none; ICAO: KTAN; FAA LID: TAN

Summary
- Airport type: Public
- Owner: City of Taunton
- Operator: Taunton Airport Commission
- Serves: Taunton, Massachusetts
- Elevation AMSL: 43 ft (13 m)
- Coordinates: 41°52′27″N 071°00′59″W
- Website: www.tauntonairport.com

Map
- Interactive map of Taunton Municipal Airport

Runways
Direction	Length		Surface
Direction	ft	m	Surface
12/30	3,500	1,067	Asphalt
4/22	1,900	579	Turf/gravel

Statistics (2009)
- Aircraft operations: 33,615
- Based aircraft: 111
- Source: Federal Aviation Administration

Taunton Municipal Airport (ICAO: KTAN, FAA LID: TAN), also known as King Field, is a public use airport located three nautical miles (6 km) east of the central business district of Taunton, a city in Bristol County, Massachusetts. It is located in the East Taunton neighborhood of the city. The city-owned airport is maintained and operated by the Taunton Airport Commission. According to the FAA's National Plan of Integrated Airport Systems for 2009–2013, it is categorized as a general aviation airport.

Although many U.S. airports use the same three-letter location identifier for the FAA and IATA, this airport is assigned TAN by the FAA and no designation from the IATA (which assigned TAN to Tangalooma Airport in Tangalooma, Queensland, Australia).

== History ==
The Taunton Municipal Airport was established in 1919 by Henry King, who was at that time a skilled pilot in the early years of aviation. He preserved and maintained the airport until 1960, when it was handed over to the city of Taunton. Some of the hangars still on the airport grounds, including the King Airfield Hangar, are registered with the National Register of Historic Places, since they date back to the earliest days of aviation.

== Facilities and aircraft ==
Taunton Municipal - King Field covers an area of 256 acres (104 ha) at an elevation of 43 feet (13 m) above mean sea level. It has two runways: 12/30 is 3,500 by 75 feet (1,067 x 23 m) with an asphalt pavement and 4/22 is 1,900 by 60 feet (579 x 18 m) with a turf and gravel surface. Available instrument approaches are non-precision.

The facility of the airport comprises an aircraft refueling area, designated aircraft and land vehicle parking areas, historic and private hangars, a small terminal (building), and a signal tower light.

For the 12-month period ending April 1, 2009, the airport had 33,615 aircraft operations, an average of 92 per day: 99.7% general aviation, 0.2% air taxi, and 0.1% military. At that time there were 111 aircraft based at this airport: 93.7% single-engine, 1.8% multi-engine and 4.5% helicopter.

== Commerce and industry ==
The airport plays a large role in the transport of goods from industries around the local region to outbound locations. Prominent businesses and corporations such as Ocean Spray and American Auto Auctions use the airport as a means of transporting goods and personnel. In January 2014, Pilgrim Aviation opened flight training operations at Taunton Municipal Airport at 2 Westcoat Drive, the location where Atlantic Aviation was formerly located. Pilgrim Aviation is a Cessna Pilot Center offering flight training, scenic flights, and plane rentals. Pilgrim Aviation is an FAA approved flight school under Part 61, and owns a fleet of 11 aircraft, including a 2013 Cessna 162 Skycatcher.

American Aero Services provides a full-service Maintenance Shop for General Aviation aircraft. They provide service to many types of Antique aircraft and seaplanes as well as Cessna, Piper and Beechcraft contemporary type aircraft.

Also, the airport provided flight training through Atlantic Aviation, which had a base of operations and various air services at the airport. Atlantic Aviation is a full service flight school, providing FAA approved flight training from certified instructors.

Various non-profit organizations and associations such as the Taunton Airport Association, the Brockton Flying Club, and the Civil Air Patrol.

== See also ==
- Bristol County (MA)
- Greater Taunton Area
- List of airports in Massachusetts
- Taunton, Massachusetts
