= Area 52 =

Area 52 may refer to:

- Tonopah Test Range, a military installation near Tonopah, Nevada
- Dugway Proving Ground, a military installation in Tooele County, Utah

== Fictional locations ==
=== Film and television ===
- Area 52, codename for Stargate Command in the Stargate Universe
- Area 52, a more secret government facility like Area 51 in the movie Looney Tunes: Back in Action
- Area 52, a secret government facility underneath Area 51 in the movie Zoom
- Area 52, the site just outside of Area 51 and the site of a Challenge Total Drama World Tour
- Area 52, pyramids in Egypt in the Doctor Who episode "The Wedding of River Song"
- Area 52, a secret government facility in the television show "Obliterated"
- Area 52, the primary setting for the British animated series Eddie Retractorhead

=== Video games ===
- Area 52, the setting of a multiplayer map in Perfect Dark
- Area 52, a Goblin town in the Netherstorm zone of World of Warcraft
- Area 52, the new Nazi headquarters near Roswell, New Mexico in Wolfenstein II: The New Colossus

== Other uses ==
- Area 52 (album), a 2012 album by Rodrigo y Gabriela and C.U.B.A.
- Brodmann area 52, an area of the brain
- Area52, a YouTube channel created by Chris Ramsay investigating UAP phenomena and anomalous experiences
- "Area 52", a song from the 2001 video game SimCity 4: Rush Hour
- "Area 52", a 2013 song by Yeah Yeah Yeahs from the album Mosquito
- "Area 52", a song from the 2003 animated movie Looney Tunes: Back in Action

== See also ==
- Area 51 (disambiguation)
