= Hangar, Iran =

Hangar هنگر
- Village
- Location within Iran
- Coordinates: 26°57′30″N 57°34′34″E
- Country: Iran
- Province: Hormozgan
- County: Minab
- Bakhsh: Senderk
- Rural District: Bondar

Population (2006)
  - Total: 85
- Time zone: UTC+3:30 (IRST)
  - Summer (DST): UTC+4:30 (IRDT)

Hangar (Persian: هنگر) is a village in Bondar Rural District, Senderk District, Minab County, Hormozgan Province, Iran. At the 2006 census, its population was 85, in 21 families.
