= King Airfield Hangar =

- U.S. National Register of Historic Places
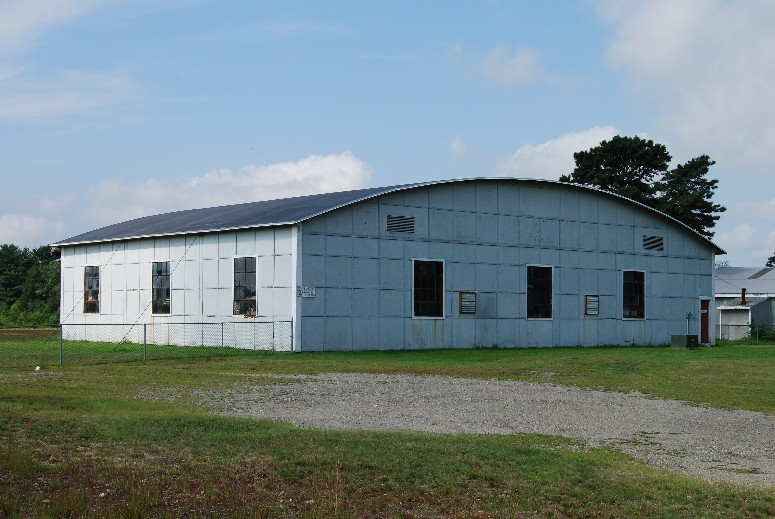

- Location within Massachusetts Location within the United States
- Location: Taunton, Massachusetts
- Coordinates: 41°52′51″N 71°1′14″W
- Built: 1919
- MPS: Taunton MRA
- NRHP reference No.: 84002141
- Added to NRHP: July 5, 1984

King Airfield Hangar is a historic airplane hangar on Middleboro Avenue in Taunton, Massachusetts on private property near the Taunton Municipal Airport. It is a wood-frame structure, roughly 80 by 80 feet (24 m × 24 m), with a curved corrugated metal roof.

The hangar was built in 1919 as part of "King's Field", one of the first private airports in New England, and is its oldest surviving remnant. The airfield was built by Henry King on his dairy farm. King and his family established a flying school with the purchase of a Curtiss Jenny World War I surplus airplane. The Kings also offered sightseeing tours over the Taunton area.

In the 1940s and 50s the family acquired a small fleet of aircraft and operated an air taxi service. Local businesses also hangared their planes at the airfield. In 1959, the main runway was paved and improved to 3,400 feet. Despite lack of obvious necessity, the airfield was taken in the 1960s from the King family by eminent domain by the city and renamed Taunton Municipal Airport. The small portion of the original farm where the 1919 hangar is located was not part of the eminent domain.

The historic hangar was added to the National Register of Historic Places in 1984.

== See also ==
- National Register of Historic Places listings in Taunton, Massachusetts
