= Area 51: Site 4 =

1998 video game

- Arcade flyer
- Developer: Atari Games/Mesa Logic
- Publisher: Atari Games
- Series: Area 51
- Platform: Arcade
- Release: NA: 1998; EU: 1999
- Genre: Light gun shooter
- Arcade system: Atari Media GX hardware

Area 51: Site 4 is a 1998 light-gun shooter video game developed by Mesa Logic and published by Atari Games for arcades. It is a sequel to the original Area 51 (1995), picking up where that game left off. Though the graphics have been improved, they rely on the same full-motion video technology as the original, and the gameplay remains largely the same as the original game.

== Gameplay ==
The game is divided into two sections, "Field Exercises" and "Beyond Area 51," and the player may choose which one to play first. Field Exercises allows the player to choose one of three levels (Sites 1, 2, and 3), ranked by difficulty and each consisting of six missions that may be played in any order. Every mission requires the player to meet a stated objective, such as shooting a set number of attacking zombies or aliens, destroying missiles before they can reach Earth, or stopping aliens from overturning a bus. One life is lost whenever the player fails a mission, and the success threshold is set lower for the next attempt; if all lives are lost, the game ends. The player earns a score bonus for completing all six missions at a site, and can earn special weapons or unlock secret areas by shooting certain objects in the background.

Beyond Area 51 sends the player to Site 4, in a mission resembling gameplay of the original Area 51. Special weapons earned in the Field Exercises can be used during this portion of the game, in which the player enters a vast warehouse infested by aliens. The final boss is a giant alien queen with multiple limbs, who must be destroyed within a time limit. The game ends when the player either runs out of lives due to shooting S.T.A.A.R. agents or being hit by enemy attacks, or runs out of time without destroying the queen.

After the game is beaten, a short sequence of clips is played involving S.T.A.A.R. members, ending with the message, "S.T.A.A.R. Wants You!" similar to the real-world Uncle Sam army recruitment posters. The intro is only seen in attract mode as an intro loop. The end credits can only be seen after playing without entering initials.

== Reception ==
The Atari Times gave the game a positive review, stating "I cannot tell you enough that this game is very good. I mean, it has great graphics, it has OK sound, amazing control and incredible gameplay. I mean, what more could you ask for in an arcade shooter?"
