= Hangares metro station =

Mexico City Metro station

Hangares
- Station sign, 2026

General information
- Location: Fuerza Aérea Mexicana Avenue; Venustiano Carranza, Mexico City; Mexico
- Coordinates: 19°25′27″N 99°05′15″W
- System: Mexico City Metro
- Owner: Government of Mexico City
- Operator: Sistema de Transporte Colectivo (STC)
- Platforms: 2 side platforms
- Tracks: 2
- Connections: Route: 11-C

Construction
- Structure type: Underground
- Depth: 20 m (66 ft)

Other information
- Status: In service

History
- Opened: 19 December 1981; 44 years ago

Key dates
- 23 April 2020; 6 years ago: Temporarily closed
- 15 June 2020; 6 years ago: Reopened

Passengers
- 2025: 1,605,965 (Note: The system's website counts only passenger entries into stations and does not include passengers passing through, transferring between lines, or exiting the station. The data here is limited to the most recent ten years to avoid excessive listings; earlier figures can be found in this page's history or on the Mexico City Metro website. To calculate the average daily ridership, the annual total is divided by 365 days (366 in leap years), with decimals omitted from the result. Each station per line is ranked individually, as the system counts transfer stations separately. The percentage change is calculated automatically using the data from the current year and the previous year.) ▼0.01%
- Rank: 183/195

Services
| Preceding station | Mexico City Metro | Following station |
|---|---|---|
| Terminal Aérea toward Politécnico | Line 5 | Pantitlán Terminus |
Route map
Location
- Location within Mexico City
- Area map and exits

Hangares metro station (Note: Estación del Metro Hangares. Spanish pronunciation: [aŋˈɡaɾes]. The name of the station literally means "Hangars" in Spanish.) is a station on the Mexico City Metro in the city's borough of Venustiano Carranza. It is an underground station with two side platforms serving Line 5 (Yellow Line), located between Terminal Aérea and Pantitlán stations. It opened on 19 December 1981, providing service northwest toward Consulado station and east toward Pantitlán station.

The station services the colonia of Federal, along Avenida Fuerza Aérea Mexicana, located next to Mexico City International Airport. The station's pictogram features a biplane inside a hangar, reflecting its proximity to the airport's hangars.

In 2025, the station had an average daily ridership of 4,399 passenger entries, ranking it the 183rd busiest station in the network and making it one of its least-used stations.

== Location and layout ==
The station's platforms

Hangares is an underground metro station located on Avenida Fuerza Aérea Mexicana in Venustiano Carranza, Mexico City. It serves the colonia (neighborhood) of Federal.

Hangares metro station has two exits serving Colonia Federal. The northern exit is located on Avenida Fuerza Aérea Mexicana, while the southern exit is at the corner of Calle Correos y Telégrafos and Calle Asistencia Pública.

Hangares metro station is located between Terminal Aérea and Pantitlán on the line. The station was serviced by the AICM shuttle bus service, operated by TETSA, which ran between Terminals 1 and 2. Also, Route 11-C of the city's public bus system services the area.

Near the station, a pedestrian bridge known as "MacPuente" is used as an informal observation deck where people gather to watch airplanes land and take off.

== History and construction ==
Southern entrance along Fuerza Aérea Mexicana Avenue, 2026

Line 5 of the Mexico City Metro was built by Cometro, a subsidiary of Empresas ICA. Its first section, which includes Hangares station, opened on 19 December 1981, running from Pantitlán to Consulado stations.

The tunnel between Hangares and Terminal Aérea stations was constructed using slurry walls built with the Milan method. It is 1,153 meters (3,783 ft) long. The section in the opposite direction, toward Pantitlán, ascends from the underground level to grade level and is 1,644 meters (5,394 ft) long.

=== Name and pictogram ===
Hangares metro station's pictogram depicts a biplane inside a hangar symbolizing its proximity to the hangars of the Mexico City International Airport (AICM).

=== Incidents ===
After the 2015 Oceanía metro station train crash, Hangares metro station was temporarily closed for repairs. From 1 to 16 March 2020, Terminal Aérea, Hangares, and Pantitlán stations were closed due to a gasoline leak at a nearby gas station. Additionally, from 23 April to 15 June 2020, Hangares metro station was temporarily closed due to the COVID-19 pandemic in Mexico.

Unlike other key metro stations that were renovated to accommodate the expected tourist demand ahead of the 2026 FIFA World Cup, Hangares metro station did not undergo any major renovations. La Jornada reported in March 2026 that the station had damp walls, saltpeter buildup on the ceilings, a grated drain with leaks, rusted metal structures, sheets and wires used to cover leaks, nonfunctional lamps, water stains, and no clocks on the platforms. The water-related issues worsen during the rainy season. In the same year, a guide rail expanded in the section leading to Terminal Aérea station, reportedly because of heat, causing a partial closure for most of the day on 7 May.

== Ridership ==
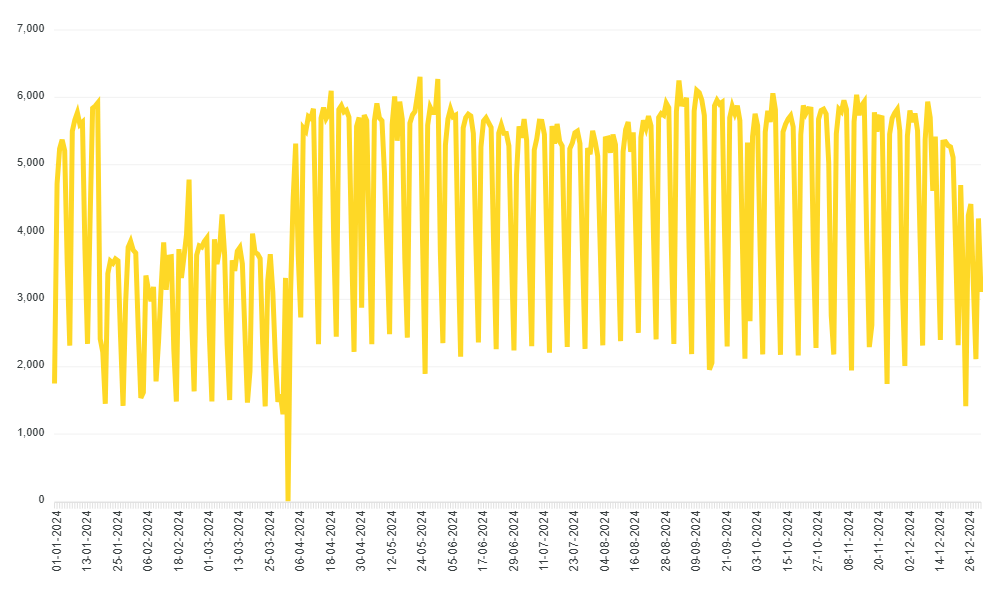
Daily ridership for Hangares station in 2024

According to official data, excepting the years the COVID-19 pandemic impacted public transportation, Hangares metro station recorded between 4,000 and 5,300 average daily entries from 2016 to 2025. In 2025, it recorded 1,605,965 passenger entries, ranking 183rd among the system's 195 stations.

Annual passenger ridership
| Year | Ridership | Average daily | Rank | % change | Ref. |
|---|---|---|---|---|---|
| 2025 | 1,605,965 | 4,399 | 183/195 | −0.01% | |
| 2024 | 1,606,130 | 4,388 | 176/195 | −16.68% | |
| 2023 | 1,927,653 | 5,281 | 157/195 | +29.34% | |
| 2022 | 1,490,365 | 4,083 | 168/195 | +57.38% | |
| 2021 | 946,994 | 2,594 | 179/195 | +22.31% | |
| 2020 | 777,118 | 2,123 | 191/195 | −56.32% | |
| 2019 | 1,772,609 | 4,856 | 188/195 | −6.42% | |
| 2018 | 1,894,220 | 5,189 | 186/195 | +2.37% | |
| 2017 | 1,850,363 | 5,069 | 186/195 | +2.56% | |
| 2016 | 1,804,140 | 4,929 | 186/195 | −3.91% | |
