= Midway Studios Austin =

Former video game studio

Midway Austin
- Logo from 2004 to 2008
- Company type: Subsidiary
- Industry: Video games
- Founded: 2000; 26 years ago
- Defunct: August 11, 2008
- Successors: Aspyr; Retro Studios; Certain Affinity; Vigil Games; Arkane Austin
- Headquarters: Austin, Texas, U.S.
- Products: Area 51 series
- Parent: Midway Games (2004–2008)

Midway Studios Austin (formerly known as Inevitable Entertainment) was a video game developer established by former Acclaim Studios Austin employees, founded as Inevitable Entertainment in 2000 and acquired by Midway Games in 2004. Responsible for developing Area 51 and its 2007 sequel BlackSite: Area 51.

On August 11, 2008, Midway announced it was canceling the game in development at its Austin location and was laying off between 90 and 130 of the Austin employees. In December 2008, the studio closed its doors, laying off the entire local workforce as part of a larger, company-wide, action. Many of its former staff members have since left to other companies such as Aspyr, Retro Studios, Certain Affinity, and the now-defunct Vigil Games and Arkane Austin.

== Games ==
- Tribes: Aerial Assault (2002)
- The Hobbit (2003)
- Area 51 (2005)
- BlackSite: Area 51 (2007)
