= Hangar-e Pain =

Hangar-e Pain هنگرپائين
- Village
- Location within Iran
- Coordinates: 30°53′29″N 56°41′47″E
- Country: Iran
- Province: Kerman
- County: Zarand
- Bakhsh: Central
- Rural District: Hotkan

Population (2006)
  - Total: 8
- Time zone: UTC+3:30 (IRST)
  - Summer (DST): UTC+4:30 (IRDT)

Hangar-e Pain (Persian: هنگرپائين, also Romanized as Hangar-e Pā’īn; also known as Hangar-e Mīān) is a village in Hotkan Rural District, in the Central District of Zarand County, Kerman Province, Iran. At the 2006 census, its population was eight, in four families.
