= Area 51 (2005 video game) =

- North American cover art
- Developer: Midway Studios Austin
- Publisher: Midway
- Producers: Zach Wood; Daryl Allison
- Designer: James Stiefelmaier
- Artists: Peter Franco; Mookie Weisbrod
- Composer: Chris Vrenna
- Series: Area 51
- Platforms: PlayStation 2, Xbox, Windows
- Release: PlayStation 2, Xbox: NA: April 25, 2005; AU: May 26, 2005; EU: May 27, 2005; Windows: NA: June 8, 2005; EU: July 1, 2005
- Genre: First-person shooter
- Modes: Single-player, multiplayer

Area 51 (stylized as Area-51) is a 2005 first-person shooter video game developed by Midway Studios Austin and published by Midway for the PlayStation 2, Xbox, and Windows. A GameCube version was also in development, but was canceled. It is a loose remake of the 1995 arcade game of the same name, and was followed in 2007 by the loosely related BlackSite: Area 51. The player controls Ethan Cole, a HAZMAT operative sent to the Area 51 base to assist in the cleanup of a mutagenic virus.

Notable among the voice actors are David Duchovny as Ethan Cole, Marilyn Manson as Edgar the ancient and powerful Grey, Powers Boothe as Major Bridges, Nolan North as McCan, and Ian Abercrombie as Dr. Winston Cray.

== Gameplay ==
Area 51 is a first-person shooter, played from the perspective of the protagonist, Ethan Cole. The game features operable machinery, including artillery turrets, besides the player's inventory of weapons.

Throughout the game, the player uses a variety of weapons, both human and alien in origin, to defeat their adversaries. Most weapons can only be wielded one handed, however the player can dual wield some weapons, such as the Shotgun and the Sub-Machine Gun. Each weapon can also be used as a melee weapon for close quarter combat. Each weapon has two modes of firing, the first being the primary method, while the second is of a much higher power level, at the cost of ammunition and accuracy to the player. The player can also use explosive grenades.

Midway through the game, Ethan Cole becomes infected with the mutagen, and the option to turn into a mutant temporarily is obtained. Mutating offers a variety of benefits, such as increased strength, stamina, as well as the initial ability to fire health-replenishing parasites as well as the later ability to contaminate enemies, both at the cost of mutation time reduction. While in a mutant form, players can easily spot enemies, which would otherwise be cloaked to the regular human eye, albeit with a slight ocular defect.

Players can replenish health and mutagen either through the use of medical syringes found throughout the game or by using parasites, and mutagen by melee combat or "using" infected corpses, or by finding mutagen syringes.

A notable aspect of gameplay is the ability to scan and analyze various objects in the game environment. This is possible by using the scanner present on the player's suit, worn throughout the game. While using a scanner, the player has no access to weapons, and must switch to an available weapon in order to fight (though they could still melee). Scanning provides detailed information on a player's surroundings, as well as combated enemies.

The scanner, when equipped, adds a translucent bar to the player's HUD, which changes in color and height from light blue, to deep red. This bar indicates how near or far a player is, to one of many scannable clues, such as file folders or personal digital assistants. The scanner can collect information from the items without it being touched. The HUD shows red when the player is very close, and blue when very far. Items which are scanned are viewable in-game, providing insight into the workings of Area 51, as well as proving necessary to unlocking secret videos made by Dr. Cray or Mr. White.

Area 51 also supports online multiplayer. While Xbox Live for the original Xbox was shut down in 2010, Area 51 is now playable online using replacement online servers for the Xbox called Insignia.

== Plot ==
In July 1947, an alien spacecraft crashed near Roswell, New Mexico in the United States. The craft was recovered by the U.S. Air Force and taken to Area 51 in Nevada, where the lone survivor of the crash, a powerful Grey named Edgar (Marilyn Manson), was held captive by the U.S. military. Eventually, the Greys opened a dialogue with the Illuminati led by the ominous Mr. White (Phil Proctor), and struck a deal with them. The Illuminati would give the Greys a research base 3 miles below the surface of Area 51, the use of the base as a landing site, and give them human test subjects where they, along with human scientists, would research a mutagenic virus to use in a war on their homeworld. In return the Greys would give the Illuminati exclusive access to Grey technology. The Illuminati used some of this technology to spy on the population.

The Greys and the human scientists eventually developed a powerful alien being - known as the "Theta", which spread the virus. Unbeknownst to many of the scientists working on the project, the Greys and the Illuminati were also planning to use the virus against the Earth population and dominate the planet. When Dr. Winston Cray (Ian Abercrombie) found out about the plan, he let loose the "Theta" and the mutagenic virus throughout Area 51, in an effort to slow them down. This prompted the military to send in a Quick Reaction Force led by Major Bridges (Powers Boothe) to quarantine and contain the virus. HAZMAT Team Delta, the first team initially sent into Area 51 are ambushed by the "Theta" creature, sustaining casualties, before withdrawing deeper into the base. HAZMAT Team Bravo, composed of team leader Ramirez, McCan, Crispy, and mission specialist Ethan Cole (David Duchovny) is sent to find Delta.

After initially encountering the mutants, McCan is killed when a mutant decapitates him. Deeper into the base, Crispy and Ramirez are both ambushed by the Theta and killed, leaving Cole on his own. Cole manages to locate the rest of Delta, however they are attacked again by the Theta, and all but Cole and Lieutenant Chew are killed. Making their way topside, the Illuminati disables the cargo elevator, killing Chew and leaving Cole bitten by one mutant, partially mutating him. Able to switch between human and mutant form, Cole is guided deeper into the base by Edgar reanimating corpses to deliver information telepathically. Cole is guided to Dr. Cray's bio labs, where Cray claims there is time to decontaminate Cole, and rid him of the virus. Before he can be cured, the Illuminati attack, killing Cray and stopping the process.

Cole proceeds deeper underground into a cave system, where he eventually gets reacquainted with the Theta. He manages to kill the creature, avenging both his team and HazTeam Delta. He meets Edgar miles beneath the surface who reveals the scientists used his DNA to create the virus, and the nature of the experiments at the base, which killed dozens of his species to harvest it. He then tells Cole the history of the Greys and Area 51. Edgar gives Cole the cure to the mutagenic virus, and instructs him to destroy the Grey's ship, that is leaving with dozens of Theta duplicates. Cole locates the vessel and destroys it by overloading its reactor, and uses a teleporter to escape into the Nevada desert. He lands by the "White Mailbox" area and watches Area 51 being destroyed by the exploding ship in a tornado like explosion. Cole watches as a truck drives past, with a green, alien-like container on board with unknown contents inside and walks away from the site. He reflects upon his original purpose at Area 51 and recognizes that while he and Hazmat Team Bravo had failed, their sacrifices may have saved mankind.

== Reception ==
Reception

Aggregate score
Aggregator	Score		
Aggregator	PC	PS2	Xbox
Metacritic	67/100	75/100	72/100

Review scores
Publication	Score		
Publication	PC	PS2	Xbox
Edge	6/10	6/10	6/10
Electronic Gaming Monthly	N/A	8/10	8/10
Eurogamer	N/A	8/10	N/A
Game Informer	N/A	8.5/10	8.5/10
GamePro	N/A	4.5/5	N/A
GameRevolution	N/A	C+	C+
GameSpot	6.9/10	7.2/10	7.2/10
GameSpy	3/5	N/A	3/5
GameTrailers	N/A	7.3/10	7.3/10
GameZone	7.5/10	8.5/10	8.2/10
IGN	7.5/10	8.5/10	8/10
Official U.S. PlayStation Magazine	N/A	4/5	N/A
Official Xbox Magazine (US)	N/A	N/A	6.8/10
PC Gamer (US)	73%	N/A	N/A
Maxim	6/10	N/A	N/A
The Sydney Morning Herald	N/A	2.5/5	3/5

The PlayStation 2 version received "generally favorable reviews", while the PC and Xbox versions received "average reviews", according to video game review aggregator website Metacritic. GamePro Germany gave the game 80 out of 100 on both consoles, praising the graphics controls and effects but criticizing it for the enemy AI and very little weapons.

== Film ==
In 2004, ahead of the game's release, Paramount Pictures announced that they had reached an agreement concerning the film rights for the game. In March 2007, comic book author Grant Morrison was hired to adapt the game as a screenplay. Morrison's screenplay has been in limbo since at least March 21, 2012, with Graeme McMillan of ComicsAlliance calling the film a "never-happened film project". This project is unrelated to the movie Area 51 by Oren Peli.

== Trivia ==
- A playable game demo was included in Mortal Kombat: Deception.
- In 2012, the game was sponsored and released as freeware by the United States Air Force.
