= BlackSite: Area 51 =

2007 video game

- Developer: Midway Studios Austin
- Publisher: Midway Games
- Designer: Harvey Smith
- Composer: Jason Graves
- Series: Area 51
- Engine: Unreal Engine 3
- Platforms: Windows; Xbox 360; PlayStation 3
- Release: Windows, Xbox 360: NA: November 12, 2007; AU: November 29, 2007; EU: November 30, 2007; PlayStation 3: NA: December 10, 2007; AU: March 6, 2008; EU: March 7, 2008
- Genre: First-person shooter
- Modes: Single-player, multiplayer

BlackSite: Area 51 (released in Europe and Australia as BlackSite) is a first-person shooter video game, released for Xbox 360 and Microsoft Windows on November 12, 2007 in North America, and PlayStation 3 on December 10, 2007. The game is mostly unrelated to the 2005 multi-platform game Area 51. The game was developed by Midway Studios Austin and published by Midway Games.

== Gameplay ==
BlackSite: Area 51 features first-person shooter gameplay. It uses a regenerating health system; additionally the player's character can absorb relatively large amounts of gunfire before dying. The game features six different weapons, though only two can be carried at the same time. The game also features the ability to use grenades and melee attacks. The game's main weapon, the M4 carbine, has a holographic sight that can be aimed through for zooming in on distant targets.

One of the main features of the game is squad tactics. For almost the entire game, the player will have a team of two A.I. controlled squadmates accompanying them. Squadmates can be ordered to move on a location, concentrate their fire on a specific enemy, man a mounted turret, or set explosive charges on certain items. Squad commands are given with a single button; the commands are context sensitive based on what the player points the cursor at. Squadmates cannot be killed, and will only be knocked out for a brief period after taking a certain amount of damage. The game also features a morale system, where squad morale increases as the player kills enemies or scores headshots, and decreases as the player takes damage or as squadmates are injured or incapacitated. At high morale, squadmates fight much more effectively and can survive more damage, while at low morale they contribute much less to firefights, and are incapacitated much more easily.

The game also features several vehicle sections, where the player must drive a civilian van or military Humvee cross-country to reach a location, while dealing with enemy attacks. The player can exit the vehicle at any time to collect items, investigate buildings, or man the Humvee's mounted machine gun.

The multiplayer features modes such as Deathmatch, Team Deathmatch, Capture the flag, Siege, and Human VS. Reborn. The Siege and Human VS. Reborn are different and unique from other games. It allows the teams to attempt to control each of the level's territories while trying to capture one another. The Deathmatch mode, as well as the rest of the online portion of the game has a maximum number of 10 players. There is no local multiplayer.

== Plot ==
Captain Aeran Pierce and the rest of his Delta Force Echo Squad are sent to investigate a supposed weapons bunker in Iraq in 2003. They are accompanied by the head of an elite science team, Doctor Noa Weis. After battling through the Iraqi Army, they find the bunker is infested with mutated humans and wildlife (referred to collectively as Xenos) created by an alien crystal found in the bunker. This crystal incapacitates Pierce and forces the squad to retreat. One member of the squad, Lieutenant Logan Somers, is left behind during the retreat.

Three years later, a heavily armed militia has taken control of Area 51 and the surrounding area, accompanied by an outbreak of alien creatures identical to those encountered in Iraq. Echo Squad and Doctor Weis have been chosen to reclaim the base. They begin with the nearby town of Rachel, where they discover that the "militia" are actually cybernetically enhanced American soldiers known as Reborn. Echo Squad finds survivors in Rachel, but as they rescue the survivors, they find Lieutenant Somers, now a Reborn. Somers explains that the Reborn program was designed to replace the volunteer army of U.S. citizens with expendable supersoldiers, using subjects forcibly recruited from groups of people who could disappear without being noticed, such as the homeless, illegal immigrants, and military without family. Because of the harsh experiments, one of them led an insurrection.

Back at base, they find out that Weis was in charge of the Reborn program, but it was shut down years ago and the soldiers sealed in Area 51. Somers led the Reborn to escape and seek revenge, using an alien device of which the crystal in Iraq was a stolen component. After being revealed as the Reborn leader, Somers betrays Echo Squad and retreats back to Area 51 as the Xenos and Reborn attack the base. Echo Squad successfully repels the attack, then joins another military division in an assault on Area 51. During the assault, Pierce is captured and the rest of Echo Squad is killed.

Inside Area 51, Pierce discovers that the Xenos were actually created by spores emitted by the alien device, and that Somers is using the device to spread the spores across the surface of Earth. Pierce escapes with the assistance of Dr. Weis, then shuts down the device and kills Somers in a shootout. The game ends with Pierce and Weis flying off in a helicopter to assess the damage caused by the Xeno spores.

== Development ==
The game uses Midway's modified Unreal Engine 3. This allows for more realistic graphics and effects, such as having rain bounce off the player's weapon. Many destructible objects are featured, but most of the environment is not alterable. On May 11, 2007, a demo for the Xbox 360 was released on the Xbox Live Marketplace. A second demo was released onto Xbox Live Marketplace, a week after the game's release. The game was in development for two years.

== Reception ==
Reception

Aggregate score
Aggregator	Score		
Aggregator	PC	PS3	Xbox 360
Metacritic	60/100	56/100	62/100

Review scores
Publication	Score		
Publication	PC	PS3	Xbox 360
Edge	4/10	4/10	4/10
Electronic Gaming Monthly	N/A	N/A	5.67/10
Eurogamer	N/A	N/A	5/10
Game Informer	7.5/10	7.5/10	7.5/10
GamePro	N/A	N/A	4/5
GameRevolution	N/A	N/A	D
GameSpot	6.5/10	N/A	6.5/10
GameSpy	N/A	N/A	2.5/5
GameTrailers	5.4/10	5.4/10	5.4/10
GameZone	N/A	N/A	6.5/10
IGN	6.5/10	6.2/10	(US) 6.4/10 (AU) 5.4/10
Official Xbox Magazine (US)	N/A	N/A	6/10
PC Gamer (US)	56%	N/A	N/A
PlayStation: The Official Magazine	N/A	3/5	N/A
411Mania	N/A	N/A	5.9/10

The game received mixed or average reviews on all platforms according to video game review aggregator website Metacritic.

On November 29, 2007, Harvey Smith, the game's designer, came out publicly to announce how ruined the game's development schedule was. He claimed the schedule caused the low reviews due to the fact they were not able to test the game properly. He lost his job at Midway soon after making this comment.
