= The Pinball of the Dead =

2002 video game

- Developer: Wow Entertainment
- Publisher: Sega: NA: THQ
- Director: Yuichi Toyama
- Producer: Rikiya Nakagawa
- Composers: Tetsuya Kawauchi; Haruyoshi Tomita
- Series: The House of the Dead
- Platform: Game Boy Advance
- Release: NA: June 18, 2002; JP: July 4, 2002; EU: January 10, 2003
- Genre: Pinball
- Mode: Single-player

The Pinball of the Dead is a pinball video game developed by Sega's Wow Entertainment division and published by Sega. It was released for the Game Boy Advance in 2002 and 2003. Based on Sega's The House of the Dead series of light gun games, particularly The House of the Dead and The House of the Dead 2, the game contains three tables and includes a "Challenge" mode. Full-motion video sequences and audio samples from previous games were also added. The game was first announced during the 2001 Nintendo Space World. Composer Hitoshi Sakimoto was involved with making the game's music.

The Pinball of the Dead received generally positive reviews from video game critics, receiving an Editor's Choice award on GameZone. Critics praised the graphics and sound while its gameplay physics was more mixed. It also received several comparisons to other pinball games like Devil's Crush. In 2005, the game was later called one of the best games of all time from gaming magazine Nintendo Power.

== Gameplay ==
Gameplay of the Cemetery table in Pinball of the Dead. Shows a zombie killed by the ball.

The Pinball of the Dead is a pinball video game. The game has three tables based on locations from The House of the Dead and The House of the Dead 2: Wondering, Movement, and Cemetery. The player launches the ball into the table via the "Skill Shot", where a crosshair moves onto a zombie and bonus points can be earned by successfully hitting a zombie. Each table has zombies moving around that the player must kill to score points. Scoring enough points unlock new areas and eventual boss battles. Hitting certain objects or characters spell out words such as "Escape" or "Chaos". These words can result in obtaining extra balls or unlocking special events.

There are six bosses in the game, based on House of the Dead 2 bosses. Losing a boss battle results in being sent back to the main board, where the player must regain access to the boss. The game also features a "Challenge" mode, increasing the game's difficulty. Full-motion video sequences and audio samples from previous entries in the series appear in the game.

== Development ==
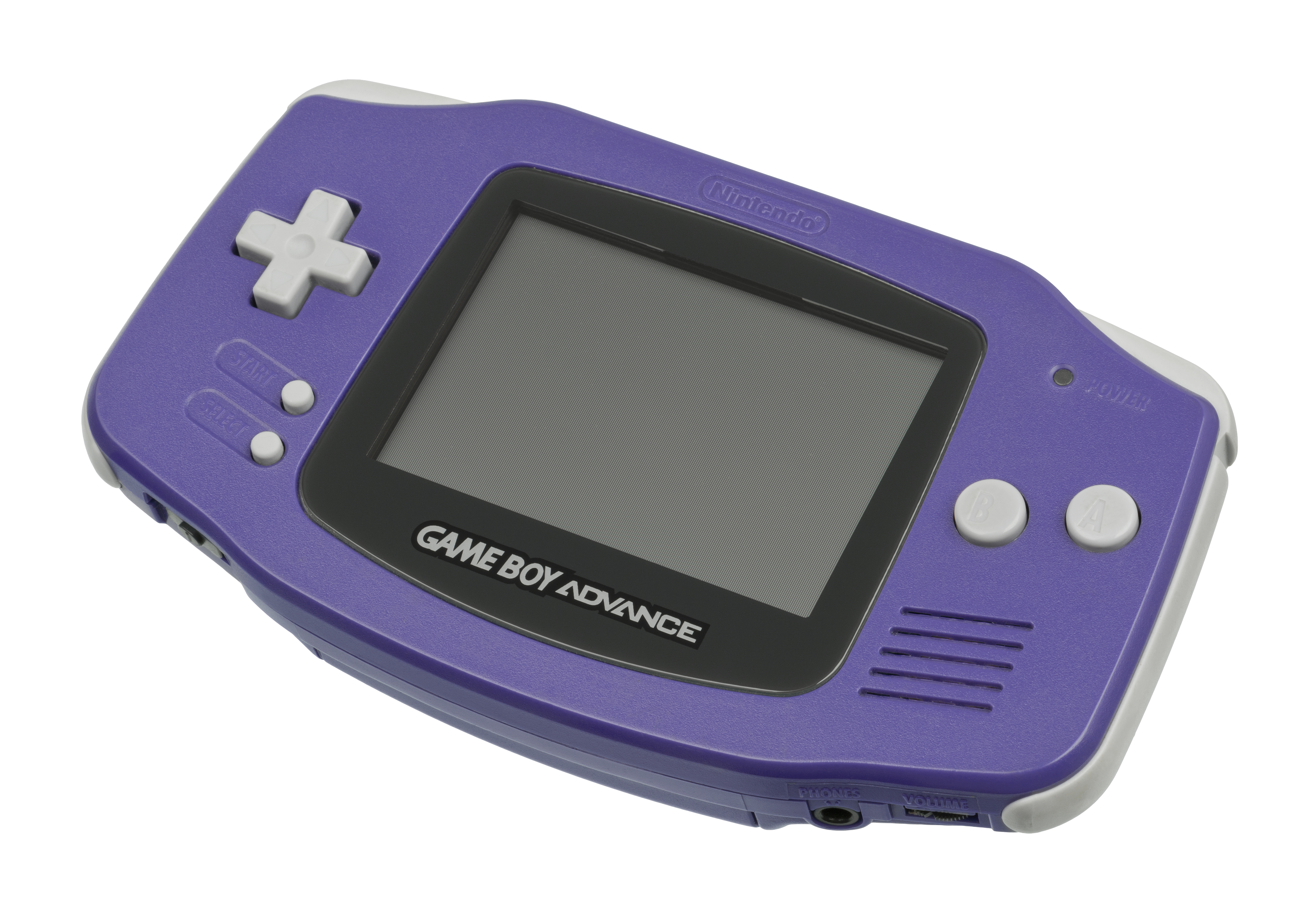
The Pinball of the Dead was developed for Nintendo's Game Boy Advance.

The game was developed by Sega's Wow Entertainment division. The Pinball of the Dead was first announced as House of the Dead Pinball in an interview with Rikiya Nakagawa, the CEO of Wow Entertainment, at the 2001 Nintendo Space World. Sega later announced that the game would be co-published by North American video game company THQ as part of a joint agreement to publish and develop games for the Game Boy Advance. Composer Hitoshi Sakimoto was involved with the game's music. It was shown as part of THQ's E3 2002 booth. Pinball of the Dead was released in North America on June 18, 2002, and later on July 4, 2002, in Japan.

== Reception ==
Reception

Aggregate score
| Aggregator | Score |
|---|---|
| Metacritic | 79/100 |

Review scores
| Publication | Score |
|---|---|
| AllGame | 2.5/5 |
| Electronic Gaming Monthly | 7/10, 6/10, 7/10 |
| Famitsu | 8/10, 8/10, 7/10, 8/10 |
| Game Informer | 9/10 |
| GamePro | 4.5/5 |
| GameSpot | 8/10 |
| GameSpy | 3/5 |
| GameZone | 9/10 |
| IGN | 8/10 |
| Nintendo Power | 4/5 |

Previewing the game at the Tokyo Game Show, GameSpot's Jeff Gerstmann spoke positively of the game's animation while criticizing the ball physics and the strength of the flippers. Upon release of the game, The Pinball of the Dead received "generally favorable reviews" according to the review aggregation website Metacritic. Critics compared the game favorably to Devil's Crush, Alien Crush, and Kirby's Pinball Land. The game was selected as the "Editor's Choice" by GameZone. It was a runner-up for GameSpot's annual "Best Sound on Game Boy Advance" award, which went to Aggressive Inline.

A writer for GamePro called the game's graphics "clean, detailed, and animated with flashing unlife", while being unimpressed by the bosses. Suzanne Ashe from GameSpy also called the graphics "terrific" in spite of the limitations on the Game Boy Advance. IGN's Craig Harris noted slowdown in the graphics when multiple objects move on-screen. Reviewing for GameSpot, Greg Kasavin, also noted the slowdown in the game and mentioned it throws off the timing in making shots. The sound and music to the game were also well received. Harris considered the sound effects to be a mixed bag, however.

The gameplay physics received mixed reactions. One writer from GameZone described the ball physics as "accurate" while the GamePro writer thought it to be "spot-on". Both Craig Harris and Greg Kasavin thought the physics to be "floaty". Harris and AllGame's Scott Alan Marriott recommended Muppets Pinball Mayhem over Pinball of the Dead, with Harris saying it had more realism in its physics and Marriott saying it was made engaging and there were more things to do in it.

"Arguably, The Pinball of the Dead is the best idea since sliced bread. Or at least since 2001's absurdly fun The Typing of the Dead."

— Greg Kasavin, GameSpot

Writing about spin-off games, Justin Towell from GamesRadar called it "a solid and fun pinball game". In 2005, the game was later ranked #137 on Nintendo Power's list of the top 200 best games of all time. It was also listed as one of the best games for the Game Boy Advance by Den of Geek.
