= The House of the Dead 4 =

2005 video game

- Developers: Sega AM1; Sega Shanghai Studio (PS3)
- Publisher: Sega
- Director: Takashi Oda
- Producer: Yasuhiro Nishiyama
- Composers: Susumu Tsukagoshi; Makito Nomiya
- Series: The House of the Dead
- Platforms: Arcade; PlayStation 3
- Release: Arcade: JP: July 2, 2005 (location test); JP: December 30, 2005 (nationwide); NA: 2006; PAL: 2006; PlayStation 3 (PSN): NA: April 17, 2012; EU: April 18, 2012; JP: April 19, 2012
- Genres: Rail shooter, light gun shooter, horror game
- Modes: Single-player, multiplayer
- Arcade system: Sega Lindbergh

The House of the Dead 4 (Note: Japanese: ザ・ハウス・オブ・ザ・デッド4, Hepburn: Za Hausu obu za Deddo Fō) is a light gun shooter arcade game developed by Wow Entertainment and published by Sega. and the fourth installment of the House of the Dead video game series, developed by Sega. The game takes place between the events of The House of the Dead 2 and The House of the Dead III, and introduced several new gameplay concepts. Players can control characters James Taylor, from The House of the Dead 2 (on the left side), or Kate Green, a new character to the series (on the right side). The game was followed by House of the Dead: Scarlet Dawn.

The game was adapted into a ride attraction, The House of the Dead 4 Special. A PlayStation 3 version featuring support for PlayStation Move and the two stages from The House of the Dead 4 Special was released on April 17, 2012, on the PlayStation Network.

== Gameplay ==
Player characters are equipped with submachine guns in this game, as opposed to semiautomatic pistols in the first two or shotguns in the third. The gun will fire in fully automatic mode as long as the trigger is depressed, and can be reloaded by shaking it or pointing away from the screen. Players can also find and throw grenades to destroy large numbers of enemies at once. Additional grenades can be earned by completing certain tasks or by shooting crates. At some points in the game, players are required to shake the gun vigorously in order to escape certain situations.

The game features branching paths. Most of the paths lead to the same point in the game's story. As with The House of the Dead III, there is an end-of-stage bonus where players can receive extra lives depending on headshot level combo, accuracy, and score. Another returning factor is the presence of the "Cancel" bar.

The game runs on a critical shots counter where the player is encouraged to shoot the enemy's weak points rather than spraying ammo at the enemy. It starts off as Good, Excellent, Amazing and then Perfect. Getting hit, or killing an enemy not by the weak point resets the counter.

The most common enemies have three attacks: a "normal attack", a "grab," and a "push". The foremost inflicts one point of damage, while the second forces a shaking sequence that, if successful, pushes back attackers for easier disposal, but if unsuccessful, will result in the player being bitten or the player's character being knocked down and vulnerable. Multiple zombies may also pile on top of both players in an attempt to stomp on them (or kick them while they're down).

The bonus-life system departs from the previous games, where life is gained by saving hostages; the loss of these events are substituted with an increase of extra-life pickups in the environment.

== Plot ==
In 2003, three years after the Caleb Goldman case, the events still haunt veteran American AMS agent James Taylor, who believes the ordeal hasn't ended. He returns to Europe, accompanied by a new rookie agent, Kate Green. While they gather intelligence at the fifth basement floor of the European headquarters of the AMS in Italy (London in the Japanese dub), a sudden earthquake rocks the room while they talk, collapsing the basement walls and leaving the agents trapped.

Several days later, as the two await a rescue team, James' PDA goes off, and a group of undead are seen on the security cameras. Realizing that they are in danger, James has Kate gather all the weaponry they can find to defend themselves. Soon after, the two travel through the sewers to an information room, where they uncover a plot to fire nuclear missiles worldwide within 24 hours' time, facing the four-armed giant zombie, the Justice, and a pair of mutant tarantulas known as The Lovers along the way. Taking the subway into zombie-infested streets from an underground shopping district, the agents narrowly avoid attacks by The Empress, a double-ended chainsaw-wielding assassin, and the massive, obese, and nearly impervious Temperance.

James and Kate then learn that the late one-time CEO of the now-defunct DBR Corporation, Caleb Goldman, is responsible for the resurgence of undead. All of his messages and current plans were set in motion, even before his death. Upon reaching the surface, they find the city completely obliterated. Goldman sends them a PDA message indicating that the launch will occur in one hour. The agents head for the abandoned Goldman Building and upon arrival, a levitating humanoid named The Star confronts them in the foyer. After the Star is defeated, the duo arrive in time to halt the missile launch, though it is revealed that Goldman's true intention is to revert humankind to its original state in order to prevent them from harming the planet further. As such, his final legacy, The World, a cryokinetic insectoid humanoid, is released in the opening of "Pandora's Box" to fulfill its role as the successor to his original Emperor project in 2000, having developed underground since his death. As the AMS agents fight it, The World continuously evolves to become larger and more powerful. Following The World's second defeat, James sets his PDA to self-destruct and, telling Kate not to give up hope, sacrifices himself to destroy The World in the ensuing explosion. A shaken and distraught Kate Green walks out of Caleb Goldman's premises.

=== Endings ===
The game has four endings available depending on the player's performance result during the game, which at the end of either endings, the screen displays "The story continues in The House of the Dead III".

- Standard Ending: A view of Caleb Goldman's computer playing a recording of him saying that "the human race hasn't been eliminated", instructing to "travel north" while musing that "hope is such a splendid thing" as he leaves the room.
- Bad Ending: The ending plays out the same as the standard ending, but the camera pans on Goldman's face, showing him changing into a zombie.
- "G" Ending: G appears outside the Goldman building, and states that the zombie crisis has not yet ended while telling James to rest in peace and he will assist the heroes to face what awaits. This ending has G in his House of the Dead III appearance, suggesting to have taken place after his appearance in The House of the Dead 4 Special and right before the events of The House of The Dead III, as the game suggests the story continues there.
- Mystery Man Ending: The unnamed mysterious man previously seen in one of The House of the Dead III's endings sits in his study, declaring Caleb Goldman to be soft and that humans have no need of hope, before stating that the true end shall soon begin and that there is more than one Pandora's Box.

== The House of the Dead 4 Special ==
The House of the Dead 4 Special flyer, showing the theater unit and the seat

The House of the Dead 4 Special is a two-player attraction based on The House of the Dead 4. The game makes use of two 100-inch screens, one in front of the players and another behind, as well as a five-speaker sound system, giving the impression that enemies are attacking from all directions. The seat shakes when zombies attack, and players are blasted with air whenever they take damage. The seat automatically rotates to face the players towards whichever screen zombies are attacking from. The game also features a new addition of a life bar. As the players are hit the life bar diminishes. If the life bar is reduced to zero the game is over. There are no continues. The PlayStation 3 port of The House of the Dead 4 Special is unlocked by completing The House of the Dead 4 for the first time. However, it uses lives rather than the life bar and allow players to continue.

This game features a side story in The House of the Dead plotline, taking place shortly after The House of the Dead 4, with Kate Green teaming up with Agent "G" to destroy the zombie infestation at its source, leading them to confront the Magician, a boss character who returns after having been obliterated in the first two installments. This game only features two bosses, Justice and Magician; "G" and Kate encounter the latter boss in a room of a building that "G" believes to be the source of the zombie infestation. In order to defeat the Magician, players must reduce its life bar to zero, then throw a grenade within ten seconds to destroy a controller it picks up.

In a two-player game, players are judged on how compatible they are based on performance alone.

=== Endings ===
The game has two endings available depending on whether the players destroy the Magician's controller and on the player's performance result during the game.

- "Bad Ending": If the players either miss or do not throw the grenade within 10 seconds, the Magician activates clones of itself.
- Standard Ending: If the throw connects, the Magician says, "Nothing can erase my pain," and then explodes. Performing well throughout the game will unlock an extra scene where the Mystery Man limps into the room, proclaims that Pandora's box has been closed, but ponders if there is any hope left for the humans, remarking that "the Wheel of Fate cannot be stopped" (alluding to The House of the Dead III).

== Reception ==
Reception

Aggregate score
Aggregator	Score
Metacritic	73/100 (PS3)

Review scores
Publication	Score
GamesMaster	83% (PS3)
Play	82% (PS3)
Gaming Age	A− (PS3)

The original arcade game received positive reviews when it was released. In July 2005, IGN said that it "may be the most visually impressive arcade game ever made," noting the improved lighting and the zombie and environmental details. They also praised the gameplay, including the increased number of zombies on screen, "intense" experience, boss battles, the use of machine guns, and the light gun's new shaking detection feature. The same month, 1UP praised the "next-gen visuals" and the improvements to the gameplay, such as the new "shaking" gameplay mechanic and the "hordes of zombies on screen at once." Arcade Belgium praised the arcade game, including the graphics, noting "thirty or so enemies at the same time" with each "very detailed" and "behaving his own way", as well as "bump mapping (seen for instance on enemies' visible muscles)," complex lightning effects such as reflections, particle effects on impact, "fog (in the sewers)," high polygon counts for each monster, realistic water, and elaborate scenery. They also praised the gameplay, including the new lighter gun, "emergency grenades, new reloading method" and the "gun shaking" trick. They gave it ratings, out of 20, of 17 for addictiveness, 18 for graphics, 16 for sound, and 17 for gameplay, with 17 out of 20 overall.
