= The House of the Dead: Overkill =

2009 video game

- North American Wii box art
- Developers: Headstrong Games; Modern Dream (Typing of the Dead)
- Publisher: Sega
- Directors: Steve Pritchard; Tancred Dyke-Wells
- Producers: Bradley Crooks; Neil McEwan
- Designer: Alastair Halsby
- Programmer: Ian Crowther
- Artists: Mark Slater; Casey Fulton
- Writer: Jonathan Burroughs
- Composers: John Sanderson; Nadeem Daya
- Series: The House of the Dead
- Engine: BlitzTech
- Platforms: Wii, PlayStation 3, Windows, iOS, Android
- Release: February 10, 2009: Wii; NA: February 10, 2009; EU: February 13, 2009; AU: February 19, 2009; JP: September 17, 2009 PlayStation 3 (Extended Cut); NA: October 25, 2011; EU: October 28, 2011; AU: October 27, 2011; JP: February 23, 2012 iOS, Android (The Lost Reels); WW: April 25, 2013 Windows (Typing of the Dead: Overkill); WW: October 29, 2013
- Genres: Rail shooter, light gun shooter
- Modes: Single-player, multiplayer

The House of the Dead: Overkill is a 2009 on-rails light gun shooter game developed by Headstrong Games and published by Sega for the Wii. It is a spin-off of The House of the Dead series, a non-canonical prequel to the original game chronologically, and the first in the series to be released solely on a home console. An Extended Cut edition for PlayStation 3, compatible with the PlayStation Move accessory, was released in 2011. A mobile version, The Lost Reels, was released on iOS and Android devices in 2013.

An alternate version, The Typing of the Dead: Overkill, was released for Microsoft Windows in 2013, replacing the game's shooting gameplay with keyboard typing mechanics from 1999's The Typing of the Dead. It includes the original shooting mechanics as an option.

After the game's initial Wii release, no new installments to the series were released for nearly a decade; the next game in the series would be the arcade-exclusive House of the Dead: Scarlet Dawn, a sequel to The House of the Dead 4, that was released in 2018.

== Gameplay ==
Like previous games in the House of the Dead series, Overkill is a rail shooter, with the character moving along a predetermined path, and the shooting element under player control by pointing the Wii Remote at the screen, moving the aiming reticle. The player can point the reticle near the edge of the screen to move the camera angle slightly in that direction, allowing a further field of view known as "Danger Cam". The story mode can be played solo or with another human player, with one weapon or dual-wielding controls, once the option is unlocked.

Players can also build up a combo meter by killing mutants to receive a score, with further points gained by performing head shots, shooting bonus pickup, saving civilians and attaining multiple kills without missing a shot. If one or both players die, points from their overall scores can be spent to continue playing. At the end of each level, players are awarded a grade that depends on their final score among other factors such as not dying, and accuracy of shots. Along with score bonuses, other pick ups scattered throughout levels include health packs, grenades, the "Slow Mo-Fo" pick up that puts everything into slow motion temporarily and the "Evil Eye" feature in which shooting a certain environmental point destroys any lurking mutants nearby.

New guns and gun upgrades can be bought with cash earned from the player's end of level score, between levels at the Gun Shop. Upon completing the story mode, Director's Cut is unlocked providing the same game as story mode but with tougher enemies, extended levels and a limited amount of continues.

== Plot ==
During the Cold War, the U.S. military begins testing a superhuman formula called Formula X, which turns test subjects into violent mutants. Following this, the bunker for the experiments is shut down and abandoned. In 1991, AMS Special Agent G is given his first assignment and sent to a small town in Louisiana to investigate a series of disappearances and hunt down crime boss Papa Caesar. Due to the mutant outbreak, G is forced to team up with police detective Isaac Washington who is out to avenge his father's murder, which Caesar masterminded.

The pair first storm a mansion owned by Caesar out in the woods; upon reaching the basement, they find Caesar gone, having fled the mansion, and tetraplegic scientist Jasper Guns horrifically mutated from injecting himself with an unknown substance. Upon defeating Jasper, G and Isaac meet Varla Guns, a stripper and Jasper's sister who swears vengeance on Caesar. G and Isaac eventually track Caesar to an abandoned hospital. After dispatching the mutants and battling a mutant woman called the Screamer, they find a ringing phone hidden inside the Screamer. As they answer it, Caesar taunts both G and Isaac before rigging the hospital to explode. G and Isaac manage to escape the explosion, and hitch a ride on Varla's motorbike. As the three get into an argument, Varla abandons G and Isaac, who then go through a mutant-infested carnival to investigate, where they fight a conjoined mutant named Nigel and Sebastian. They and Varla then manage to catch up with Caesar at a train station, but as they argue over what to do with him, Caesar escapes on a train as G and Isaac give chase. The pair make their way through the mutant-infested train where they fight a mutant mantis called the Crawler, but an explosion causes the train to crash in a swamp where Caesar takes Varla hostage and drives off before leaving a cassette tape. G and Isaac then make their way through the swamps in an attempt to find an alternate way to wherever Caesar and Varla were heading for, dispatching more mutants and a giant mutant called the Lobber in the process.

As they exit the swamp, G and Isaac manage to track Caesar to a high security prison. Before they enter, they run into its eccentric warden, Clement Darling, who points the two in the direction of Caesar and Varla, but claims to know nothing about the mutants. As G and Isaac fight their way through the prison, they finally reach the electric chair theater where they find Varla and Caesar strapped to the chairs. Clement then reveals that he was behind the mutant outbreak and that Caesar was just an accomplice before electrocuting him. Following this, Clement explains that his experiments were to save his dying mother. Clement then descends on a giant elevator along with Varla, his mother, and Caesar's corpse. Seconds later, two gigantic, physically enhanced, convicts wearing black masks lumber in through the door, and one of them (who is named Brutus) suddenly turns around and beats his fellow convict to death before turning his attention to G and Isaac.

After dealing with Brutus and descending the elevator in pursuit of Clement, G and Isaac fight their way through hordes of mutants inside Clement's underground lab before finally reaching his center of operations. They discover Varla's brain has been taken out and kept alive in a jar, while Clement's mother's brain has been transplanted into Varla's body. At first it seems the experiment is successful, but as Varla's body begins to convulse, she falls into a pit after being gunned down by G and Isaac, mutating her into a giant monster called the Mother. As the duo prepare to face off against the creature, the screen cuts to a missing reel screen for a few moments. Once the reel resumes, G and Isaac are outside claiming victory over Clement and the Mother, thanking the use of miniguns they found randomly lying in the armory nearby. However, the Mother regains consciousness and the pair battle her again. After finally killing it, Clement appears and seeks to atone for all the problems he caused by "returning to the womb" and enters the monster's body.

G and Isaac are picked up by a helicopter along with Varla's brain in a jar. Isaac then releases the detonator to destroy the facility. G tells Varla of his feelings for her, prompting him and Isaac to discuss the moral and political messages in the game's storyline and potential backlash, particularly from feminists. Soon after, the two realize the helicopter is being piloted by a mutant and point their guns at it, ending the game in a cliffhanger.

In Extended Cut, there are two new levels featuring Varla Guns and her fellow stripper named Candi Stryper, who was in love with Jasper Guns. It is a side story during the main game (set after the second and fourth levels), featuring the girls traveling through a strip club and a meat-packing plant, fighting grotesque mutant strippers Coco and Sindy, as well as minotauroid female butcher Meat Katie. The side story ends with Candi dying of blood loss after the battle with Meat Katie.

After the credits roll, Caesar's tape recording is played, revealing a message to Isaac that Clement's plans were small-minded but he has powerful friends (most likely a reference to Roy Curien, Caleb Goldman, and Thornheart), and that Isaac's father is still alive.

=== Characters ===
- Agent G: An inexperienced but highly trained agent, he graduated top of his class at the AMS academy and is now on his first assignment.
- Detective Isaac Washington: A hard-drinking, ladies' man, Washington is also a habitual rule and heart-breaker. He took the assignment to exact revenge for his father's death. He has a habit of dropping F-bombs. Game Informer ranked him among the "Top 10 Heroes of 2009", declaring that "Foul-mouthed, uncompromising, hard drinking, and unceasingly funny, Isaac Washington keeps everything grounded when the world is going crazy all around him. With tongue set firmly in cheek, Washington is a stereotypical career cop who can't finish a sentence without a few expletives thrown in for color. He keeps the action going, and never fails to say what the player is thinking when the zombie outbreak gets out of hand."
- Papa Caesar: Deranged crime lord and the game's main antagonist. Caesar has forced Varla's brother Jasper into devising a strange compound with mutagenic effects. With the help of Warden Darling he sets to work transforming the innocent inhabitants of Bayou City into mutants and monsters. He also likes Chinese food. Game Informer ranked him among the "Top 10 Villains of 2009", declaring that "Many villains have unleashed genetic abominations and blown us up, but none did it while wearing a stylish ascot. Papa Caesar makes engineering the zombie apocalypse look good. Analogizing Isaac Washington's death to a sweet and sour Chinese dinner seals his position on the list."
- Varla Guns: The hottest stripper on the Bayou City club scene, Varla is also the older sister to crippled scientific genius Jasper Guns. She joins the agents to stop Papa Caesar, and a love triangle develops. In The Lost Reels, she is a downloadable content (DLC) playable character and can be unlocked by purchasing the DLC chapter—Naked Terror.
- Candi Stryper: A young stripper and former lover of Varla Guns' younger brother Jasper. After finding out the death of Jasper, Candi joins Varla to seek revenge against Papa Caesar and together, they fight off the mutants and seek Papa Caesar to avenge the death of Jasper. Candi is exclusive to the PlayStation 3 version. In The Lost Reels, like Varla, she is also a DLC playable character and can be unlocked by purchasing the DLC chapter—Naked Terror.
- Warden Clement Darling: A strange and unsettling man who oversees a high security prison just outside town, Darling is involved in gruesome scientific experiments to prolong the life of his elderly mother. He is later revealed to be the game's true, overarching antagonist and the mastermind of the events.

== Development ==
The game was originally intended to follow the same style as previous The House of the Dead games, while other themes such as steampunk were also considered. Headstrong ultimately chose a theme inspired by exploitation films after watching the film Planet Terror, which inspired the art direction, plot and marketing.

Most of the main characters were modeled after several famous individuals. For example, Detective Washington was modeled after rapper Common, Varla Guns after glamor model Vikki Blows, Papa Caesar after Burt Reynolds, Jasper Guns after Stephen Hawking, and Agent G on Keanu Reeves as he appears in Point Break.

== Music ==
The soundtrack is written and composed by John Sanderson and Nadeem Daya. The songs are pop, rock, funk, country and disco genres of the 1970s era. Despite many requests from fans, neither Sega nor Headstrong Games have any plans to release an official soundtrack, although there exist bootleg versions on the Internet. In 2015, PitStop Productions released an uncut version of the soundtrack on SoundCloud, which does not include new music added in the Extended Cut.

== Release ==
The House of the Dead: Overkill was originally released on the Wii on February 10, 2009, in North America and February 13, 2009, in Europe. The game was later released in Japan on September 17, 2009, bundled with the Wii Zapper accessory.

The game was also released in a limited collector's edition that includes a graphic novel prequel to the game called Prelude to an Overkill. A special release of the game in Australia, the "Bang Bang Box", comes packaged with the graphic novel in addition to two Wii Remote gun shells modeled after the AMS pistols carried by the main characters in the game (similar to a revolver).

=== Extended Cut ===
On October 25, 2011, the game was released on the PlayStation 3 with PlayStation Move compatibility in North America, Europe and Australia and on February 23, 2012, in Japan. It came with the Sixaxis controllers and DualShock 3 titled The House of the Dead: Overkill – Extended Cut. (Note: Known in Japan as Za hausu Obu za deddo ōbākiru Direkutāzukatto (Japanese: ザ・ハウス・オブ・ザ・デッド オーバーキル ディレクターズカット; lit. The House of the Dead: Overkill Director's Cut)) Extended Cut features the same on-rails gameplay with all-new redone High Definition cutscenes and levels, albeit still virtually identical to the Wii version, including that the missing reel is restored. The game also has 3D compatibility with the use of an HD 3D TV. Music and audio are still the same along with new music featured.

Exclusive are two new levels not included in the original Wii release, "Naked Terror" and "Creeping Flesh". They both serve as a sidestory in-between the main game featuring Varla Gunns and a new female character, stripper Candi Stryper. They contain new enemy types (strippers, meat plantation workers and skinless zombies), additional bonus materials for the player to collect, and two new boss battles. New weapons like a crossbow and a few others have been added to Extended Cut as well as an entirely new in-game screen layout. Extras from the Wii version like the mini games and Director's Cut mode also make it to the Extended Cut, along with new content. A pre-order comic book, Prelude to an Overkill is available in-game as a collectible bonus material.

=== The Lost Reels ===
The House of the Dead: Overkill – The Lost Reels was released for iOS and Android devices on April 25, 2013. The game is split into three chapters, with the first two included and the latter third requiring an additional fee. Money can also be spent in exchange for coins that can unlock better weapons, including some based on other Sega games such as Vectorman. The Lost Reels eventually became free-to-play until Sega removed the game from the App Store a year later due to negative reviews.

=== The Typing of the Dead: Overkill ===
The Typing of the Dead: Overkill, developed by Modern Dream, was simultaneously announced and released on Microsoft Windows on October 29, 2013. The game follows the same premise of the 1999 game, The Typing of the Dead, following the same storyline of Overkill: Extended Cut, but requiring players to type out words and phrases using a keyboard to defeat zombies as opposed to shooting them. The game also includes the Extended Cut version of The House of the Dead: Overkill, playable with a mouse or controller, and features downloadable dictionaries and multiplayer after an update.

The game began development at Blitz Games Studios, which was liquidated in September 2013. Upon the studio's closure, the development team were able to convince Sega to let them complete the game under a new license. Several DLC text packs have been released that replace the typed words. Shakespeare and Filth packs were released in 2013 and the Love at First Bite (Valentine's Day-themed) pack was released in 2014.

== Reception ==
Reception

Aggregate score
Aggregator	Score
Metacritic	78/100

Review scores
Publication	Score
1Up.com	B−
Edge	8/10
Eurogamer	8/10
Famitsu	6/10, 6/10, 6/10, 6/10
Game Informer	8.5
GamePro	3.5/5
GameSpot	8/10
GamesRadar+	4/5
IGN	8.3/10
Nintendo Power	8/10

Upon release, The House of the Dead: Overkill received a generally favorable response from critics, with an average review score of 81% at GameRankings and 79/100 at Metacritic. Many critics praised the fast-paced balanced gameplay, with X-Play stating "the arcade style shooting is satisfying and provides a challenge for experienced players" yet "easily conquered for those who can't aim a Wiimote to save their life." GamesRadar found the simple gameplay to be "varied enough to keep the momentum going." Although considered to be easier than past games of the series, GameSpot calling the difficulty a "cake walk" at pure gore and bloodiest game times, Eurogamer opined the game "almost never tries your patience, and it's made with such infectious and irreverent glee and such obvious pride, you can't help but join in." The over-the-top B movie grindhouse style was particularly praised. Game Informer stated "the parade of F-bombs and one-liners fit in perfect harmony with the grindhouse presentation", even recommending it to Tarantino fans. GameSpot claimed it "reinvents the aging shooter series for the better with an over-the-top grindhouse theme that resonates in its every aspect, from the hilarious story to the fantastic vintage soundtrack." Edge stated that Overkill "raises the bar for third party production values on this generation's best-selling console." Nintendo Power enjoyed the on rail shooter gameplay but thought that the game was "too easy"--especially when played with another player. Though 1UP "still enjoyed the game", they did consider that "with its constant stream of expletives and toilet humor, it may turn just as many people away" and started their review with a disclaimer for younger gamers not to play, being strictly an adult game. Another issue critics found was a number of technical issues, particularly with the frame rate, which IGN called "sketchy" and "sad to see in a game that has so much amazing content in it." GamePro also experienced this, notably when "the screen became cluttered with enemies", originally hoping the issue to be fixed before the game's final release. Another issue were glitches, with Computer and Video Games reportedly experiencing no enemies appearing at all at times and sometimes requiring to restart the console.

On the Special Achievement Award, GameSpot awarded Overkill Funniest Game of 2009, going on to say: "The interplay between Washington and Special Agent G is pure gold. Like Martin and Lewis with F-bombs. Mix that up with grindball atmosphere and Overkill cements its place as the funniest game of 2009." The game received a Guinness World Record for being the most profane video game in history. Jonathan Burroughs, the game's writer, said: "It is a dubious honor to receive such an accolade working in an industry where so often the fruits of your labors are derided and dismissed for being puerile or irresponsible. But in the case of The House Of The Dead: Overkill, a little puerility was the order of business. Parodying the profane excess of grindhouse cinema was (game developer) Headstrong Games' objective and I am flattered that this record acknowledges that we not only rose to that challenge, but entirely exceeded it." This record was beaten a year later by Mafia II.

The NPD Group reported that the game sold 45,000 units in the United States in its debut month. Sega of America has expressed satisfaction with the game's sales numbers, claiming that it has "absolutely met our expectations."
