= Zombie Revenge =

1999 arcade game

- Arcade flyer featuring the game's playable characters
- Developers: Sega AM1; Data East
- Publisher: Sega
- Series: The House of the Dead
- Platforms: Arcade, Dreamcast
- Release: Arcade: JP: February 1999; NA: May 1999; Dreamcast: JP: November 25, 1999; NA: January 25, 2000; EU: June 9, 2000
- Genre: Beat 'em up
- Modes: Single-player, multiplayer
- Arcade system: Sega NAOMI

Zombie Revenge (Note: Japanese: ゾンビ・リベンジ, Hepburn: Zonbi Ribenji) is a 1999 beat 'em up video game developed by Sega AM1 and Data East and published by Sega for arcades, with a port for the Dreamcast released the same year. Players are tasked with ridding a city infested with zombies, using hand-to-hand combat and weapons. Originally titled Blood Bullet: The House of the Dead Side Story, the game was renamed Zombies Nightmare before Sega decided on the name Zombie Revenge.

The game serves as a spin-off of Sega's popular The House of the Dead series, and contains numerous references to its parent series. A port of the game for the PlayStation 2 was to be released by Acclaim Entertainment and ported by Acclaim Studios Teesside, but was eventually canceled.

== Plot ==
A top-secret government plan to utilize the dead for military purposes called U.D.S., Undead Soldier is thrown into darkness by some unknown entity. A year later, the city becomes ravaged by zombies. Three of the best AMS agents are sent in: Stick Breitling, Linda Rotta and Rikiya Busujima. They are sent out to eliminate the enemy and track down the mysterious leader of this attack, known only as "Zed". After battling through the city, they eventually confront Zed, who reveals that Stick's father was involved in project U.D.S. Zed wants revenge for his parents, who were murdered as part of the project. He despises all humans and wishes to turn them all into zombies by spreading the virus. Zed unleashes a powerful U.D.S. inside of him that he calls the God of Destruction, that he plans to use to destroy the rest of the humans, before the three agents defeat him and save humanity.

== Gameplay ==
Players battle zombies and bosses in each level through hand-to-hand combat, guns, or other weapons. Each player chooses one of the three characters with different attributes and various levels of proficiency in hand-to-hand combat and guns. The Dreamcast version of the game adds a Battle Mode in which two players can fight each other in one-on-one combat.

As a spin-off, the game contains various references to the original The House of the Dead game. Zombies sound and look the same as they did in the first game, and the main protagonists from both the original series and Revenge are AMS agents. At the start of the game, computer icons of Thomas Rogan and "G" can be seen on Linda's desktop. The Curien Mansion seen in the first House of the Dead appears as its own stage, called "The House of the Dead" and the music from the first stage is used. The final boss of Revenge is called Black Magician Type 01. The game's credits sequence are also similar, going back through the game's stages to the beginning of the game.

== Reception ==
Reception

Aggregate score
Aggregator	Score	
Aggregator	Arcade	Dreamcast
Metacritic	N/A	60/100

Review scores
Publication	Score	
Publication	Arcade	Dreamcast
AllGame	3.5/5	2.5/5
CNET Gamecenter	N/A	8/10
Edge	N/A	5/10
Electronic Gaming Monthly	N/A	8/10 (Note: Four critics of Electronic Gaming Monthly gave the Dreamcast version all scores each of 8/10.)
EP Daily	N/A	8/10
Famitsu	N/A	7/10, 8/10, 8/10, 9/10
Game Informer	8.5/10	6.75/10
GameFan	N/A	(J.W.) 97% 89% (Note: In GameFan' viewpoint of the Dreamcast version, three critics gave it each a score of 95, 83, and 89.)
GameRevolution	N/A	C+
GameSpot	N/A	5.7/10
GameSpy	N/A	5.5/10
IGN	N/A	5.9/10
Next Generation	N/A	2/5

In Japan, Game Machine listed the arcade version of Zombie Revenge as the third most successful arcade game of April 1999.

Upon release, the Dreamcast version received "mixed" reviews according to the review aggregation website Metacritic. Chris Charla of NextGen said of the game, "It looks great, it plays OK, but you'll be done with it forever in four hours. Find a video store and rent it." In Japan, Famitsu gave it a score of 32 out of 40.

In one review, Four-Eyed Dragon of GamePro said of the Dreamcast version, "For those who didn't get enough beat-em-up action from Dynamite Cop, Zombie Revenge is worth renting. Otherwise, the boredom of the lobotomized hit-and-kick action will wear down any brawler." (Note: GamePro gave the Dreamcast version 3.5/5 for graphics, two 2.5/5 scores for sound and fun factor, and 3/5 for control in one review.) Uncle Dust said in another review that the same console version "has its high-octane action and graphics, which translates into mindless fun for a while. But the frustrations of the game, including its limited replay value and annoying sound and controls, keep this game from being a 'must-own' for all action addicts, and just makes it a 'should-rent,' if you're bored and [you] have a friend who also likes carnage." (Note: GamePro gave the Dreamcast version 4.5/5 for graphics, 2.5/5 for sound, 3/5 for control, and 3.5/5 for fun factor in another review.)
