= Slime Forest Adventure =

2006 video game

- Developer(s): LRNJ
- Platform(s): Microsoft Windows; OS X; Linux
- Genre(s): Role-playing video game, educational
- Mode(s): Single-player

Slime Forest Adventure is a language learning game designed by LRNJ.com . It teaches Japanese characters through a retro-styled RPG. Based on the Japanese model, combat is controlled by the user recognising and typing the on-screen characters in a manner similar to the Sega game The Typing of the Dead.

Slime Forest Adventure includes over 2000 kanji in addition to the hiragana and katakana syllabaries. Unlike many other language-teaching games, Slime Forest is a fully functioning RPG even without its educational function.

This idea was copied for the unofficial game Knuckles in China Land which uses graphics derived from the popular Sonic the Hedgehog franchise.
