= The House of the Dead III =

2002 video game

- European arcade flyer
- Developer: Wow Entertainment
- Publisher: Sega
- Director: Takashi Oda
- Producer: Kazunari Tsukamoto
- Composer: Eriko Sakurai
- Series: The House of the Dead
- Platforms: Arcade, Xbox, Windows, Wii, PlayStation 3
- Release: Arcade: NA: September 2002; JP: December 19, 2002; EU: 2002; Xbox: NA: October 24, 2002; EU: March 14, 2003; JP: January 30, 2003; Windows: EU: February 11, 2005; JP: March 17, 2005; Wii: NA: March 11, 2008; JP: March 19, 2008; AU: March 27, 2008; EU: March 28, 2008; PlayStation 3: NA: February 7, 2012; EU: February 15, 2012; JP: April 19, 2012
- Genre: Light gun shooter
- Modes: Single-player, multiplayer
- Arcade system: Sega Chihiro

The House of the Dead III (Note: Japanese: ザ・ハウス・オブ・ザ・デッドIII, Hepburn: Za Hausu obu za Deddo Surī) is a 2002 light gun shooter video game developed by Wow Entertainment and published by Sega for arcades. The third installment of the House of the Dead series, it continues the story of the previous games and introduces new gameplay concepts. The game's secondary protagonist is Lisa Rogan, daughter of Thomas Rogan and Sophie Richards.

The game was later ported to the Xbox in 2003, Microsoft Windows in 2005, the Wii in 2008 in a compilation with The House of the Dead 2, and PlayStation 3 (via PlayStation Network) in 2012 with PlayStation Move support. It was also remade with typing controls as The Typing of the Dead 2 in 2008.

== Plot ==
In 2019, 21 years after the events of the 1998 Curien Mansion incident, a zombie infestation has spread to each countries, resulting in the collapse of the civilization of the human race and leaving the world in utter desolation. A paramilitary force led by retired AMS agent Thomas Rogan head to a desert wasteland in an unnamed U.S. state on a mission to infiltrate the EFI Research Facility, once owned by Dr. Curien, and investigate its connection to the current state of the world. During the course of the raid, all members of Rogan's team are killed except for his second-in-command, Captain Dan Taylor; both agents continued with the mission and reach a giant laboratory, where they find the source, but are attacked by Death, a gigantic zombie security guard protecting the facility, who kills Taylor. Injured from the encounter, Rogan is assisted by an unknown individual before all communication with him is lost.

Two weeks later, on October 31, Rogan's daughter, Lisa, and his former partner, Agent "G", travel to the facility to rescue him. While navigating through the facility, they fend off against hordes of undead creatures before they encounter Death, whom they fight twice. Later, they fight a deformed mutant sloth named the Fool while locked in a cage, where it was feeding on the bodies of dead scientists, and a mutated tendril-covered plant named the Sun. Along the way, Lisa muses to "G" how she has to live in the shadows of her well-known father and that she is often the subject of his comparison.

Throughout the game, flashbacks reveal Curien's motivation in his obsession of studying matters of life and death that resulted in him triggering the Curien Mansion's outbreak back in 1998; he was desperate in searching for a cure to treat his son, Daniel, who was suffering from a terminal illness. His increasingly unethical methods led him to believe he would be able to change the world for a better future by developing the mutation.

After more fights, Lisa and "G" reunite with Rogan, where they meet by the same individual who rescued Rogan in the prologue, revealed to be Daniel Curien, who laments his father's experiments that destroyed the world. After Rogan reveals on how Daniel tended to him, G gets Rogan to safety, while Daniel and Lisa form an alliance to destroy an electrokinetic entity known as the Wheel of Fate, engaging in a brutal showdown with a zombified Dan Taylor along the way. When they reach the same giant laboratory where Rogan was injured, Daniel reveals to Lisa's horror that the Wheel of Fate is actually his father Dr. Curien, whose body was used as a test subject for the entity and underwent a 19-year resurrection process following his death by the Magician, before adding that he hacked the program used in its creation some time prior to Lisa and G's arrival, in order to prevent it from being released and destroying the world, saying that the future belongs to the people who are still alive and fighting. The two fight and manage to defeat and kill the Wheel of Fate, which explodes.

=== Endings ===
The game has four endings, each played depending on the player's performance and the final path they took in the game.

- For players who achieve a ranking of B, C, D, or E, they will be rewarded with an ending which shows "G", Lisa, and Rogan leaving the facility with Daniel, who states that he will not let his father's efforts go to waste and will come back to the EFI lab if humans go down the wrong path again.
- The second ending is essentially the same as the first, except that Daniel loses the will to go on and transforms into a zombie in front of the horrified Lisa. This occurs when a player's rank consists of (three or more) A or S ranks and if the player defeated Death as the Chapter 4 boss.
- The third ending shows Daniel and Lisa discovering that a zombie had stolen Lisa and G's van, wherein Lisa gives chase with Daniel following her while G and Rogan watch from a distance. This occurs when a player's rank consists of (three or more) A or S ranks and if the player defeated Sun as the Chapter 4 boss.
- The fourth ending depicts a mysterious man in a business suit (eventually revealed to be Thornheart from House of the Dead: Scarlet Dawn) entering the laboratory where the Wheel of Fate battle took place and picking up one of Curien's vials, muttering that Curien did not understand its true purpose. This occurs only when a player's rank consists of (three or more) A or S ranks and if the player defeated Fool as the Chapter 4 boss.

== Gameplay ==
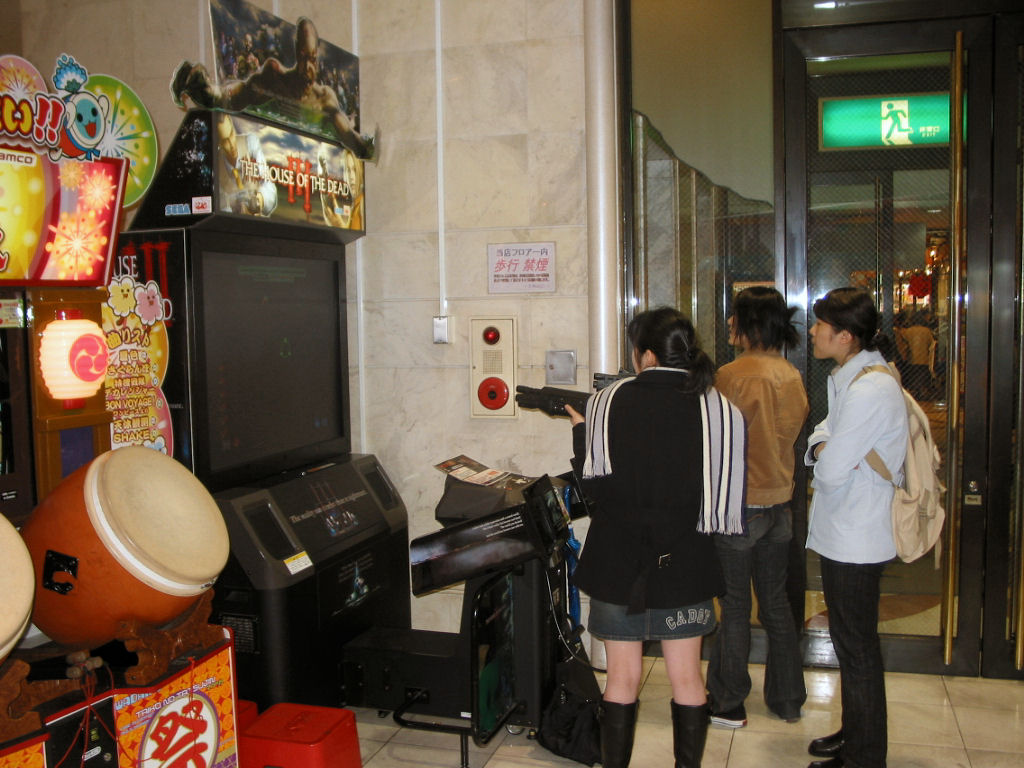
Girls playing The House of the Dead III at an arcade in Japan, 2005

The House of the Dead III departs from the original games in many ways, including weaponry; player characters are equipped with shotguns, rather than the semiautomatic pistols used in the first two games. The shotgun used in the Xbox version of III no longer requires the traditional "point off-screen" reload, but rather reloads automatically. Reloading still takes time, but happens without prompt as soon as the gun needs it. The arcade version differs here, because there is the presence of light guns, allowing for similar speedy reloading. A reload is achieved by pumping the shotgun controller. While playing the game on Xbox, the light gun controller released by Madcatz may be used; however, the traditional "shoot off-screen" reload was reintroduced in the Wii version.

A branching storyline existed in the previous games, but was handled differently. In The House of the Dead III, the player is given options for navigating through the game prior to the start of most stages, ultimately going through the same areas with different results dependent on the order chosen.

Another important difference is the absence of civilians. Unlike the first two The House of the Dead games, in which players could rescue various people in peril, The House of the Dead III contains no extra personnel beyond those central to the plot. Instead, "Rescue Events" occur during each stage in which players will need to rescue their partners from attacking zombies. An extra life is rewarded for each successful rescue. If all rescue events are successful, players find crates in the room before the final boss that, when shot, drop a lot of bonuses and lives.

A new concept of the series comes in the form of a "Cancel" bar. In previous installments, the bosses' weak point would only need to be shot once to stun the attack. In this game, the bosses' weak point must be shot repeatedly to drain the "Cancel" bar and stop the enemy's attack.

Another major change to the gameplay comes in the form of a new rank and grade system. Players are now graded on how fast they dispose of the zombies, ranging from Excellent, Good, Faster, and Twin Shot, the last taking place if two zombies are killed with the same shotgun shell. A letter grade is also given at the end of each stage, ranging from S, A, B, C, D and E. Completing the stage with an A rank will award the player with an extra life, while an S rank will reward the player with two. A final grade is given at the end of the game, and depending on how many S ranks were received for each stage, the player may be given a "SS" rank as the final grade.

Extra lives and bonus points are also handled differently. In the previous arcade installments, nothing would happen if a player had all five lives and gained another. Now the player can have up to nine lives at a time, and any additional lives are turned into bonus points. In the previous games, bonus points could also be gained by shooting hidden objects such as a golden frog, or coin. The House of the Dead III expands upon this, introducing a silver coin that can be shot repeatedly, a wind-up robot that must be shot several times, and a golden miniature version of the recurring boss The Magician. Decaying zombies and weak points on stunned bosses can also be shot repeatedly for gaining extra points.

On the Xbox, PC, PlayStation 3 and Wii versions, there is a "Time Attack" mode where the player's lives come in the form of a timer, starting at 45 seconds. Excellent, Good, Faster and Twin Shots give extra time, as do clocks in the background, successful rescue events and end-of-stage bonuses. Getting hit by a zombie subtracts 7 seconds, projectiles subtract 5, and bosses subtract 15. Stunning a boss grants the player 10 seconds. Every successful hit on the final boss also grants two seconds, and does not require a stun. The game cannot be continued if the timer reaches zero, and at the end of each game Dr. Curien gives his analysis of the player's performance. The player may also note the average distance at which they managed to hold back the undead in metres.

== Development ==
Early previews of the game utilized Cel shading for the graphical style, with vibrant colors and solid outlines. Later previews showed a modified art style, still utilizing, in the words of the developers, "lit, cel-shaded effects" but with "a more realistic polygonal form." This too was further modified in development and the final game uses more realistic shading in line with its predecessor.

== The Typing of the Dead 2 ==
The Typing of the Dead 2
- Developer: Sega
- Publisher: Sega
- Series: The House of the Dead
- Platform: Windows
- Release: JP: March 6, 2008
- Genres: Action, education
- Modes: Single-player, multiplayer

The Typing of the Dead 2 is a revision of The House of the Dead III, and the second The Typing of the Dead game. It was released in Japan for Microsoft Windows on March 6, 2008. While The House of the Dead III is a light gun rail shooter, Typing replaces the gun with the keyboard. The game is an educational game, as it requires players to enhance their typing skills to be successful.

== Reception ==
Reception

Aggregate scores
Aggregator	Score
GameRankings	(Xbox) 70.72% (PS3) 63.63% (PC) 56.50%
Metacritic	(Xbox) 72/100 (PS3) 64/100

Review scores
Publication	Score
AllGame	2.5/5
Edge	6/10
Electronic Gaming Monthly	7.17/10
Eurogamer	3/10 (£40); 8/10 (£10)
Game Informer	6.5/10
GamePro	4/5
GameRevolution	C+
GameSpot	6.4/10
GameSpy	3/5
GameZone	(PS3) 8/10 (Xbox) 7/10
IGN	(Xbox) 8.1/10 (PS3) 6.5/10
Official Xbox Magazine (US)	6.9/10
The Cincinnati Enquirer	3.5/5
The Digital Fix	7/10

The game was met with mixed to positive reviews upon release. GameRankings gave it a score of 70.72% for the Xbox version, 56.50% for the PC version, and 63.63% for the PlayStation 3 version. Likewise, Metacritic gave it a score of 72 out of 100 for the Xbox version and 64 out of 100 for the PS3 version.

The Cincinnati Enquirer gave the Xbox version a score of three-and-a-half stars out of five and praised it for "the ability to mow down multiple enemies at once, enhanced graphics, a variety of endings and new creatures." The Digital Fix gave the PS3 version a score of seven out of ten and called it "a fun game to blast through, especially in two player mode, and on the PS3 the game is as close to arcade perfection as you are ever likely to get."
