= CarnEvil =

1998 video game

- Arcade flyer
- Developer: Midway Games
- Publisher: Midway Games
- Producers: Neil Nicastro; Kenneth J. Fedesna
- Designer: Jack Haeger
- Programmer: Samuel Christian Zehr
- Artists: Scott Pikulski; Samuel Lewis Crider; Martin Murphy; Rowan Atalla; Martin Martinez; Jack Haeger
- Composer: Kevin Quinn
- Platform: Arcade
- Release: NA: October 31, 1998
- Genre: Light-gun shooter
- Modes: Single-player, multiplayer
- Arcade system: Midway Seattle hardware

CarnEvil is a 1998 arcade light-gun shooter game developed and published by Midway Games. The premise follows a teenager who summons the titular haunted carnival, forcing him to fight through waves of gruesome monsters. The game is divided into four levels, and players use pump action shotguns to fight enemies, with temporary gun upgrades scattered throughout the levels.

CarnEvil was conceived by Jack Haeger, who was inspired by classic horror themes and films, and the concept was approved by Midway after recent successes in the light-gun shooter genre. Initially lighter in tone, the game was later revamped to accommodate darker humor and gore. Upon release, critics praised the game's visuals, gun design, and gory detail. The game was never ported to home consoles despite its commercial success and that of other light-gun shooters in the home market, though it served as inspiration for spiritual successors.

== Gameplay and premise ==
In this example of gameplay in CarnEvil, the player is attacked by an elf in the Rickety Town level.

CarnEvil is a light-gun shooter game in which the player, as an unnamed teenage everyman, must clear four levels by eliminating waves of various gruesome creatures such as evil clowns, sideshow freaks and Krampus's elves. The game's premise involves a teenager in the town of Greely Valley, Iowa fulfilling a local legend and becoming trapped in a nightmarish carnival ruled by ringmaster Professor Ludwig von Tökkentäkker. The first three levels can be played in any order with no effect on the gameplay, with the fourth level being accessed upon their completion. Each level opens with a sardonic greeting from Umlaut, a floating jester skull who serves as the game's host.

The cabinet comes with two pump action shotguns that can be reloaded by either physically cocking the gun or pulling the trigger off-screen. The gun fires single shots much like a pistol, and most of the enemy characters are dispatched in four shots. The player can temporarily upgrade their gun by shooting bullet-shaped symbols, granting it the quality of a shotgun, machine gun, flamethrower, or acid rounds. Enemy attacks drain the player's health, which can be replenished by shooting heart-shaped symbols.

The player's score is displayed on the upper side of the screen and is constantly updated. Extra points can be earned by eliminating enemies attempting to victimize the non-player character Betty. However, if Betty is shot instead, the player incurs a health penalty. When a level is cleared, shooting accuracy percentages are displayed for the players. Upon a playthrough's conclusion, top scorers can use the shotgun to write their initials or name, which will be displayed in a high score table.

== Development and release ==
CarnEvil was conceived by games designer Jack Haeger in 1988 while working on the run and gun game Narc. As part of the development team's experiments with live digitized footage for video games, Haegar began working with stop motion puppets in an attempt to recreate a cinematic experience. Haegar was fond of the classic horror movie premise of a teenager daring a friend to run through a graveyard, and sketched a concept piece based on this idea titled "Horror Show". The sketch, primarily depicting a decrepit haunted house, featured a poster with the "CarnEvil" name and a prototypical version of Umlaut named "Smeek". Although Haeger was aware that technical limitations at the time made the concept impractical, he saw potential in the "dark carnival" theme.

Midway Games approved Haeger's concept following the successful releases of the light-gun shooters Terminator 2: Judgment Day (1991) and Revolution X (1994), which Haegar co-directed. The game originally had a tone similar to The Haunted Mansion, and featured an old caretaker character with a Punch and Judy-style puppet. After this version was harshly reviewed by Midway's management, the development team revamped the concept with characters that were more aggressive and darkly humorous. This tone was set by Haeger's conceptual character Hambone, a large brute with a goaltender mask and a gatling gun arm who would become the miniboss of the Haunted House stage. Over 40 characters were created and modeled in 3D Studio Max. Artist and 3D modeler Scott Pikulski recalled that "Many ideas for characters and level content came from us just joking around while working on the game. It always felt like the project would be cancelled at any time, so we worked on it like we had nothing to lose. Jack has a great sense of humor, and many of the great ideas came from his head".

The spindly, angular qualities of Haeger's concept sketches were influenced by The Nightmare Before Christmas, while the expressive and disturbing qualities of the characters' faces were inspired by a black-and-white photobook titled Fellini's Faces. The Avengers episode "Look — (Stop Me If You've Heard This One) — But There Were These Two Fellers...", which features a pair of murderous clowns, was also an influence. The fatalities in Midway's Mortal Kombat pushed the development team to increase the game's graphic violence, with Pikulski responsible for many of the game's goriest effects. However, in response to objections from potential distributors, the development team installed a DIP switch that would allow operators to replace the giant infant boss character Junior with a giant teddy bear character named Deaddy. The opening and closing cutscenes were created by Blur Studio under the direction of Tim Miller. The music and sound effects were created by Kevin Quinn. Haeger voiced the game's opening narration as well as the characters Umlaut, Tökkentäkker, Hambone, and Krampus. The enemy character Muertito the Bat Boy was created and voiced by artist Martin Martinez.

In September 1998, CarnEvil was showcased at the Amusement & Music Operators Association Expo in Nashville, Tennessee. It was released on Halloween 1998, and it was considered a competitor to Atari Games's Area 51: Site 4 and Namco's Time Crisis II. In 1999, Midway confirmed that the game would not be ported to consoles.

== Reception and legacy ==
Mark Hain of Electronic Gaming Monthly praised the game's visuals and comfortable pump action gun, but was disappointed by the lack of extra gameplay features and hidden background secrets compared to Atari Games' Area 51 and Maximum Force. Jason Wilson and Tyrone Rodriguez of Tips & Tricks also praised the graphics, writing that "the stunning 3D environments are portrayed in such gruesome detail, you will think you're trapped in a horror film". French magazine Player One gave the game a score of 69%, regarding it as a House of the Dead clone, but commending the gun's design and precision as well as the gory graphics. Adam Bregman of LA Weekly proclaimed CarnEvil to be "undoubtedly the best of the genre" and "perhaps the most twisted video game ever created".

According to Haeger, the game's sales exceeded those of Mortal Kombat 4, which encouraged Midway's arcade team to conceptualize a 4D ride adaptation that ultimately never materialized. CarnEvil was never ported to home consoles despite the success of The House of the Dead, Time Crisis and Point Blank on those platforms. Pikulski claimed that a developer had intended to create an original home console game that bore the CarnEvil title. Bregman observed that by July 1999, the game had disappeared from most Los Angeles County arcades, which he attributed to the game's perverse presentation.

In September 2015, the fansite "Greely Valley Cemetery" was created as an archive for the game's concept sketches, promotional art, music tracks and voice clips. Lucas Sullivan of GamesRadar+ considered Killing Floor and its sequel to be spiritual successors to CarnEvil, and he saw a thematic influence on the "Loony Park" level in Painkiller's Battle Out of Hell expansion pack and Until Dawn: Rush of Blood.
