= The House of the Dead 2 =

1998 video game

- European arcade flyer
- Developer: Sega AM1
- Publisher: Sega
- Director: Takashi Oda
- Producer: Rikiya Nakagawa
- Composers: Tetsuya Kawauchi; Haruyoshi Tomita
- Series: The House of the Dead
- Platforms: Arcade, Dreamcast, Windows, Xbox, Wii
- Release: Arcade: JP: November 1998; NA: December 1998; EU: 1998; Dreamcast: JP: March 25, 1999; NA: September 9, 1999; EU: November 5, 1999; Windows: NA: July 6, 2001; Wii: NA: March 11, 2008; JP: March 19, 2008; AU: March 27, 2008; EU: March 28, 2008
- Genre: Light gun shooter
- Modes: Single-player, multiplayer
- Arcade system: Sega NAOMI

The House of the Dead 2 (Note: Japanese: ザ・ハウス・オブ・ザ・デッド2, Hepburn: Za Hausu obu za Deddo Tsū) is a 1998 light gun shooter video game developed by Sega AM1 and published by Sega for arcades on the Sega NAOMI system. It is the second installment of the House of the Dead series, and a direct sequel to the original House of the Dead, released in 1997. The story picks up slightly over a year after the original game, and follows several AMS agents investigating a zombie outbreak in Italy. The protagonists are tasked with finding the source of the attack while also locating a fellow missing agent known as G.

After a very successful release in arcades, the game was ported to the Dreamcast in 1999, followed by Microsoft Windows in 2001, the Xbox in 2002 as a bonus in The House of the Dead III, and the Wii in 2008 as part of the compilation The House of the Dead 2 & 3 Return. It would also serve as the basis for several spinoff games in the franchise, most notably The Typing of the Dead.

== Gameplay ==
The House of the Dead 2 is a rail shooter light gun game with an auto-reload feature that allows players to point their guns off-screen to reload their weapons without pulling the trigger. Players must shoot their way through hordes of zombies and other monsters while attempting to rescue civilians being attacked. Health is represented by torches at the bottom of the screen and are lost when the player is hit by an enemy or shoots a civilian. Bonus health can be awarded by rescuing civilians and finding first aid kits hidden in crates and barrels.

As in the first game, this game incorporates a branching path system that allows for a variety of different routes in each stage depending on the players actions (such as saving civilians). This is expanded upon with an even greater variety of alternate stage layouts and locations, although these do not affect the plot of the game. The player's actions could also influence the attack patterns of certain bosses.

The flashbacks to the first The House of the Dead in the game's introductory sequence were recorded using the game's engine.

The Dreamcast version introduced three additional gameplay modes. Original Mode allows players to collect items during gameplay and equip them in subsequent sessions, providing advantages such as enhanced weapons or additional health. Training Mode features a series of challenges designed to improve shooting accuracy and reaction times, while Boss Mode allows players to fight individual bosses in timed challenges. These modes were added alongside the original arcade experience.

== Plot ==
AMS Agent G's further investigation on the 1998 Curien Mansion incident leads to his mysterious disappearance upon his discovery of the remnants of Dr. Curien's operations in Venice, Italy, where a zombie outbreak takes place. The international government agency, AMS, sends American agents James Taylor, Gary Stewart, Harry Harris, and British agent Amy Crystal, to Italy in order to find G and evacuate the civilian populace.

On February 26, 2000, the agents arrive in Italy and soon encounter a massive undead horde, similar to the kind from 1998. James and Gary locate an injured G in a library, who provides them with a field journal containing information on the enemies. They continue on, trying to save the town's civilians in the process.

During the chaos, James and Gary face Judgment, consisting of the impish Zeal and his giant, headless, axe-wielding armored puppet, Kuarl. After defeating them, they meet up with Amy and Harry, who split up and plan to meet at Sunset Bridge. Upon meeting, the group faces the Hierophant, an amphibious monster which heads an assault on Venice's waterways and Central Plaza. After defeating it, the group takes a boat through the rivers.

It is revealed that Caleb Goldman, a wealthy businessman who financed Dr. Curien's creations leading to the 1998 incident, is now responsible for the new wave of zombies attacking the city. Goldman leaves a message on Amy's phone, inviting them to meet him at the Colosseum, which Harry fears to be a trap. James and Gary split up from the group again, and encounter five giant serpents known as the Tower. After killing them, they receive an emergency call from Amy, before getting cut off. The two quickly race to the Colosseum, only to discover Amy and a wounded Harry, injured by the Strength, a massive, chainsaw-wielding zombie, which James and Gary manage to kill. While Amy tends to Harry’s wounds, James and Gary drive to Goldman’s headquarters. Along the way, they battle Judgement, the Hierophant, and the Tower, who were revived by Goldman.

Upon arriving at Goldman's skyscraper, James and Gary are confronted by Curien's masterpiece, the Magician, revived by Goldman to oversee the birth of the Emperor, a shapeshifting crystalline entity designed to protect nature and destroy humanity. After defeating the Magician, they fight their way to the top of Goldman's Headquarters, eventually finding and confronting Goldman, who releases the Emperor. After one final battle, James and Gary defeat the Emperor. With his plans ruined and unable to escape, Goldman commits suicide by throwing himself off the roof of his building, though he warns the players that "in time, a successor will come".

Players are given different endings based on the following conditions:

- If a solo game was finished as either player 1 or 2
- If both players defeated the last boss
- Number of continues
- Points earned

In the good ending, James and Gary run into Thomas Rogan, the other main character from the first game, who tells them that G and Harry are all right, and that they should head off to their next battle "as long as they have the will to live" (in the case of James) or "as long as there is an answer" (in the case of Gary). In the normal ending, as James and Gary leave the building, they are greeted by G, Amy and Harry, as well as a large group of civilians, who thank them for their help. In the bad ending, James and Gary run into a zombified Goldman outside the building. As the screen goes white, a gunshot is heard.

== Development and release ==
The House of the Dead 2 was developed by Sega AM1 as the first game for Sega's NAOMI arcade hardware. Contemporary Japanese coverage announced the game for November 1998, highlighting the system's improved graphical capabilities and its ability to render more detailed environments and enemies. The game was also previewed by British magazine Computer and Video Games, which identified it as one of the first titles developed for Sega's Dreamcast-derived NAOMI arcade platform.

Before release, Sega promoted the sequel's expanded storyline, new protagonists and greater variety of zombie encounters. Japanese magazine Saturn Fan highlighted improvements to the original game's branching routes and civilian-rescue sequences, alongside new enemy designs and larger environments. The game began operating in Japanese arcades in November 1998.

The game's conversion to the Dreamcast was facilitated by the similarities between Sega's NAOMI arcade hardware and the home console. In a contemporary interview, Sega AM1 producer Rikiya Nakagawa explained that the shared architecture enabled the developers to bring the arcade game to the Dreamcast relatively quickly, while retaining much of its visual presentation. The conversion also provided an opportunity to introduce additional modes and features designed for home play.

In Japan, the Dreamcast version was released on 25 March 1999. Sega offered the game separately for ¥5,800 or bundled with the official Dreamcast Gun for ¥7,800. The light-gun controller featured a directional pad and a slot for the Dreamcast's Visual Memory Unit. The game was subsequently released in North America on 9 September 1999 as a launch title for the console in that region.

Following its Dreamcast release, The House of the Dead 2 was ported to Microsoft Windows in 2001. The game was subsequently included as unlockable bonus content in the 2002 Xbox release of The House of the Dead III, becoming accessible after completing the main game. In 2008, it was released for the Wii alongside The House of the Dead III as part of the compilation The House of the Dead 2 & 3 Return, which supported the Wii Remote and Wii Zapper.

== Remake ==
A remake of the game was announced on January 10, 2025. It was scheduled for release originally in Spring 2025, but was delayed until October 24, 2025 for Steam, GOG, Nintendo Switch, PlayStation 4, PlayStation 5, Xbox One and Xbox Series X/S. It was developed by MegaPixel Studio and published by Forever Entertainment. The remake received generally negative reviews, with many players citing the PC release as having been released in a broken and unplayable state.

== Reception and legacy ==
Reception

Aggregate score
Aggregator	Score	
Aggregator	Dreamcast	PC
GameRankings	77%	74%

Review scores
Publication	Score	
Publication	Dreamcast	PC
AllGame	4.5/5	3/5
Edge	7/10	N/A
Electronic Gaming Monthly	7.62/10	N/A
Famitsu	9/10, 8/10, 8/10, 8/10	N/A
Game Informer	8/10	N/A
GamePro	3/5	N/A
GameRevolution	B+	N/A
GameSpot	6.7/10	N/A
GameSpy	7/10	N/A
IGN	8.7/10	N/A
Next Generation	2/5	N/A

Award
Publication	Award
Game Informer	99th Top Game Of All Time

In Japan, Game Machine listed The House of the Dead 2 as the third most successful dedicated arcade game of December 1998. In Spain, the Dreamcast version bundled with the light gun was the platform's best-selling game through December 1, 1999, while the standalone release ranked ninth. The game remained commercially popular well after its release, returning to fourth place in a Centro Mail sales chart in December 2000 and topping the magazine's sales chart again in June 2001 following price reductions on Sega software.

According to NPD sales figures reproduced by Blast Processing!, the Dreamcast version of The House of the Dead 2 sold 339,721 copies in North America. In Japan, the game sold an estimated 234,756 copies, according to a compilation of Famitsu sales data.

The Dreamcast version received "favorable" reviews, while the PC version received "average" reviews according to the review aggregation website GameRankings.

AllGame gave the arcade version a score of four-and-a-half stars out of five. Four reviewer commented on the game in the Japanese magazine Famitsu. They found the game's graphics to be very high quality and that having multiple paths gave it replay value. IGN praised the same console version's detailed level design and varied enemy designs but criticized poor voice acting. GameSpot said of the same console version, "Just a gun that lines up with the sights doesn't seem too much to ask for." Game Informer ranked it at number 99 in its best games of all-time list in 2001. The staff praised it for its expansion of its predecessor's gore and intensity, but noted that the lack of a light gun accessory for the Dreamcast version was slightly disappointing.

Blake Fischer reviewed the Dreamcast version of the game for Next Generation, rating it two stars out of five, and stated that "Without the light gun, this game is a complete loss. With a gun, it's better, but not for very long." Reviewers in Famitsu noted on the games difficulty, even on lower difficulty modes and also said that using a controller for this kind of game proved to be awkward.

A consensus among reviewers was that the quality of the English voice acting was very poor, with one calling it "easily some of the worst in the genre". Others found it to be so bad that it became amusing. In 2020, The House of the Dead 2 was ranked as the best game in the series by Screen Rant.

== Legacy ==
The House of the Dead 2 served as the basis for several spin-off games. The Typing of the Dead (1999) reused its game engine but replaced light-gun shooting with typing words and phrases to defeat enemies. Originally released in arcades, the game was subsequently ported to the Dreamcast and PC. The Nintendo DS title English of the Dead (2008) adapted the game's setting and enemies into an educational game in which players defeated zombies by translating Japanese words into English. The Game Boy Advance game The Pinball of the Dead (2002) drew inspiration from the first two House of the Dead games, incorporating enemies, bosses and music from the second game into a pinball format.
