= The House of the Dead =

- Logo of the first game in the series. Each game starting from the third entry features a different logo and style.
- Genre: Light gun shooter
- Developers: Sega; Wow Entertainment
- Publisher: Sega
- Platform: List: Arcade, Sega Saturn, Windows, Dreamcast, PlayStation 2, Game Boy Advance, Xbox, Nintendo DS, Wii, PlayStation 3, mobile phone, Android, iOS, Nintendo Switch, PlayStation 4, Xbox One, PlayStation 5, Xbox Series X/S
- First release: The House of the Dead; March 1997
- Latest release: The House of the Dead 2 Remake; October 24, 2025

The House of the Dead is a video game franchise created by Sega, which began with the 1997 game of the same name. Many games in the series were originally released in arcades and utilize a light gun, but can be played with standard controllers on consoles and with a mouse or keyboard on home computers; for the PlayStation Network releases of III and 4, they can also be played using the PlayStation Move controller.

There are six House of the Dead games originating in a first-person light gun rail shooter format. The mainline entries all have common traits including special agents pairing up to take on hordes of biologically engineered undead (referred to as "creatures" in the wider series and as "mutants" in Overkill). The games are divided into chapters, each of which culminates in a boss battle against usually massive, terrifying creatures. The bosses in the first four games as well as the sixth are all named after the Major Arcana of occult tarot. Gameplay elements differ among the different games in the series, with each having different characters, firearms, and types of enemies. In many of the games, there are branching paths (determined by one's actions) and unlockable bonuses, along with different endings based on one's performances.

Several spin-offs from the mainstream storyline have also been produced, including a virtual pinball game, an English tutorial and a typing tutorial, as well as a film trilogy. In addition, select enemy characters appearing in the first two games were adapted into fully articulated action figures by Palisades Toys (which canceled the second toy line before release due to limited returns from the first series). Along with Capcom's Resident Evil, The House of the Dead has been credited with popularizing zombie video games as well as re-popularizing the zombie in mainstream popular culture from the late 1990s onwards, leading to renewed interest in zombie films during the 2000s.

== Gameplay ==
The core gameplay mechanic of games in The House of the Dead series is the on-rails shooting. The player must clear each area of enemies before advancing to the next area. The first two installments featured pistols, the third featured a shotgun, the fourth and Scarlet Dawn featured a submachine gun. Overkill features different firearms which can be changed to the players' liking. The instructions on the cabinets note that a head shot is the most effective way to kill zombies.

Successful clearing will result in boss battles. Before most battles, the game will show what the bosses' weak point is. Final bosses have no identifiable weak point. If the boss is shot enough times, it will recoil; otherwise, it will take one of the player's lives. In most of the games, the bosses are named after Major Arcana cards. They are also classified by 'types', which are shown as either a number or (more rarely) a Greek letter.

There are also some different branching paths in the games, that are usually accessed by shooting a door or an object and sometimes when a civilian is killed.

The first two The House of the Dead games featured civilians. If the player successfully rescued civilians from the zombies, the civilian would sometimes reward the player with an extra life. The fourth did not feature civilians. In the third game, occasionally the player's partner would get in trouble and the player would be rewarded if they saved the partner's life. Players can also obtain extra lives by shooting boxes, crates, vases and destructible scenery. Scarlet Dawn once again features the civilians from the first two games, alongside the partner rescue mechanics from the third game, alongside new mechanics such as weapon switching and quick time events.

All mainline games have multiple endings, depending on how well the player did in terms of civilians rescued, shooting percentage, score, and lives left. Every main game except the last one has a "bad" ending, usually involving one of the characters transforming into a zombie. In the first game, the character turning was Sophie Richards. 2 is Goldman, III is Daniel Curien and 4 is, once again, Goldman.

== Main series ==
Release timeline Main entries in bold
1997	**The House of the Dead**
1998	**The House of the Dead 2**
1999	The Typing of the Dead
1999	Zombie Revenge
2000
2001
2002	The Pinball of the Dead
2002	**The House of the Dead 3**
2003
2004
2005	**The House of the Dead 4**
2006	The House of the Dead 4 Special
2007	The Typing of the Dead 2
2008	English of the Dead
2009	The House of the Dead: Overkill
2009	The House of the Dead EX
2010
2011	The House of the Dead: Overkill: Extended Cut
2012
2013	The Typing of the Dead: Overkill
2014
2015
2016
2017
2018	**House of the Dead: Scarlet Dawn**
2019
2020
2021
2022	**The House of the Dead: Remake**
2023
2024
2025	**The House of the Dead 2: Remake**

=== The House of the Dead (1997–2022) ===
On December 18, 1998, the insane and disillusioned Dr. Curien plans to mobilize his armies of undead against the unsuspecting populace. AMS agents Thomas Rogan and "G" are dispatched to his mansion to stop Curien's evil plan and rescue Rogan's future wife, Sophie Richards.

=== The House of the Dead 2 (1998–2025) ===
On February 26, 2000, business magnate and scientist Caleb Goldman reveals himself to be the mastermind of the 1998 Curien Mansion case, having been responsible for financing Dr. Curien's project. Goldman initiates an undead outbreak on an unnamed Italian city while his "Emperor" project develops. AMS agents named Harry Harris, Amy Crystal, James Taylor and Gary Stewart are sent in order to stop Goldman.

=== The House of the Dead 3 (2002) ===
In the post-apocalyptic world of 2019, Thomas Rogan and his team of commandos conduct a botched raid on the EFI Research Facility in hopes of finding the source of the planet's collapse and its connection to the Dr. Curien case. Losing contact with him, his daughter, Lisa Rogan, and his former partner, "G", set out on a search and recover mission, unaware that what awaits them has ties to the distant past and the very genesis of the undead horde. They would cross paths with Daniel Curien, the scientist's son, who later teams up with Lisa to defeat his father's resurrected form, "Wheel of Fate", alongside many undead minions.

=== The House of the Dead 4 (2005) ===
In the year 2003, veteran AMS agent James Taylor (from The House of the Dead 2 Original Remake) returns to Europe, accompanied by newcomer Kate Green to investigate the Goldman Incident of 2000. Following a sudden earthquake, they are shocked to discover that the undead from three years prior have returned, seemingly unharmed, and locked in a lab, but they soon break out and wreak havoc once again. Intent on preventing a nuclear disaster, they must once again cross paths with the seemingly deceased Goldman.

==== The House of the Dead 4 Special (2006) ====
Set shortly after the end of The House of the Dead 4, AMS agent Kate Green joins forces with veteran AMS agent "G" in order to destroy the "source" of the outbreak.

=== House of the Dead: Scarlet Dawn (2018) ===
On January 14, 2018, Sega announced House of the Dead: Scarlet Dawn for arcades.

On December 6, 2006, three years after the events of The House of the Dead 4, Kate Green joins forces with Ryan Taylor - the brother of her late partner, James Taylor - on an undercover mission at a dinner event within Scarecrow Manor, until the mysterious evil manager unleashes his army of creatures upon the dinner guests, and soon the world.

==== House of the Dead: Reawakened (2026) ====
In September 2026, Sega Amusements announced a virtual reality arcade game titled House of the Dead: Reawakened.

=== Future ===
In September 2019, director Takashi Oda revealed during an interview with Sega Interactive that he wants to produce three more games for the series as well as a House of the Dead first-person shooter if there is enough demand.

== Spin-offs ==
=== The Typing of the Dead (1999) ===
The Typing of the Dead is a revision of The House of the Dead 2 that replaces the game's light guns with QWERTY keyboards. Enemies are defeated by quickly typing out words that appear on the screen, and introduces a variety of challenges. Although designed to improve typing skills, the game has been lauded by critics for its humor and originality. The game was released for arcades, Dreamcast and PC, while a revised version was released for the PlayStation 2 only in Japan.

=== Zombie Revenge (1999) ===
Zombie Revenge is a beat 'em up title that was released in arcades and the Dreamcast. After a zombie outbreak devastates the city, AMS agents Stick Breitling, Linda Rotta and Rikiya Busujima are sent to eliminate the threat using their guns, fists and a variety of other weapons, while uncovering the truth behind the mysterious Zed. The game makes numerous references to the series on which it is based, including the Curien Mansion from The House of the Dead serving as the final stage. Also, some of the zombie noises were recycled from the first House of the Dead game.

=== The Pinball of the Dead (2002) ===
The Pinball of the Dead is a pinball game released for the Game Boy Advance. Tables, bosses and enemy designs are derived from The House of the Dead 2.

=== The Typing of the Dead 2 (2007) ===
Similar to its predecessor, The Typing of the Dead 2 is a revision of The House of the Dead III while retaining the typing gameplay elements of the previous title. It was only released in Japan for the PC.

=== English of the Dead (2008) ===
Released in Japan exclusively for the Nintendo DS, the game is designed to help Japanese speakers improve their English language skills. Playing similar to the Typing of the Dead games, enemies are defeated when Japanese words shown on-screen are translated into English. The game makes use of the DS touch screen and speakers.

=== The House of the Dead: Overkill (2009) ===
In 1991 Agent G, on his first assignment, is sent to investigate mysterious disappearances in Louisiana and runs afoul with homicide detective Isaac Washington. They encounter hordes of mutants in Bayou County, forcing them to team up in order to survive, and find the outbreak linked to local sugar plantation owner Papa Caeser, whom Isaac is pursuing to avenge the death of his father. The pair chase him through numerous locales throughout Bayou County and unearth a far deeper conspiracy than they initially thought.

=== The House of the Dead EX (2009) ===
The House of the Dead EX is a more casual spin-off to the main games and adds a more humorous twist to the series. Players play either as Zobio or Zobiko, a pair of young zombies in love, who seek to escape from captivity. As opposed to the general gameplay of the series, EX's levels are made up of a series of minigames. Sections are split up into various paths, some of which use the lightgun, such as shooting apples, and others which use a foot pedal on the machine, such as stomping on spiders. The goal of each level is to fulfil a quota within the time limit, indicated by long hands reaching towards each other. It runs on the Lindbergh arcade system and is also the first game in the series to use a pedal. The game was slated for release in December 2008, but was released later in 2009.

=== The Typing of the Dead: Overkill (2013) ===
Released for PC via Steam, The Typing of the Dead: Overkill is the second sequel of the original spin-off game, The Typing of the Dead. Unlike previous installments, there is no arcade version of this game, though it does come with a mouse-based version of The House of the Dead: Overkill Extended Cut. Like its predecessors, the game replaces the usual rail-shooter gameplay with typing gameplay elements, this time with a modified The House of the Dead: Overkill engine.

=== Darts of the Dead (2017) ===
Darts of the Dead is an unreleased darts game themed around House of the Dead on the DARTSLIVE2 platform. The title was trademarked by SEGA in September 2017, and showcased on the DARTSLIVEvideo YouTube channel in October, but since then nothing has come of the title's release to the general public.

== Compilations ==
=== The House of the Dead 2 & 3 Return (2008) ===
The House of the Dead 2 & 3 Return is a re-release of The House of the Dead 2 and III for the Wii. It is largely the same as the originals, except for minor changes. A new melee attack can be used to defend oneself and the game is Wii Zapper compatible.

== Film adaptations ==
In 2003, the first film, directed by Uwe Boll and produced by Brightlight Pictures, was released. Given a limited theatrical release with the intent of becoming a cult film, it served as a loose prequel to the 1997 game, but received very poor reviews and little box office return.

In 2004, a sequel to the first film was greenlit but direct-to-DVD. The previous director was unable to direct the sequel, due to commitments to his other films, and Michael Hurst was chosen to take his place. The sequel is closer to its source, featuring AMS agents going to a school to stop a zombie outbreak from spreading. However, the film was also poorly received.

Another sequel was announced. Mindfire Entertainment co-founder Mark Altman has stated in discussions that "It's a completely different approach to the material than the first two films." It was also stated that it may not be called House of the Dead 3 as Sega wasn't releasing the latest installment on home consoles." Eventually, Mindfire Entertainment released Dead and Deader starring Dean Cain and the House of the Dead name was not attached.

In December 2016, Variety reported that Stories International and Circle of Confusion will produce a new House of the Dead film. In late October 2024, it was announced that a live-action adaptation of the horror video game franchise by Sega and Wow Entertainment was in development, with Paul W. S. Anderson directing, co-producing and writing the screenplay based on the third game. Principal photography was scheduled to begin in mid to late 2025. In February 2026, it was reported that Isabela Merced had signed on star in the film with Sega stating the film was a top priority in the wake of the success of their Sonic the Hedgehog films.

In December 2025, Uwe Boll revealed his plan to direct an unofficial sequel to his original 2003 adaptation, with it titled 23 Years Later: The Castle of the Dead. In May 2026, Jonathan Cherry and Ona Grauer, actors of the 2003 film were announced to appear in the film. In July 2026, Boll confirmed the project had been cancelled, due to him working on the sequel to his film Citizen Vigilante (2026).

== Legacy ==
=== Appearances in other games ===
- The House of the Dead appears as one of the mini-games in the EyeToy game, Sega Superstars, in which players move their body to attack zombies.
- The series is represented in Sega Superstars Tennis, where the mansion is a playable court and there is a minigame in which players must aim their shots to fend off a horde of oncoming zombies. In this game, the series is referred to as Curien Mansion instead of The House of the Dead because the series is banned in Germany.
- Again represented as Curien Mansion, the series is represented in Sonic & Sega All-Stars Racing with three race tracks, and the riders duo Zobio and Zobiko (only Zobio on the Nintendo DS) from The House of the Dead: EX. During their All-Star move, Zobio drinks a magic potion which makes him grow in size and he then slams his opponents with his strength while Zobiko rides him.
- A racetrack appears in Sonic & All-Stars Racing Transformed, with zombies and various monsters making appearances. Zobio and Zobiko make cameo appearances in the stage as well. Once again, the series is called Curien Mansion.
- Zombie Revenge's Rikiya Busujima appears in Project X Zone with references made to The House of the Dead.
- Dr. Curien, Agent G, Thomas Rogan, and Ebitan appeared as playable characters in the mobile RPG spinoff title SEGA Heroes.
  - SEGA Heroes is the only crossover/spinoff featuring The House of the Dead that does not refer to it as Curien Mansion.

=== Cultural impact ===
According to Kim Newman in the book Nightmare Movies (2011), the "zombie revival began in the Far East" during the late 1990s, largely inspired by the Japanese zombie games Resident Evil and The House of the Dead. The success of these two zombie games inspired a wave of Asian zombie films, such as Bio Zombie (1998) and Versus (2000), for example. The zombie revival which began in the Far East eventually went global following the worldwide success of Japanese zombie games such as Resident Evil and The House of the Dead. Their success led to a wave of Western zombie films during the 2000s, such as 28 Days Later (2002) and Shaun of the Dead (2004), for example. In 2013, George A. Romero said it was the video games Resident Evil and House of the Dead "more than anything else" that popularised his zombie concept in mainstream popular culture.

The House of the Dead has also been credited with introducing a new type of zombie distinct from Romero's classic slow zombie: the fast running zombie. After first appearing in The House of the Dead, they became popular in zombie films and video games during the 2000s, including the Resident Evil games and films, The House of the Dead film adaptation, and the films 28 Days Later (2002) and Dawn of the Dead (2004).

In Walt Disney Animation Studios' 52nd animated feature-length film, Wreck-It Ralph, hatchet-wielding zombie based on Cyril appears alongside numerous other video game villains in the villains' support group Bad-Anon. The zombie tries to reassure Wreck-It Ralph that labels won't make him happy and that good or bad, he must love himself for who he is.
