= Finny the Fish & the Seven Waters =

2004 video game

- Developer: Sega Wow (Note: Additional work by Sony Computer Entertainment Japan.)
- Publishers: JP: Sony Computer Entertainment; NA: Natsume Inc.
- Platform: PlayStation 2
- Release: JP: July 15, 2004; NA: May 17, 2005
- Genre: Action
- Mode: Single-player

Finny the Fish & the Seven Waters, known in Japan as Uo: Seven Waters and the Gods of Legend (Note: Japanese: うお 7つの水と伝説のヌシ, Hepburn: Uo Nanatsu no Mizu to Densetsu no Nushi), is an action-adventure video game developed by Sega Wow and published by Sony Computer Entertainment for the PlayStation 2. It was released in Japan in 2004 and by Natsume Inc. in North America in 2005. It was a collaborative effort between Sega and Sony Computer Entertainment.

== Gameplay ==
Finny the Fish & the Seven Waters is an action-adventure game where the player takes control of the titular fish Finny. Finny navigates through various bodies of water while collecting various items and solving puzzles. Enemies can be defeated by attacking them with bites or ramming, with small enemies ending up being eaten, though bait from fishermen will ensnare Finny when eaten.

== Reception ==
Reception

Aggregate score
Aggregator	Score
Metacritic	59/100

Review scores
Publication	Score
Edge	6/10
Famitsu	32/40
GameSpot	5.6/10
GameZone	7.3/10
IGN	5.3/10
Official U.S. PlayStation Magazine	2/5
PlayStation: The Official Magazine	5/10
Detroit Free Press	2/4

The game received "mixed" reviews according to the review aggregation website Metacritic. In Japan, however, Famitsu gave it a score of all four eights for a total of 32 out of 40.
