= The House of the Dead 2 & 3 Return =

2008 video game compilation

- North American box art
- Developers: Sega; H.I.C.
- Publisher: Sega
- Director: Emiko Sunaga
- Producer: Yojiro Ogawa
- Designers: Hiroshi Miyamoto; Kohei Takeda
- Artist: Kazuhiro Hidaka
- Composer: Hideki Abe
- Series: The House of the Dead
- Platform: Wii
- Release: NA: March 11, 2008; JP: March 19, 2008; AU: March 27, 2008; EU: March 28, 2008
- Genre: Rail shooter
- Modes: Single-player, multiplayer

The House of the Dead 2 & 3 Return is a compilation of the rail shooter games The House of the Dead 2 and The House of the Dead III, released for the Wii in 2008. The game utilizes the 1999 Dreamcast port for 2 and the 2003 Xbox port for III, and thus features both of the original games, along with the respective bonus content for each. It is compatible with the Wii Zapper peripheral.

== Gameplay ==
Aside from the arcade mode, The House of the Dead 2 also features an "original mode" which has unique features. At the beginning, players can select up to two upgraded items from their inventory before starting the game (which include a variety of new weapons, extra health and continues). These items are found throughout the game, gifted by rescued civilians or found hidden in breakable items such as crates. Once collected they are then stored in the player's inventory for future play throughs. It also includes a boss mode in which any defeated boss from the game can be battled individually. The House of the Dead 2 also has a training mode, a set of minigames designed to increase the player’s speed and accuracy.

The House of the Dead III features a bonus mode called time attack, in which health is replaced with time, encouraging the player to shoot faster and avoid damage as much as possible. The House of the Dead 3 also includes another unlock-able, 'extreme' game mode, with even tougher enemies and reduces the blast radius of the shotgun, although the weapon can now be used as an effective melee attack against enemies standing close by. The melee comes at the cost of the player needing to reload after using it.

== Reception ==
Reception

Aggregate scores
Aggregator	Score
GameRankings	65.97%
Metacritic	66/100

Review scores
Publication	Score
1Up.com	C+
Eurogamer	6/10
Game Informer	7.5/10
GameSpot	6/10
GameTrailers	5.4/10
GameZone	6/10
IGN	6/10
Nintendo Power	7/10
Nintendo World Report	8/10
VideoGamer.com	6/10
Digital Spy	3/5

The game was met with average to mixed reviews upon release. GameRankings gave it 65.97%, while Metacritic gave it 66 out of 100.

Nintendo Power gave the game 7 out of 10. They stated that the lack of extras was disappointing, but the game was praised and they felt that the price seemed quite reasonable. IGN gave the game 6 out of 10. They praised the IR functionality, saying it is one of the Wii's best, and the flawless port of The House of the Dead 2, but stated that The House of the Dead 3 suffers from some technical issues and criticized the lack of extras, stating that the price seems almost too high; however, they did state that the games are still great and fun to play and recommended the game to die-hard fans and anyone wanting a great lightgun game. GameSpot likewise gave it 6 out of 10, commenting that "The 'dogs of the AMS' make their move to the Wii in this fun but brief port of the on-rails arcade shooters."

== See also ==
- List of light gun games
