= House of the Dead: Scarlet Dawn =

2018 arcade video game

- Developer: Sega
- Publisher: Sega
- Director: Takashi Oda
- Producer: Masakatsu Watanabe
- Designer: Akito Konoki
- Composers: Keitaro Hanada; Hiroshi Kawaguchi; Ryohei Kono
- Series: The House of the Dead
- Engine: Unreal Engine 4
- Platform: Arcade
- Release: JP: September 13, 2018; US: October 2018
- Genre: Rail shooter
- Modes: Single player, multiplayer
- Arcade system: Sega ALLS

House of the Dead: Scarlet Dawn (Note: Japanese: ハウス・オブ・ザ・デッド ～スカーレットドーン～, Hepburn: Hausu obu za Deddo 〜 Sukāretto Dōn 〜) is a 2018 horror-themed rail shooter arcade game developed by Sega. It is the fifth mainline installment in The House of the Dead series, following the release of The House of the Dead 4 in 2005.

The game entered location testing on January 19–21, 2018 in Akihabara, Japan. It was released in all arcades of Japan on September 13, 2018, and was released in the United States through Dave & Buster's locations in October 2018. The game's release ended the franchise's nine-year hiatus of new installments, which began in 2009 with the initial Wii release of the spin-off/non-canon prequel The House of the Dead: Overkill.

== Plot ==
On December 6, 2006, three years after the events of The House of the Dead 4, AMS agent Kate Green joins forces with Ryan Taylor, the brother of her late partner and mentor, James, to infiltrate a dinner event held at Scarecrow Manor. The owner of the manor unleashes his army of mutant creatures upon the dinner guests. Kate and Ryan manage to escape as the main hall is set ablaze by the resurrected Chariot, a creature from the 1998 Curien Mansion Incident. They defeat Chariot but are forced to stay within the manor complex after the unmanned helicopter that was sent to rescue them has crashed.

Kate and Ryan explore the other parts of the estate, where they find clues that reveal that its owner, Thornheart, is connected to the late bioterrorists, Dr. Curien and Caleb Goldman. Kate explains that, in 1880, the trio's ancestors formed an organization that was the catalyst for prior incidents that the AMS investigated. At some point, Thornheart contracted a rare disease and was long believed dead, but survived. After Curien and Goldman's deaths, he began to develop his own project within Scarecrow Manor, code-named Noah's Ark.

As the duo discover a helicopter parked on the terrace, another resurrected creature from the 1998 incident, Hanged Man, corners them and destroys the vehicle, preventing any means of escape. After destroying Hanged Man, Kate and Ryan traverse the manor's underground tunnels and chambers where they discover a giant laboratory that also houses a squid-like creature named Priestess, which they defeat.

Soon, Kate and Ryan visit the manor's church and confront Thornheart, who states that the purpose of Noah's Ark is to bring forth "new [human] evolution" to the world. Thornheart releases The Moon, a tree-like behemoth with aerokinetic powers that absorbs other creatures to grow larger and stronger, who destroys the manor. Realizing this, Ryan stabs an iron rod through its head, causing lightning to strike the rod, killing it, which Kate believes was James intervening from the dead. With the threat neutralized, the two walk away as the sun rises.

=== Endings ===
As with previous entries in the series, the game has four endings based on the player's performance. Each ending concludes with the text "To be continued in the next HOUSE OF THE DEAD". Unlike the previous games, this is the only game where no ending involves a character transforming into a zombie.

- Thornheart walks among rows of incubation tanks and says "It's impossible to change a predefined future."
- In the church, Thornheart claims that the ordeal has only begun, smiling as the camera glitches out.
- Thornheart stands from his chair and leaves the church, cryptically stating that he saw out "the evolution of envy" and vows to follow up with "arrogance".
- Kate recalls James' motto to never lose hope and keep fighting to the end, before leaving Scarecrow Manor with Ryan.

=== Characters ===
- Ryan Taylor: James Taylor's brother who joins Kate to solve the Scarecrow Manor case.
- Kate Green: James Taylor's former partner who joins Ryan to solve the Scarecrow Manor case.
- Thornheart: The owner of Scarecrow Manor who unleashes his army of creatures upon the guests. He is revealed to be the "Mystery Man" previously seen from The House of the Dead III and The House of the Dead 4.

== Development ==
A sequel to The House of the Dead 4, tentatively titled The House of the Dead 5, was developed around 2012 but was shelved. Sega would not revisit the House of the Dead arcade series until 2018, at which point they felt that arcade technology had matured enough for a sequel. The new sequel, House of the Dead: Scarlet Dawn, was titled without a number to appeal to new players.

Scarlet Dawn was developed in Unreal Engine 4 for the PC-based Sega ALLS arcade hardware. The development of visual effects was outsourced to Agni-Flare, whose staff includes designers from The House of the Dead 4. Sega and Agni-Flare decided upon the idea of having the player battle an "avalanche" of creatures. The final game allows up to 200 enemies to appear on-screen at once.

Agni-Flare developed levels in modular blocks, generated base meshes with an in-house tool, and recycled animations from previous House of the Dead games to lower costs and memory use. Motion capture for the characters was recorded at Sega's motion capture facility in Japan. Several types of gore effects were explored, but were ultimately scrapped due to censorship.

Rather than taking notes, director Takashi Oda kept the structure of Scarlet Dawn's story in his mind. He wanted Thornheart to be a morally-gray antagonist in the manner of Dr. Kiriko from the manga Black Jack. Scarlet Dawn's bosses were created by The House of the Dead 4 designer Iwao Nobuto, though Chariot's final design was handled by Sega because he is a returning boss from the original 1996 game The House of the Dead.

== Release ==
House of the Dead: Scarlet Dawn was officially announced by SEGA Interactive on January 14th, 2018. Preliminary location tests were held at the SEGA Akihabara Building 3 in Tokyo, Japan from January 19th to the 21st; Round One Arcade in Yokohama from March 3rd to March 5th; and Rakuichi Rakuzen Arcade in Kawaguichi from March 16th to March 18th. Players were polled over interest in a console port of Scarlet Dawn. Off-screen gameplay footage of this incomplete build was uploaded to YouTube, which online publications then circulated. This build later appeared at the JAEPO 2018 amusement expo from February 9th - 11th, 2018, where Scarlet Dawn was showcased.

On July 9th 2018, a second build was location tested at High-tech Land Sega in Shibuya, Sega Tokyo Dome City, and Sega Shinjuku Kabukicho. Reportedly, this build had more content and balanced the difficulty.

A Western release was confirmed by Sega on May 31st, 2018. Kevin Bachus, the Senior Vice President of the American restaurant and video arcade chain Dave & Busters, announced that all locations would receive Scarlet Dawn cabinets that fall. The game was also distributed to all Round One arcade locations, including those in the United States. However, Sega stressed that Scarlet Dawn is not an exclusive release.

In September 2019, Sega and Universal Space announced an exclusive Chinese version of the game titled "Haunted House: Scarlet Dawn". While it features the same mechanics as the Global version, there are several changes, such as a tweaked UI and Chinese subtitles. A Korean version of the game was also spotted. An upright cabinet model was revealed by South Korean arcade developer Andamiro on January 30th, 2021. According to Arcade Heroes, a member of Sega Europe is unsure if this model will see a Western release and claimed that the game has some software differences. Another upright cabinet has been spotted in the United Kingdom, leading to speculation that it is being location tested by Sega.

== Reception ==
House of the Dead: Scarlet Dawn received mixed reviews from critics. The design of the arcade cabinet was largely cited as atmospheric and eye-catching. Wilcox Arcade felt the air blasters and vibrating seats were particularly effective. Gamerism also praised these features, but found the cabinet's sound mixing to be poor.

The graphics were generally praised for their high fidelity. SEGAbits lauded the inclusion of enemies and bosses from the original 1996 House of the Dead game. However, some critics lamented the lack of violence and felt that the human character animations were unimpressive.

The gameplay on the other hand drew mixed responses. Most critics enjoyed the larger enemy hordes and the added strategy of picking special weapons before each stage. Others took issue with the auto reload mechanic. Gamerism noted frame rate drops, which they felt added an unfair element to the game's difficulty. The lack of English subtitles was also criticized.

The boss fights were criticized for being overly scripted. Chris Plante of Polygon said that the fights "tend to make it a little too obvious that I'm just pointing a cursor where the game tells me until the health bar hits zero, or I trigger the special move that will deliver the fatal blow." Some critics felt that the final boss was anticlimactic.
