= The Typing of the Dead =

1999 video game

- The Typing of the Dead Box Art (original Japanese Dreamcast) Japanese Dreamcast cover art
- Developers: WOW Entertainment; Smilebit
- Publisher: Sega
- Director: Masamitsu Shiino
- Producers: Rikiya Nakagawa; Shun Arai
- Composer: Tetsuya Kawauchi
- Platforms: Arcade, Dreamcast, Windows, PlayStation 2, iOS
- Release: Arcade: JP: 1999; Dreamcast: JP: March 30, 2000; NA: January 23, 2001; Windows: JP: December 7, 2000; NA: September 23, 2001; PlayStation 2: JP: December 22, 2004; iOS: NA: May 10, 2012
- Genre: Educational
- Modes: Single-player, multiplayer
- Arcade system: Sega NAOMI

The Typing of the Dead (Note: Japanese: ザ・タイピング・オブ・ザ・デッド, Hepburn: Za Taipingu obu za Deddo) is an arcade game that was developed by WOW Entertainment and published by Sega for the NAOMI hardware. The game was released in Japanese arcades in 1999 and was ported to the Dreamcast in 2000 by Smilebit. A Windows version was released in 2000 and a PlayStation 2 port followed in 2004.

The Typing of the Dead is a modification of Sega's 1998 light gun arcade game The House of the Dead 2 in which the gun is replaced by a computer keyboard. The player takes the role of a secret agent in a zombie-infested Venice and must quickly type letters, words and phrases in order to kill fast-advancing enemies.

Despite falling under the criteria of "edutainment", the game was lauded by mainstream game critics for its humor, difficulty and originality. The PC version of The Typing of the Dead sold 120,000 units in 2003.

A PlayStation 2 port was called The Typing of the Dead: Zombie Panic. This version was released in Japan in late December 2004 and was packaged with a USB keyboard. The game was mostly unchanged, although the Dreamcast backpacks were replaced with PlayStation 2 backpacks and new minigames were incorporated into the main story. Two sequels, The Typing of the Dead 2 (based on The House of the Dead 3) and The Typing of the Dead: Overkill (based on The House of the Dead: Overkill), were released for PC in 2007 and 2013 respectively. English of the Dead, another revision of House of the Dead 2, was released as a language-learning game for the Nintendo DS in Japan in 2008. In 2012, an iOS remake was released entitled Flick of the Dead.

== Gameplay ==
A screen in which the player must type the names of flowers to kill zombies

The Typing of the Dead has been described variously as a remake or as a mod of the original The House of the Dead 2. It retains the original's first-person rail shooter style, but instead of shooting zombies and other enemies the player must type out words or phrases to kill them. The required word, sentence or phrase is displayed in a box that appears with the enemy. The phrases' length and complexity increase as the game progresses. Other features retained include the rescue challenges that alter the path the game takes to its final destination and the secrets and bonus items hidden throughout the game.

All levels contain specific challenge areas in which the player is required to kill a certain number of zombies in a limited time. These end with a boss battle that uses some altered form of usual gameplay, such as a long phrase or a question whose answer must be correctly typed. The console ports have "Original" and "Arcade" modes for the main storyline and "Tutorial," "Drill," and "Boss" modes for additional typing training. Most other changes are superficial, such as replacement of the weapons wielded by zombies with harmless items and equipping the AMS agents with keyboards attached to backpack Sega Dreamcasts with oversized batteries.

== Plot ==
The plot of the game closely follows that of House of the Dead 2. The story begins on February 26, 2000, when several AMS agents have been dispatched to investigate a zombie outbreak in Venice, Italy. The player can control two characters, James and Gary, who are sent to find the original game's "G" and then tasked with restoring order. Responsibility for the outbreaks is soon traced to "Goldman," a banking tycoon and scientist who attempts to end human control of the earth. Much of the game revolves around destroying Goldman's creations, concluding with the final boss of "the Emperor." One of three possible humorous ending sequences occurs, depending on the answers given to the questions asked to defeat the Emperor.

=== Endings ===
There are three possible endings:

- Explosion ending: The character defeats the Emperor, then sees Goldman committing suicide by falling off the building. An explosion is seen as Goldman hits the ground. This ending is achieved by typing honest answers to questions asked in the boss fight.
- Bungee ending: This is similar to the first, but a bungee cord can be seen attached to Goldman's leg. Goldman returns to where he was and belches. This ending is achieved by typing a combination of honest and untruthful or strange answers to questions asked in the boss fight.
- Superman ending: Also similar to the first, but as Goldman bids farewell to the player, he raises his hands and rises into the sky. This ending is achieved by typing untruthful answers to questions asked in the boss fight.

During the game's attract mode, it also includes a recap of the events in The House of the Dead.

== Releases ==
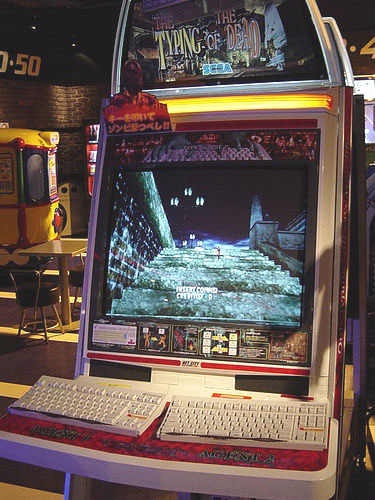
An original arcade cabinet of the game

The Typing of the Dead was originally released for arcades in Japan in 1999 with a special cabinet equipped with dual QWERTY keyboards. The game was one of the first developments by Smilebit, a team of Sega developers that had recently spun off as a new company.

The first home console release was for the Japanese Sega Dreamcast market on March 30, 2000. The North American release took place the following January. A PC port was produced by Empire Interactive and released in September 2001. A second PC release, Typing of the Dead 2003, featuring support for higher resolution and a "Kid's mode" featuring a new character with Japanese voice acting, was released in Japan only; several other Japanese-exclusive PC versions followed. The original PC version was made available on GameTap in October 2007.

== Reception ==
Reception

Aggregate score
Aggregator	Score	
Aggregator	Dreamcast	PC
Metacritic	83/100	75/100

Review scores
Publication	Score	
Publication	Dreamcast	PC
AllGame	3.5/5	4/5
Edge	7/10	7/10
Electronic Gaming Monthly	8.5/10, 7/10, 7/10	
Eurogamer		8/10
Famitsu	8/10, 9/10, 9/10, 9/10	
Game Informer	9/10	
GamePro	4/5	
GameRevolution	B	
GameSpot	8.7/10	7.5/10
GameSpy	8/10	78%
GameZone		8/10
IGN	9/10	8/10
PC Gamer (US)		69%

In Japan, Game Machine listed The Typing of the Dead on their March 15, 2000 issue as being the fourth most-successful dedicated arcade game of the month.

The Typing of the Dead was regarded overall by critics as an enjoyable game, receiving "favorable" reviews on both platforms according to the review aggregation website Metacritic. It was nominated for GameSpot's annual "Most Innovative" prize among console games, which went to Grand Theft Auto III.

In Japan, Famitsu gave the Dreamcast version a score of 35 out of 40. Reviewers appreciated the absurdist humor of the game's format, especially in the unusual phrases the game generates during later levels. The sub-par voice acting of the original House of the Dead 2 was considered to enhance this aspect of the game.

The quality of the graphics was criticized to varying degrees, as they had not been updated from the original House of the Dead 2 arcade version. PC World was so unimpressed with the game's premise that they listed it as a runner up on a "Top Ten Worst Games" list.

Game Informer has named the game the weirdest of all time.
