= Light-gun shooter =

Shooter video game genre

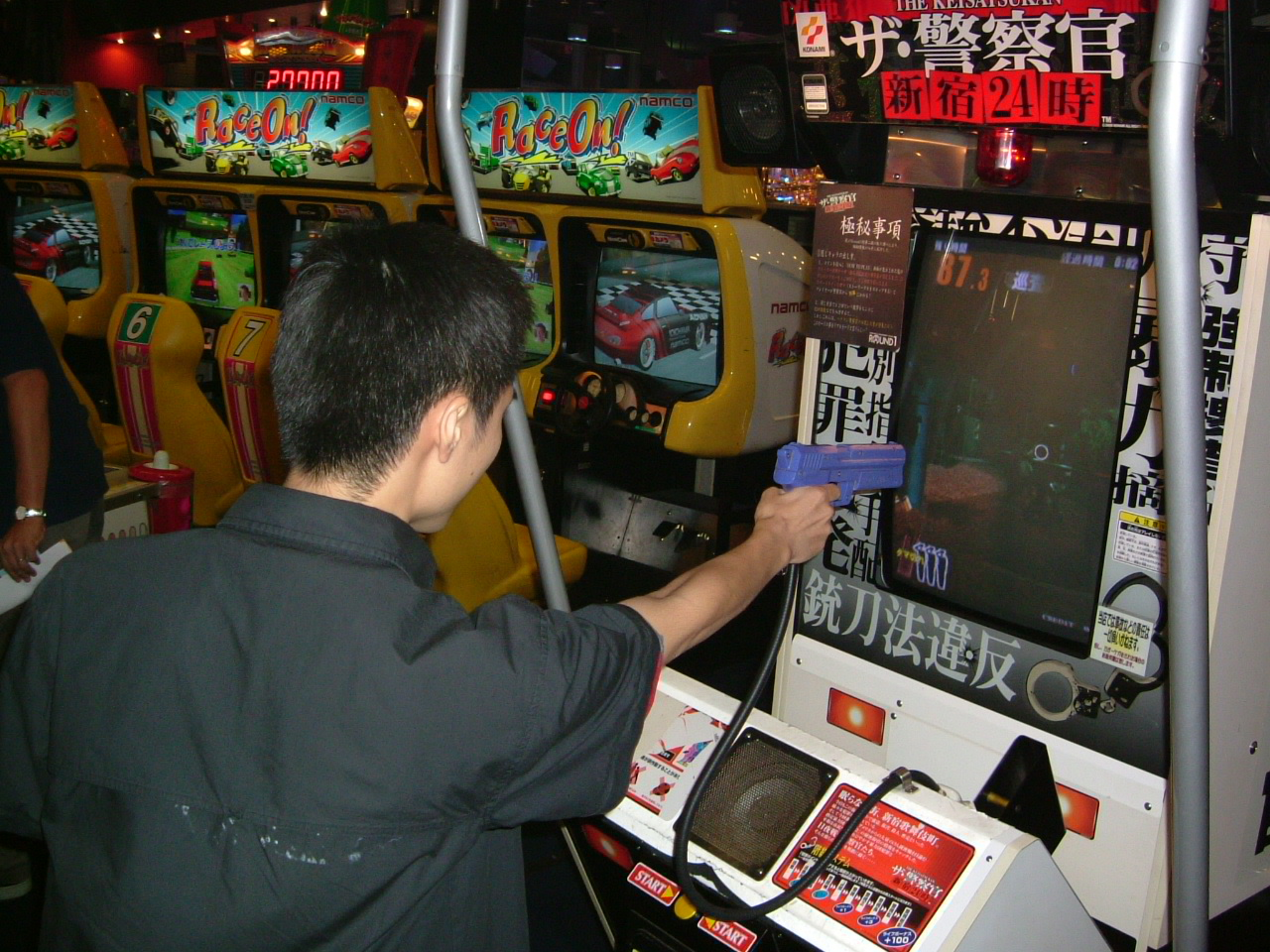
Man playing a light gun shooter game in an arcade

Light-gun shooter, also called light-gun game or simply gun game, is a shooter video game genre in which the primary design element is to simulate a shooting gallery by having the player aiming and discharging a gun-shaped controller at a screen. Light-gun shooters revolve around the protagonist shooting virtual targets, either antagonists or inanimate objects, and generally feature action or horror themes and some may employ a humorous, parodic treatment of these conventions. These games typically feature "on-rails" movement, which gives the player control only over aiming; the protagonist's other movements are determined by the game. Games featuring this device are sometimes termed "rail shooters", though this term is also applied to games of other genres in which "on-rails" movement is a feature. Some, particularly later, games give the player greater control over movement and in still others the protagonist does not move at all. On home computer conversions of light-gun shooters, mouse has been often an optional or non-optional replacement for a light gun.

Light-gun shooters typically employ "light gun" controllers, so named because they function through the use of light sensors. However, not all "light-gun shooters" use optical light guns, but some may also use alternative pointing devices such as positional guns or motion controllers. Mechanical games using light guns had existed since the 1930s, though they operated differently from those used in video games. Throughout the 1970s mechanical games were replaced by electronic video games and in the 1980s popular light-gun shooters such as Duck Hunt emerged. The genre was most popular in the 1990s, subsequent to the release of Virtua Cop, the formula of which was later improved upon by Time Crisis. The genre is less popular in the new millennium, as well as being hampered by compatibility issues, but retains a niche appeal for fans of "old school" gameplay.

== Definition ==
"Light-gun shooters", "light-gun games" or "gun games" are games in which the player shoots at targets, whether enemies or objects, and which use a gun-shaped controller (termed a "light gun") with which the player aims. While light-gun games may feature a first-person perspective, they are distinct from first-person shooters, which use more conventional input devices. Light-gun games which feature "on-rails" movement are sometimes termed "rail shooters", though this term is also applied to other types of shooters featuring similar movement. The light gun itself is so termed because it functions through the use of a light sensor: pulling the trigger allows it to detect light from the on-screen targets.

== Design ==
Duck Hunt. The game is viewed through the eyes of the protagonist; the player is using a light gun controller to target an on-screen duck.

Targets in light-gun shooters may be threatening antagonists such as criminals, terrorists or zombies, or they may be inanimate objects such as apples or bottles. Although these games may be played without a light gun, the use of more conventional input methods has been deemed inferior. Light-gun shooters typically feature generic action or horror themes, though some later games employ more humorous, self-referential styles.

Light-gun shooters primarily revolve around shooting large numbers of enemies attacking in waves. The protagonist may be required to defend themself by taking cover, or by shooting incoming thrown weapons, such as axes or grenades. The player may also compete against the clock, however, with some games also featuring boss battles. Games may also reward the player for accurate shooting, with extra points, power-ups or secrets. Games which do not pit the player against antagonists instead feature elaborate challenges constructed mainly from inanimate objects, testing the player's speed and accuracy. More conventional games may feature these types of challenges as minigames.

Light-gun shooters typically feature "on-rails" movement, which gives the player no control over the direction the protagonist moves in; the player only has control over aiming and shooting. Some games, however, may allow the protagonist to take cover at the push of a button. Other games may eschew on-rails movement altogether and allow the player to move the protagonist freely around the game's environment; still others may feature a static environment. Light-gun shooters use a first-person perspective for aiming, though some games may allow the player to switch to a third person perspective in order to maneuver the protagonist.

== History ==
=== Mechanical and electro-mechanical precursors (1900s to early 1970s) ===
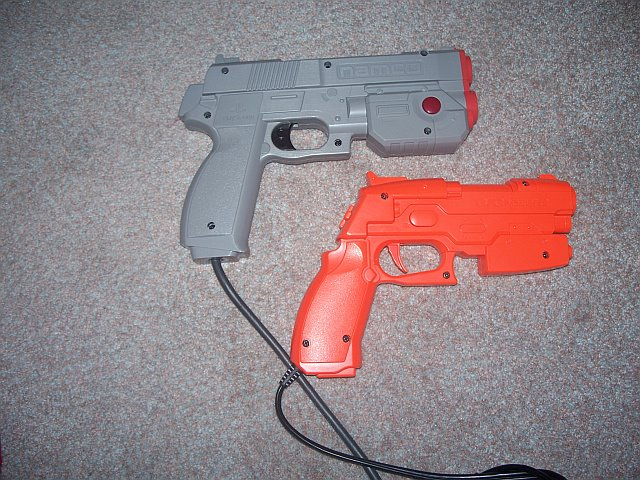
Popular GunCon light guns. The bright orange illustrates the toy-like appearance of most light guns, whereas the grey example appears more realistic.

Gun games had existed in arcades before the emergence of electronic video games. Shooting gallery carnival games date back to the late 19th century. Mechanical gun games first appeared in British amusement arcades around the turn of the 20th century, and before appearing in America by the 1920s. The British "cinematic shooting gallery" game Life Targets (1912) was a mechanical interactive film game where players shot at a cinema screen displaying film footage of targets.

The first light guns appeared in the 1930s, with the Seeburg Ray-O-Lite. Games using this toy rifle were mechanical and the rifle fired beams of light at targets wired with sensors. A later gun game from Seeburg Corporation, Shoot the Bear (1949), introduced the use of mechanical sound effects. By the 1960s, mechanical gun games had evolved into shooting electro-mechanical games. A popular sophisticated example was Periscope (1965) by Namco and Sega, with other examples including Captain Kid Rifle (1966) by Midway Manufacturing and Arctic Gun (1967) by Williams. The use of a mounted gun dates back to a Midway mechanical game in the 1960s.

Between the late 1960s and early 1970s, Sega produced gun games which resemble first-person light-gun shooter video games, but were in fact electro-mechanical games that used rear image projection in a manner similar to a zoetrope to produce moving animations on a screen. It was a fresh approach to gun games that Sega introduced with Duck Hunt, which began location testing in 1968 and released in January 1969. It had animated moving targets which disappear from the screen when shot, solid-state electronic sound effects, and a higher score for head shots. It also printed out the player's score on a ticket, and the sound effects were volume controllable.

=== 2D and pseudo-3D light-gun shooter video games (1970s to mid-1990s) ===
Throughout the 1970s, electro-mechanical arcade games were gradually replaced by electronic video games, following the release of Pong in 1972, with 1978's Space Invaders dealing a yet more powerful blow to the popularity of electro-mechanical games. In the 1970s, EM gun games evolved into light-gun shooter video games. Light guns used in electronic video games work in the opposite manner to their mechanical counterparts: the sensor is in the gun and pulling the trigger allows it to receive light from the on-screen targets.

Computer light pens had been used for practical purposes at MIT in the early 1960s. The Magnavox Odyssey home video game console in 1972 had a light gun accessory, in the production of which Nintendo was involved. In the arcades, light-gun shooter video games appeared in 1974, with Sega's Balloon Gun in August and Atari's Qwak! in November. However, light-gun video games were not able to achieve the same level of success as their earlier electro-mechanical predecessors until the mid-1980s.

Light-gun video games became popular in arcades with the Nintendo VS. System arcade releases of Duck Hunt (1984) and Hogan's Alley (1984), with Duck Hunt also becoming popular on home consoles following its 1985 Nintendo Entertainment System (NES) release. Light guns subsequently became popularly used for video games in the mid-1980s. In the late 1980s, Taito's arcade hit Operation Wolf (1987) popularized military-themed light-gun rail shooters. In 1989, Bandai created Space Shadow with a companion light gun known as the Hyper Shot, a light gun that resembles a submachine gun with built-in speakers for player immersion.

Operation Wolf had scrolling backgrounds, which Taito's sequel Operation Thunderbolt (1988) and Sega's Line of Fire (1989) took further with pseudo-3D backgrounds, the latter rendered using Sega Super Scaler arcade technology, with both featuring two-player co-op gameplay. SNK's Beast Busters (1989) supported up to three players and was a modest success. Midway's arcade hit Terminator 2: Judgment Day (1991) combined Operation Wolf's scrolling with Operation Thunderbolt and Line of Fire's two-player co-op along with the use of the use of realistic digitized sprite graphics.

In 1992, Konami's Lethal Enforcers further popularized the use of realistic digitized sprite graphics in light-gun shooters, with digitized sprites remaining popular in the genre up until the mid-1990s. Midway's Revolution X (1994) was a Three-player co-op game with digitized graphics like their earlier hit Terminator 2. In 1995, Konami released Crypt Killer (Henry Explorers in Japan), which supported up to three players and was a modest success.

=== 3D light-gun shooters (mid-1990s to 2000s) ===
Sega's Virtua Cop, released in arcades in 1994, broke new ground, popularized the use of 3D polygons in shooter games, and led to a "Renaissance" in the popularity of arcade gun games. Like Lethal Enforcers, the game was inspired by the Clint Eastwood film Dirty Harry as well as a coffee advertisement in which a can of coffee grew larger in a gun's sights. In Virtua Cop the player had to shoot approaching targets as fast as possible.

The acclaimed Time Crisis by Namco, released for Japanese arcades in 1995 and ported to Sony's PlayStation console in 1996/1997, introduced innovations such as simulated recoil and a foot pedal which had to be depressed in order to attack and, when released, caused the protagonist to take cover. The game's light gun controller, the GunCon, was also acclaimed. Namco also released Gun Bullet for Japanese arcades in 1994 and was ported as Point Blank for the PlayStation in 1998, a 2D sprite-based game featuring a unique minigame structure and quirky, humorous tone. The game was critically acclaimed and received two sequels, both for the arcades and the PlayStation console.

In 1995, Atari Games released the successful Area 51 arcade light-gun game, which featured red and blue HAPP 45. caliber pistol-like light guns and the use of full-motion video (FMV) pre-rendered graphics. Some games attempted to incorporate elements of first-person shooter (FPS) or survival horror games through the use of less restricted character movement or exploration, with varying degrees of success.

Between 1996 and 1997, 3D light-gun shooters gained considerable popularity in arcades. Popular arcade light-gun shooters at the time included Sega's Virtua Cop 2 (1995) and The House of the Dead (1997), Namco's Time Crisis, and Police Trainer (1996). The most successful light-gun horror game series is The House of the Dead (1997 debut), the popularity of which, along with Resident Evil, led to zombies becoming mainstream again in popular culture. In 1998, Midway released their third successful light-gun game called CarnEvil, which featured over-the-top black comedy humor, the use of the shotgun-like light gun which pumps to reload, and the use of blood and gore like Mortal Kombat.

Light guns were suppressed for a time in the United States after the 1999 Columbine High School massacre and its attendant controversy over video games and gun crime. Since the late 1980s, light gun controllers have been generally manufactured to look like toys by painting them in bright colours. In Japan, which lacks the gun crime found in the United States and in which civilians cannot legally own guns, more realistic light guns are widely available. Light-gun rail shooters began declining in the late 1990s as FPS games became more popular. Light-gun shooters became less popular in the 2000s, with new games in the genre seen as "old school", such as Raw Thrills' Target: Terror (2004) and ICE/Play Mechanix's Johnny Nero Action Hero (2004).

=== Wii revival (2006 to 2014) ===
The genre went dormant for a period, but experienced a small renaissance with the release of the Nintendo Wii in 2006. The system's controller, named the Wii Remote, popularized motion-based gameplay. With the release of the Wii Zapper and third party light gun shells, various developers took the opportunity to release various light gun games on the platform, including Ghost Squad: Evolution, Gunslingers, Dead Space: Extraction, The House of the Dead 2 & 3 Return, The House of the Dead: Overkill, Resident Evil: The Darkside Chronicles, Resident Evil: The Umbrella Chronicles and Wild West Guns.

Sony responded by releasing the PlayStation Move, a motion-based controller for the PlayStation 3 that could also be fitted into a light gun shell called a PS Move Sharp Shooter. This accessory allowed developers to also release light gun games on Sony's platform. Additionally, Namco released the GunCon 3 for the PlayStation 3, which was supported by Time Crisis 4, Time Crisis: Razing Storm and Deadstorm Pirates.

The Time Crisis and House of the Dead franchises continued to receive acclaimed installments, with the arcade machine for the latter's House of the Dead 4 Special featuring large screens enclosing the player, as well as swivelling, vibrating chairs. Incredible Technologies/Play Mechanix released Big Buck Hunter, which was highly successful and spawned a number of sequels and console ports. Sega released Ghost Squad in 2004, notable for featuring unique machine guns with realistic recoil and an additional trigger for other in-game actions.

The light gun shooter genre fell out of popularity on home consoles when the industry transitioned from the Wii and PlayStation 3 to Wii U and PlayStation 4 in 2014. Other factors which contributed to this declining popularity included incompatibility with modern high-definition televisions.

=== VR revival, arcade and PC emulation (2014 to present) ===
The light gun genre is maintained in virtual reality, arcade and PC emulation.

Various VR games with light gun gameplay elements are released regularly after the release of Oculus Rift in 2016, such as Space Pirate Trainer, Operation Wolf Returns: First Mission, Zombieland VR, Blood & Truth, Under Cover and more.

Despite the decline of the arcade industry, arcade continues to see periodical exclusive light gun releases such as Jurassic Park Arcade and Time Crisis 5 in 2015, Point Blank X in 2016, House of the Dead: Scarlet Dawn in 2018, Elevator Action Invasion in 2021 and Enter the Gungeon House of the Gundead in 2023.

On PC, various companies offer light gun hardware solutions for light gun enthusiasts, such as Sinden Light Gun, Ultimarc Aimtrak and Retroshooter, in addition to retrofitting classic light gun hardwares for consoles such as Wiimote with Mayflash Dolphinbar and Gun4IR. Besides emulating classic light gun games, players can also find modern light gun releases on Steam, such as Railbreak, BangBang PewPew, BioCrisis and Blue Estate The Game.

The Joy-Con of the Nintendo Switch have been used as a light gun substitute for various games, such as The House of the Dead: Remake (2022), though they are less precise than the Wii Remote due to their sole reliance on gyroscopic sensors for aiming.

On June 6, 2025, Bandai Namco was supporting Tassei Denki in creating the G’AIM’E, a light gun that can be used on modern TVs with built-in games like Time Crisis, Point Blank and Steel Gunner.

== See also ==
- List of light-gun games
