= Sega AM1 =

Japanese development team within Sega

Sega AM Research & Development No. 1
- R&D1 logo
- Native name: セガ第一AM研究開発本部
- Romanized name: Sega Daiichi Ē Emu Kenkyū Kaihatsu Bu
- Formerly: Sega Research & Development #1 (1984-1990); Sega AM1 (1992-1999); Sega Software R&D Dept #1 (AM1) (1999-2000); Wow Entertainment, Inc. (2000-2003); Sega Wow, Inc. (2003-2004)
- Type: Division
- Industry: Video games
- Predecessor: Overworks
- Headquarters: Japan
- Key people: Rikiya Nakagawa; Noriyoshi Ohba; Kazunori Tsukamoto; Yasuhiro Nishiyama
- Products: Arcade games, video games, mobile games
- Parent: Sega

Sega AM Research & Development No. 1 (Note: Japanese: セガ第一AM研究開発本部, Hepburn: Sega Daiichi Ē Emu Kenkyū Kaihatsu Bu) is a development department within Japanese video game company Sega Corporation that also previously existed as Wow Entertainment and Sega Wow Inc. (Note: Japanese: 株式会社セガワウ, Hepburn: Kabushiki gaisha Sega Wau) AM1 spent most of its early existence under the leadership of Rikiya Nakagawa and developed a number of arcade games for Sega.

In 2000, Sega split its development studios into nine semi-autonomous companies, with AM1 becoming Wow Entertainment. Wow developed games for the Dreamcast and later other consoles as well as arcade games. In 2003, as part of studio consolidations within Sega, Wow was merged with Overworks Ltd. (Note: Japanese: 株式会社オーバーワークス, Hepburn: Kabushiki gaisha Ōbāwākusu) (originally titled Sega CS Research & Development No. 2 (Note: Japanese: セガ第二CS研究開発部, Hepburn: Sega Daini Shī Esu Kenkyū Kaihatsu Bu) and later AM7) and renamed to Sega Wow. Nakagawa resigned a few weeks later after Sammy Corporation acquired a significant amount of shares in Sega. Sega Wow was re-integrated back into the company the next year. Since then, the AM1 division has continued within Sega.

== History ==
Rikiya Nakagawa joined Sega as a programmer in 1983. While working for Sega's development division, he programmed arcade games including Hang-On, Ninja Princess, Alien Syndrome and Choplifter. Although the exact date of the transition is not known, some time after the release of Power Drift, Sega began to separate the amusement division into the Amusement Machine Research and Development teams, or AM teams. AM1 was formed not long after the decision was made to separate the teams. Hisao Oguchi worked with AM1 before later going to AM3.

Nakagawa was made manager of AM1 in September 1991. According to Nakagawa, he was working with AM2 with Yu Suzuki before being made head of AM1. He has also stated that his job focus had to change upon taking the new title, with less coding and more production and schedule management. Joining him at AM1 were members of Team Shinobi, who had developed Alien Syndrome and the arcade version of Golden Axe. AM1 also included Makoto Uchida, the lead developer for Golden Axe, who had also developed Altered Beast, as well as several other Sega arcade titles.

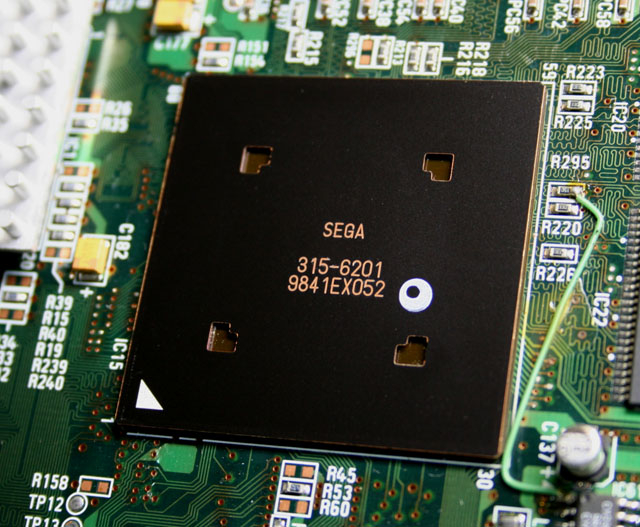
AM1 had involvement with technical aspects of the NAOMI arcade system board (PowerVR2 chip on the NAOMI board pictured).

During the next few years, AM1 made several technological advances in their game development. The team used 3D computer graphics for the first time in 1994's Wing War, a game that would also be released for Sega's R360 arcade cabinet. AM1 would also develop Indy 500, which Nakagawa called his most memorable AM1 project and he credits it for AM1's ability to develop proper 3D games. From there, AM1 developed WaveRunner and The House of the Dead. AM1 also collaborated with Sega Technical Institute to develop and release Die Hard Arcade in 1996. According to developer Koichi Izumi, who had worked with AM1 before moving to AM3, AM1 had developed so many games that he lost count of them. Nakagawa has stated that he considered it good that AM1 did not have a specialty area and could develop almost any game as long as it was fun, and highlighted Wakuwaku Anpanman, a kiddie ride, as an example. AM1 also took charge of technical aspects of the NAOMI arcade system board. Some of AM1's other titles developed were Sega Bass Fishing, Sega Strike Fighter and Wild Riders.

In April 2000, Sega restructured its arcade and console development teams into nine semi-autonomous studios headed by the company's top designers. Sega's design houses were encouraged to experiment and benefited from a relatively lax approval process. Nakagawa chose the name Wow Entertainment for his new company, because it was an easy name to say in Japanese and also would work worldwide as a word in the English dictionary. At the time, Wow Entertainment had a staff of 120 and had 12 to 13 production lines, one of which was based in the United States. Though AM1 had previously focused on arcade games, Wow would split its time with console games as well. Wow also announced a collaboration with Nihon Television and Kodansha for the development of additional games.

Wow's offices were based in Shibuya, Tokyo, Japan. In addition to Dreamcast games, such as Sega Bass Fishing 2, Wow developed for other consoles. The Game Boy Advance received Columns Crown, and games were developed for the GameCube, as well as the Xbox and PlayStation 2. Arcade games, such as The House of the Dead III, were also released.

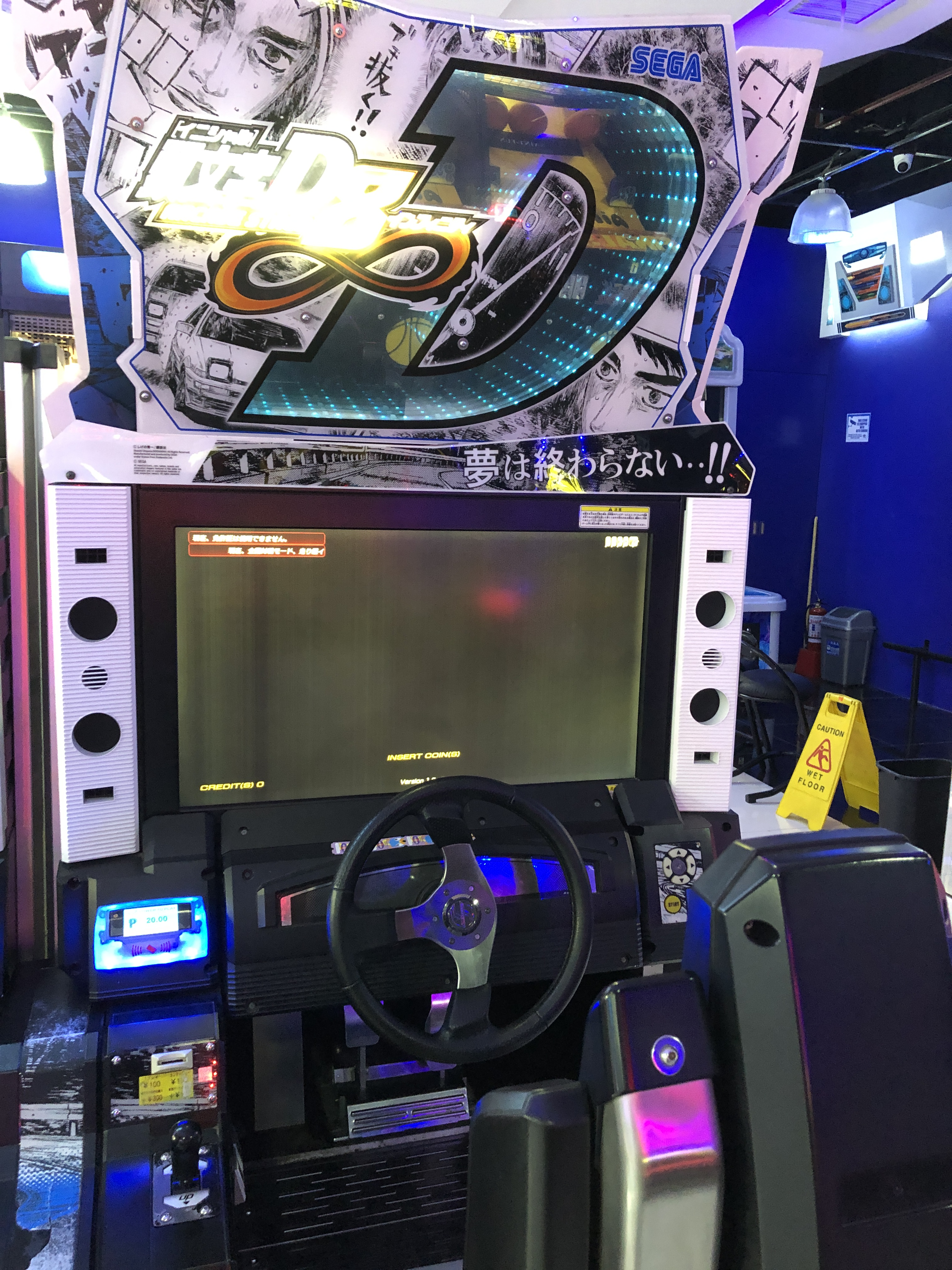
Initial D Arcade Stage 8 Infinity, developed by AM1

In 2003, Hisao Oguchi was named president of Sega. He announced his intention to consolidate Sega's studios into "four or five core operations". As part of the mergers, Wow Entertainment merged with Overworks, formerly Sega's AM7 department and headed by Noriyoshi Ohba. With this merger, completed in October 2003, Wow Entertainment changed its name to Sega Wow. Also in 2003, Sammy Corporation purchased a large share of Sega and announced its desire to have Sega focus on arcade game development, preferably with Sammy's Atomiswave arcade system board, which was less expensive and less advanced than Sega's Chihiro and Triforce boards. Nakagawa resigned weeks after the acquisition. While no official reason for his departure was given, it has been suggested that Nakagawa's resignation could have been due to a desire not to comply with Sammy's demands. Nakagawa joined Sammy itself as a general manager at the start of 2004, and as of 2008, was then president of the company Paon DP. Kazunori Tsukamoto, who had worked on The House of the Dead and Super GT, replaced Nakagawa as president of Sega Wow. As Sega Wow, they developed Finny the Fish & the Seven Waters with Sony Computer Entertainment, Blood Will Tell and the 2005 Altered Beast game. During the existence of Sega Wow, producer Yosuke Okunari pitched remakes of Streets of Rage and Dragon Force made by Sega Wow for the Sega Ages 2500 series. Ultimately, only Dragon Force eventually became an outsourced project, with Okunari helming the project and the Sega Ages 2500 series as a whole.

During mid-2004, Sammy bought a controlling share in Sega at a cost of $1.1 billion, creating the new company Sega Sammy Holdings, an entertainment conglomerate. Prior to the acquisition by Sammy, Sega began the process of re-integrating its subsidiaries into the main company, which was completed by October 2004. Sega Wow's 215 employees were split across consumer and arcade development after the integration back into Sega.

The AM1 division has continued within Sega since the re-integration of Sega Wow. Some of AM1's arcade developments since 2004 include video games Maimai, Initial D Arcade Stage 8 Infinity and Puyopuyo!! Quest Arcade, medal games Fist of the North Star: Battle Medal, and Starhorse III, as well as Sangokushi Taisen, a digital collectible card and trading card game. Over 500 million trading cards of Sangokushi Taisen have been shipped. AM1 also developed smartphone games, such as Chain Chronicle. In 2013, it was said to be the broadest division of Sega covering arcade video games, smartphone apps, games for kids, medal games, and simulators, or unique products such as the Sega Toylet. During the late 2000s and mid to late 2010s, Yasuhiro Nishiyama was the head of AM1, producing aforementioned games. He joined the company in 1997 and was involved with the hardware of the Dreamcast, and after almost three decades left Sega in 2024 to establish the company Sugorocks to pursue Web3, AI and Blockchain endeavours.

== Overworks ==
Overworks' logo

Overworks was a development division of Sega, originally founded as CS Research and Development #2. It was led by Noriyoshi Ohba, who was initially hired to Sega's CS2 department as a planner and worked on titles such as Wonder Boy in Monster Land and Clockwork Knight. Rieko Kodama was a developer on the team, which was formed of developers who had previously worked on series such as Shinobi, Streets of Rage, Phantasy Star and Alex Kidd. CS2 R&D had a hand in the development of Sega Saturn games, including Sakura Wars, Deep Fear and J-League Pro Soccer. The team would later be known as R&D #7 or AM7. Upon the transition of the studios that led to the formation of Overworks from AM7, Ohba chose the name "Overworks" as a simplification of "Over Quality Works". Games released for the Dreamcast as Overworks include Skies of Arcadia, Sakura Wars 3: Is Paris Burning?, and GuruGuru Onsen. They also released a game for arcades called Dragon Treasure. After the discontinuation of the Dreamcast, Overworks continued to work on Sakura Wars 4: Fall in Love, Maidens and a sequel to Shinobi, before being consolidated into Wow Entertainment. After serving as vice president of Sega Wow, Ohba departed Sega in 2004 to join Interchannel. The CS2 designation would later be given to Sonic Team by 2010. The developers of the games Guru Guru Onsen and Dragon Treasure, went on to develop Sangokushi Taisen at AM1. Meanwhile, members of the Skies of Arcadia team went on to be involved in Valkyria Chronicles and 7th Dragon which were developed at CS3.

== See also ==
- Sega development studios
- Amusement Vision
- Smilebit
- United Game Artists
