= List of Resident Evil media =

Resident Evil (Biohazard in Japan) is a Japanese multimedia horror franchise owned by the video game company Capcom. The franchise was created in 1996 with Resident Evil, a survival horror video game developed and published by Capcom for the PlayStation console. The game's critical and commercial success drove Capcom to continue developing the series. Due to Resident Evil's extended success, Capcom licensed more media based on the franchise including live action and animated films, novels, and comics.

== Video games ==
=== Major releases ===
==== Original ====
Game	Details
Resident Evil Original release dates: JP: March 22, 1996; NA: March 30, 1996; PAL: August 1, 1996	Release years by system: 1996 - PlayStation; 1996 - Microsoft Windows; 1997 - PlayStation (Director's Cut); 1997 - Sega Saturn; 1998 - PlayStation (Director's Cut Dual Shock Ver.); 2006 - Nintendo DS (Resident Evil: Deadly Silence)
Resident Evil Original release dates: JP: March 22, 1996; NA: March 30, 1996; PAL: August 1, 1996	Notes: The Director's Cut and Director's Cut Dual Shock Ver. feature additional game modes. The latter also supports the PlayStation Dual Shock controller analog sticks; Deadly Silence features several new gameplay modes
Resident Evil 2 Original release dates: NA: January 21, 1998; JP: January 29, 1998; PAL: April 29, 1998	Release years by system: 1998 - PlayStation; 1998 - PlayStation (Dual Shock ver.); 1998 - Game.com; 1999 - Microsoft Windows; 1999 - Nintendo 64; 1999 - Dreamcast; 2003 - GameCube
Resident Evil 2 Original release dates: NA: January 21, 1998; JP: January 29, 1998; PAL: April 29, 1998	Notes: The Dual Shock Ver. supports the PlayStation Dual Shock controller analog sticks
Resident Evil 3: Nemesis Original release dates: JP: September 22, 1999; NA: November 11, 1999; EU: February 21, 2000	Release years by system: 1999 - PlayStation; 2000 - Microsoft Windows; 2000 - Dreamcast; 2003 - GameCube
Resident Evil – Code: Veronica Original release dates: JP: February 3, 2000; NA: February 29, 2000; EU: May 26, 2000	Release years by system: 2000 - Dreamcast; 2001 - PlayStation 2; 2003 - GameCube; 2011 - PlayStation 3 & Xbox 360; 2017 - PlayStation 4
Resident Evil – Code: Veronica Original release dates: JP: February 3, 2000; NA: February 29, 2000; EU: May 26, 2000	Notes: All versions after the first Dreamcast release are titled Code: Veronica X and include additional cutscenes; PlayStation 3 and Xbox 360 releases are remastered in high definition; PlayStation 4 release is an emulated version of the PlayStation 2 release, and is not in high definition
Resident Evil Zero Original release dates: NA: November 12, 2002; JP: November 21, 2002; AU: February 28, 2003; EU: March 7, 2003	Release years by system: 2002 - GameCube; 2008 - Nintendo Wii; 2016 - PlayStation 3, PlayStation 4, Xbox 360, Xbox One, & Microsoft Windows; 2019 - Nintendo Switch
Resident Evil Zero Original release dates: NA: November 12, 2002; JP: November 21, 2002; AU: February 28, 2003; EU: March 7, 2003	Notes: A prequel to the Resident Evil remake; Titled Resident Evil Archives: Resident Evil Zero on the Wii; 2016 and Nintendo Switch releases are remastered in high definition under the title Resident Evil Zero HD Remaster
Resident Evil 4 Original release dates: NA: January 11, 2005; JP: January 27, 2005; PAL: March 18, 2005	Release years by system: 2005 - GameCube; 2005 - PlayStation 2; 2007 - Microsoft Windows; 2007 - Nintendo Wii; 2008 - Zeebo; 2009 - iOS; 2011 - PlayStation 3 & Xbox 360; 2013 - Android; 2014 - Microsoft Windows (Ultimate HD Edition); 2015 - Wii U (Wii Edition); 2016 - PlayStation 4 & Xbox One; 2019 - Nintendo Switch; 2021 - Meta Quest 2/3 family headsets
Resident Evil 4 Original release dates: NA: January 11, 2005; JP: January 27, 2005; PAL: March 18, 2005	Notes: All console and PC releases from 2011 onwards are remastered in high definition
Resident Evil 5 Original release dates: JP: March 5, 2009; AU: March 12, 2009; NA: March 13, 2009; EU: March 13, 2009	Release years by system: 2009 - PlayStation 3, Xbox 360, & Microsoft Windows; 2010 - PlayStation 3 & Xbox 360 (Gold Edition); 2015 - Microsoft Windows (Gold Edition); 2016 - PlayStation 4, Xbox One, & Shield Android TV; 2019 - Nintendo Switch
Resident Evil 5 Original release dates: JP: March 5, 2009; AU: March 12, 2009; NA: March 13, 2009; EU: March 13, 2009	Notes: Gold Edition features extra content; PlayStation 4, Xbox One, Shield Android TV, and Nintendo Switch versions include all Gold Edition content
Resident Evil 6 Original release dates: WW: 2 October 2012; JP: 4 October 2012	Release years by system: 2012 - PlayStation 3 & Xbox 360; 2013 - Microsoft Windows; 2016 - PlayStation 4 & Xbox One; 2019 - Nintendo Switch
Resident Evil 6 Original release dates: WW: 2 October 2012; JP: 4 October 2012	Notes: PlayStation 4, Xbox One, and Nintendo Switch versions include all downloadable content
Resident Evil 7: Biohazard Original release dates: WW: January 24, 2017; JP: January 26, 2017	Release years by system: 2017 - PlayStation 4, Xbox One & Microsoft Windows; 2018 - Nintendo Switch (Japan); 2021 - Google Stadia; 2022 - Xbox Series X/S, PlayStation 5, Nintendo Switch (Cloud, Worldwide); 2024 - iOS; 2026 - Nintendo Switch 2
Resident Evil 7: Biohazard Original release dates: WW: January 24, 2017; JP: January 26, 2017	Notes: Supports PlayStation VR; Nintendo Switch version is only available through cloud streaming
Resident Evil Village Original release date: WW: May 7, 2021	Release years by system: 2021 - PlayStation 5, PlayStation 4, Xbox Series X/S, Xbox One, Microsoft Windows, Google Stadia; 2022 - Nintendo Switch (Cloud), macOS; 2023 - iOS; 2026 - Nintendo Switch 2
Resident Evil Village Original release date: WW: May 7, 2021	Notes: Supports PlayStation VR2
Resident Evil Requiem Original release date: WW: Feb 27, 2026	Release years by system: 2026 - PlayStation 5, Xbox Series X/S, Microsoft Windows, Nintendo Switch 2

==== Remakes ====
Game	Details
Resident Evil Original release dates: JP: March 22, 2002; NA: April 30, 2002; EU: September 13, 2002	Release years by system: 2002 - GameCube; 2008 - Wii; 2014 - PlayStation 3, Xbox 360; 2015 - PlayStation 4, Xbox One, Microsoft Windows; 2019 - Nintendo Switch
Resident Evil Original release dates: JP: March 22, 2002; NA: April 30, 2002; EU: September 13, 2002	Notes: A remake of the original Resident Evil; Re-released on Wii under the title Resident Evil Archives: Resident Evil; Remastered in high definition for Xbox 360, PlayStation 3, PlayStation 4, Windows, and Nintendo Switch under the title Resident Evil HD Remaster
Resident Evil 2 Original release date: January 25, 2019	Release years by system: 2019 - PlayStation 4, Windows, Xbox One; 2022 - Xbox Series X/S, PlayStation 5, Nintendo Switch (Cloud); 2024 - macOS, iOS; 2026 - Nintendo Switch 2
Resident Evil 2 Original release date: January 25, 2019	Notes: A remake of Resident Evil 2
Resident Evil 3 Original release dates: April 3, 2020	Release years by system: 2020 - PlayStation 4, Windows, Xbox One; 2022 - Xbox Series X/S, PlayStation 5, Nintendo Switch (Cloud); 2025 - macOS, iOS; 2026 - Nintendo Switch 2
Resident Evil 3 Original release dates: April 3, 2020	Notes: A remake of Resident Evil 3: Nemesis
Resident Evil 4 Original release date: March 24, 2023	Release years by system: 2023 - PlayStation 4, PlayStation 5, Windows, Xbox Series X/S, macOS, iOS; 2026 - Nintendo Switch 2
Resident Evil 4 Original release date: March 24, 2023	Notes: A remake of Resident Evil 4; Supports PlayStation VR2
Resident Evil: Veronica Original release date: 2027	Release years by system: 2027 - Nintendo Switch 2, PlayStation 5, Windows, Xbox Series X/S
Resident Evil: Veronica Original release date: 2027	Notes: A remake of Resident Evil – Code: Veronica

=== Other games ===
==== Console ====
Game	Details
Resident Evil Survivor Original release dates: JP: January 27, 2000; EU: March 31, 2000; NA: August 30, 2000	Release years by system: 2000 - PlayStation; 2002 - Microsoft Windows
Resident Evil Survivor Original release dates: JP: January 27, 2000; EU: March 31, 2000; NA: August 30, 2000	Notes: Part of the Gun Survivor series; The Microsoft Windows version was released only in China and Taiwan in 2002
Resident Evil Gaiden Original release dates: PAL: December 14, 2001; JP: March 29, 2002; NA: June 3, 2002	Release years by system: 2001 - Game Boy Color
Resident Evil Survivor 2 – Code: Veronica Original release dates: JP: November 8, 2001; EU: March 22, 2002	Release years by system: 2001 - Arcade, PlayStation 2
Resident Evil Survivor 2 – Code: Veronica Original release dates: JP: November 8, 2001; EU: March 22, 2002	Notes: Part of the Gun Survivor series
Resident Evil: Dead Aim Original release dates: JP: February 13, 2003; NA: June 17, 2003; PAL: July 9, 2003	Release years by system: 2003 - PlayStation 2
Resident Evil: Dead Aim Original release dates: JP: February 13, 2003; NA: June 17, 2003; PAL: July 9, 2003	Notes: Part of the Gun Survivor series
Resident Evil Outbreak Original release dates: JP: December 11, 2003; NA: March 31, 2004; PAL: September 17, 2004	Release years by system: 2003 - PlayStation 2
Resident Evil Outbreak: File #2 Original release dates: JP: September 9, 2004; NA: April 26, 2005; PAL: August 26, 2005	Release years by system: 2004 - PlayStation 2
Resident Evil: The Umbrella Chronicles Original release dates: NA: November 13, 2007; JP: November 15, 2007; EU: November 30, 2007; AU: December 13, 2007	Release years by system: 2007 - Wii; 2012 - PlayStation 3
Resident Evil: The Umbrella Chronicles Original release dates: NA: November 13, 2007; JP: November 15, 2007; EU: November 30, 2007; AU: December 13, 2007	Notes: The game exposes the Umbrella Corporation's meddling throughout the Resident Evil series through narration from Albert Wesker and hidden documents pertaining to the organization's secret motives and actions. The game is composed of five scenarios that retell and recapitulate the events of Resident Evil Zero, the Resident Evil remake, and Resident Evil 3: Nemesis, as well as new material pertaining to the Umbrella Corporation's downfall
Resident Evil Portable Original release date: Unreleased	Release years by system: Unreleased - PlayStation Portable
Resident Evil Portable Original release date: Unreleased	Notes: Announced at E3 2009
Resident Evil: The Darkside Chronicles Original release dates: NA: November 17, 2009; AU: November 26, 2009; EU: November 27, 2009; JP: January 14, 2010	Release years by system: 2009 - Wii; 2012 - PlayStation 3
Resident Evil: The Darkside Chronicles Original release dates: NA: November 17, 2009; AU: November 26, 2009; EU: November 27, 2009; JP: January 14, 2010	Notes: The game revolves around the personal stories and tragedies in the Resident Evil series. The game is composed of four scenarios that retell and recapitulate the events of Resident Evil 2 and Resident Evil — Code: Veronica; A hidden scenario Darkness Falls focuses on Jack Krauser and serves as a prequel to Resident Evil 4
Resident Evil: The Mercenaries 3D Original release dates: JP: June 2, 2011; NA: June 28, 2011; AU: June 30, 2011; EU: July 1, 2011	Release years by system: 2011 - Nintendo 3DS; 2012 - Nintendo eShop
Resident Evil: Revelations Original release dates: JP: January 26, 2012; EU: January 27, 2012; NA: February 7, 2012	Release years by system: 2012 - Nintendo 3DS; 2013 - Wii U, PlayStation 3, Xbox 360, Microsoft Windows; 2017 - PlayStation 4, Xbox One, Nintendo Switch
Resident Evil: Revelations Original release dates: JP: January 26, 2012; EU: January 27, 2012; NA: February 7, 2012	Notes: All subsequent releases after the 3DS were in HD; In Japan, it was known as Biohazard Revelations: The Unveiled Edition, which was also in HD
Resident Evil: Operation Raccoon City Original release dates: NA: March 20, 2012; AU: March 22, 2012; EU: March 23, 2012; JP: April 26, 2012	Release years by system: 2012 - PlayStation 3, Xbox 360, Microsoft Windows
Resident Evil: Revelations 2 Original release dates: NA: February 24, 2015; EU: February 25, 2015; JP: February 25, 2015	Release years by system: 2015 - PlayStation 3, PlayStation 4, PlayStation Vita, Xbox 360, Xbox One, & Microsoft Windows 2017 - Nintendo Switch
Umbrella Corps Original release dates: NA: June 21, 2016; EU: June 21, 2016; JP: June 23, 2016	Release years by system: 2016 - PlayStation 4, Microsoft Windows
Resident Evil: Resistance Original release dates: NA: April 3, 2020; EU: April 3, 2020; JP: April 3, 2020	Release years by system: 2020 - PlayStation 4, Xbox One, PC (Steam)
Resident Evil: Resistance Original release dates: NA: April 3, 2020; EU: April 3, 2020; JP: April 3, 2020	Notes: Available for free when purchasing Resident Evil 3
Resident Evil Re:Verse Original release date: WW: October 28, 2022	Release years by system: 2022 - PlayStation 4, Xbox One, Xbox Series X, PlayStation 5, PC (Steam) & Microsoft Windows
Resident Evil Re:Verse Original release date: WW: October 28, 2022	Notes: Available for free when purchasing Resident Evil Village, servers shut down June 29, 2025.
Resident Evil 2 Arcade Original release date: TBA	Release years by system: Arcade
Resident Evil 2 Arcade Original release date: TBA	Notes: Previously known as Resident Evil 2: Dead Shot

==== Mobile phone ====
Game	Details
Biohazard: i Survivor Original release dates: 2001	Release years by system: 2001 - Mobile Phones
Biohazard: Zombie Shooter Original release dates: 2001	Release years by system: 2001 - Mobile Phones
Resident Evil: ZombieBuster Original release dates: 2001 (original version) 2011 (remake version)	Release years by system: 2011 - Mobile Phones (only in Japan)
Resident Evil Assault the Nightmare Original release dates: JP: 2002; EU: Mid-2004	Release years by system: 2002 - Mobile Phones
Resident Evil Assault the Nightmare Original release dates: JP: 2002; EU: Mid-2004	Notes: Originally released as Biohazard: A.T.N. Assault the Nightmare in Japan.
Resident Evil: The Missions Original release dates: 2D version: JP: December 1, 2003; 3D version: JP: June 2, 2005; NA: April 19, 2006	Release years by system: 2003 - Mobile Phones
Biohazard: The Stories Original release dates: JP: 2004	Release years by system: 2004 - Docomo, EZweb, Yahoo! Keitai
Biohazard: The Stories Original release dates: JP: 2004	Notes: Follow-up to The Missions.
Resident Evil: Confidential Report Original release dates: JP: January 14, 2004; NA/PAL: 2006	Release years by system: 2004 - Mobile Phones
Resident Evil 4: Mobile Edition Original release dates: 2005 (2D version) 2009 (3D version)	Release years by system: 2005 - N-Gage; 2009 - Zeebo; 2010 - Mobile Phones
Resident Evil 4: Mobile Edition Original release dates: 2005 (2D version) 2009 (3D version)	Notes: This game has the updated version called Resident Evil 4: Platinum.
Biohazard: The Operations Original release dates:	Release years by system: 2007
Biohazard: The Episodes Original release dates: 2007	Release years by system: 2007 - Mobile phones
Resident Evil: Genesis Original release dates: 2008	Release years by system: 2008 - Mobile Phones
Resident Evil: Degeneration Original release dates: 2008 (2D and 3D versions)	Release years by system: 2008 - Mobile Phones, N-Gage
Resident Evil: Uprising Original release dates: 2009	Release years by system:
BIOHAZARD Survival Door Original release dates:	Release years by system: 2010
Resident Evil: Afterlife Movie Game Original release dates:	Release years by system: 2010
Resident Evil: Mercenaries Vs. Original release dates: April 14, 2011	Release years by system: 2011 - iOS
Resident Evil: Mercenaries Vs. Original release dates: April 14, 2011	Notes: This game is originally released as BIOHAZARD VS. (formerly titled as BIOHAZARD Mercenaries VS. for GREE and BIOHAZARD VS. for GREE), in Japan.; This game has the alternative and updated higher quality version called Resident Evil VS. (GREE).
Resident Evil Outbreak Survive Original release dates:	Release years by system: 2011
Minna to Biohazard Clan Master Original release dates:	Release years by system: 2012
Minna to Biohazard Team Survive Original release dates:	Release years by system: 2015
Bakahaza Original release dates: 2017	Release years by system: 2017
Resident Evil Survival Unit Original release dates: 2025	Release years by system: 2025

==== Pachinko ====
Game	Details
Pachisuro Biohazard Original release date: 2008	Release years by system:
Biohazard 5 Original release date: 2012	Release years by system:
CR Biohazard Original release date: 2013	Release years by system:
CR Biohazard Original release date: 2013	Notes: There are two different versions of this game: CR Biohazard Zōshoku Version (2014); CR Biohazard Kansen Version (2014)
CR Biohazard 0 Original release date: 2015	Release years by system:
CR Biohazard 0 Original release date: 2015	Notes: There are three different versions of this game: CR Biohazard 0 Sweet Version (2015); CR Biohazard 0 Light Middle Type (2015); CR Biohazard 0 "MAX Version" (2015)
Pachisuro Biohazard 6 Original release date: 2015	Release years by system:
Pachisuro Biohazard Revelations Original release date: 2017	Release years by system:
Pachisuro Biohazard Revelations Original release date: 2017	Notes: There are three different versions of this game: Biohazard: Into the Panic (2018); CRF Biohazard Revelations (2018); PF Biohazard Revelations Light Version (2019)
FEVER BIOHAZARD REVELATIONS 2 Original release date: 2020	Release years by system:
FEVER BIOHAZARD REVELATIONS 2 Original release date: 2020	Notes: There are two different versions of this game: P FEVER BIOHAZARD REVELATIONS 2 Light Middle Version (2020); P FEVER BIOHAZARD REVELATIONS 2 Light Version (2020)
Pachislot BIOHAZARD 7: Resident Evil Original release date: 2020	Release years by system:
Pachislot BIOHAZARD RE:2 Original release date: 2022	Release years by system:

== Film and television ==
=== Live-action films ===
Title	Release	Director	Producers	Writer
Anderson continuity
Resident Evil	2002	Paul W. S. Anderson	Paul W. S. Anderson, Bernd Eichinger, Jeremy Bolt, Samuel Hadida	Paul W. S. Anderson
Resident Evil: Apocalypse	2004	Alexander Witt	Paul W. S. Anderson, Jeremy Bolt, Don Carmody	Paul W. S. Anderson
Resident Evil: Extinction	2007	Russell Mulcahy	Paul W. S. Anderson, Jeremy Bolt, Robert Kulzer, Bernd Eichinger, Samuel Hadida	Paul W. S. Anderson
Resident Evil: Afterlife	2010	Paul W. S. Anderson	Paul W. S. Anderson, Jeremy Bolt, Robert Kulzer, Don Carmody, Bernd Eichinger, Samuel Hadida	Paul W. S. Anderson
Resident Evil: Retribution	2012	Paul W. S. Anderson	Paul W. S. Anderson, Jeremy Bolt, Samuel Hadida, Don Carmody, Robert Kulzer	Paul W. S. Anderson
Resident Evil: The Final Chapter	2016	Paul W. S. Anderson	Paul W. S. Anderson, Jeremy Bolt, Robert Kulzer, Samuel Hadida	Paul W. S. Anderson
Reboots
Resident Evil: Welcome to Raccoon City	2021	Johannes Roberts	James Harris, Hartley Gorenstein, Robert Kulzer	Johannes Roberts
Resident Evil	2026	Zach Cregger	Robert Kulzer, Roy Lee, Miri Yoon, Asad Qizilbash, Carter Swan	Zach Cregger, Shay Hatten
Short film
Resident Evil Requiem - Evil Has Always Had a Name	2026	Rich Lee	N/A	N/A

=== Animated films ===
Title	Release	Director	Producer(s)	Writer
Flagship continuity
Biohazard 4D-Executer	2000	Koichi Ohata	Kenji Yoshida, Naoki Miyachi	Daisuke Okamoto
Prime continuity (Note: Prime continuity is Capcom's official Resident Evil canon. It is the canon in which the majority of the series' mainline video games are set.)
Resident Evil: Degeneration	2008	Makoto Kamiya	Hiroyuki Kobayashi	Shotaro Suga
Resident Evil: Damnation	2012	Makoto Kamiya	Hiroyuki Kobayashi	Shotaro Suga
Resident Evil: Vendetta	2017	Takanori Tsujimoto	Hiroyuki Kobayashi, Hiroyasu Shinohara, Takashi Shimizu	Makoto Fukami
Resident Evil: Death Island	2023	Eiichiro Hasumi	Hiroyasu Shinohara	Makoto Fukami

=== Television series ===
Title	Release	Director	Producer(s)	Writer
Prime continuity
Resident Evil: Infinite Darkness	2021	Eiichirō Hasumi	Hiroyasu Shinohara	Eiichirō Hasumi, Shogo Moto
Netflix continuity
Resident Evil	2022	Various	Martin Moszkowicz	Various

== Novels ==
=== Written by S. D. Perry ===
Title	Release	Notes
Resident Evil: The Umbrella Conspiracy	1998	Novelization of the original Resident Evil
Resident Evil: Caliban Cove	1998	Original story set after the events of the first novel
Resident Evil: City of the Dead	1999	Novelization of Resident Evil 2
Resident Evil: Underworld	1999	Original story after the events of the third novel
Resident Evil: Nemesis	2000	Novelization of Resident Evil 3: Nemesis
Resident Evil: Code Veronica	2003	Novelization of Resident Evil - Code: Veronica
Resident Evil: Zero Hour	2004	Novelization of Resident Evil Zero

=== Novelizations of the live action films ===
Title	Release	Author	Notes
BIOHAZARD	2002	Osamu Makino	Novelization of the first Resident Evil film; Released only in Japan
Resident Evil: Genesis	2004	Keith DeCandido	Novelization of the first Resident Evil film
Resident Evil: Apocalypse	2004	Keith DeCandido	Novelization of the film of the same name
Resident Evil: Extinction	2007	Keith DeCandido	Novelization of the film of the same name
Resident Evil: Retribution	2012	John Shirley	Novelization of the film of the same name
Resident Evil: The Final Chapter	2017	Tim Waggoner	Novelization of the film of the same name

=== Other novels ===
Title	Release	Author	Notes
Resident Evil: The Book	1997	Hiroyuki Ariga	Released in Japan as "Biohazard: the beginning"; Part of the book "The True Story of Biohazard", which was given away as a pre-order bonus with the Sega Saturn version of the original Resident Evil video game.; The story serves as a prelude to the events of the original Resident Evil video game, in which Chris investigates the disappearance of his missing friend, Billy Rabbitson.
BIO HAZARD The Wicked North Sea	1998	Kyū Asakura	Written on the behalf of Flagship
Biohazard: to the Liberty	2002	Suiren Kimura	
Biohazard: Rose Blank	2002	Tadashi Aizawa	
Biohazard The Umbrella Chronicles SIDE A	2007	Osamu Makino	
Biohazard The Umbrella Chronicles SIDE B	2008	Osamu Makino	
biohazard DAMNATION	2012	Osamu Makino	Released only in Japan
BIOHAZARD VENDETTA	2017	Fukami Makoto	Released only in Japan

== Comics ==
Title	Release	Publisher	No. of issues or volumes
Resident Evil	1996	Marvel Comics	1
Resident Evil: The Official Comic Magazine	1998 - 2001	Image Comics	5
Resident Evil: Fire and Ice	2000 - 2001	Wildstorm	4
Resident Evil - Code: Veronica	2002	Wildstorm	4
Biohazard: The Umbrella Chronicles ~Hōkai he no Jokyoku~ / BIOHAZARD UMBRELLA CHRONICLES: Prelude to the Fall	2007	Akita Shoten	2 Chapters
Resident Evil	2009 - 2011	Wildstorm	6
Resident Evil: The Marhawa Desire	2012 - 2013	Akita Shoten, Viz Media (North American release)	5
Biohazard: Heavenly Island	2015 - 2017	Akita Shoten	5
Resident Evil: Infinite Darkness - The Beginning	2022 - 2024	Tokyopop	5
Biohazard: Death Island (Adaptation of the movie)	2023 - 2024	Kadokawa	1

== Stage plays ==
Title	Release	Production
Biohazard The Stage	2015	Avex Live Creative; Ace Crew Entertainment
Musical Biohazard ~Voice of Gaia~	2016	Umeda Arts Theater
Biohazard The Experience	2017	Avex Live Creative; Ace Crew Entertainment
