= Gun Survivor =

Gun Survivor (ガンサバイバー, Gan Sabaibā) is a light gun video game series produced by Capcom between 2000 and 2003. The series name was omitted when the games were localized outside Japan. The series includes four games:

- Resident Evil Survivor, known as Gun Survivor: Biohazard in Japan
- Resident Evil Survivor 2 – Code: Veronica, known as Gun Survivor 2: Biohazard - Code: Veronica in Japan
- Dino Stalker, known as Gun Survivor 3: Dino Crisis in Japan
- Resident Evil: Dead Aim, known as Gun Survivor 4: Biohazard: Heroes Never Die in Japan
