= Dreamcast light guns =

Light guns for use in conjunction with the Sega Dreamcast

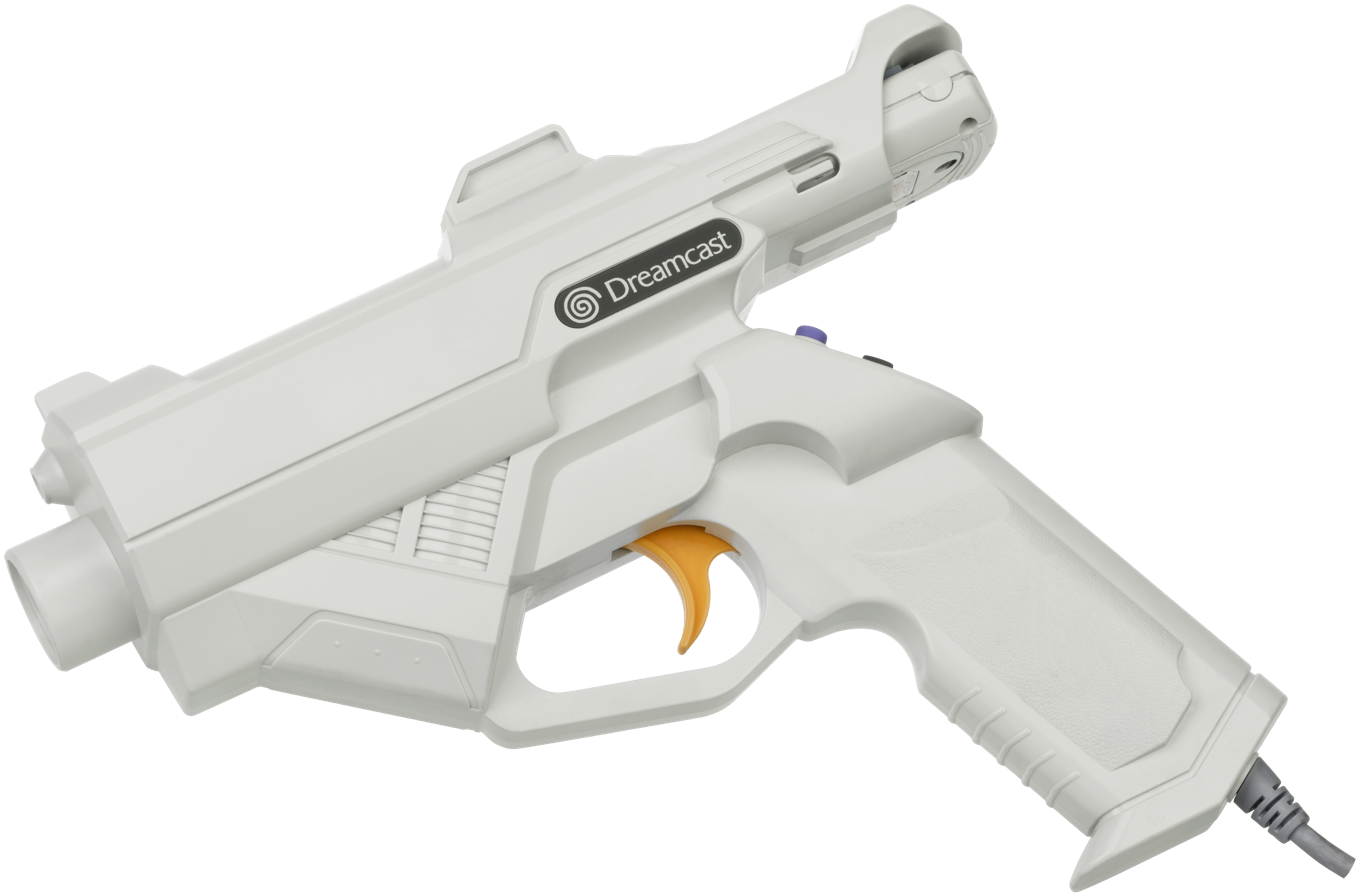
The official Sega light gun.

The Dreamcast video game console had several light guns released as accessories during its lifespan. The official light gun from Sega was released in Europe and Asia; in the United States, it was previewed in magazines preceding the console's release, but it ultimately never released due to concerns about bad press in the wake of the Columbine High School massacre. Instead, an officially licensed light gun was released by Mad Catz for the U.S. market.

Several Dreamcast games support light guns, as well as various homebrew titles. The light guns work with a CRT TV or a CRT VGA monitor in 640x480 mode.

== Official light guns ==
=== Dreamcast Gun ===
The Dreamcast Gun is a light gun that was released only in Europe and Asia, where it is the official light gun for use. It works on American consoles due to its lack of regional lockout. However, some American games such as Confidential Mission and House of the Dead 2 were intentionally region-locked and will not work with the Japanese gun. Other North American releases, such as Virtua Cop 2 are not soft-locked.

The pistol-shaped gun has one expansion slot that is compatible with the VMU and the vibration pack.

=== Dream Blaster ===
Mad Catz's Dream Blaster is the official Dreamcast light gun for use in the United States. It features official Sega branding on the side of the gun and has a design mimicking the Dreamcast Gun. This gun also features an auto-reload and auto-fire feature. However, unlike the Star Fire Light Blaster, it lacks the delay, thus giving the player an infinite stream of ammunition.

== Unofficial light guns ==
=== StarFire LightBlaster ===
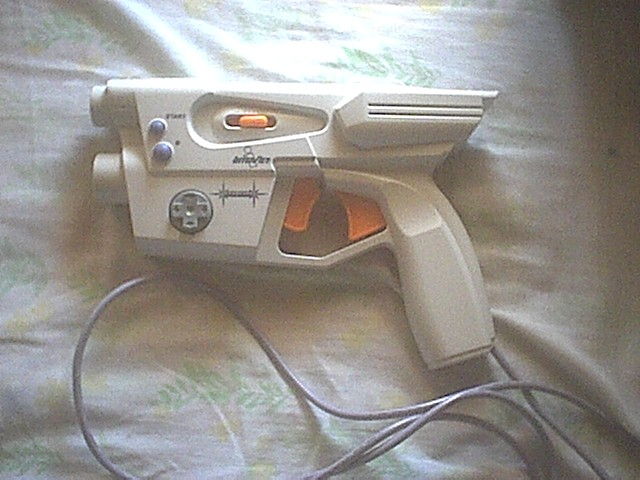
Interact's StarFire LightBlaster.

This officially licensed light gun was manufactured by Interact and retailed for $30. This accessory features a directional pad on its left side and two start and B buttons on each side. It has a few extra features compared to the official light gun: an auto-reload trigger located in front of the gun trigger, an auto-fire mode, and an "intelligent reload" mode.

=== SRC Bio Gun ===
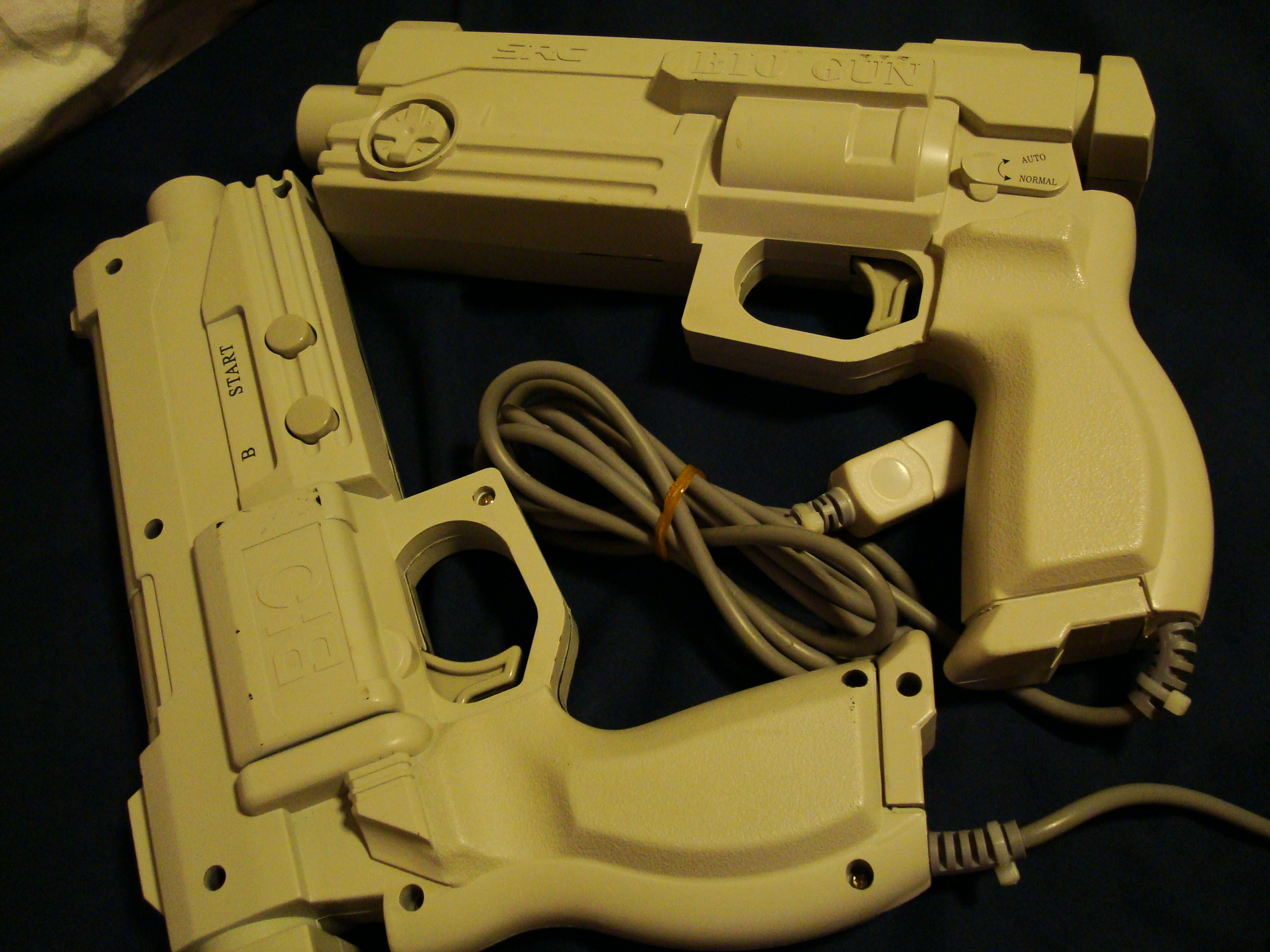
SRC BIO GUN

The Bio Gun is identical in form to the Saturn light gun, but is a beige color similar to the Dreamcast console. It incorporates auto fire and auto reload functions, has internal vibration, an 8-way directional pad, and B/Start buttons.

If the "Silent Scope" mode is chosen with the mode selector, the player can control the scope with the 8-way directional pad at the side like with the analog stick on the normal pad. There is a mode selector switch at the side of the gun. The selector switch has two modes, auto and single fire.

=== Virtual Blaster ===
The Virtual Blaster is a third party "made in China" light gun for the Dreamcast. It bears the brand name Topmax.

It looks very similar to the Dream Blaster except that it is slightly shorter and does not have a rubber grip. It has a small 8-directional D-Pad, B and START button on the back of the gun. There are 3 shooting modes: manual, auto-reload and auto-fire/reload (3-position slider button on the left side of the barrel). The auto-fire/reload does not have any delay. It has a VMU slot, but a rumble pack is unnecessary as it has a built-in vibration function that can be switched off with the 2-position slider button on the right side of the barrel.

=== DCX Blaster ===
The DCX Blaster is an almost exact clone of the original Dreamcast Gun, except that it is painted black and has minor stylistic variations. It features a single expansion slot and is compatible in all regions. It has variable firing configurations which include manual-reload & triggered-fire, auto-reload & triggered-fire, and auto-reload & auto-fire.

=== Hais DC Lightgun with Kick-Back ===
Hais DC Lightgun with Kick-Back has 3 modes of operation which are selected using a switch: "Normal" (single shot), "AR" (single shot with auto reload) and "AR+AF" (automatic fire with automatic reload). The gun features a kick-back feature where the slide actually kicks back and forth every shot (which can be disabled using a switch). For this functionality, however, the gun requires an additional power supply to be plugged into the gun's plug on the Dreamcast console.

The gun is modeled after a Desert Eagle, and is white with orange buttons. There are also versions sold under the "Desert Eagle" label that are all black. There is no VMU slot. The gun features a D-pad and Start and B buttons beneath the barrel and an additional B Button is on the grip itself. Though the hammer is articulated, it has no function.

Hais also released a Guncon 2 version for the PlayStation 2

=== Hais DC Mini Gun ===
The Hais DC Mini Gun has both single shot and autofire capabilities and has a built-in vibration function (which can be disabled using a switch). The gun is small in comparison to other light guns for the Dreamcast. There are no expansion slots. The gun features a directional pad and Start and B buttons beneath the barrel. The trigger uses a plastic slide, as opposed to hinged triggers, which produce clicking noises. The orange plastic hammer of the gun is actually a functional button capable of triggering a secondary weapon.

=== Yobo Gameware DC Lightgun ===
Yobo DC Lightgun has 3 modes of operation which are selected using a switch: "Normal" (single shot), "AR" (single shot with auto reload) and "AF" (automatic fire with automatic reload). It also has a vibration on/off switch. It looks like the original Dreamcast Gun but bulkier. There is an expansion slot. The gun features a D-pad with Start and B buttons above the grip along with the trigger.

=== SRC DC Wireless Gun ===
This Dreamcast light gun was modeled after light guns traditionally used in arcades. It is wireless and uses a transmitter that utilizes infrared signals. The box gives these instructions:

- For best results, the SRC DC should stay within four meters of the receiver
- The distance between the receiver and the TV should not exceed one meter
- The light gun uses one 9V battery to power the IR transmitter
- The receiver has a mode selection switch that allows it to be used with Silent Scope

=== Pelican Stinger ===
A gun by Pelican.

- Reload Trigger for rapid manual reloading of bullets
- Built-in Jolt Action with On/Off Selector
- Auto Reload Mode: Single fire with automatic bullet reload
- Turbo Fire Mode: Turbo fire with automatic bullet reload
- Rubberized Head Grips
- Compatible with VMU and jump pack

=== ThrustMaster Pump Action Light gun ===
A gun by Thrustmaster (Thrust Master)

- Black and white colours with THRUSTMASTER logo
- Supports different modes of fire

=== Terra Nexus Light Gun ===
The gun is grey with orange buttons and carries the imprint "Terra Nexus 12mm" together with a switch on the side. The other side has a digital pad, three buttons and another switch. The front carries a red LED to simulate a laser targeting system.

== Supported games ==
=== Commercial games ===
- Death Crimson OX (Only the Japanese release supports the European light-guns)
- Death Crimson 2 (Japan only release)
- Demolition Racer: No Exit (North America only release, light gun supported only in 'Big Car Hunter' minigame)
- Confidential Mission
- House of the Dead 2
- Virtua Cop 2 (as part of the Sega Smash Pack in North America, as a standalone release in Japan, not released in PAL regions in any form)

=== Freeware games ===
- bloop
- SMSPlus
- NesterDC
- Pop a Cap
- Revolver
