= GunCon =

Family of gun peripherals

- Developer: Namco
- Manufacturer: Namco
- Type: Light gun
- Released: GunCon: JP: June 1997; WW: November 1997; GunCon 2: JP: October 4, 2001; WW: 2001; GunCon 3: JP: December 20, 2007; WW: 2008
- Platform: PlayStation, PlayStation 2, PlayStation 3
- Related: JogCon; NeGcon
- Website: bandainamcoent.co.jp/cs/list/guncon/

The GunCon (Note: Japanese: ガンコン, Hepburn: Gankon), known as the G-Con in Europe, is a family of gun peripherals designed by Namco for the PlayStation consoles. The original controllers used traditional light gun technology, while newer controllers use LED tracking technology.

== Background ==
The first GunCon NPC-103 (G-Con 45 in Europe) was bundled with the PlayStation conversion of Time Crisis. To make the gun affordable to consumers, the force feedback feature of the Time Crisis arcade gun was omitted, and an additional fire button was included in lieu of releasing a pedal controller for the game's ducking mechanic. A second version of the GunCon, known as the GunCon 2 NPC-106 (G-Con 2 in Europe), was bundled with the PlayStation 2 conversion of Time Crisis II and Time Crisis 3. Time Crisis 4 came out for the PlayStation 3 bundled with the GunCon 3 NC-109 (G-Con 3 in Europe). In Japan, all three GunCon models were also available for sale as a separate accessory outside of a game bundle.

The GunCon was preceded by the Hyper Blaster (sold as the Justifier in North America) manufactured by Konami, which was the first light gun peripheral for the PlayStation. Konami's Hyper Blaster and Namco's Guncon were mutually incompatible due to the fact that the Hyper Blaster only requires to be plugged into either of the console's controller ports in order to work, whereas the Guncon also requires a connection into the console's video output port in order to synchronize with its video signals for better accuracy. Initially the GunCon was only designed to support Namco-developed titles, but other developers immediately started adopting it for their own gun shooting titles as well, eventually phasing out Konami's peripheral as the console's primary gun peripheral. A few titles, namely Die Hard Trilogy 2: Viva Las Vegas, Elemental Gearbolt, Maximum Force, and Mighty Hits Special, features support for both peripherals, while certain third-party light guns were also produced that support switching between Hyper Blaster and GunCon modes.

== Models ==
=== GunCon ===
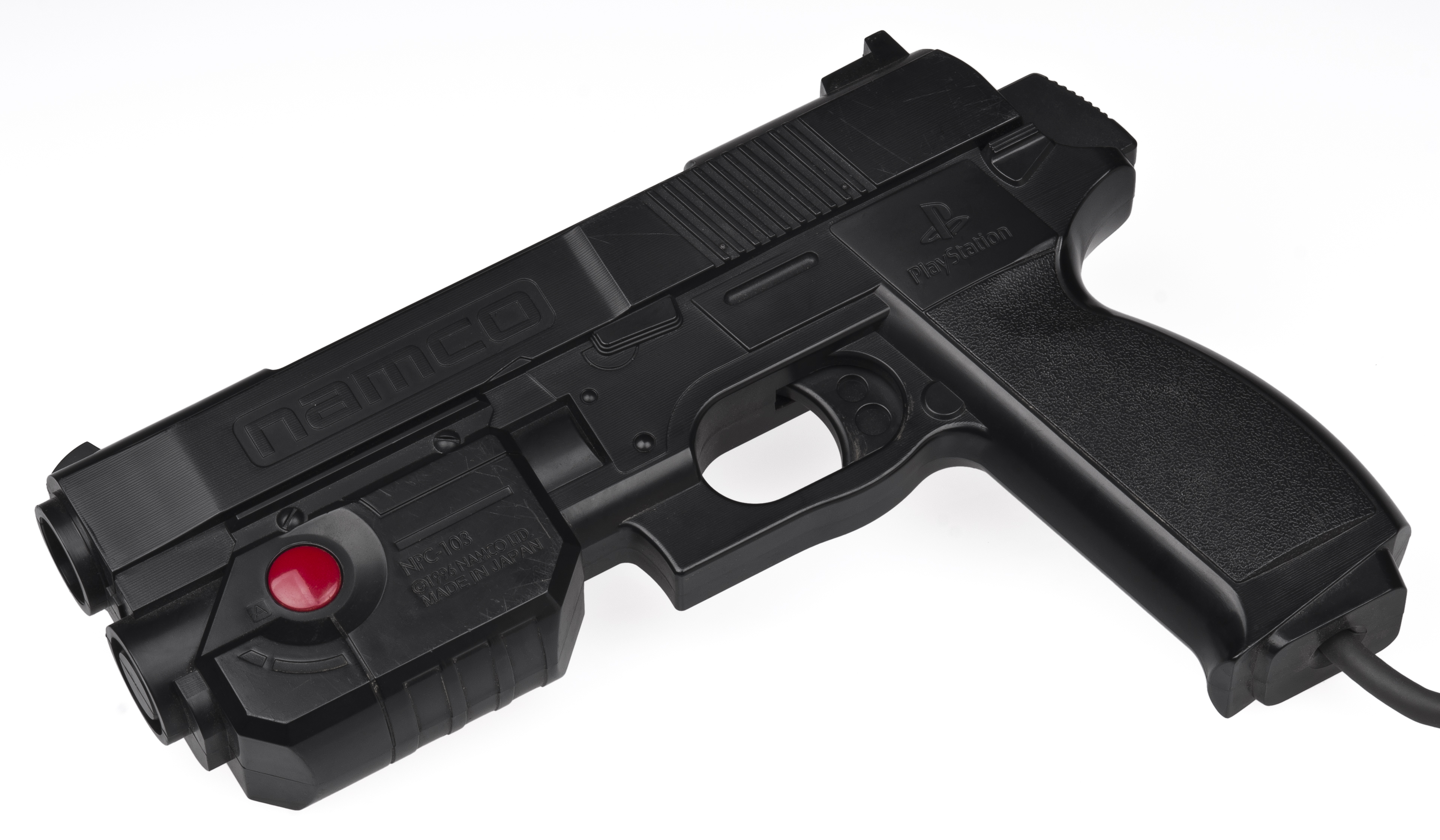
The black GunCon controller for the PlayStation

The GunCon controller (known as G-Con 45 in Europe) uses the cathode ray timing method to determine where the barrel is aimed at on the screen when the trigger is pulled. It features a button below the barrel on either side of the gun (buttons A and B, both performing the same function) for auxiliary in-game control, such as to take cover and reload in Time Crisis. The controller is released in black in Japan, and gray (and eventually, in orange) in both Europe and North America. The controller is compatible with some PlayStation 2 GunCon titles, but is not compatible with PlayStation 3 due to its lack of controller ports. Many games that support it allow the A and B buttons to be swapped, making it comfortable for both right and left-handed players.

The GunCon connect to the PlayStation console not only via its standard controller port, but also into its RCA video output jack in order to read its video signals for better accuracy. For later models of the console (from the SCPH-5500 and onward), which lacked the RCA output ports and only featured Sony's proprietary AV output port, as well as the PS one models and all PS2 consoles, a PlayStation AV Adapter (SCPH-1160) or any generic AV extension cable is required to use the original GunCon on those particular models. The AV Adapter was also required for the earlier consoles if an RF connection was being used instead.

=== GunCon 2 ===
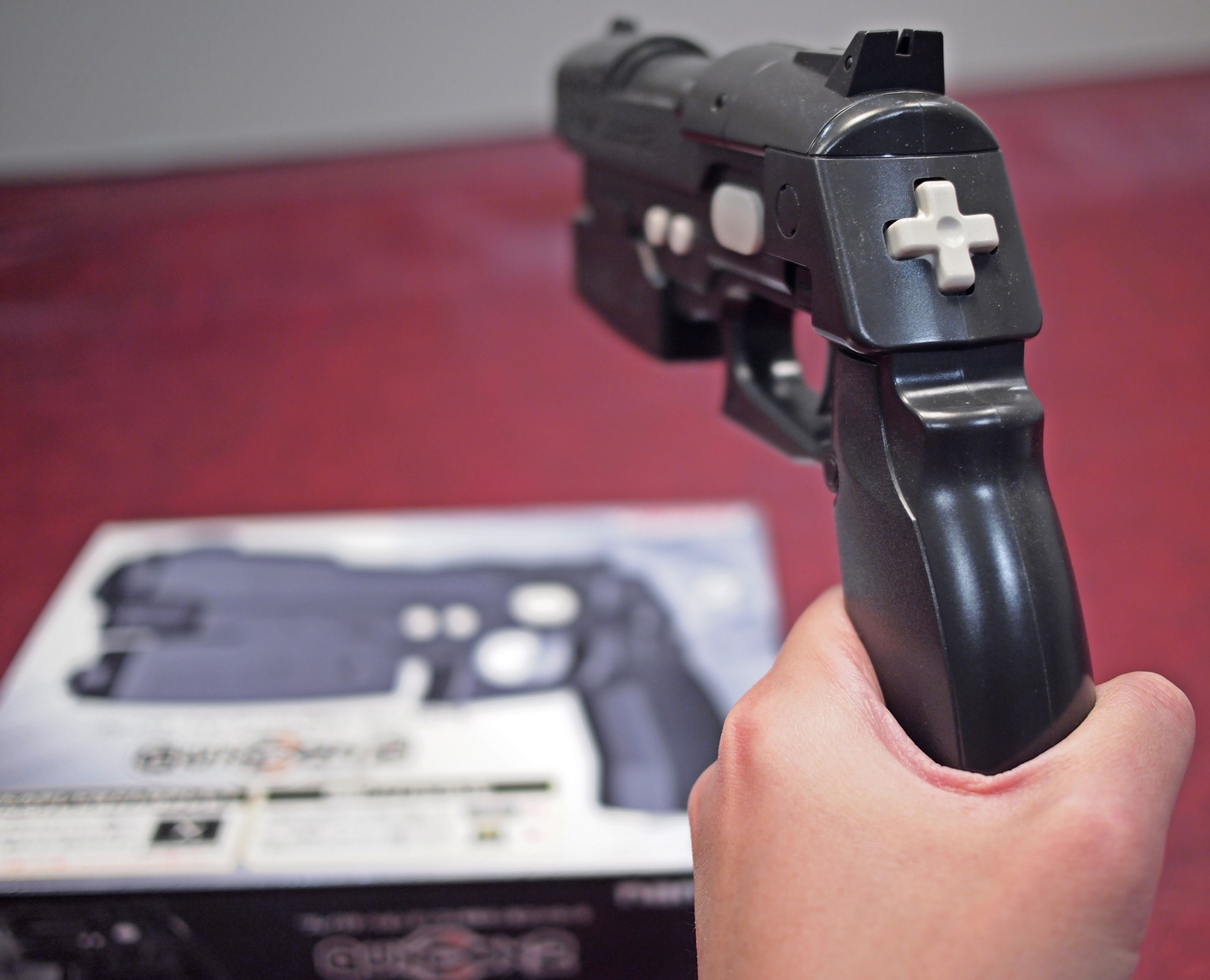
GunCon 2, Japanese domestic model: a d-pad has been added to the rear of the gun

GunCon 2 (G-Con 2 in Europe) features a smaller body, as well as a more rounded shape when compared with the original GunCon. The side buttons, A and B, have been moved rearward to a position directly above the trigger. Two new smaller buttons, SELECT and START, have been added to the left side of the shaft. Prominent additions to this second GunCon model is a D-pad at the back of the gun barrel and a C button added at the bottom of the gun handle. These new buttons served to open new gameplay opportunities, such as character movement in Dino Stalker or the ability to use two guns at once in Time Crisis II. The gun uses a USB connection as opposed to a PlayStation controller port of the GunCon 1 and also hooks into the video signal of the console (either composite video or the Y signal of component video). The controller is released in black in Japan, blue in Europe, and orange in North America. It is not compatible with original PlayStation titles or PlayStation 3 titles. The GunCon 2, with compatible games, can work on older models of the PlayStation 3 featuring any form of hardware-based PlayStation 2 backwards compatibility.

=== GunCon 3 ===
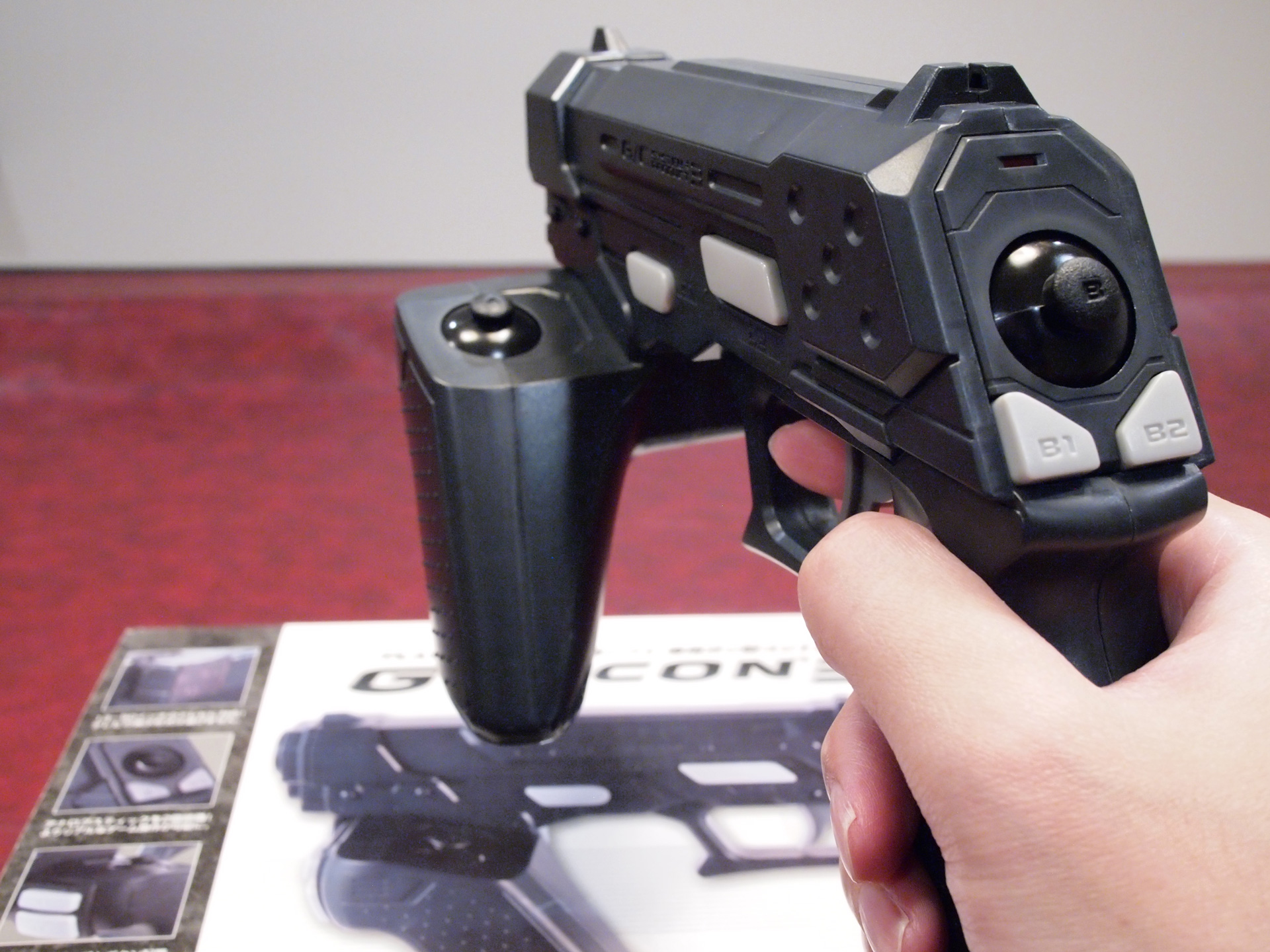
GunCon 3, Japanese domestic model: two analogue sticks have been added to the gun for advanced aiming/movement controls

The GunCon 3 utilizes two infrared LED lights as markers, placed on the left and right sides of the screen. An image sensor in the muzzle tracks the markers as reference points for determining where the gun is pointing on the screen. As opposed to the GunCon and GunCon 2, which are only compatible with CRT-based displays, the GunCon 3 supports a wide variety of display types, including LCD and Plasma.

The GunCon 3 features a "sub-grip", mounted underneath the barrel and extending to the left side for use with the left hand. On the sub-grip is an analog stick and two shoulder buttons, like in a modern gamepad. At the back end of the gun barrel is another analog stick and two buttons, B1 and B2, underneath. Another two buttons, C1 and C2, are placed along the left side of the barrel. The analog sticks allow the player to play first-person shooting games with manual aiming/firing of the light gun.

== Compatible video games with GunCon ==
=== GunCon compatible games ===
- Die Hard Trilogy 2: Viva Las Vegas
- Elemental Gearbolt
- Extreme Ghostbusters
- Ghoul Panic
- Gun Bare! Game Tengoku 2
- The Gun Shooting (Simple 1500 Series)
- The Gun Shooting 2 (Simple 1500 Series)
- Gunfighter: The Legend of Jesse James
- Guntu Western Front June, 1944
- Judge Dredd
- Maximum Force
- Mighty Hits Special
- Moorhuhn 2 – Die Jagd Geht Weiter'
- Moorhen 3 – ...Chicken Chase
- Moorhuhn X
- Point Blank
- Puffy P.S. I Love You
- Rescue Shot
- Resident Evil Survivor (Japan and PAL only)
- Time Crisis
- Time Crisis: Project Titan
- Cocoto Funfair (EU)
- Dino Stalker
- Endgame
- Gunfighter II: Revenge of Jesse James
- GunCom 2 (EU)
- Ninja Assault (EU)
- Resident Evil: Dead Aim
- Time Crisis II
- Time Crisis 3 (EU)
- Vampire Night

=== GunCon 2 compatible games ===
Some GunCon 2 (PS2) games are compatible with the original GunCon, unless the game utilizes the extra buttons on the GunCon 2.

- Crisis Zone
- Dino Stalker [US/EU] (AKA Gun Survivor 3: Dino Crisis [JP])
- Endgame [US/EU]
- GunCom 2 [EU] (AKA Death Crimson OX [JP])
- Gunfighter II: Revenge of Jesse James [EU]
- Gunvari Collection + Time Crisis [JP]
- Ninja Assault [JP/EU/NA]
- Resident Evil: Dead Aim [US] (AKA Gun Survivor 4 Biohazard Heroes Never Die [JP])
- Resident Evil Survivor 2 Code: Veronica [EU/JP]
- Starsky & Hutch (coop mode only)
- Time Crisis II
- Time Crisis 3
- Vampire Night [EU/JP/US]
- Virtua Cop: Elite Edition

=== GunCon 3 compatible games ===
- Time Crisis 4
- Time Crisis: Razing Storm [US/EU] (AKA Big 3 Gun Shooting [JP])
- Deadstorm Pirates

== iGunCon ==
iGunCon for iOS was released on July 21, 2011, which allows players to use an iPhone or iPod Touch in a similar fashion to the GunCon on Time Crisis 2nd Strike, an iOS exclusive entry in the Time Crisis series. iGunCon, along with Time Crisis 2nd Strike, was pulled from the app store in March of 2015.

== Reception ==
Electronic Gaming Monthly's four-person "review crew" gave the original GunCon scores of 7.5, 7.0, 8.0, and 7.5 out of 10. They criticized Namco's decisions to make it compatible only with Namco games and make Namco games incompatible with other light guns, but praised the GunCon's extreme precision and accuracy, in particular when firing near the edge of the screen (a common trouble spot for light guns). Lead reviewer Crispin Boyer was also pleased with the low price of the GunCon/Time Crisis bundle. VG247 called GunCon 3's design "hideous".

== See also ==
- Jogcon
- NeGcon
- List of GunCon games
