= Resident Evil =

Japanese horror game series and media franchise

- Logo of the Resident Evil series, specifically as depicted in the Resident Evil 4 remake.
- Created by: Shinji Mikami; Tokuro Fujiwara
- Original work: Resident Evil (1996)
- Owner: Capcom
- Years: 1996–present

Print publications
- Novels: Novel list
- Comics: Comic list

Films and television
- Films: Live-action series; Animated film list
- Television series: Television list

Games
- Video games: Video game list

Official website
- game.capcom.com/residentevil/

Resident Evil, also known as Biohazard (バイオハザード, Baiohazādo) in Japan, is a Japanese horror game series and media franchise created by Capcom. It consists of survival horror, third-person shooter, and first-person games, with players typically surviving in environments inhabited by zombies and other mutated creatures. The franchise has expanded into media including a live-action film series, animated films, television series, comic books, novels, audio dramas, and merchandise. With over 218 million video game copies sold worldwide as of October 2026, Resident Evil is Capcom's best-selling franchise, the ninth best-selling video game franchise, the best‑selling horror game franchise, and one of the highest-grossing horror media franchises.

The first Resident Evil game was created by Shinji Mikami and Tokuro Fujiwara for PlayStation, and was released in 1996. It is credited with defining the survival horror genre and returning zombies to popular culture. With Resident Evil 4 (2005), the franchise shifted to more dynamic shooting action, popularizing the now-ubiquitous "over-the-shoulder" third-person view in action-adventure games. The franchise returned to survival horror with Resident Evil 7: Biohazard (2017) and Resident Evil Village (2021), which both used a first-person perspective. Capcom has also released four Resident Evil remakes: Resident Evil (2002), Resident Evil 2 (2019), Resident Evil 3 (2020) and Resident Evil 4 (2023), with a remake of Resident Evil – Code: Veronica (2000) releasing in 2027. The ninth and most recent main installment, Resident Evil Requiem, was released in 2026.

A live-action film adaptation, similarly titled Resident Evil was released in 2002, written and directed by Paul W. S. Anderson. It spawned a franchise comprising five sequels and two reboots, Welcome to Raccoon City (2021) directed by Johannes Roberts and Resident Evil (2026) written and directed by Zach Cregger. A television series was developed by Netflix and aired for one season in 2022. The first seven films received negative reviews, while the 2026 film garnered critical acclaim and became the highest-rated film based on a video game on both Rotten Tomatoes and Metacritic. The films have altogether grossed more than $1.6 billion, making Resident Evil the second highest-grossing video game film series and the third highest-grossing horror film series.

== History ==
Release timeline Major original releases in bold
1996	**Resident Evil**
1997
1998	**Resident Evil 2**
1999	**Resident Evil 3: Nemesis**
2000	Survivor
2000	**Resident Evil – Code: Veronica**
2001	Survivor 2 – Code: Veronica
2001	Gaiden
2002	Resident Evil (**remake**)
2002	**Resident Evil Zero**
2003	Dead Aim
2003	Outbreak
2004	Outbreak: File #2
2005	**Resident Evil 4**
2006
2007	The Umbrella Chronicles
2008
2009	**Resident Evil 5**
2009	The Darkside Chronicles
2010
2011	The Mercenaries 3D
2012	Revelations
2012	Operation Raccoon City
2012	**Resident Evil 6**
2013
2014
2015	Revelations 2
2016	Umbrella Corps
2017	**Resident Evil 7: Biohazard**
2018
2019	Resident Evil 2 (**remake**)
2020	Resident Evil 3 (**remake**)
2020	Resistance
2021	**Resident Evil Village**
2022	Re:Verse
2023	Resident Evil 4 (**remake**)
2024
2025
2026	**Resident Evil Requiem**
2027	Resident Evil Veronica (**remake**)

The development of the first Resident Evil, released as Biohazard in Japan, began in 1993 when Capcom's Tokuro Fujiwara told Shinji Mikami and other co-workers to create a game using elements from Fujiwara's 1989 game Sweet Home on the Family Computer (Famicom) in Japan. When in late 1994 marketing executives were setting up to release Biohazard in the United States, it was pointed out that securing the rights to the name Biohazard would be very difficult as a DOS game had been registered under that name, as well as a New York hardcore punk band called Biohazard. A contest was held among company personnel to choose a new name; this competition turned up Resident Evil, the name under which it was released in the west. Resident Evil made its debut on the PlayStation in 1996 and was ported to the Sega Saturn.

The first entry in the series was the first game to be dubbed a "survival horror", a term coined for the new genre it initiated, and its critical and commercial success led to the production of two sequels, Resident Evil 2 in 1998 and Resident Evil 3: Nemesis in 1999, both for the PlayStation. A port of Resident Evil 2 was released for the Nintendo 64. In addition, ports of all three were released for Windows. The next big game in the series, Resident Evil – Code: Veronica, was developed for the Dreamcast and released in 2000, followed by ports of Resident Evil 2 and Resident Evil 3: Nemesis. Resident Evil – Code: Veronica was rereleased for Dreamcast in Japan in an updated form as Code: Veronica Complete, which included slight changes, many of which revolved around story cutscenes. This updated version was ported to the PlayStation 2 and GameCube as Code: Veronica X.

Despite earlier announcements that the next game in the series would be released for the PlayStation 2, which resulted in the creation of an unrelated game, Devil May Cry, Mikami decided to make the series exclusively for the GameCube. The next three games in the series—a remake of the original Resident Evil and the prequel Resident Evil Zero, both released in 2002, as well as Resident Evil 4 (2005)—were all released initially for GameCube. Resident Evil 4 was later released for Windows, PlayStation 2, and Wii.

A trilogy of GunCon-compatible light gun games, the Gun Survivor series, featured first-person gameplay. The first, Resident Evil Survivor, was released in 2000 for the PlayStation and PC but received mediocre reviews. The subsequent games, Resident Evil Survivor 2 – Code: Veronica and Resident Evil: Dead Aim, fared somewhat better. Dead Aim is the fourth Gun Survivor game in Japan, with Gun Survivor 3 being the Dino Crisis spin-off Dino Stalker. In a similar vein, the Chronicles series features first-person gameplay, albeit on an on-rails path. Resident Evil: The Umbrella Chronicles was released in 2007 for the Wii, with a sequel, Resident Evil: The Darkside Chronicles, released in 2009 (both were ported to the PlayStation 3 in 2012).

Resident Evil Outbreak is an online game for the PlayStation 2, released in 2003, depicting a series of episodic storylines in Raccoon City set during the same period as Resident Evil 2 and Resident Evil 3: Nemesis. It was the first in the series and the first survival horror game to feature cooperative gameplay. It was followed by a sequel, Resident Evil Outbreak: File #2. Raccoon City is a metropolis located in the Arklay Mountains of the Midwestern United States that succumbed to the deadly T-virus outbreak and was consequently destroyed via a nuclear missile attack issued by the United States government. The town served as a critical junction for the series' progression as one of the main catalysts to Umbrella's downfall and the entry point for some of the series' most notable characters.

Resident Evil Gaiden is an action-adventure game for the Game Boy Color featuring a role-playing-style combat system. There have been several downloadable mobile games based on the Resident Evil series in Japan. Some of these mobile games have been released in North America and Europe through T-Mobile. At the Sony press conference during E3 2009, Resident Evil Portable was announced for the PlayStation Portable, described as a new game being developed with "the PSP Go in mind" and "totally different for a Resident Evil game". No further announcements have been made, and the game is considered to have been canceled.

In 2009, Resident Evil 5 was released for PlayStation 3, Windows and Xbox 360, becoming the best selling game of the franchise despite mixed fan reception. Capcom revealed the third-person shooter Resident Evil: Operation Raccoon City, which was developed by Slant Six Games for the PlayStation 3, Xbox 360 and Windows and released in March 2012. A survival horror game for the Nintendo 3DS, Resident Evil: Revelations, was released in February 2012. In October of the same year, the next numbered entry in the main series, Resident Evil 6, was released to mixed reviews, but enthusiastic pre-order sales.

In 2013, producer Masachika Kawata said the Resident Evil franchise would return to focus on elements of horror and suspense over action, adding that "survival horror as a genre is never going to be on the same level, financially, as shooters and much more popular, mainstream games. At the same time, I think we need to have the confidence to put money behind these projects, and it doesn't mean we can't focus on what we need to do as a survival horror game to meet fan's needs." Resident Evil: Revelations 2, an episodic game set between Resident Evil 5 and Resident Evil 6, was released in March 2015. A series of team-based multiplayer games were developed beginning with the poorly received Umbrella Corps, which was released in June 2016. Resident Evil: Resistance was released in April 2020, followed by Resident Evil Re:Verse in October 2022, with both available for free to those who bought Resident Evil 3 and Village respectively.

Built on the newly developed RE Engine, the series continued its shift back towards more horror elements. The next main installment, Resident Evil 7: Biohazard, was released for Windows, PlayStation 4 and Xbox One in January 2017. Set in a dilapidated mansion in Louisiana, the game uses a first-person perspective and emphasizes horror and exploration over action, unlike previous installments. The first-person perspective continued in the eighth main installment, Resident Evil Village. Released in May 2021, the game, set in a mysterious European village, is a direct sequel to Resident Evil 7: Biohazard although it incorporates more action elements inspired from Resident Evil 4. The game also marked the franchise's debut on PlayStation 5 and Xbox Series X/S. The ninth main installment, Resident Evil Requiem, was released in February 2026.

A series of remakes of older entries began in 2019 with a remake of Resident Evil 2 being released for the PlayStation 4, Windows, and Xbox One. The remake outsold the original game within a year, selling over five million copies. Capcom revealed a remake of Resident Evil 3: Nemesis in December 2019, known as Resident Evil 3. It was released in April 2020. A remake of Resident Evil 4 was released on March 24, 2023, for PlayStation 4, PlayStation 5, Xbox Series X/S and Windows. A remake of Code: Veronica, Resident Evil Veronica, is set for release in 2027. Resident Evil: Survival Unit, a strategy game by Aniplex Inc. and Joycity Corporation, was released for iOS and Android in November 2025.

== Story overview ==
The early Resident Evil games focused on the Umbrella Corporation, an international pharmaceutical company that secretly develops mutagenic viruses to further their "bio-organic weapons" (BOW) research. The company's viruses can transform humans into mindless zombies while also mutating plants and animals into horrifying monstrosities. The Umbrella Corporation uses its vast resources to effectively control Raccoon City, a fictional midwestern American city. In the original Resident Evil, members of an elite police task force, Special Tactics and Rescue Service (STARS), are lured to a derelict mansion on the outskirts of Raccoon City. The STARS team is mostly decimated by zombies and other BOWs, leaving only a handful of survivors, including Chris Redfield, Jill Valentine, and Albert Wesker. Chris and Jill explore the zombie-infested mansion and uncover a secret underground Umbrella research facility. Wesker reveals himself to be a double agent for Umbrella and betrays his comrades. However, Wesker is seemingly murdered by a Tyrant, a special BOW that is the culmination of the Umbrella Corporation's research.

Chris and Jill escape the mansion, but Raccoon City's officials ridicule their testimony due to Umbrella's influence. Meanwhile, a separate viral outbreak occurs in another Umbrella research facility underneath Raccoon City. Most of the city's residents are infected and become zombies. Resident Evil 2 introduces two new protagonists, Leon S. Kennedy, a rookie police officer and Claire Redfield, the younger sister of Chris. Leon and Claire arrive in Raccoon City amidst the chaos of the viral outbreak. Leon is aided by Ada Wong, a spy posing as an FBI agent, while Claire rescues Sherry Birkin, the daughter of two prominent Umbrella researchers. At the same time, Jill makes her escape from the city in Resident Evil 3: Nemesis. A new Tyrant, Nemesis, who Umbrella deploys to eliminate all surviving STARS members, relentlessly pursues her. The U.S. Government destroys Raccoon City with a nuclear missile strike to sterilize the viral outbreak. Leon, Claire, Sherry, Ada, and Jill escape the city before its eradication. Claire continues to look for Chris, whereas Leon is recruited to work for the U.S. Government. Resident Evil – Code: Veronica follows Claire as she escapes from a prison camp in the Southern Ocean and reunites with Chris at an Umbrella research facility in Antarctica, while Wesker is revealed to be alive. Resident Evil 4, set six years after the Raccoon City incident, focuses on Leon as he tries to rescue the U.S. President's daughter from a cult in Spain.

A government investigation into the Umbrella Corporation reveals its involvement in the Raccoon City disaster and leads to the company's dissolution. Despite the downfall of the Umbrella Corporation, its research and BOWs continue to proliferate across the black market, fueling the rise of bioterrorism. Chris and Jill establish the Bioterrorism Security Assessment Alliance (BSAA) to combat these ever-growing threats on a global scale. Wesker is involved in the development of new potent viral agents and BOWs. In Resident Evil 5, Wesker seeks to unleash a highly mutagenic virus that will infect all of humanity. Chris and the BSAA confront and kill Wesker in Africa before he can fulfill his mission. Resident Evil 6 features Leon and Chris meeting for the first time in the video game series. The two work separately to triage bioterrorist attacks in the United States, Eastern Europe, and China. They are assisted by Sherry, Wesker's illegitimate son Jake Muller, Ada, and members of the BSAA and the U.S. government.

Resident Evil 7: Biohazard and Resident Evil Village feature a new protagonist, Ethan Winters, who becomes entangled in a bioterrorism incident while searching for his missing wife. He encounters Chris and the BSAA, who help him rescue his wife and defeat Eveline, a powerful BOW. Ethan, Mia, and their newborn daughter, Rosemary, are relocated to Eastern Europe but are abducted by a cult. Ethan ultimately sacrifices himself to destroy a fungal colony being weaponized by bioterrorists and save his family. Resident Evil Requiem introduces a new protagonist, Grace Ashcroft, whose investigation into a syndrome affecting survivors of the Raccoon City incident leads her into the city's ruins to uncover a new conspiracy, aided by Leon and Sherry.

== Common elements ==
The series draws on gothic, science-fiction and folk horror themes, with settings including mansions, laboratories and isolated villages. The balance between these elements varies between installments, with some placing greater emphasis on action and others on avoiding enemies and conserving resources.

Biological infection and experimentation recur throughout the games. Infectious agents include the t-virus and G-virus, the Las Plagas parasites and the Mold; these transform humans and other organisms into hostile creatures. Records encountered during exploration provide information about earlier events. In Resident Evil 7, playable videotapes place the player in another character's role and reveal locations, dangers and information relevant to later puzzles.

=== Characters and creatures ===
Promotional artwork created by Capcom for Resident Evil's 30th anniversary featuring some of the series' main characters. From left to right: Leon S. Kennedy, Claire Redfield, Chris Redfield, Jill Valentine, Grace Ashcroft, and Ada Wong.

Recurring protagonists include Chris Redfield, Jill Valentine, Leon S. Kennedy and Claire Redfield. Their stories follow the survivors of earlier outbreaks as they investigate biological weapons and subsequent attacks. Other recurring characters include Ada Wong and Albert Wesker, whose activities connect several of the games' conspiracies and conflicts. Enemies include zombies and deliberately developed biological weapons such as Tyrants. Mr. X and Nemesis, two such Tyrant characters, pursue the protagonists through their environments, interrupting exploration and forcing confrontations or escape.

=== Gameplay ===
The Resident Evil games combine horror, exploration, combat, puzzle-solving and the management of limited supplies. There has been a variety of control schemes and gameplay mechanics introduced or adapted with each new instalment in the series. Puzzle-solving has figured prominently throughout the series.

==== Control schemes and VR gameplay ====
Early Resident Evil games use "tank controls", whereby pressing up on the game controller moves the character in the direction they face, down reverses them, and left and right rotates them. This differs from many games, in which characters move in the direction players push from the perspective of the camera. Some critics have posited that the control scheme is intentionally clumsy, meant to enhance stress and exacerbate difficulty. Mikami felt the use of fixed camera perspectives and tank controls made the game scarier.

Resident Evil 3: Nemesis saw some action-oriented additions. These included a 180 degree turn and dodge command that, according to GameSpot, "hinted at a new direction that the series would go in". Later games in the series, like Resident Evil 4, introduced a more fluid over-the-shoulder third-person camera instead of a fixed camera for each room, while Resident Evil 7 and Resident Evil Village are played from the first-person perspective.

Resident Evil 4 saw significant changes to the established gameplay, including switching from fixed camera perspectives to a tracking camera, and more action-oriented gameplay and mechanics. This was complemented by an abundance of ammunition and revised aiming and melee mechanics. Some critics claimed that this overhauled control scheme "made the game less scary." The next two games in the franchise furthered the action-oriented mechanics: Resident Evil 5 featured cooperative play and added strafing, while Resident Evil 6 allowed players to move while aiming and shooting for the first time, fully abandoning the series' signature tank controls.

Resident Evil 7 is the first main Resident Evil game to use the first-person perspective and to use virtual reality. It drew comparisons to modern survival horror games such as Outlast and PT. The eighth main installment, Resident Evil Village, also features a first-person perspective and included a VR mode added post launch. A VR version of Resident Evil 4 was released on the Oculus Quest 2 on October 21, 2021. On December 8, 2023 a free DLC for the remake of Resident Evil 4 was released that added a VR mode using PlayStation VR2 to the PlayStation 5 version of the game.

==== Exploration and inventory management ====
Exploration involves finding keys, examining objects and collecting information needed to open routes through interconnected environments. Safe rooms provide respite from enemies and serve as bases for exploration. They are associated with quieter musical themes and typewriters used to save progress. Healing items include herbs, which can be combined to improve their effects. Limited inventory space requires players to choose which weapons, ammunition and healing supplies to carry. Storage boxes allow equipment to be left behind for later retrieval, while the attaché-case inventory introduced in Resident Evil 4 makes arranging differently sized objects a spatial puzzle.

== Other media ==
The Resident Evil franchise features video games and tie-in merchandise and products, including various live-action and animated films, comic books, and novels.

=== Films ===
==== Live-action films ====
The live-action film series logo from 2002 to 2016.

From 2002 to 2016, six live-action Resident Evil films were produced, all written and produced by Paul W. S. Anderson. The films do not follow the games' premise but feature some game characters. The series' protagonist is Alice, an original character created for the films portrayed by Milla Jovovich. Despite a negative reaction from critics, the live-action film series has made over $1 billion worldwide. They are, to date, the only video game adaptations to increase the amount of money made with each successive film. The series holds the record for the "Most Live-Action Film Adaptations of a Video Game" in the 2012 Guinness World Records Gamer's Edition, which also described it as "the most successful movie series to be based on a video game."

A reboot, Resident Evil: Welcome to Raccoon City, was released on November 24, 2021, with Johannes Roberts as writer and director. In January 2025, it was reported that Zach Cregger was writing and directing a film reboot, Resident Evil, co-produced by Constantin Film and PlayStation Productions. In March 2025, Sony Pictures won a bidding war to secure the rights to the Resident Evil franchise, including its upcoming untitled project, with Columbia Pictures serving as the film's new distributor. Sony set a release date of September 18, 2026, for the project. In June 2025, it was reported that the project had registered to film in the Czech Republic. On August 11, 2025, Austin Abrams was confirmed to star in the film. Cregger said that he had not seen the previous Resident Evil films and that his film will be more closely based on the video games, particularly Resident Evil 2, Resident Evil 3: Nemesis, and Resident Evil 4.

==== Animated films ====
The first computer animated film for the franchise was Biohazard 4D-Executer. It was a short 3D film produced for Japanese theme parks and did not feature any characters from the game. Starting in 2008, a series of feature-length computer-animated films have been released. These films take place in the same continuity as the games and feature characters such as Leon Kennedy, Claire Redfield, Ada Wong, Chris Redfield, Jill Valentine and Rebecca Chambers.

=== Television ===
Resident Evil: Infinite Darkness, a four-part CG anime series, premiered on July 8, 2021, on Netflix. Starring the Resident Evil 2 protagonists Leon S. Kennedy and Claire Redfield, the series features both uncovering a worldwide plot. The series was released on July 8, 2021 on Netflix.

Resident Evil premiered on July 14, 2022, on Netflix. An eight-episode live-action series, two plotlines set in 2022 and 2036 follow Albert Wesker and his daughters navigating Umbrella's experiments in New Raccoon City.

=== Merchandise ===
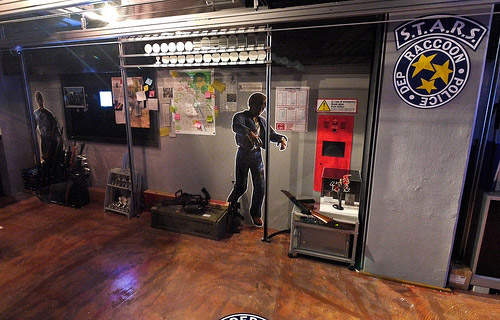
Resident Evil theme restaurant

Over the years, various toy companies have acquired the Resident Evil license, with each producing their own unique line of Resident Evil action figures or models. These include, but are not limited to, Toy Biz, Palisades Toys, NECA, and Hot Toys.

Tokyo Marui also produced replicas of the guns used in the Resident Evil series in the form of gas blow-back airsoft guns. Some models included the STARS Beretta featured in Resident Evil 3, and the Desert Eagle in a limited edition that came with other memorabilia in a wooden case, along with the Gold Lugers from Code: Veronica and the "Samurai Edge" pistol from the Resident Evil remake. Other merchandise includes an energy drink called "T-virus Antidote".

Resident Evil Archives is a reference guide of the Resident Evil series written by staff members of Capcom. It was translated into English and published by BradyGames. The guide describes and summarizes all of the key events that occur in Resident Evil Zero, Resident Evil, Resident Evil 2, Resident Evil 3: Nemesis, and Code: Veronica. The main plot analysis also contains character relationship charts, artwork, item descriptions, and file transcripts for all five games. A second Archives book was later released in December 2011 and covers Resident Evil 4, Resident Evil 5, the new scenarios detailed in Resident Evil: The Umbrella Chronicles and Resident Evil: The Darkside Chronicles, and the 2008 CGI movie, Resident Evil: Degeneration. The second Archives volume was also translated by Capcom and published by BradyGames.

A Resident Evil theme restaurant called Biohazard Cafe & Grill S.T.A.R.S. opened in Tokyo in 2012. Halloween Horror Nights 2013, held at Universal Orlando, featured a haunted house titled Resident Evil: Escape from Raccoon City, based on Resident Evil 2 and Resident Evil 3: Nemesis.

=== Novels ===
The first Resident Evil novel was Hiroyuki Ariga's novella Biohazard: The Beginning, published in 1997 as a portion of the book The True Story of Biohazard, which was given away as a pre-order bonus with the Sega Saturn version of Biohazard. The story serves as a prelude to the original Resident Evil, in which Chris investigates the disappearance of his missing friend, Billy Rabbitson.

S. D. Perry has written novelizations of the first five games, as well as two original novels taking place between games. The novels often take liberties with the games' plot by exploring events occurring outside and beyond the games. This often meant that the games would later contradict the books on a few occasions. One notable addition from the novels is the original character Trent, who often served as a mysterious behind-the-scenes string-puller who aided the main characters. Perry's novels were translated and released in Japan with new cover arts by Wolfina. Perry's novels, particularly The Umbrella Conspiracy, also alluded to events in Biohazard: The Beginning, such as the disappearance of Billy Rabbitson and Brian Irons' bid to run for Mayor. A reprinting of Perry's novels with new cover artwork began in 2012 to coincide with the release of Resident Evil: Retribution and its respective novelization.

There are a trilogy of original Biohazard novels in Japan. Hokkai no Yōjū (北海の妖獣; lit. "The Strange Beast of the North Sea") was published in 1998 and was written by Kyū Asakura and the staff of Flagship. Two additional novels were published in 2002, To the Liberty by Sudan Kimura and Rose Blank by Tadashi Aizawa. While no official English translation of these novels has been published yet, the last two books were translated into German and published in 2006.

Novelizations of the films Genesis, Apocalypse, and Extinction were written by Keith DeCandido. Afterlife did not receive a novelization due to Capcom's decision to discontinue working with Pocket Books, who had been their primary source of publishing books up to that point, Capcom would later make Titan Books their primary publisher going forth. Retribution was written by John Shirley, while The Final Chapter was written by Tim Waggoner. Genesis was published over two years after that film's release and coincided with the publication of Apocalypse, Genesis being marketed as a prequel to Apocalypse, while the Extinction novel was released in late July 2007, two months before the film's release. The Final Chapter was published in December 2016 alongside the film's theatrical release. There was also a Japanese novelization of the first film, unrelated to DeCandido's version, written by Osamu Makino. Makino also wrote two novels based on the game Resident Evil: The Umbrella Chronicles. The books are a two-part direct novelization of the game and are published in Japanese and German only. The first novel, titled Biohazard: The Umbrella Chronicles Side A in Japan and Resident Evil: The Umbrella Chronicles 1 in Germany, was released on December 22, 2007. The second novel, titled Biohazard: The Umbrella Chronicles Side B in Japan and Resident Evil: The Umbrella Chronicles 2 in Germany, was published in January 2008.

=== Comics ===
In 1997, Marvel Comics published a single-issue prologue comic based on the original Resident Evil, released through a promotional giveaway alongside the original PlayStation game.

In 1998, WildStorm began producing a monthly comic book series based on the first two games, Resident Evil: The Official Comic Magazine, which lasted five issues. The first four issues were published by Image, while Wildstorm themselves published the fifth and final issue. Each issue was a compilation of short stories that were both adaptations of events from the games and related side stories. Like the Perry novels, the comics also explored events occurring beyond Resident Evil 2 (the latest game during the series' publication) and thus were contradicted by later games. Wildstorm also published a four-issue miniseries, Resident Evil: Fire & Ice, which depicted the ordeal of Charlie Team, a third STARS team created specifically for the comic. In 2009, Wildstorm reprinted Fire & Ice in a trade paperback collection.

In Hong Kong, there has been officially licensed Biohazard manhua adaptations of Biohazard 0 by publisher Yulang Group, Biohazard 2 by Kings Fountain, Biohazard 3 Supplemental Edition by Cao Zhihao and, Biohazard 3 The Last Escape, and Biohazard Code: Veronica by Lee Chung Hing published by Tinhangse Publishing. The Code: Veronica manhua was translated into English, formatted to look like an American comic and distributed by WildStorm as a series of four graphic novel collections.

In 2009, Wildstorm began publishing a Resident Evil comic book prequel to Resident Evil 5, which centers on two original members of the BSAA, Mina Gere and Holiday Sugarman. Written by Ricardo Sanchez and illustrated by Kevin Sharpe and Jim Clark, the first issue was published on March 11, 2009. On November 11, 2009, the third issue was released, and the fourth was released March 24, 2010. The sixth and final book was finally published in February 2011.

=== Plays ===
In the summer of 2000, Bioroid: Year Zero was performed in Japan. It was a musical horror-comedy but took the perspective of the infected. Super Eccentric Theater put on the production under the direction of Osamu Yagihashi. The stage play was performed from early July to late August. Biohazard The Stage was released in Japan in 2015. The play focused on Chris Redfield and Rebecca Chambers as Philosophy University in Australia is experiencing a bioterrorist attack. The production was handled by Avex Live Creative and Ace Crew Entertainment, under supervision from Capcom. The following year, Musical Biohazard ~Voice of Gaia~ was released in September. It was produced by Umeda Arts Theater by director G2 and composer, Shunsuke Wada. Biohazard the Experience was the second Resident Evil play produced by Avex Live Creative and Ace Crew Entertainment. The story is set in 2015 and follows a cast of thirteen survivors who were abducted and woke up in a mansion during an outbreak.

== Reception and legacy ==
Most of the games in the prominent Resident Evil series have been released to positive reviews. Some of the games, most notably Resident Evil, Resident Evil 2 and Resident Evil 4, have been bestowed with multiple Game of the Year honors and often placed on lists of the best video games ever made.

In 1999, Next Generation listed the Resident Evil series as number 13 on their "Top 50 Games of All Time", commenting that, "Flawless graphics, excellent music, and a top-notch storyline all combined to make a game of unparalleled atmosphere and suspense." In 2012, Complex ranked Resident Evil at number 22 on the list of the best video game franchises. That same year, G4tv called it "one of the most successful series in gaming history."

=== Commercial performance ===
By December 2022, around 135 million Resident Evil games had been sold. The first two Resident Evil games had collectively sold approximately 11 million units worldwide by March 1999. By early 2001, the series had sold 17 million units worldwide, earning more than $600 million. By 2011, it had sold about 46 million copies and was estimated to have grossed at least $1.3 billion. It is recognized by Guinness World Records as the best-selling survival horror series, with Resident Evil 2 remake being the best-selling survival horror game as of 2023. Seven of the top ten best-selling horror games in North America are Resident Evil games.

The 2023 Resident Evil 4 remake sold more than three million copies in its first two days of release. It sold four million copies in its first two weeks, making it one of the fastest-selling Resident Evil games. In Japan, it was the best-selling retail game in its first week, selling 89,662 copies on PlayStation 5 and 85,371 on PlayStation 4.

The Resident Evil film series was the highest-grossing film series based on video games by 2012. By 2011, the films had grossed over $600 million at the box office, bringing the franchise's estimated revenue to at least more than $1.9 billion in combined video game sales and box office gross up until then. As of 2020, the films have grossed more than $1.3 billion in box office and home video sales. The success of the video games and films have made Resident Evil the highest-grossing franchise in the horror and zombie genres.

=== Cultural impact ===
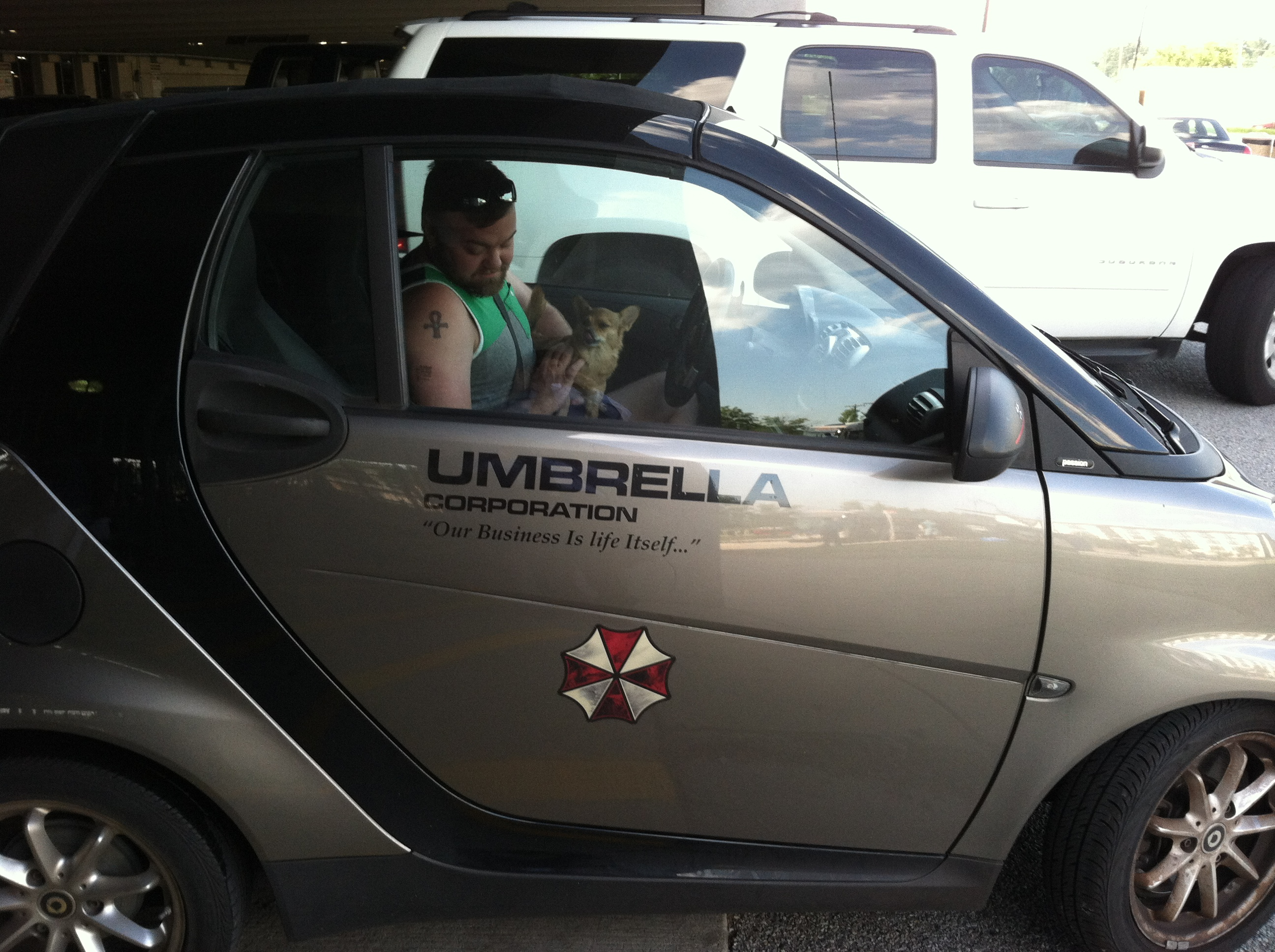
An example of the cultural impact of the Resident Evil media franchise on popular culture; the Umbrella Corporation's logo is said to have become a recognisable element of the franchise.

GameSpot listed the original Resident Evil as one of the fifteen most influential video games of all time. It is credited with defining and popularizing the survival horror genre of games. It is also credited with taking video games in a cinematic direction with its B-movie style cut-scenes, including live-action full-motion video (FMV) footage. Its live-action opening, however, was controversial; it became one of the first action games to receive the "Mature 17+" (M) rating from the Entertainment Software Rating Board (ESRB), despite the opening cutscene being censored in North America.

The Resident Evil franchise is credited with sparking a revival of the zombie genre in popular culture, leading to a renewed interest in zombie films during the 2000s. Resident Evil also helped redefine the zombie genre, playing an important role in its shift from supernatural themes to scientific themes by using science to explain the origins of zombies. According to Kim Newman in the book Nightmare Movies (2011), "the zombie revival began in the Far East" mainly due to the 1996 Japanese zombie games Resident Evil and The House of the Dead. George A. Romero, in 2013, said it was the video games Resident Evil and House of the Dead "more than anything else" that popularised his zombie concept in early 21st-century popular culture. In a 2015 interview with Huffington Post, screenwriter-director Alex Garland credited the Resident Evil series as a primary influence on his script for the horror film 28 Days Later (2002), and credited the first Resident Evil game for revitalizing the zombie genre. Screenwriter Edgar Wright cited Resident Evil 2 as a primary influence on his zombie comedy film Shaun of the Dead (2004), with the film's star and co-writer Simon Pegg also crediting the first game with starting the zombie revival in popular culture. The Walking Dead comic book creator Robert Kirkman cited Resident Evil as his favorite zombie game, while The Walking Dead television series director Greg Nicotero credited Resident Evil and The House of the Dead with introducing the zombie genre "to a whole generation of younger people who didn't grow up watching Night of the Living Dead and Dawn of the Dead."

The Resident Evil Apocalypse zombies were conceptualized and choreographed by Sharon B. Moore and Derek Aasland. Through script analysis and movement research, a "scientific logic" was devised for the T-virus accounting for each Zombie behavior envisioned in Paul W. S. Anderson's script. Sharon B. Moore and Derek Aasland then wrote the so-called Undead Bible - a Handbook for the Undead - used as the guide for the nearly 1000 cast under the choreographic department (stunt performers, actors, dancers, extras) to ensure the Undead physicality was performed in a unified way across the picture. The Stunt and Core teams participated in the "Undead Bootcamp". See also 2007 Documentary Undead Bootcamp starring producer Jeremy Bolt, director Alexander Witt, and choreographers Sharon B. Moore and Derek Aasland.

On the DVD Featurette 'Resident Evil; Game Over' Apocalypse director Alexander Witt said the zombies needed to be "more aggressive and more dangerous" than the original film, so they were created by the film's choreographers Sharon B. Moore and Derek Aasland as "liquid zombie[s]' in terms of their relentless forward motion: unstoppable, flowing around any kind of resistance, and then rushing in on the final attack. This is also detailed in the book Biopunk Dystopias: Genetic Engineering, Society, and Science Fiction (Lars Schmeink, 2016, p. 214).

Additionally, the first Resident Evil film adaptation also contributed to the revival of zombie films, with the success of the film and the games resulting in zombies achieving greater mainstream prominence and several zombie films being greenlit, such as the video game film adaptation House of the Dead (2003), the remake Dawn of the Dead (2004) and Romero's Land of the Dead (2005). The Resident Evil films, 28 Days Later and the Dawn of the Dead remake all set box office records for the zombie genre, reaching levels of commercial success not seen since the original Dawn of the Dead (1978). They were followed by other zombie films such as 28 Weeks Later (2007), Zombieland (2009), Cockneys vs Zombies (2012), and World War Z (2013), as well as zombie-themed graphic novels and television shows such as The Walking Dead and The Returned, and books such as World War Z (2006), Pride and Prejudice and Zombies (2009) and Warm Bodies (2010). The zombie revival trend was popular across different media up until the mid-2010s. Since then, zombie films have declined in popularity during the late 2010s, but zombie video games have remained popular, as seen with the commercial success of the Resident Evil 2 remake and Days Gone in 2019.

== See also ==
- Genetic engineering in fiction
- List of fictional diseases
- List of zombie video games
- Dino Crisis, another horror series by Capcom
- Dead Rising, another zombie-themed series by Capcom
- Devil May Cry, another series by Capcom, initially conceived as a Resident Evil game
- Onimusha, another series by Capcom with similar gameplay, initially conceived as a Resident Evil game
- The Evil Within, other horror game made by Shinji Mikami
