= Survivor 2 =

Survivor 2 may refer to:

- Resident Evil Survivor 2 – Code: Veronica, a 2001 video game
- Survivor: The Australian Outback, the second season of the American reality television series Survivor
