= Rescue Shot =

2000 video game

- PAL cover art
- Developer: Now Production
- Publishers: JP: Namco; EU: Sony Computer Entertainment
- Directors: Satoshi Norimatsu; Yasushi Ono
- Producers: Hideharu Sato; Junichi Ohno
- Designers: Sho Asano; Masanosuke Shimizu
- Programmers: Hideki Kurosaki; Takashi Ohhira; Takayuki Taniguchi; Shigeru Sato
- Artists: Toshiya Takagi; Chikako Nishizaki; Kazue Miyahara; Katsuhiko Ootani; Mari Jinkawa; Masako Hashimoto; Yoshiaki Mizukami
- Composers: Kenji Matsuo; Masashi Sugiyama; Ayako Yamaguchi
- Platform: PlayStation
- Release: JP: January 20, 2000; EU: April 7, 2000
- Genre: Light gun
- Modes: Single-player, multiplayer

Rescue Shot (Note: Known in Japan as Rescue Shot Bubibo (レスキューショット ブービーぼー, Resukyū Shotto Būbī Bo).) is a 2000 light-gun shooter video game developed by Now Production and published by Namco for the PlayStation. Compatible with the controller, GunCon and the PlayStation Mouse, the title is non-violent and aimed at younger players, hence being more forgiving of poor accuracy than others in the genre. Players watch over the game's hero, Bo, as he absentmindedly makes his way through each location, dealing with enemies and manoeuvering him past dangers.

== Gameplay ==
Players assume the role of a mysterious power caused by the dream fragment protecting Bo, a harmless rabbit who has lost his memory after falling from a cliff due to the mischievous Bully Brothers, a group of five colored bats. Bo travels to the end of each level to a given world, oblivious to danger, searching the other four dream fragments he needs to restore it granting a wish. Bo also meets three secondary characters: Hunter (a fox rookie detective and also his friend), Trixie (a dishonest blonde girl), and Earl Grey (a famous thief sought by Hunter).

Enemies and bosses attack Bo throughout the game, the player must repel them. Obstacles and traps must be destroyed by being shot or bypassed by shooting Bo in the head or rump, neither of which harms him. Shooting Bo in the head causes him to fall over, avoiding any head-height attacks or obstacles and stopping him from moving for a few seconds. Shooting instead Bo in the rump causes him to leap forwards, potentially leaping over traps and obstacles. Standard rounds of ammunition are infinite, while stronger ones represented by acorns act as explosives but are in limited supply.

Bo's health meter decreases by one point whenever he suffers an attack or takes damage (initially starting with six notches), and if it fully depletes, the game ends. Bo can replenish his health by consuming any fruit he encounters along his journey, but caution is needed to avoid poisonous mushrooms that can harm him. These mushrooms must be shot and destroyed before Bo inadvertently eats them. Additionally, collecting ten dream fragments — available in small and large sizes (the latter worth five fragments) — grants an extra notch, allowing the player to extend the gauge to a maximum of twenty notches.

Rescue Shot comprises four areas and a total of ten levels, covering fantasy locations such as a magic kingdom, a castle and a mineshaft with trolleys, alongside a futuristic city with clockwork robots. Bonus targets are spread throughout the game's stages, allowing players to increase their score, as well as acorn bullets and dream fragments which are collected by the player shooting them.

After each level, the player's result is broken down for: scores gained along its course, firing accurance, shooting apart enemies and bonus targets, and completing it quickly.

== Reception ==
The Australian Broadcasting Corporation's reviewer awarded the game 2 out of 5, citing the brevity of the game and lack of replay value since the game has no unlockable extras and progression is linear.

GameSpot's James Mielke stated that the game was more like the Point Blank series rather than Time Crisis due to "focusing more on the crazy game dynamics of its unique gameworld", in GameSpot's preview. He also commented that "it seems as if Namco is determined to make sure its coolest peripheral gets some usage", referring to the GunCon.

In Japan, Famitsu magazine scored the game a 30 out of 40.
