= Dino Stalker =

2002 video game

- North American box art by Shinkiro
- Developer: TOSE
- Publisher: Capcom
- Director: Eiro Shirahama
- Producer: Tatsuya Minami
- Artists: Yoshihiro Ono; Shinkiro
- Writers: Noboru Sugimura; Yasuyuki Suzuki
- Composers: Hiroshi Nakajima; Tomoko Matsumoto
- Series: Dino Crisis; Gun Survivor
- Platform: PlayStation 2
- Release: JP: June 27, 2002; NA: September 17, 2002; EU: September 20, 2002
- Genre: Light gun shooter
- Mode: Single-player

Dino Stalker (Note: Known in Japan as Gun Survivor 3: Dino Crisis (Japanese: ガンサバイバー3 ディノクライシス, Hepburn: Gan Sabaibā Surī Dino Kuraishisu)) is a 2002 light gun shooter video game developed by TOSE and published by Capcom exclusively for the PlayStation 2. It is an offshoot of the Resident Evil light gun shooter games, but based on the story of the Dino Crisis series. Though it can be played by other means, a light gun is recommended, as the game is one in a number of Capcom games that try to bridge the gap between light gun games and traditional games that allow the player greater range of control over their movements in the game.

Dino Stalker is the third entry in the Capcom's Gun Survivor series after Resident Evil Survivor 2 – Code: Veronica. Although the Gun Survivor games are an offshoot of the Resident Evil series, Dino Stalker is the only game in the series without any ties to Resident Evil (with the exception of two easter eggs in Stage 5, the "woman drawing water" statue and an Umbrella building). It was followed by Resident Evil: Dead Aim.

== Gameplay ==
Dino Stalker is a first-person shooter in which the player must use various weapons to defend against dinosaurs while progressing through the game. Dino Stalker supports the optional use of the GunCon light gun accessory. The player can use a variety of weapons throughout the game, including bazookas, machine guns, and shotguns, but can only carry one weapon at a time. The game takes place across various landscapes, including desert and jungle. A two-player mode is unlocked upon completion of the game.

The game's storyline focuses on Mike Wired, a World War II pilot. After being shot down during combat over the Atlantic, Mike is transported into the dinosaur-populated future from Dino Crisis 2.

== Plot ==
Mike Wired, a World War II era fighter pilot is about to die in the sky in 1943, as bullets approach him before he can parachute to safety. Mike mysteriously somehow ends up being transported to a time with flying prehistoric reptiles, which he manages to kill. He meets Paula, a survivor from Dino Crisis 2 who speaks some English but is not able to speak long sentences. Traversing through the various stages under the guidance of Paula's father, Dylan, Mike defeats many different groups of savage dinosaurs using a special gun he gained, finally battling and defeating their intelligent leader, Trinity, which controlled the other dinosaurs. But despite falling in love with Paula, Mike must go back to just before his imminent death. Paula then edits the timescale to make the bullets vanish to prevent Mike from dying, and he is rescued by men on a boat, realizing that Paula was the one who saved him.

== Reception ==
Reception

Aggregate score
Aggregator	Score
Metacritic	50/100

Review scores
Publication	Score
Edge	6/10
Electronic Gaming Monthly	5.5/10
Eurogamer	6/10
Famitsu	8/10, 7/10, 8/10, 7/10
Game Informer	7.25/10
GamePro	3/5
GameRevolution	D+
GameSpot	4.6/10
GameSpy	2/5
GameZone	8.4/10
IGN	4/10
Official U.S. PlayStation Magazine	3.5/5

Dino Stalker received "mixed" reviews, according to video game review aggregator website Metacritic. On release, Famitsu gave the game a score of 30 out of 40 in Japan.

Douglass C. Perry of IGN criticized the game's controls: "After the first mission, your hand is in pain. The Carpel Tunnel syndrome you didn't have before throbs in fiery extended agony as if to say hello, and you have just started. [...] In the dozen-plus levels you play through, the slow-paced, awkward control is not only annoying but it hurts you. [...] But at least there is some comic relief, and for the pure sake of flat-out lunacy, this game may be worth your while." Perry also criticized the game's poor graphics, writing that it "looks like it was designed as a PlayStation game and that it only recently made the transition to PlayStation 2. [...] It's an average looking game at best, and that's putting it nicely."

Ryan Davis of GameSpot called the game's premise "bizarre and convoluted" with "not a lot of coherence." Davis criticized the game's selectable control schemes. Playing exclusively with the GunCon 2, Davis wrote that "using a single hand to move and shoot is difficult and will wear out your arm more quickly than your average light-gun game." Davis also criticized the alternative method of using a standard DualShock controller: "The targeting reticle is far too sensitive, and you'll often find yourself dealing with bouts of overcorrection while trying to draw a bead on a dino." Davis noted that the best option was to utilize both the DualShock and the GunCon 2 simultaneously, "But even this configuration does not compensate completely for the game's inherently slow movement or the inability to look up or down, and you'll spend an equal amount of time-fighting the controls as you will fighting dinosaurs." Davis also criticized the game's poor graphics, and wrote that the only notable sound effect throughout the game "is the 'reload' command you'll hear whenever you're out of bullets, and this is only because the computer voice noticeably mispronounces it." Davis concluded that the game would have been "infinitely more playable had Capcom discarded the Gun Survivor control scheme and just left the movement control on rails, like all other light-gun games. But with its needlessly frustrating control scheme intact, Dino Stalker's appeal is incredibly limited. Though the game is loosely affiliated with the Dino Crisis games, there's not a lot here to draw fans of that series, and with several superior light-gun games available on the PlayStation 2, there's little reason for anyone without a masochistic streak to play this game."

Louis Bedigian of GameZone praised the music and graphics and wrote that the control scheme "isn't bad, but it does take some getting used to. It's worth getting used to though, because this is the best dino-hunting game I've played since Dino Crisis 2." Tom Bramwell of Eurogamer called it "easily the best yet" in the Gun Survivor series, and praised the game for "some stunning environments," but criticized its short length and some of the "rather bland" dinosaur designs.
