= Gunfighter II: Revenge of Jesse James =

2003 video game

- Developer(s): Rebellion Developments
- Publisher(s): Ubi Soft
- Platform(s): PlayStation 2
- Release: EU: March 14, 2003
- Genre(s): Rail shooter
- Mode(s): Single-player, multiplayer

Gunfighter II: Revenge of Jesse James is a light gun shooter video game developed by Rebellion Developments and published by Ubi Soft for the PlayStation 2. It is the sequel to the 2001 game Gunfighter: The Legend of Jesse James. It is compatible with the GunCon 2 controller (G-Con 2 in Europe). The game's plot is set in the American Old West. The game's protagonist is Jesse James, an American outlaw who lived in the 19th century.

== Gameplay ==
Gameplay is very similar to the original installment. The player takes control of the main character's weapon in a first-person perspective. While the computer controls the character's movement, the player should take out all of the enemies in a limited time.
