= Endgame (video game) =

2002 video game

- European cover art
- Developer: Cunning Developments
- Publisher: Empire Interactive
- Engine: RenderWare
- Platform: PlayStation 2
- Release: EU: June 3, 2002; NA: August 22, 2002
- Genre: Light gun shooter
- Mode: Single-player

Endgame is a 2002 light gun shooter game developed by Cunning Developments and published by Empire Interactive, released exclusively for the PlayStation 2 video game console. Built in the RenderWare engine, it features destructible environments and a rudimentary positional audio system. The game was released in the Europe on June 3 and two months later on August 22 in North America. The game's story follows Jade Cornell as she uncovers a plot by the megacorp named EuroDream Technologies who wants to use its own virtual reality technology to control humanity. Cornell is tasked by the Octavian, an Artificial Intelligence, to put a stop to the scheme and save the world.

The game requires Namco's proprietary GunCon controller in order to function properly, it is only compatible with both the first and second generation of the peripheral. Reviews were mixed, who considered the game inferior to its contemparies like Time Crisis and House of the Dead, although the interactive environments received some praise.

== Gameplay ==
The game is a first-person on-rails shooter using Namco's GunCon light gun controller, in the vein of the Time Crisis series. The player interacts by aiming directly the physical light gun on part of the screen where enemies appear. Like the aforementioned series, the game includes a reload and cover system, which allows the player to avoid enemy fire by ducking behind objects. There are twenty different stages with seven bosses. Sixteen levels are set in the real world and four in a virtual environment. Between levels there are cutscenes that play. With every level there is a set time limit and if the player is too reckless in their shooting, the game will spawn more enemies in, resulting in the player entering a special mode called, "Hypermode", in this mode the player receives an increasingly amount of health regeneration. The enemies will use cover and hide behind bulletproof shields and non-combative non-player characters are intermingled with enemies.

Unlike its arcade contemporaries it includes destructible environments and a separate mini-game called Mighty Joe Jupiter, that is divorced from the main campaign and is meant for practice. Additionally, the game offers challenges for the player to complete; it will track the player's high score and offer unlocks. Contrasting to the more realistic levels of the main campaign, these game modes take places on more sci-fi environments like the moon and other planets battling cartoon Martians and other aliens. Upon completion of the main campaign the game unlocks additional difficulty levels, ability to replay levels, three new gun options, a "mirror mode" and an option the play whole game in hypermode. Endgame uses a rudimentary positional audio system, the sound will come from the direction the player shoots at.

== Synopsis ==
Set on a near future Earth in 2020, in the game the player controls Jade Cornell, who ends up uncovering a plot by the EuroDream Corporation who wants to use their latest virtual reality technology, called VirtualWorldTomorrow, to control the minds of the general populace. Besides stopping EuroDream, Cornell is also charged with rescueing her friend Tyler, the person who informed her of the plot and who was kidnapped in the opening scene of the game by a EuroDream security team.

== Development and release ==
Endgame was developed by British game developer Cunning Developments, who were primarily known for their Pro Pinball series of games. The game was published by Empire Interactive, and distributed by Vivendi Universal in North America and in Australia.

== Reception ==
Endgame received "mixed" reviews, with a 57/100 on review aggregator Metacritic and a 61.08% on GameRankings. Ryan Davis of GameSpot called the game "very cut-and-dried light-gun game", that failed to make a strong impression. He only recommends to game to people who are already fan of the genre, describing the gameplay as a "Time Crisis clone" with a paper-thin narrative. Douglass C. Perry of IGN described it as a "stale and uninteresting" game, that lifts almost all of its ideas from Time Crisis, only to create a worse version of it. His only positives were the graphical effects and the numerous breakable objects in the environment.

On the more positive side the reviewer of the Australian website ImpulseGamer, considered a must-own light-gun game for the PlayStation 2. Praising the animations and called the timer feature "a nail-biter". He also noted that the calibrating of the G-Con2 was straightforward, except for the part device should be plugged in the second USB slot to avoid problems.
