= Gunfighter: The Legend of Jesse James =

2001 video game

- Developer: Rebellion Developments
- Publisher: Ubi Soft
- Platform: PlayStation
- Release: NA: November 19, 2001; EU: December 7, 2001
- Genre: Shooter game
- Mode: Single-player

Gunfighter: The Legend of Jesse James is a shooter video game developed by Rebellion Developments and published by Ubi Soft for the PlayStation. The game's plot is set in the American Old West and stars Jesse James, a 19th century American outlaw.

== Gameplay ==
The game takes inspiration from Namco's Time Crisis and is set in the Wild West. The player must defeat all onscreen enemies in an area in order to move to the next area. The player is allowed to hide in order to dodge enemy attacks and reload the revolver. However, the player must defeat all enemies before an onscreen timer expires. Sometimes, the player is rewarded for clearing an area with a time extension.

== Sequel ==
Gunfighter II: Revenge of Jesse James, a sequel to Gunfighter: The Legend of Jesse James, was developed by Rebellion Developments and published by Ubisoft in Europe in 2003.

== Reception ==
Reception

Aggregate score
Aggregator	Score
Metacritic	55/100

Review scores
Publication	Score
GameSpot	4.6/10
GameZone	7/10
Official U.S. PlayStation Magazine	2.5/5

The game received "mixed or average" reviews according to the review aggregation website Metacritic.
