= Death Crimson 2 =

1999 video game

- Developer: Ecole
- Publisher: Ecole
- Platform: Dreamcast
- Release: JP: 25 November 1999
- Genre: Shooter game
- Modes: Single-player, multiplayer

Death Crimson 2 is a 1999 light-gun shooter game for the Dreamcast console from Ecole. The game can be up played up to four players.

== Gameplay ==
Death Crimson 2 is a light-gun shooter where players blast mechanical enemies while navigating a branching Story mode driven by player choices.

The game can be up played up to four players.

== Development ==
Death Crimson 2 is a sequel to Death Crimson, which was released by Ecole Software for the Sega Saturn in 1996.

Development on Death Crimson 2 began in August 1998 in Japan. It was developed with a team of thirteen people consisting of three programmers, five graphic artists, two story editors, one producer and two sound editors.

== Release and reception ==
Reception

Review scores
Publication	Score
Dreamcast Magazine	53%
Dreamzone	51%

Death Crimson 2 was exclusively released in Japan for the Dreamcast on November 25, 1999. The game received a fan translation in 2014. The game was released to arcades in what Time Extension described as an "updated" form as Death Crimson OX. A new English patch of Death Crimson 2 was released February 2024 which included various bonus content such as videos from the first Death Crimson game and quotes from fans that were originally posted on the Ecole website.

Dreamcast Magazine said Death Crimson 2 was "a very poor man's House of the Dead 2 and is lame as a three-legged donkey".

== See also ==
- List of Dreamcast games
- List of light-gun games
