= Resident Evil Gaiden =

2001 video game

- North American box art
- Developer: M4 (Note: With an original plot and advising from Capcom)
- Publishers: JP/NA: Capcom; EU: Virgin Interactive
- Designer: Tim Hull
- Programmers: James Cox; Kieron Wheeler
- Artists: Stefan Barnett; Mark Brown
- Writer: Hiroki Kato
- Composer: Shahid Ahmad
- Series: Resident Evil
- Platform: Game Boy Color
- Release: PAL: December 14, 2001; JP: March 29, 2002; NA: June 4, 2002
- Genre: Action-adventure
- Mode: Single-player

Resident Evil Gaiden (Note: Known in Japan as Biohazard Gaiden (Japanese: バイオハザード外伝, Hepburn: Baiohazādo Gaiden)) is a 2001 action-adventure game developed by M4 for the Game Boy Color. It was published by Capcom in Japan and North America, and by Virgin Interactive in Europe. Receiving generally mixed reviews by critics, the game marks a departure from other entries in the series, insofar as areas are explored with the playable character seen from a top-down perspective and with battles fought in first-person view. The story revolves around a viral outbreak on a passenger ship and has Leon S. Kennedy and Barry Burton return as protagonists. This game is non-canon, as its plot is contradicted by the main series in key parts, and its events are ignored.

== Gameplay ==
When the playable character is attacked by a monster, the game changes from a top-down perspective to a first-person view with a reticle.

The game features three playable characters and consists of exploring areas, collecting items and combating enemies in the process. Unlike previous entries in the series, Resident Evil Gaiden assumes a top-down perspective for the environment portions that, upon approaching an enemy, changes to a first-person combat mode with a reticle constantly moving to the left and right. To attack, the player has to press the action button while the reticle is in range of the enemy.

== Plot ==
The game introduces an underground organization formed to put an end to the global operations of the Umbrella Corporation, the corporate entity responsible for the Raccoon City disaster. Leon S. Kennedy, one of the protagonists of Resident Evil 2, joined the initiative and received orders to investigate the luxurious ocean cruiser, the Starlight, rumored to be carrying a new type of bio-organic weapon (BOW) developed by Umbrella. However, the organization’s headquarters lose contact with Leon soon after he boards the ship; Barry Burton, a supporting character from the original Resident Evil, is sent in to find out Leon’s whereabouts.

After discovering that the crew and the passengers on the ship have turned into zombies, Barry comes across an orphan girl named Lucia, who can sense the presence of Umbrella’s new BOW and also possesses some other mysterious abilities, which makes Barry suspicious of her origins. Lucia is later kidnapped by the BOW, but Barry reunites with Leon; working together, they defeat the BOW and save Lucia. Headquarters inform Barry that the BOW is supposed to have green blood. Soon after, the Starlight is rocked by a powerful explosion which sets part of the ship on fire. The group split up; Leon and Lucia activate the sprinkler system to prevent the fire from reaching the engine room. However, the two overhear Barry communicating with Umbrella to arrange some sort of an exchange. Their suspicions are confirmed upon meeting him again: holding Leon at gunpoint, Barry kidnaps Lucia and boards an Umbrella submarine with her. A second explosion hits the Starlight, and Leon makes his way to the engine room to investigate its source. He finds out that the BOW has destroyed the fuel converter in an attempt to blow up the ship. Leon successfully fights the monster off, but realizes that damage done to the ship is too severe.

Aboard the Umbrella submarine, Barry reveals to the sub’s captain that he only pretended to abduct Lucia to trick Umbrella into evacuating them off the Starlight, having figured out that the company is actually interested in a different BOW – a genetically engineered parasite growing inside of Lucia, expected to brutally emerge from the girl within ten days. Barry forces the surgeons on board to surgically remove the parasite from the Lucia, and the operation is a success. However, despite its incomplete development, the parasite is able to break through the containment glass and attacks the sub’s captain, “draining the life from him” and turning him into a zombie. The parasite escapes, quickly turning the whole crew into zombies, and rapidly matures into a large, monstrous BOW. Barry and Lucia navigate the submarine back to the Starlight and board it in order to rescue Leon, but the BOW manages to board the sinking ship ahead of them. Although they quickly discover what appears to be Leon, the two find out that the BOW is actually a shape-shifter and that it has assumed the form of their partner. They escape and come across another Leon in the engine room, who Barry believes to be the real one. Together, the three go back to the deck, where the BOW pulls Lucia into the sea. Barry rescues her, only for another Lucia to appear right behind them. The real girl grabs a knife and cuts her hand to show her red blood, confirming her identity. The group then defeat the BOW in one last battle and board the Umbrella submarine as the Starlight sinks. Lucia, having lost her mysterious powers following the parasite’s extraction, is offered to live with Barry’s family.

In the game’s last shot before the credits, Leon’s neck is shown bleeding green blood, revealing him to be the BOW in disguise, which Lucia is now unable to sense. The fate of the real Leon is uncertain, but it is possible he died.

== Development ==
Soon after the release of the Capcom game Dino Crisis (1999), its European publisher Virgin Interactive commissioned a small British studio, M4, to develop a proof-of-concept port for the Game Boy Color. Virgin had been publishing Capcom games in Europe for some time, including Resident Evil games, and was hoping to deepen their ties with Capcom by developing original titles. Capcom was impressed with the Dino Crisis demo, and asked M4 to create an original Resident Evil game using the engine. Capcom was intent on creating a successful handheld Resident Evil game; they had previously encountered issues porting their home console games to less powerful handheld systems, namely Resident Evil 2 on the Game.com, and an unfinished Resident Evil port for the Game Boy Color. Capcom abandoned the Resident Evil Game Boy Color port upon green lighting Resident Evil Gaiden.

Resident Evil Gaiden was chiefly developed by M4. The company was composed of former members of Bits Studio. They used a set of development tools they had created previously for streamlining Game Boy Color development. The team received minimal involvement from Capcom, and were left mostly to develop the game independently. Hiroki Kato wrote an original plot for the game and sent it to M4, but did not interact with the development team directly. Shinji Mikami served as a content advisor but remained mostly hands-off, except for recommending the use of a sliding reticle during the first-person combat sequences. The battle scene concept, inspired by the 1987 role-playing video game Dungeon Master, was designed by M4 and the staff believe it was a significant reason why Capcom contracted them to develop the game.

Nintendo's successor to the Game Boy Color, the Game Boy Advance, was released in March 2001. With consumer attention having shifted to the new handheld system, M4 pushed to have development of Resident Evil Gaiden moved over as well and created a prototype showcasing improved graphics. However, Capcom and Virgin decided to keep development on the Game Boy Color, citing the high costs of recreating assets, reprogramming, and the low margins on Game Boy cartridges.

The game was first released in PAL territories on December 14, 2001. It was released in Japan on March 29, 2002, and in North America on June 4, 2002.

== Reception ==
Reception

Aggregate score
Aggregator	Score
GameRankings	56.46%

Review scores
Publication	Score
Computer and Video Games	7.0/10
GamePro	2.5/5
GameSpot	5.0/10
IGN	4.0/10

Resident Evil Gaiden received generally mixed reviews from critics. Mike Major of GamePro remarked that the visual presentation detracts from the intended creepy atmosphere. IGN's Craig Harris criticized the game's impractical save system for a handheld game (the player can save only at limited save points) and was unsatisfied with the puzzles being reduced to collecting keys and items. GameSpot's Frank Provo addressed the same issues in their review, though they applauded the clever storyline for its many twists and turns. Computer and Video Games also criticized the graphics, but found the puzzles to be on par with that of other installments in the series, and commended the battle system. Retro Gamer included it on their list of top ten Game Boy Color games as a "superb actioner with a gripping storyline" and "an underrated classic."
