= Ninja Assault =

2000 video game

- North American arcade flyer
- Developer: Now Production
- Publisher: Namco: EU: Sony Computer Entertainment (PS2)
- Composer: Hiroto Sasaki
- Platforms: Arcade, PlayStation 2
- Release: Arcade: JP: November 9, 2000; NA: November 2000; PlayStation 2: JP: September 9, 2002; PAL: October 4, 2002; NA: November 18, 2002
- Genre: Light-gun shooter
- Modes: Single-player, multiplayer
- Arcade system: Sega NAOMI

Ninja Assault (Note: Japanese: ニンジャアサルト, Hepburn: Ninja Asaruto) is a 2000 light-gun shooter video game developed by Now Production and published by Namco for arcades. It was ported to the PlayStation 2 in 2002.

== Gameplay ==
Ninja Assault was developed by Namco, who also created the Time Crisis series. However, this game has more in common with Lethal Enforcers, Virtua Cop, and The House of the Dead series, whereby the movement is completely "on-rails" (i.e., with no hiding pedal), and the player must shoot away from the screen to reload. Both versions of this game support up to two players in cooperative gameplay.

== Plot ==
The story, according to the opening movie, is as follows:

"Once upon a time in feudal Japan, a brutal war raged. No one foresaw its conclusion, at least not in the manner in which it unfolded. And now...the evil Shogun Kigai has kidnapped Princess Koto in order to sacrifice her for his resurrection ritual. But there is hope.... Two courageous ninjas (Guren and Gunjo) have stepped forward. The battle among humans has ceased. And in its place, a new battle has begun: humans against demons."

== Release ==
Ninja Assault is advertised in in-game email message in Monolith Soft and Namco's Xenosaga Episode I. After finishing the PS2 release of the game, one would unlock a code that could be entered in the contest at Namco's website to win a copy of the game.

== Reception ==
Reception

Aggregate score
Aggregator	Score
Metacritic	60/100

Review scores
Publication	Score
Electronic Gaming Monthly	6.67/10
Eurogamer	5/10
Famitsu	28/40
Game Informer	6.25/10
GamePro	3.5/5
GameSpot	5.6/10
GameZone	6.5/10
IGN	5/10
Official U.S. PlayStation Magazine	2.5/5
X-Play	2/5

In Japan, Game Machine listed Ninja Assault on their December 15, 2000 issue as being the fourth most-successful dedicated arcade game of the month.

The PS2 version received "mixed" reviews according to the review aggregation website Metacritic. In its preview, IGN compared it with The House of the Dead 2. The same website later gave the Japanese version a mixed review over two months before it was released Stateside, along with Electronic Gaming Monthly, GamePro, Official U.S. PlayStation Magazine, and PSM. In Japan, Famitsu gave it a score of 28 out of 40.
