= Resident Evil Survivor =

2000 video game

- North American PlayStation cover art
- Developer: Tose
- Publishers: JP/NA: Capcom; PAL: Eidos Interactive
- Director: Hiroyuki Kai
- Producer: Tatsuya Minami
- Writers: Noboru Sugimura; Naoyuki Sakai
- Composer: Shiro Kohmoto
- Series: Resident Evil
- Platforms: PlayStation, Microsoft Windows
- Release: PlayStation: JP: January 27, 2000; EU: March 31, 2000; NA: August 30, 2000; Windows: CHN: September 7, 2002; TW: September 7, 2002
- Genre: First-person shooter
- Mode: Single-player

Resident Evil Survivor (Note: Known in Japan as Biohazard Gun Survivor (Japanese: バイオハザード ガンサバイバー, Hepburn: Baiohazādo Gan Sabaibā)) is a first-person shooter video game developed by Tose and published by Capcom. It was released on the PlayStation in Japan on January 27, 2000, in Europe on March 31, 2000, and in North America on August 30, 2000. It is a spin-off of the Resident Evil video game series. It is also the first first-person perspective Resident Evil game predating Resident Evil 7: Biohazard by seventeen years. A Microsoft Windows version was released only in China and Taiwan on September 7, 2002.

As the first release of the Gun Survivor series, this game was a major departure from the main Resident Evil series, substituting the third-person perspective of the previous games for a first-person view. The Japanese and European versions of the game were compatible with Namco's GunCon/G-Con 45 light gun, making it one of the first off-rail light gun games, whereas light gun compatibility was removed from the North American release. It was followed by Resident Evil Survivor 2 – Code: Veronica.

== Gameplay ==
The player takes control of an amnesiac protagonist, struggling desperately against overwhelming odds to stay alive and uncover his identity. Survivor's gameplay is a combination of first-person shooter and arcade-style light gun shooter. The player views the environment from the perspective of the character (first-person view) and moves the character through the environment with the controller. At the same time, if the player wishes to attack an enemy or destroy an object, they press a button which allows them to control a crosshair on the screen. This crosshair can be moved to any location within the main character's line of sight. When using a light gun, players move around by shooting off screen to move and the side buttons to turn, and point at the screen to shoot enemies.

The game borrows its enemies from Resident Evil 2, featuring the zombie models from that game, as well as creatures such as Lickers, the Ivy plants, Moth Giants and Tyrants. In addition, Survivor also reintroduces the original Hunters from the first Resident Evil and features two new enemies in the form of the Umbrella Trashsweeper unit – soldiers armed with machine guns – and the Hypnos T-Type, a new Tyrant model that evolves into different forms.

The player's arsenal consists almost entirely of pistols, such as the Glock 17 and the CZ75 with unlimited ammo. As the protagonist progresses through the game, the player receives larger weapons to aid in defending against even more dangerous opposition while they make their way through Umbrella's ruined city and shadowy research labs.

The game features branching paths that allow the player to determine how the story will unfold and whom they will meet along the way.

== Plot ==
The game takes place after the missile explosion that wiped out the contaminated Raccoon City. Not long after this incident, a helicopter crashes on the outskirts of Umbrella Corporation's private township, located on Sheena Island. The pilot escapes the burning wreckage only to find himself fighting a battle against the living dead, with no memory of his identity or his reasons for being there.

During his quest, he comes across a man named Andy Holland, who knows him as Vincent Goldman, the man said to be responsible for the outbreak of T-virus in the island. Due to his amnesia, he assumes this as a fact. Moments after he gets out of the city, "Vincent" comes across Umbrella's facility, where he meets Lott and Lily Klein, two siblings whose parents used to work for Umbrella. They misjudge him because they were made to believe that Umbrella stands for the common good of all people. The two kids run away from him during their encounter, as "Vincent" follows the children outside the facility, through the canal system, and eventually to their house. He finds Lily in the house and learns from her that Lott has gone to a nearby factory alone to find a way off the island.

Upon learning this, "Vincent" tells Lily to stay and take refuge until he comes back with Lott. He finds his way to the place and, after encountering many monsters, successfully infiltrates the Umbrella research facility just in time to save Lott from a Hunter. "Vincent" then learns from Lott that he is actually Ark Thompson, a private detective who was sent to Sheena Island by Leon S. Kennedy, and that Lott knew who Vincent Goldman really was. Due to his knowledge, Vincent later became a vehement enemy of Ark. However, upon this realization, the facility suddenly activates a self-destruct system that will obliterate the island within 10 minutes. Lott tells Ark that within the facility, there is a railway station that runs underground. Ark tells Lott to go ahead to the station first and regroup there.

However, along his way to the station, Ark encounters the real Vincent and the Hypnos T-type Tyrant. Much to his surprise, the Umbrella executive is killed by the new bio-organic weapon, which then turns its attention to Ark, who manages to hold it off long enough to make a getaway. Ark reaches the railway station and sees Lott and Lily, safe and waiting for him. Using the railway station, they are able to arrive at a landing zone, where a helicopter waits. But on their way to safety, the Hypnos Tyrant shows up again, in a more mutated form. Ark manages to hold off the beast before joining the children in the helicopter. Persistent on its pursuit, the Tyrant leaps onto the helicopter, and Ark kills it firing it off the helicopter with one of the helicopter's missiles, and then kills it with a second one. As the sun rises, Ark, Lily, and Lott flee from Sheena Island together safely, just as the island's complex self-destructs.

== Reception ==
Reception

Aggregate score
Aggregator	Score
Metacritic	39/100

Review scores
Publication	Score
AllGame	1.5/5
CNET Gamecenter	4/10
Edge	5/10
Electronic Gaming Monthly	4.17/10 (Note: Three critics of Electronic Gaming Monthly gave the PlayStation version each a score of 3.5/10, 5/10, and 4/10.)
Famitsu	31/40
Game Informer	4/10
GameSpot	4.1/10
IGN	4/10
Next Generation	1/5
Official U.S. PlayStation Magazine	1.5/5

The PlayStation version received "unfavorable" reviews according to the review aggregation website Metacritic. Edge praised the Japanese import's well-rendered 3D environments, but criticized the long loading screens between opening and closing doors. Edge concluded that the Japanese import is best suited to the rental market, describing it as "more of a cash-in than a knockout." Michael "Major Mike" Weigand of GamePro said, "Don't be fooled by this one: Take 'Resident Evil' out of the title, and all you have left (besides the name of a hit TV show) is a below-average corridor shooter. The scariest thing about this game is how awful it is." (Note: GamePro gave the game two 3/5 scores for graphics and control, 3.5/5 for sound, and 2/5 for fun factor.) Eric Bratcher of NextGen said of the game, "The RE universe could definitely inspire a great gun game. But with bad technology, unforgivable control limitations, and an uncanny lack of fun, this non-gun game definitely isn't it."

In a retrospective review for AllGame, Jon Thompson noted the American version's lack of light gun support. He also found the pacing inappropriately slow for a shooter, and the graphics similar to first generation PlayStation games, and considered the inability to look down problematic due to the presence of crawling enemies.

== Sequels ==
The Gun Survivor series was followed by three sequels, which were released for the PlayStation 2 and utilized the G-Con 2 peripheral. Resident Evil Survivor 2 – Code: Veronica was released for the PlayStation 2 in 2002, based on the characters and enemies of Resident Evil – Code: Veronica. Dino Stalker, a spin-off of the Dino Crisis series, was also released in 2002. A fourth game, Resident Evil: Dead Aim, was released in 2003.
