= Vampire Night =

2000 video game

- Arcade flyer
- Developer: Wow Entertainment
- Publisher: Namco: EU: Sony Computer Entertainment (PS2)
- Platforms: Arcade, PlayStation 2
- Release: Arcade: JP/NA: 2000; PlayStation 2: NA: November 13, 2001; JP: December 6, 2001; EU: June 14, 2002
- Genre: Rail shooter
- Modes: Single player, multiplayer
- Arcade system: Namco System 246

Vampire Night (ヴァンパイアナイト, Vanpaia Naito) is a 2000 light-gun shooter video game developed by Wow Entertainment and published by Namco for arcades. It is a collaboration between Sega and Namco. It was later released for PlayStation 2 in November 2001. The game uses the same engine as the House of the Dead series.

== Plot ==
A struggle between light and dark, from three centuries back, is about to ensue. The parties involved are Michel and Albert, the two vampire hunters representing light, and the vampires representing dark.

In the year 2006, vampire hunters Michel and Albert arrive at an unnamed village in France, and rescue a 12-year-old girl named Caroline who witnessed a couple of villagers held hostage by the vampire sarcoma. After rescuing the villagers and Caroline, the vampire hunters proceed into the castle to destroy the remaining forces of dark.

Although the forces of evil reveal that they created Michel and Albert to kill themselves, they became afraid of death and tried to stop them. The Hunters are in fact Dhampyrs (half-vampires), foreshadowed by their glowing eyes. The outcome is a pyrrhic victory for the forces of good; as the forces of evil are stopped, the vampire hunters decide to let the rising sun end their own lives as well.

Six months later, Caroline pays her respects to the vampire hunters at their graves, glad that she is alive, by putting one of their guns in front of one of their graves, stating that "her heart shall remember all.... That day, that moment, and what happened", before her summer hat flies away to the camera to end the game.

== Reception ==
Reception

Aggregate score
| Aggregator | Score |
|---|---|
| Metacritic | 65/100 |

Review scores
| Publication | Score |
|---|---|
| Famitsu | 32/40 |
| GamePro | 3.5/5 |
| GameSpot | 8.1/10 |
| GameZone | 7.9/10 |
| IGN | 7.3/10 |

In Japan, Game Machine listed Vampire Night on their May 15, 2001 issue as being the fourth most-successful dedicated arcade game of the month.

According to review aggregator Metacritic the game received "Mixed or average reviews" based on 18 reviews. On release, Famitsu magazine scored the PlayStation 2 version of the game a 32 out of 40. IGN gave Vampire Night a 7.3, stating that the game was "good", and while it was not quite as "deep or as good" as other light gun games, there was "still a lot of fun" to be had. In their review, Game Zone gave it 7.9 out of 10, saying that they were pleasantly surprised by the detailed plot which was uncommon for light gun games.
