= Death Crimson OX =

2000 video game

- Developer: Ecole Software
- Publishers: Sega: Dreamcast; JP: Ecole Software; NA: Sammy Entertainment PlayStation 2; JP: Ecole Software; EU: Play It
- Producer: Yoshiyuki Manabe
- Designer: Shinya Sawada
- Programmer: Takaaki Umezu
- Artist: Sachiko Akasaka
- Writer: Manako Ihaya
- Composers: Masafumi Ogata; Kaoru Mizuki; Yūki Kisaragi
- Platforms: Arcade, Dreamcast, PlayStation 2
- Release: October 2000: Arcade; JP: October 2000 Dreamcast; JP: 10 May 2001; NA: 8 August 2001 PlayStation 2; JP: 27 November 2003; EU: 10 December 2004
- Genre: Light gun shooter
- Modes: Single-player, multiplayer
- Arcade system: Sega NAOMI

Death Crimson OX (Note: Japanese: デスクリムゾン OX, Hepburn: Desu Kurimuzon Okkusu) is a light gun shooting game developed by Ecole Software. It was released in arcades in 2000 then ported to the Dreamcast console in 2001 (published by Sammy Entertainment), several months after Sega had dropped support for the console. It is the third and final game in the Death Crimson series, and the only one to be released outside Japan. The game was also released as Guncom 2 in Europe and Death Crimson OX+ (デスクリムゾン OX+, Desu Kurimuzon Okkusu+) in Japan on the PlayStation 2.

== Gameplay ==
Gameplay screenshot.

The game can be played with either a standard controller or a light gun.

== Development ==
Death Crimson OX was developed by Ecole Software.

== Reception ==
Reception

Aggregate score
Aggregator	Score
Metacritic	46/100

Review scores
Publication	Score
Famitsu	25/40
Game Informer	4/10
GameSpot	4.2/10
GameSpy	60%
IGN	4.3/10
Next Generation	2/5
Dreamcast Magazine (JP)	6.33/10

The Dreamcast version received "generally unfavourable reviews" according to the review aggregation website Metacritic. GameSpot described it as a second-rate House of the Dead clone. IGN cited a confusing storyline, poor visuals, and new gameplay mechanics which prevent the game from offering any sort of challenge. Game Informer said that it "gives you plenty of targets, but no real reason to keep pulling the trigger." Eric Bratcher of NextGen called it "A typical gun game with typical gun game problems: It's too short, too redundant, and too similar to everything else out there. Only the NRA would lobby for this one." In Japan, Famitsu gave it a score of 25 out of 40.

Also in Japan, Game Machine listed the arcade version in their 1 January 2001 issue as the thirteenth most-popular dedicated arcade game of the year 2000.

== Series ==
The first game in the series, Death Crimson, was released in 1996 for the Sega Saturn. A sequel, Death Crimson 2: Meranito no Saidan, was released in 1999 for the Dreamcast. Both games were exclusive to Japan. Death Crimson 2 received an English fan translation patch in 2024.
