= Resident Evil: Dead Aim =

2003 video game

- North American box art
- Developer: Cavia
- Publisher: Capcom
- Directors: Eiro Shirahama; Takuya Iwasaki
- Producers: Tatsuya Minami; Kouji Nakajima; Hideshi Tatsuno
- Designers: Yōichi Take; Hisao Akaki; Takumi Kudō; Tadayuki Hoshino; Atsushi Kuwahara
- Writers: Noboru Sugimura; Junichi Miyashita; Toyokazu Sakamoto
- Composer: Nobuyoshi Sano
- Series: Resident Evil
- Platform: PlayStation 2
- Release: JP: February 13, 2003; NA: June 17, 2003; PAL: July 11, 2003
- Genre: Light gun shooter
- Mode: Single-player

Resident Evil: Dead Aim (Note: Known in Japan as Gun Survivor 4: Biohazard: Heroes Never Die (Japanese: ガンサバイバー4 バイオハザード ヒーローズ・ネバー・ダイ, Hepburn: Gan Sabaibā Fō Baiohazādo Hīrōzu Nebā Dai)) is a 2003 light gun shooter video game developed by Cavia and published by Capcom for the PlayStation 2. It is the third Gun Survivor title in the Resident Evil series, and the fourth and final installment in the Gun Survivor series. It is also the third in the franchise to feature first-person shooting in the Resident Evil series.

== Gameplay ==
First-person view

Dead Aim uses a third-person view when moving and switches to a first-person view when aiming and firing a weapon, with a dot in the center of the screen to help the player aim. It is one of the few Resident Evil games that allows the player to move while aiming and supports using the PlayStation 2 light gun and USB mouse.

== Plot ==
In 2002, 4 years after the destruction of Raccoon City, (Note: As depicted in Resident Evil 2 and Resident Evil 3: Nemesis) the Umbrella-owned ocean liner, Spencer Rain, has been infested by the t-Virus stolen from Umbrella's Paris lab by bioterrorist and former Umbrella employee Morpheus D. Duvall, and its secret Bio-Organic Weapon (BOW) cargo intentionally released. Morpheus threatens to launch missiles loaded with the t-Virus from an undisclosed silo, unless the U.S. and China agree to his $5 billion ransom. Bruce McGivern, a member of USSTRATCOM's "Anti-Umbrella Pursuit Investigation Team", a U.S. government task force with the sole purpose of taking down Umbrella, is sent in. Alongside him is Fong Ling, sent by the Chinese MSS. Although they share the same goals and common enemy, their respective governments are against working together.

During Bruce's investigation, he is found by Morpheus and held at gunpoint on the foredeck. A surprise attack by Fong Ling with a grenade allows Bruce to escape into the ship, with Morpheus being injured in the explosion. Morpheus later infects himself with the experimental "t+G virus" in order to avoid an otherwise-fatal wound. The "t+G" virus alters Morpheus' body, with it outwardly developing more feminine attributes, with breasts and permanent high heels. After a brief encounter with the mutated Morpheus in the cargo hold, Bruce escapes, after being unable to harm Morpheus, into engineering with the aid of Fong Ling. Restoring power to parts of the ship and discovering important items, the two gain access to the bridge - with Bruce killing the infected captain in the search - to find that the Spencer Rain is on a collision course with a nearby island. Running outside to escape the ship, Bruce is forced to fight Tyrant 091, which had escaped containment before Bruce's encounter with Morpheus. Once it is defeated, Bruce jumps into the ocean and swims to the shore as the liner is destroyed.

Briefly exploring the island, which is shown to contain an abandoned Umbrella facility, Bruce moves down into its waterways in search of Morpheus. Making his way through a series of underwater channels, he discovers that the island was used as a waste disposal facility for failed BOWs until it was recently lost in a biohazardous outbreak. Deeper in the facility, Fong Ling has escaped from "Pluto", a failed experiment that Umbrella lost track of, later rejoining with Morpheus. It is at this point that they discover that the Chinese have given into Morpheus' demands and agreed to pay up, arranging for an orbital weapons satellite to kill Fong Ling with a targeted laser device to maintain total secrecy. Bruce correctly deduces that the satellite is tracking a chip in her tattoo, and proceeds to dig it out with a knife. With the chip destroyed, the satellite ceases its attack. The two make their way to a storage facility to travel to the underwater Bio-Sphere where the missile silo is a part of, but Bruce is forced to fight Pluto before he can reach it.

With Pluto defeated, the two make their way down the elevator; Morpheus makes a sudden reappearance, sending the elevator crashing to the seafloor. The two operatives survive the crash and explore the facility, finding that Morpheus' own bioterrorist organization has already been compromised by another t-Virus outbreak. Fong Ling is captured by Morpheus, who uses her to play a game with Bruce - try to save her, or abandon her to complete the mission. Bruce chooses to save her, allowing Fong Ling to provide logistical support as he searches for the missiles. However, a greatly mutated Morpheus attempts to stop Bruce from reaching the missiles in time, though further damage causes the G-mutant to expand in size. Bruce successfully defeats Morpheus, causing the mutated BOW to continually expand in size until the underwater facility self-destructs. With the missiles prevented from being launched, Morpheus disposed of, and any trace of the facility destroyed, Bruce and Fong Ling make their way to the surface using a life boat to escape. The life boat launches a flare into the sky revealing the location of the agents to their superiors/rescue services. Bruce asks Fong Ling to come with him to America. She declines, saying she belongs to her own nation. Bruce makes a witty remark in her language and the two agents embrace as a helicopter arrives to escort them to safety.

== Development ==
Dead Aim was announced in 2002 as a PlayStation 2 game expected to be released in Japan sometime in 2003. Like Gun Survivor 2, it was not expected to be released into the United States at the time. The game features the ending theme song "Gun Shot" by Japanese rock band Rize.

Capcom's January 15, 2003, press release demonstrated a working build of the game, revealing that, unlike the previous three Gun Survivor titles, Gun Survivor 4 (planned to be known as Resident Evil: Dead Aim to the now-confirmed U.S. and European markets) would interchange between first- and third-person camera angles depending on whether or not the player is aiming a weapon. The GunCon 2 light-gun controller was also confirmed to be compatible with the game. The conference expected a June 2003 release date.

Despite its June release, Dead Aim still made an appearance at E3 2003 just a month prior alongside the GameCube release of Resident Evil – Code: Veronica X and Resident Evil Outbreak.

The 2005 crossover game Namco × Capcom featured Bruce and Ling as playable characters.

== Reception ==
Reception

Aggregate scores
| Aggregator | Score |
|---|---|
| GameRankings | 66.74% (47 reviews) |
| Metacritic | 65/100 (28 reviews) |

Review scores
| Publication | Score |
|---|---|
| 1Up.com | C |
| Computer and Video Games | 6/10 |
| Eurogamer | 7/10 |
| Game Informer | 6/10 |
| GameSpot | 6.4/10 |
| IGN | 6.9/10 |

Dead Aim received a mixed critical reception. GameSpot gave it a 6.4 saying, "It's not the best Resident Evil game, and it isn't a stellar light-gun game, but Dead Aim creates an interesting, unique hybrid of the two, and that is a commendable feat." IGN gave it a 6.9, praising it as the best in the Gun Survivor series and featuring stellar graphics, but criticized it for its cheesy dialogue and unoriginal premise. X-Play gave the game a 4/5, citing the improved graphics and controls from previous attempts.
