= Resident Evil Survivor 2 – Code: Veronica =

2002 video game

- European PlayStation 2 box art
- Developers: Namco, Nextech, SIMS Co., Ltd.
- Publisher: Capcom: JP: Namco
- Composer: Hiroshi Igarashi
- Series: Resident Evil
- Platforms: Arcade, PlayStation 2
- Release: PlayStation 2: JP: November 8, 2001; EU: February 8, 2002; Arcade: JP: July 2001
- Genre: Light gun shooter
- Mode: Single-player
- Arcade system: Sega NAOMI

Resident Evil Survivor 2 – Code: Veronica (Note: Known in Japan as Gun Survivor 2 – Biohazard – Code: Veronica (Japanese: ガンサバイバー2 バイオハザード コード：ベロニカ, Hepburn: Gan Sabaibā Tsū Baiohazādo Kōdo: Beronika)) is a light gun shooter video game developed by Namco and published by Capcom as part of the Resident Evil series. The arcade version was developed in conjunction with Namco for the arcade machines. The game was released for Sega NAOMI and PlayStation 2. It was released on the PlayStation 2 on November 7, 2001, in Japan and in Europe on March 22, 2002. Whilst the PlayStation 2 release is a light gun shooter, the NAOMI arcade release features no lightgun technology whatsoever, instead deferring control of each player entirely to a three-axis joystick in the shape of a gun. The game is the second installment in the Gun Survivor series and the sequel to Resident Evil Survivor. The game is adapted from Resident Evil – Code: Veronica and features enemies and characters from that game, and enemies from Resident Evil 2 and 3. It was followed by Dino Stalker which is a spin-off of Dino Crisis, and has no ties to Resident Evil.

== Plot ==
Claire Redfield is continuing to look for her brother after the Raccoon City incident and she was tipped by an unknown source about an Umbrella facility in Paris. When she tried to infiltrate the facility, she was caught, after which she was taken to the Umbrella prison in Rockfort Island. She teams up with fellow prisoner, Steve Burnside, and plans to escape while an outbreak of the T-virus is released onto the island. This game's events are actually revealed to be a dream after the completion of the arcade mode, which Claire is having after escaping Antarctica with her brother Chris Redfield at the end of Code: Veronica. Throughout the game, Claire and Steve are being pursued by Nemesis. The secret files which can be unlocked after collecting the hidden gems in arcade mode reveal that Umbrella sent a replica of Nemesis to Rockfort Island.

== Gameplay ==
In the game, players assume control of either Claire Redfield or Steve Burnside in two distinct gameplay modes: dungeon and arcade. Both modes offer light-gun support, including the GunCon 2 from Namco, although the game can be played using the standard Dual Shock 2 controller as well.

In arcade mode, the aim is simply to escape from Rockfort Island. The route is split into several stages, with completion of each sector dependent on finding a key and defeating the boss character lurking in the area. In addition to the bosses, players must face an assortment of enemies. The arcade mode also offers assistance via the partner system. This allows players to team up with a computer-controlled character to provide cover. If players choose to play as Claire, for example, their partner will be Steve. The game runs on a timer that counts down when an area is entered, and if time runs out, the Nemesis from Resident Evil 3: Nemesis will start pursuing the player and will quickly kill the characters if they don't hurry to an exit.

Without the assistance of a partner, the dungeon mode pits players against successive waves of enemies, comparable to a survival mode. Completion of a mission is once again determined by defeating a boss, but the more zombies and mutants defeated, the greater the overall mission score. Time is also crucial in this mode, because each time an enemy is defeated, a combo gauge appears and the player must defeat another enemy before the gauge runs out to receive an additional combo score. If players are quick enough and accurate enough, then the combo will keep multiplying, resulting in bigger scores. In this mode, the player's character can select three weapons to take on the quest. Some weapons can be used by both Claire and Steve, while others such as the magnum and the grenade launcher are restricted to an individual character.

== Development ==
The game was announced as Biohazard: Fire Zone by Capcom in February 2002 as part of a deal with Namco in developing an Arcade game tie-in to the Resident Evil series. Back in 1998, Capcom had toyed with the notion of developing an arcade game after the proper-establishment of the franchise; this was either the precursor to Fire Zone or an unrelated project "deep in development" for the Sega Naomi that was merged with the then-Dreamcast-exclusive Resident Evil - Code: Veronica (the Naomi and Dreamcast were designed with the same hardware components).

Still in beta-testing, it was scheduled to appear at the AOU Amusement Expo later in February, 2002. From available footage, it was noticeable at the time that there was no voice acting in the game's cutscenes; instead, all conversations between Steve Burnside and Claire Redfield were subtitled. Capcom had already confirmed that they had no plans on releasing the Arcade machine into the North American market. Just two months later, the game was officially renamed Gun Survivor 2 Biohazard Code: Veronica.

== Reception ==
In Japan, Game Machine listed Resident Evil Survivor 2 – Code: Veronica on their August 14, 2002 issue as being the most-successful dedicated arcade game of the month.
