= Razing Storm =

2009 video game

- North American arcade flyer
- Developer: Namco Bandai Games
- Publisher: Namco Bandai Games: EU: Sony Computer Entertainment (PS3)
- Series: Time Crisis
- Engine: Havok
- Platforms: Arcade, PlayStation 3
- Release: WW: Summer 2009; PlayStation 3: NA: October 19, 2010; JP: October 21, 2010; EU: November 5, 2010
- Genre: Rail shooter
- Modes: Single-player, multiplayer
- Arcade system: Namco System 357

Razing Storm is a 2009 light-gun shooter video game developed and published by Namco Bandai Games for the System 357 arcade board. It is the second spin-off of the Time Crisis series published by Namco after Crisis Zone.

Razing Storm was released for the PlayStation 3 as Time Crisis: Razing Storm in North America, and as Big 3 Gun Shooting in Japan in October 2010, and features support for the PlayStation Move controller and Namco Guncon 3 controller.

== Plot ==
Razing Storm's story takes place in the year 2030, with the players — referred to as Alpha One and Alpha Two in-game — in a massively destructible environment to fight futuristic terrorists and renegade soldiers. Located in South America, which is under a bloody revolution. The player is sent as part of a special forces unit called S.C.A.R. (Strategic Combat and Rescue), sent to capture the leader of the rebels, Paulo Guerra, who masterminded an attack on the United States. Guerra's schemes are shrouded in mystery, as much of his doings are unraveled in the PlayStation 3 version of the game, which also wraps up the cliffhanger from the Arcade release.

== Gameplay ==
Razing Storm is similar to many of its Time Crisis rail shooter counterparts, namely Crisis Zone, using the signature foot pedal cover system, but providing the player with a machine gun as the default weapon and a handheld ballistic shield. Pressing down on the pedal allows the player to lower the shield and attack, but leaves them open to enemy fire. Releasing the pedal allows the player to raise the shield, reloading their weapon and rendering the player impervious to all conventional types of damage, but leaves them unable to attack. The game also has a time limit on each section. This forces the player to attack and take risks rather than spend too much time hiding behind their shield, or they will face damage from events that occur when from the timer runs out.

Players have a limited number of life marks (a default setting of three) and one mark is taken away for every hit of damage they take and whenever the timer runs out. A one-half mark is taken away for accidentally shooting a civilian in certain situations, but several one-half marks can be earned (even above the default amount) by covering allied squad members in other situations. When the life marks drop to zero or below, the game is over. Different from most Time Crisis games, clear warnings are given when an enemy has locked-on and is about to attack, usually in the form of a shrinking crosshair mark around an enemy's gun, or a yellow triangle around flying projectiles. As the player keeps progressing without taking damage, the warning time shrinks and projectiles travel faster, forcing the player to defend much more quickly and efficiently to avoid damage while moving forward, much like the Virtua Cop series.

Unlike its Time Crisis counterparts, Razing Storm puts a unique emphasis on the player's score and performance, with frequent checkpoints, score reports, and commentary for hit chains to let the player know how he's doing, and how he compares to other players before him. As the player scores continuous hits on enemies in short periods of time, his hit counter increases, giving score bonuses and compliments from other characters at certain milestones (scoring a 50, 100, 150 hit chain, etc.). The hit counter/chain is also added to and extended by destroying the surrounding environment, such as shooting out windows, railings, fruit stands, and concrete barriers. Large score bonuses are also given for quick completion of areas, as a time bonus, and for destroying environmental hazards that harm enemies. This scoring system gives players incentive to attack and shoot continuously and recklessly, taking risks for a high score, rather than playing defensively to simply complete the game.

Razing Storm has 4 stages of gameplay, in which playing all four stages is contingent on how well the player performed. Players must encounter militias, rogue troopers, and mechanized enemies throughout. Players are also given four different weapons, based on the situation that the player is facing.

Originally an arcade game, Razing Storm was released as a part of Time Crisis: Razing Storm for the PlayStation 3. In the PlayStation 3 port, a first-person shooting Story Mode (similar to Time Crisis 4's Full Mission) covers cliffhangers and plot holes purposely omitted from the arcade version.

== See also ==
- Time Crisis: Razing Storm
