= Rintarō Nishi =

Japanese voice actor

- 西 凜太朗
- Born: Kazuaki Kurita (栗田 和晃, Kurita Kazuaki); July 15, 1965 (age 61); Osaka, Japan
- Occupations: Actor, voice actor
- Years active: 1991–present
- Agent: Office Osawa
- Spouse: Yūko Nitō
- Children: 1

Rintarō Nishi (西 凜太朗, Nishi Rintarō; born July 15, 1965, in Osaka) is a Japanese actor and voice actor affiliated with Office Osawa. His real name is Kazuaki Kurita (栗田 和晃, Kurita Kazuaki).

== Filmography ==
=== Television animation ===
1990s

- Ganba! Fly High (1996) – Zenkō Kaizuka
- Cowboy Bebop (1998) – Asimov Solenson

2000s

- Initial D: Fourth Stage (2004) – Shūichi Matsumoto
- Samurai Champloo (2004) – Hanjirō
- Bleach (2005) – Tetsuzaemon Iba
- Beet the Vandel Buster (2005) – Baus
- School Rumble: 2nd Semester (2006) – Mr. Suō
- Death Note (2007) – Eiichi Takahashi
- Ghost Hound (2007) – Seiichi Suzuki
- Moribito: Guardian of the Spirit (2007) – Jiguro
- Soul Eater (2008) – Free
- One Piece (2009) – Heracles

2010s

- House of Five Leaves (2010) – Jin
- Fullmetal Alchemist: Brotherhood (2010) – Charlie
- Rainbow: Nisha Rokubō no Shichinin (2010) – Aoki
- X-Men (2011) – Jake
- The Knight in the Area (2012) – Masakatsu Kondo
- Space Brothers (2012) – Freddie Saturn
- Attack on Titan (2013) – Moblit Berner
- Ace of Diamond (2014) – Raizō Todoroki
- Akame ga Kill! (2014) – Gozuki
- Kill la Kill (2014) – Taro Genbu
- Tokyo Ghoul (2014) – Jason/Yamori
- The Seven Deadly Sins (2014) – Bartra Liones, Narrator
- Mob Psycho 100 (2016) – Fuji

2020s

- ID - Invaded (2020) – Matsuoka
- Saiyuki Reload: Zeroin (2022) - Varaharu
- The Witch and the Beast (2024) – Magic Sword Ashgan
- Let's Go Karaoke! (2025) – Shaved Head

=== Original video animation (OVA) ===
- Legend of the Galactic Heroes (1998) – Karl von der Decken
- Demon Prince Enma (2006) – Manager
- Mobile Suit Gundam Unicorn (2010) – Saboa

=== Theatrical animation ===
- Vampire Hunter D: Bloodlust (2000) – Machira
- Nasu: Summer in Andalusia (2003) – Pizzaro
- Mind Game (2004) – Yakuza
- Bleach: Memories of Nobody (2006) – Tetsuzaemon Iba
- Bleach: Fade to Black (2008) – Tetsuzaemon Iba
- Bootleg (2009) – healthy
- Doraemon: Nobita and the Island of Miracles—Animal Adventure (2012) – Arco

=== Video games ===
- Star Wars: Republic Commando (2005) (Japanese dub) – "Boss"
- Razing Storm (2010) (Japanese dub) – Uncredited
- Yakuza 5 (2012) – Masaru Watase
- Killer Is Dead (2013) – Damon
- Ryū ga Gotoku Ishin! (2014) – Sasaki Tadasaburō
- Soul Sacrifice (2014) – Mordred
- The Seven Deadly Sins: Grand Cross (2019) – Captain Denzel
- Yakuza: Like a Dragon (2020) – Masaru Watase
- Like a Dragon Gaiden: The Man Who Erased His Name (2023) - Masaru Watase

=== Television dramas ===
- Mito Kōmon (2011) – Shuzen Watanabe

=== Tokusatsu ===
- Gosei Sentai Dairanger (1993) – Lieutenant Colonel Shadam (eps. 1 – 10, 12 – 14, 17 – 22, 26 – 31, 37, 38 & 42 – 50)/Gorma XVI (Actor) (49 & 50)
- Kamen Rider Den-O (2007) – Crow Imagin (eps. 7 & 8)
- Samurai Sentai Shinkenger (2009) – Doukoku Chimatsuri (eps. 1 – 9, 11 – 16, 18 – 20, 23 – 31, 33 – 40 & 45 – 49)
- Samurai Sentai Shinkenger The Movie: The Fateful War (2009) – Doukoku Chimatsuri
- Samurai Sentai Shinkenger vs. Go-onger: GinmakuBang!! (2010) – Doukoku Chimatsuri
- Samurai Sentai Shinkenger Returns (2010) – Drunk drinker (Actor)
- Tokumei Sentai Go-Busters (2012) – Burnerloid (ep. 2)

=== Stage ===
- Julius Caesar (1990)
- The Cherry Orchard (1993)

=== Dubbing ===
==== Live-action ====
- 10,000 BC (2011 TV Asahi edition) – Lu'Kibu (Joel Fry)
- Bionic Woman – Antonio Pope (Isaiah Washington)
- Boss Level – Roy Pulver (Frank Grillo)
- Bullet to the Head – Robert Nkomo Morel (Adewale Akinnuoye-Agbaje)
- Edge of Tomorrow – Skinner (Jonas Armstrong)
- El Cantante – Willie Colón (John Ortiz)
- ER – Mobalage Ikabo (Djimon Hounsou)
- The Expendables 3 – Hale Caesar (Terry Crews)
- The Fall Guy – Dressler (Ben Knight)
- The Fast and the Furious (2005 TV Asahi edition) – Vince (Matt Schulze)
- The Fatal Encounter – Gap-soo / Sang-chaek (Jung Jae-young)
- Final Destination (2002 TV Asahi edition) – William Bludworth (Tony Todd)
- Final Destination 2 (2006 TV Tokyo edition) – William Bludworth (Tony Todd)
- The Final Girls – Duncan (Thomas Middleditch)
- Flight of Fury – Rojar (Alki David)
- The Fourth Kind – Tommy Fisher (Corey Johnson)
- Furiosa: A Mad Max Saga – Rictus Erectus (Nathan Jones)
- Ghost (1999 TV Asahi edition) – Willie Lopez (Rick Aviles)
- Glitter – Rafael (Eric Benét)
- Gridiron Gang – Malcolm Moore (Xzibit)
- The Huntsman: Winter's War – Liefr (Sam Hazeldine)
- The Karate Kid – John Kreese (Martin Kove)
- The Karate Kid Part III – John Kreese (Martin Kove)
- The Last Stand – Lewis Dinkum (Johnny Knoxville)
- Live and Let Die (2006 Blu-ray edition) – Baron Samedi (Geoffrey Holder)
- Meg 2: The Trench – Montes (Sergio Peris-Mencheta)
- Mortdecai – Jock Strapp (Paul Bettany)
- Oblivion – Sykes (Nikolaj Coster-Waldau)
- Pacific Rim: Uprising – Sonny (Nick E. Tarabay)
- Pilgrimage – Frère Geraldus (Stanley Weber)
- Punisher: War Zone – Paul Budiansky (Colin Salmon)
- Rambo: Last Blood (2022 BS Tokyo edition) – Victor Martinez (Óscar Jaenada)
- Red Planet – Robby Gallagher (Val Kilmer)
- Safe House – Michael Collarsdale (Peter Ferdinando)
- Snitch – Daniel James (Jon Bernthal)
- Snow White and the Huntsman – King Magnus (Noah Huntley)
- The Three Musketeers – Captain Rochefort (Mads Mikkelsen)
- The Transporter – Darren "Wall Street" Bettencourt (Matt Schulze)
- Waitress – Earl Hunterson (Jeremy Sisto)
- The Way Back – Valka (Colin Farrell)
- XXX – Xander Cage (Vin Diesel)
- XXX: Return of Xander Cage – Xander Cage (Vin Diesel)
- Yakuza Princess – Shiro (Jonathan Rhys Meyers)

==== Animation ====
- Ben 10 – Clancy
- The Powerpuff Girls – Big Billy
- Queer Duck: The Movie – Oscar Wildcat
- Spider-Man: The Animated Series – Blade
- Star vs. the Forces of Evil – Buff Frog
- Tron: Uprising – General Tesler
