= Time Crisis =

Video game series

- The logo utilized in the original Time Crisis
- Genres: Light gun shooter Rail shooter First-person shooter
- Developers: Namco; Nex Entertainment
- Publishers: Namco; Bandai Namco Entertainment
- Platforms: Arcade, PlayStation, PlayStation 2, PlayStation 3, iOS
- First release: Time Crisis; December 1995
- Latest release: Time Crisis 5: True Mastermind; August 2015

Time Crisis is a first-person on-rails light gun shooter series of arcade video games by Namco, introduced in 1995. It is focused on the exploits of a fictional international intelligence agency who assigns its best agents to deal with a major threat by a hostile organisation, which has ranged from criminals, terrorists and hostile military outfits, and mostly take place within fictional locations across the world. The arcade series differed from other light gun shooters of its time by incorporating unique mechanics, including the ability to duck into cover to dodge attacks and reload the player's weapon, and forcing players to complete battles in each level within an allotted amount of time.

Over time, the series developed to incorporate additional features of gameplay, including two-player co-operative modes on arcade machines, the ability to use additional weapons in combat, and dealing with dangerous events. Alongside arcade machines, the series was also developed for consoles, beginning with a port of the first installment to PlayStation consoles in 1995, with all ported versions of arcade titles featuring additional content and game mechanics, such as additional stages, and different difficulty modes.

Alongside the main games in the series, it also has spawned a number of spin-off titles that incorporate the cover mechanics and time limit gameplay elements, but with notable differences in combat situations and organisations involved in each game's story and levels.

== Overview ==
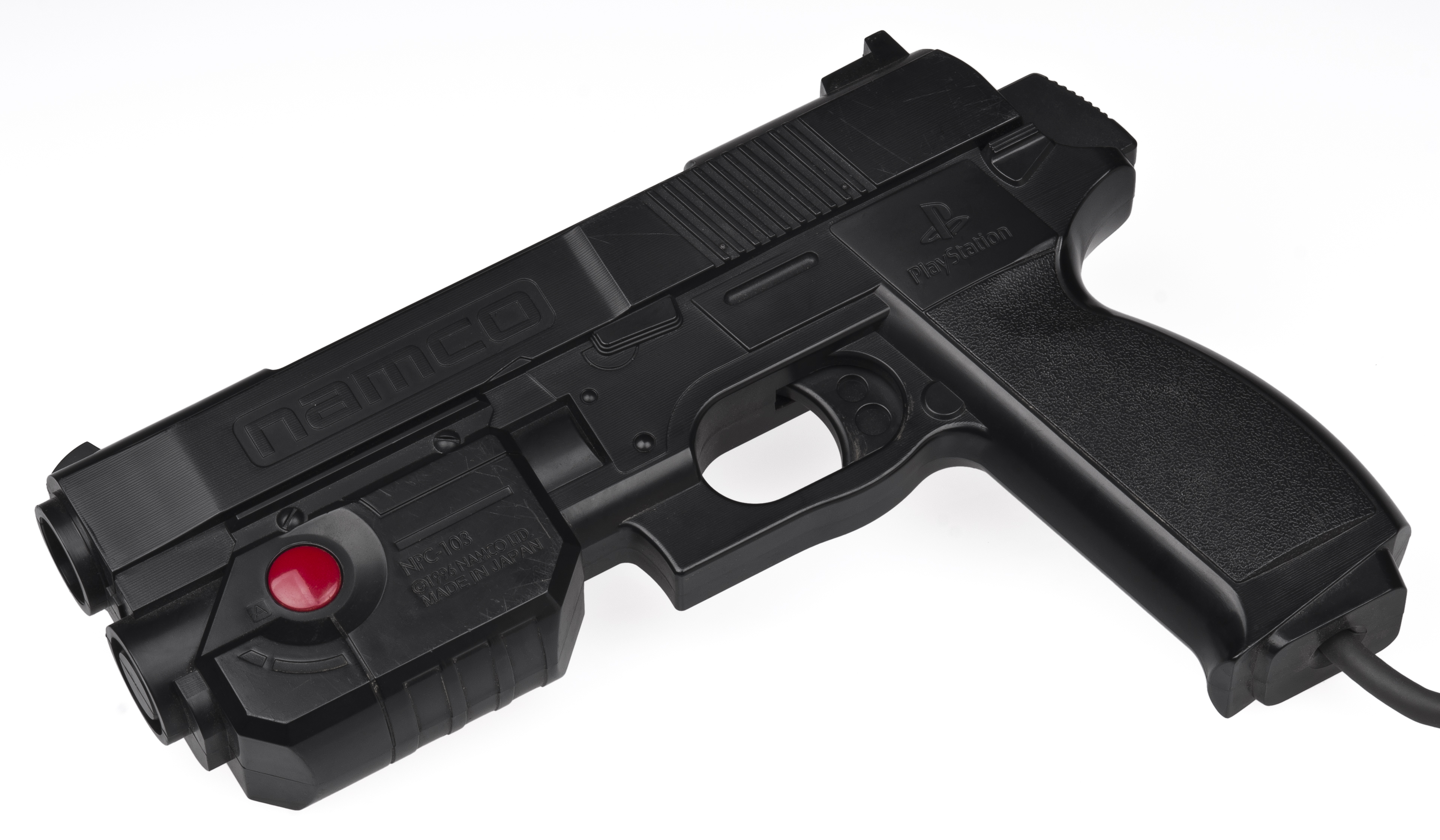
GunCons were bundled with the console versions of Time Crisis. This is a GunCon for the original PlayStation.

The setting of each Time Crisis revolves around a serious threat to usually one nation. However, some games have involved a threat to the world (Time Crisis II), the protagonist/player (Time Crisis: Project Titan), or to the protagonists'/players' organization (Time Crisis 5). The V.S.S.E. (Vital Situation, Swift-Elimination), a covert organization, must send in its highly skilled agents to eliminate any possible security threats. The first Time Crisis had three stages with four areas (location where the game starts) each. The second and third installments have three stages, each with three areas. The fourth installment adds a prologue for a total of 4 stages each with three areas (with the exception of the prologue, which has only one area). The fifth installment has an exclusive upgrade kit True Mastermind edition, which also includes the full version of the game. This doubles the stages from 3 to 6, with 3 areas that are interconnected with each other, thus there would be no breaks/loadings after clearing an area (with the exception of the final stage, which only has one area).

Many of the fighting areas are dangerous situations, such as a steadily capsizing ship or a train dangling off a damaged bridge (as in Time Crisis 3). In the third and fourth installments, supporters from various organizations come in to assist the V.S.S.E. agents, sometimes to aid them in their mission, sometimes to protect their own reputations. Crisis Zone has a different plot, which is focused on a SWAT team rather than secret agents. It takes place in the United Kingdom and concerns the S.T.F. (or Special Tactical Force)'s attempt to destroy the U.R.D.A., a terrorist organization. Razing Storm and Time Crisis: Razing Storm, which take place in the near-future, involve an elite task force known as S.C.A.R. (Strategic Combat and Rescue) being sent to a South American country during a revolution to capture and defeat the mastermind who has orchestrated an attack on the United States together with several international military organizations, while battling terrorists and other renegade soldiers and other combatants.

== Games ==
Release timeline Main releases in bold
| 1995 | **Time Crisis** |
1996
| 1997 | **Time Crisis II** |
1998
| 1999 | Crisis Zone |
2000
| 2001 | Time Crisis: Project Titan |
| 2002 | **Time Crisis 3** |
2003
2004
2005
| 2006 | **Time Crisis 4** |
2007
2008
| 2009 | Razing Storm |
| 2009 | Time Crisis Strike |
| 2010 | Time Crisis 2nd Strike |
2011
2012
2013
2014
| 2015 | **Time Crisis 5** |

=== Main series ===
==== Time Crisis (1995) ====
The first installment, Time Crisis, was released for arcades in 1995. Its story focuses on Richard Miller, an agent of an international intelligence agency, as he races against time to rescue the daughter of a newly installed president, from a member of the previous regime seeking to reclaim control of their former country. The game introduced several of the gameplay elements that would form the foundation of the series, including combat sections that had to be completed within a strict time-limit and the cover mechanics, and well as introducing the recurring character Wild Dog, who would feature prominently as a boss character in the main series.

A port of the game for the PlayStation was released in 1997, supported by the newly launched GunCon light gun peripheral, and included an add-on of new stages set after the events of the main story. These events focus on Miller being assigned to investigate a criminal organisation, operating out of hotel that is a front for a munitions factory, and dealing against with its mysterious leader as well.

==== Time Crisis II (1997) ====
Time Crisis II, released for the arcades in 1997, focuses on the efforts of intelligence agents Keith Martin and Robert Baxter, as they attempt to thwart the efforts of a major industrial tycoon from launching a nuclear military satellite in space, and rescue a fellow agent that they kidnapped. The game offered co-operative gameplay between two players for the first time, with the arcade original being launched with linked game machines that featured contrasting coloured light gun controllers. In addition, the original game mechanics of its predecessor were modified for the sequel, including the time-limit system to be more forgiving, while incorporating new elements such as each playable character having their own battle situations at times, players receiving a score penalty for shooting the other character, and a new game highlight system for indicating a deadly shot about to hit the player. A port of the game for the PlayStation 2 was released in 2001, supported by the GunCon 2 light gun peripheral, which included enhanced graphics and additional story scenes.

==== Time Crisis 3 (2003) ====
Time Crisis 3, released for the arcades in 2003, focuses on the efforts of agents Alan Dunaway and Wesley Lambert being sent to help thwart the efforts of a hostile nation, who recently took control of a neighbouring country's island, as part of a plan to strike at several countries in its vicinity with tactical missiles. As part of their mission, the pair work alongside Alicia Winston, a local resistance fighter, who seeks to rescue her brother and her men, after they are captured following a failed attempt to destroy the missiles themselves.

The game expanded on the series' gameplay mechanics by allowing players to use three additional weapons in each level, alongside the traditional handgun of the playable characters, though unlike the main weapon, each has limited ammo that can only be replenished by defeating a special type of enemy during combat sections. In addition, a health bar element was included for bosses and certain enemies that must be depleted in order to defeat them, and destructible objects that can take out enemies close to them when they explode. The ported version for the PlayStation 2, released in the same year, featured additional content including a side mission mode, which is focused on Alicia's perspective of events in the story. While it featured similar gameplay, it also included the addition of stages in which players take out enemies while using a sniper rifle.

==== Time Crisis 4 (2006) ====
In 2006, Time Crisis 4 was released and introduced a refined multi-hiding system (similar to the one featured in Time Crisis: Project Titan) where the player can move the gun in a certain direction to move the character's position in certain areas of the game regardless whether or not the player may hiding or attacking the enemy. A PlayStation 3 version was released in 2007 in the United States and Japan, and in 2008 in Europe and Australia, bundled with the GunCon 3 light gun peripheral. It was notable for introducing a first-person shooter mode to the series.

==== Time Crisis 5 (2015) ====
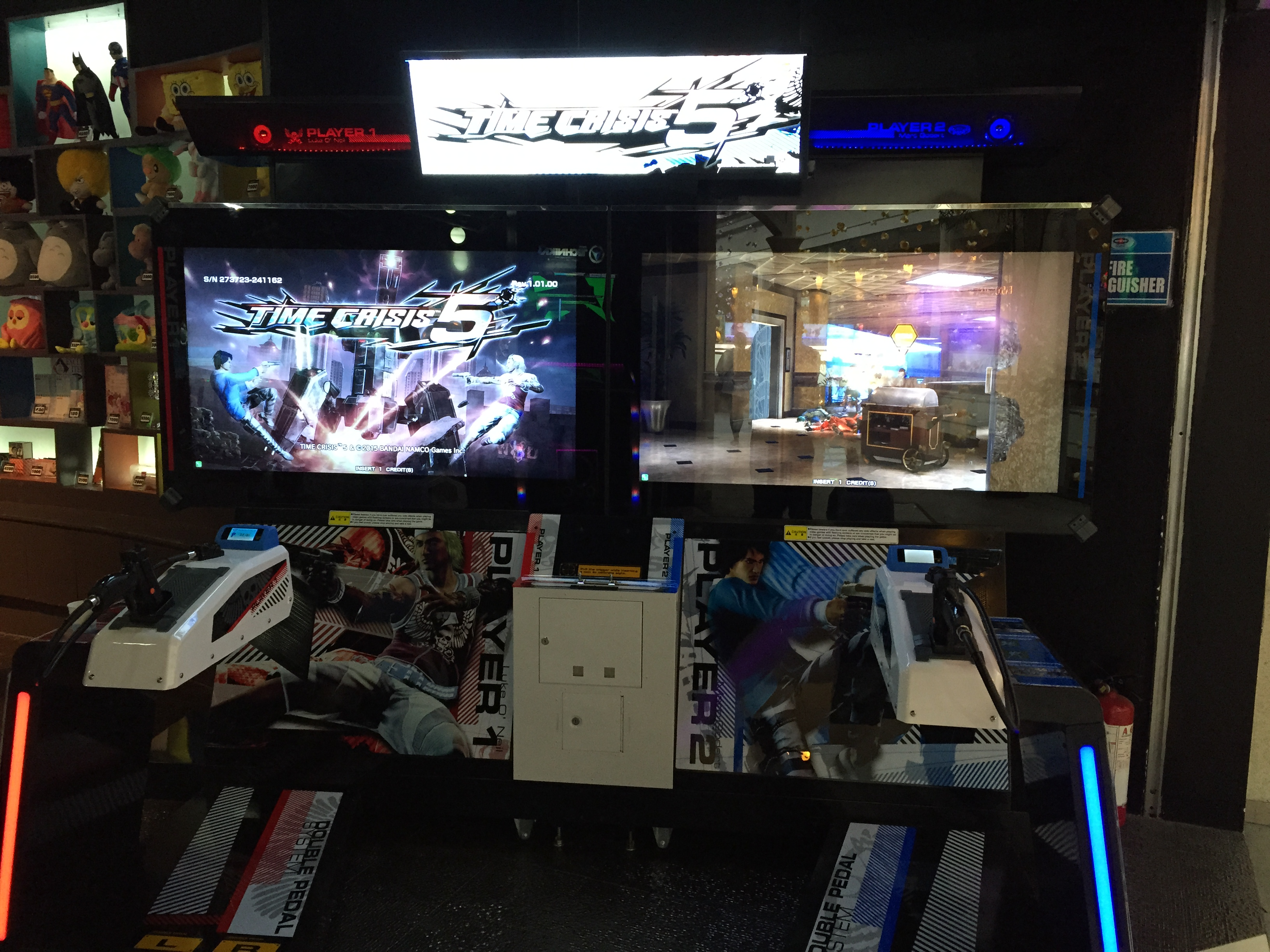
A Time Crisis 5 arcade cabinet at a Time Zone branch in the Philippines

Time Crisis 5 was released by Namco in March 2015 in the arcades. It is the first entry in the Time Crisis series to use Epic Games' Unreal Engine 3. Unlike its predecessors, the game uses two pedals. Namco later showed a True Mastermind edition of the game which was released near the end of August the same year, and includes the second half of the game, consisting of three new stages, for a total of six stages, the largest in the series. It is currently the only main entry in the series not yet released for any home console.

=== Other games ===
==== Crisis Zone (1999) ====
Crisis Zone was released in 1999 in the arcades. While Crisis Zone had similar play mechanics as with Time Crisis, Crisis Zone featured solo play with a fully automatic machine gun (as opposed to the standard pistol, though the pistol can be used later in the remake version), interactive backgrounds, and a different storyline centering on the anti-terrorist tasks of elite S.T.F. trooper Claude McGarren (spelled "Croad MacGalain" in the arcade version). A PlayStation 2 remake of the title was released in 2004 and turns it into a subtitle of its full name, Time Crisis: Crisis Zone.

==== Time Crisis: Project Titan (2001) ====
A side story to the first Time Crisis game Time Crisis: Project Titan, was released in 2001 for the PlayStation, featuring a new multi-hiding system.

==== Razing Storm (2009) ====
In 2009, Razing Storm was released in the arcades. It was re-released in October 2010 with the title Time Crisis: Razing Storm, for the PS3. This version is known in Japan as Big 3 Gun Shooting and comes packaged with Deadstorm Pirates and the arcade version of Time Crisis 4. All games feature full PlayStation Move and GunCon 3 support.

=== Mobile games ===
==== Time Crisis Strike (2009) ====
Time Crisis Strike was released by Namco in January 2009 for iOS and J2ME. It is a spin-off of Time Crisis 3, with a different story.

==== Time Crisis 2nd Strike (2010) ====
Time Crisis 2nd Strike was released by Namco in September 2010 for iOS, and in May 2013 for Android (Japan only). It is the sequel of the Time Crisis spin-off and the alternate version story of Time Crisis 4. It allowed players to use another iOS device as a gun controller via the app iGunCon. It is no longer available for purchase as of March 30, 2015.
