= Time Crisis 2nd Strike =

2010 video game

- Developers: Namco Networks (iOS); Namco Bandai Games (Android)
- Publishers: Namco Networks (iOS); Namco Bandai Games (Android)
- Series: Time Crisis
- Platforms: iOS, Android
- Release: iPhone; September 15, 2010 iPad; December 21, 2010; Android: JP: May 2013
- Genre: First-person shooter
- Mode: Single-player

Time Crisis 2nd Strike was a first-person shooter developed and published by Namco Networks for iOS in 2010, and by Namco Bandai Games for Android in Japan in 2013. It is the sequel of the Time Crisis spin-off, Time Crisis Strike, and the alternate version story of Time Crisis 4. It allowed players to use another iOS device as a gun controller via the app iGunCon. It is no longer available for purchase as of March 30, 2015.

== Gameplay ==
The player advances through short, timed vignettes in which terrorists appear in fixed positions, tapping enemies to shoot them while using on‑screen pedals to duck for cover and reload; clearing all enemies in a vignette adds time to the clock, but missing a target forces the player to wait for it to reappear, creating a pattern‑based rhythm to each section, and enemies vary in toughness and distance, with some requiring multiple hits or appearing small on the screen; the player can switch among weapons such as a machine gun, shotgun, or grenade launcher, manage limited visibility while ducking, and ultimately progress through missions before unlocking a competitive mode focused on achieving the best scores or times.

== Reception ==
Reception

Aggregate score
Aggregator	Score
Metacritic	(iPhone) 66/100 (iPad) 60/100

Review scores
Publication	Score
Eurogamer	4/10
IGN	5.5/10
Pocket Gamer	2.5/5

The iOS version received "mixed or average reviews" according to the review aggregation website Metacritic.
