= The Story of Us (2025 film) =

- Theatrical release poster
- Spanish: Nosotros
- Directed by: Helena Taberna
- Screenplay by: Helena Taberna; Virginia Yagüe
- Based on: Feliz final by Isaac Rosa
- Produced by: Maribel Muñoz; Helena Taberna; Iker Ganuza
- Starring: María Vázquez; Pablo Molinero
- Cinematography: Txarli Arguiñano
- Edited by: Helena Taberna; Clara Martínez Malagelada
- Music by: Pascal Gaigne
- Production companies: Lamia Producciones; Vértigo Films; Nosotros la película AIE
- Distributed by: Vértigo Films
- Release date: 28 February 2025
- Country: Spain
- Language: Spanish

The Story of Us (Spanish: Nosotros) is a 2025 Spanish drama film directed by Helena Taberna and co-written by Virginia Yagüe based on the novel Feliz final by Isaac Rosa. It stars María Vázquez and Pablo Molinero.

== Plot ==
The plot explores the ten-year relationship as a couple between Ángela and Antonio starting from its end.

== Cast ==
- María Vázquez as Ángela
- Pablo Molinero as Antonio

== Production ==
Written by Helena Taberna and Virginia Yagüe, the screenplay is based on the novel Feliz final ('Happy Ending') by Isaac Rosa. The film was produced by Lamia Producciones, Vértigo Films, and Nosotros la película AIE with the participation of RTVE, and EiTB and backing from ICAA, the Basque Government, and the Government of Navarre. Shooting locations included Bilbao.

== Release ==
Distributed by Vértigo Films, the film was scheduled to be released theatrically in Spain on 21 February 2025, but the date was postponed to 28 February 2025.

== See also ==
- List of Spanish films of 2025
