= La vida en rojo =

- Theatrical release poster
- Directed by: Andrés Linares
- Screenplay by: Andrés Linares; Isaac Rosa
- Based on: El vano ayer by Isaac Rosa
- Starring: José Luis Gómez; Ingrid Rubio; Sergio Peris-Mencheta; Pilar Bardem; Miguel Ángel Solá
- Narrated by: José Sacristán
- Cinematography: Federico Ribes
- Edited by: Guillermo S. Maldonado
- Production company: Producciones Cinematográficas Alea
- Distributed by: Sagrera TV
- Release date: 24 October 2008
- Country: Spain
- Language: Spanish

La vida en rojo is a 2008 Spanish film directed by Andrés Linares based on the novel El vano ayer by Isaac Rosa. It stars José Luis Gómez, Ingrid Rubio, Sergio Peris-Mencheta, Pilar Bardem, and Miguel Ángel Solá.

== Plot ==
Set in Francoist Spain against the backdrop of the history of desaparecidos during the dictatorship as well as the regime's expulsion of University of Madrid's professors Aranguren, García Calvo, and Tierno in the 1960s, the plot tracks the plight of university lecturer Julio Denis and student and Communist Party of Spain member André Sánchez, disappeared after an interrogation at the Dirección General de Seguridad precinct.

== Cast ==
- José Luis Gómez as Julio Denis
- Sergio Peris-Mencheta as André Sánchez
- Pilar Bardem as Trini
- Ingrid Rubio as Marta Requejo
- Miguel Ángel Solá as comisario Ramos
- Mariano Alameda as Javier Muñoz
- Miguel Hermoso-Arnao as Miguel Arnau
- Gonzalo Ramos as Gonzalo
- Pedro Miguel Martínez as Padre
- María Teresa Berganza as Madre
- Benito Sagredo as Alberto
- Luis Perezagua as Pablo
- Pep Guiñol as Don Lope
- Mónica Cano as prostituta
- Ismael Martínez as Billy el Niño

== Production ==
Penned by Andrés Linares and Isaac Rosa, the film's screenplay is an adaptation of Rosa's work El vano ayer. The film is a Producciones Cinematográficas Alea production.

== Release ==
Distributed by Sagrera TV, the film was released theatrically in Spain on 24 October 2008.

== See also ==
- List of Spanish films of 2008
