= Time Crisis: Project Titan =

2001 video game

- European box art
- Developers: Namco; Flying Tiger Development
- Publishers: JP: Namco; NA: Namco Hometek; EU: Sony Computer Entertainment
- Producers: Masanori Kato; John Brandsetter
- Designer: John Brandsetter
- Programmer: Naoki Takishita
- Artists: Yoshinori Wagatsuma; Crystal Kanai; Tim Nign; Mike Chung
- Writers: John Brandstetter; Mike Chung; Gina Brandstetter; Nickos Constant
- Composer: Tommy Tallarico Studios
- Series: Time Crisis
- Engine: Time Crisis 1
- Platform: PlayStation
- Release: EU: April 6, 2001; JP: April 26, 2001; NA: June 19, 2001
- Genre: Rail shooter
- Mode: Single-player

Time Crisis: Project Titan (Note: Japanese: タイムクライシス プロジェクトタイタン, Hepburn: Taimu Kuraishisu: Purojekuto Taitan) is a 2001 light-gun shooter video game developed by Namco and Flying Tiger Entertainment and published by Namco for the PlayStation. It is a spin-off of Namco's Time Crisis series, serving as a direct sequel to the PlayStation port of the original Time Crisis.

== Gameplay ==
Project Titan features the same gameplay as the other Time Crisis games. It also retains the signature foot pedal. Players by default are in hiding position. They are shielded from taking fire, but they cannot fire back. In order to begin play, players must step on the pedal and begin firing. Stepping off the pad also allows the player to reload the gun.

This game introduces a new gameplay mechanic that allows the player to move to multiple fixed locations, which are activated by shooting yellow arrows while the player is hiding. This feature was later reused in the arcade version of Time Crisis 4.

== Plot ==
Several months after the events in Sercia, V.S.S.E. agent Richard Miller is informed by his superiors that Caruban president Xavier Serrano has been publicly assassinated by a man dressed like him. With no evidence to the contrary, V.S.S.E. is prepared to extradite Richard to Caruba to stand trial in 48 hours. With only that much time to prove his innocence, Richard is alerted to the presence of an undercover agent codenamed Abacus who can help him obtain the information he needs.

Meanwhile, Kantaris, the arms dealer Richard supposedly killed in a previous mission, discovers that her secretary Marisa Soleli is in fact Abacus. Unable to determine the extent of what she knows, Kantaris has Abacus taken on board her private yacht to be interrogated by her new security chief Zeus Bertrand. Richard parachutes aboard and makes his way down to the crew's quarters, where he fights a crazed chef in the kitchen. Locating and dueling Bertrand in the engine room, Richard takes him out and rescues Abacus, who reveals that a Caruban anti-government militant named Ricardo Blanco was the real killer.

Escaping the yacht by chopper just as Kantaris destroys it with explosives, Richard gets Abacus to safety before hopping a flight to Caruba International Airport. There, he fights his way through Blanco's men until he gets picked up by Abacus' contact, who takes him to Blanco's mansion. Blanco and his surviving allies fight Richard in a pitched battle in the back, dying one by one until only Blanco stands. Wounded, he tries to escape, but is immediately gunned down by Wild Dog, who survived his apparent death but lost his left arm, which he replaced with a minigun gun. A dying Blanco reveals Dog's hideout is in an abandoned nuclear research station on Rio Oro island.

Infiltrating Rio Oro and defeating Wild Dog's men, Richard destroys a weaponized drilling machine sent to kill him. He then discovers Serrano is alive and well, having been kept by Dog as a bargaining chip after his death was faked. The president reveals Wild Dog and Kantaris are conspiring to mine his country's rich titanium resources so that they can build mechanized battlesuits, under the name "Project Titan". Serrano gives Richard the project blueprints before making his escape. Richard acquires a speedboat and makes his way to the excavation site.

Engaging the surviving mercenaries in the ruins, Richard is eventually confronted by Wild Dog, who leaves two Titans codenamed Deimos and Neimos to kill him. Defeating them in a thrilling fight, Richard then takes on Wild Dog himself, damaging his gun arm. A defiant Dog activates the majority of his Titan army before making his escape via helicopter. A few well-aimed shots from Richard disable the chopper, causing it to crash into the assembled Titans and destroy them.

His name finally cleared, Richard declines an award from President Serrano in favor of tracking down Kantaris. He is last seen driving down a lone road as the sun sets in the background.

== Development ==
Time Crisis: Project Titan was developed by Namco alongside Flying Tiger Entertainment, a third-party company in the United States; Flying Tiger and its personnel were not credited in the final product in Japan. It was published by Namco as a PlayStation-only title as it serves as a sequel to the PlayStation version of the original game. The game took two years to develop. Namco opted to create a new game instead of porting over Time Crisis II since the specifications of the arcade version and the PlayStation are so different. Like other Namco games of the era, it was released by Sony Computer Entertainment in Europe.

== Reception ==
Reception

Aggregate score
Aggregator	Score
Metacritic	71/100

Review scores
Publication	Score
Electronic Gaming Monthly	5.33/10 (Note: Two critics of Electronic Gaming Monthly gave the game each a score of 6/10, and the other gave it 4/10.)
EP Daily	7/10
Famitsu	30/40
Game Informer	7/10
GameSpot	6.4/10
IGN	8.5/10
Jeuxvideo.com	11/20
Next Generation	2/5
Official U.S. PlayStation Magazine	3/5
PlayStation: The Official Magazine	7/10

Project Titan received "average" reviews according to the review aggregation website Metacritic. A major complaint about the game was the poor graphics. Ryan Davis of GameSpot called the visuals "badly outdated" and the animation "downright bad". Douglass C. Perry of IGN opined the game looked "old, dated, and bad" and that it did not look any better than the original Time Crisis PlayStation port. Eric Bratcher of NextGen said of the game, "PlayStation finally answers Saturn's Virtua Cop 2, only it's five years too late and shooting blanks." In Japan, Famitsu gave it a score of 30 out of 40. Air Hendrix of GamePro said, "If you love lightgun shooters, Titan will make for a thrilling weekend rental. Since it pretty much amounts to an add-on level pack, you'd have to be ultra-hardcore about Time Crisis to spring for your own copy." (Note: GamePro gave the game three 4/5 scores for graphics, control, and fun factor, and 3.5/5 for sound.)

The game was a nominee for The Electric Playground's 2001 Blister Awards for "Best Console Shooter Game", but lost to Halo: Combat Evolved.
