= Crisis Zone =

1999 video game

- North American arcade flyer
- Developer: Bandai Namco Studios
- Publishers: Namco; PlayStation 2: NA: Namco Hometek; EU: Sony Computer Entertainment
- Producer: Takashi Sano
- Series: Time Crisis
- Platforms: Arcade, PlayStation 2
- Release: Arcade: JP/NA: December 1999; PlayStation 2: PAL: September 17, 2004; NA: October 19, 2004
- Genres: Light gun shooter, rail shooter
- Mode: Single player
- Arcade system: Namco System 23 Evolution 2

Crisis Zone is a 1999 light-gun shooter video game developed and published by Namco for arcades. It is a spin-off of the Time Crisis series.

A port to the PlayStation 2 was released in 2004 as Time Crisis: Crisis Zone, with improved polygon textures and details and an additional mission.

== Gameplay ==
In Crisis Zone, the player controls the elite anti-terrorist Special Tactical Force (STF) leader, Claude McGarren. The game uses the same pedal system to reload and hide; however, the player uses a machine gun, a customized Heckler & Koch MP5K with a sight laser and a capacity of 40 rounds. Players take cover behind a portable ballistic shield that is strapped to the character's left arm. The "crisis flash" is replaced with a warning target icon to remind players to hide from a threatening shot, though it is possible to interrupt the enemy from shooting. Crisis Zone is the first Time Crisis game to date to allow the player to select between three levels to play in any order. Upon completion of all three of them, the player can then play the final level to beat the game.

=== PlayStation 2 version ===
European cover art

A PlayStation 2 version of the game was released in 2004 in North America, Europe and Korea. The North American and Korean versions of the game were released as Time Crisis: Crisis Zone. The PS2 version comes with more detailed polygons and textures, higher difficulty, re-recorded voice acting and an additional three-level mission taking place six months after the events of the original game; unlike the original mission, the additional missions can only be played in a linear order. The PS2 version is compatible with the Guncon 2 lightgun, and is available with a special two-player cooperative gameplay mode named "Two-Gun Mode" which allows two players to play simultaneously on a single screen without the use of split-screen. The weapon switching system is similar to Time Crisis 3, allowing the player to switch between a fully automatic machine gun, a standard 8-round handgun and a 6-shell shotgun; unlike its predecessor, all weapons now have unlimited ammunition in Crisis Zone, though they all must be reloaded. As with the PS2 versions of Time Crisis II and Time Crisis 3, the Crisis Mission exercise menu is unlocked through gradual play.

The PS2-exclusive story mode also features special weapons such as the flamethrower, the missile launcher, the laser rifle, the Gatling gun, and the grenade launcher. The downside to these weapons is that they can only be used once per area.

== Plot ==
In 2000, Garland Electric launched a new complex known as "Garland Square" on the outskirts of London. Full of modern amenities, it is considered the future of urban living. Shortly after its grand opening, however, the entire complex is taken over by the URDA, a terrorist group. The terrorists have taken no hostages and made no demands upon takeover, causing a string of confusion among intelligence officials around the world. With an unknown threat, Scotland Yard and MI6 dispatch the Special Tactical Force's (STF) First Platoon Unit (led by Claude McGarren, spelled as Croad Macgalain in the arcade version) to suppress the URDA, and to ensure that the terrorists don't access their hidden agenda, whatever it may be.

Slowly but surely, the STF liberates the Drycreek Plaza shopping mall, Garland Park, and the Garland Technology Center, eliminating the URDA's twin lieutenants Tiger and Edge (Edgey in the arcade version) and wiping out their air force and tank defenses. After securing Garland Square, McGarren receives word from Vital Situation, Swift Elimination (VSSE) officials that Derrick Lynch, the terrorists' ringleader, is attempting to overload Geyser 1, an experimental nuclear reactor built by Garland Electric to power the complex (via an Eyes Only broadcast). Making their way down to the control room, five kilometres below the complex, McGarren and his men defeat Lynch's troops before taking out the ringleader himself. McGarren shuts down and secures the nuclear reactor seconds before it melts down. After the STF evacuate and enter a nearby lift, the control room explodes. The unit declares their mission a success.

=== PlayStation 2 remake mission ===
Six months after the main story's events, Lynch's successor Jared Hunter launches another attack, seizing control of the Grassmarket District and holding STF Director Grant Kessler's daughter Melissa as a hostage. Hunter demands that the surviving URDA members be released from custody in return for Melissa's life.

McGarren and Squad 1 are deployed into Grassmarket Street in response. Fighting their way through Grassmarket Street, they defeat an experimental defense droid called the A-0940. They then storm the Belforte Hotel, where Melissa is held on the rooftop swimming pool. There, they are confronted by Hunter and his airborne attack squad. Declaring his intent for revenge, Hunter engages and loses to Squad 1, forcing him to retreat on a modified, heavily armed speedboat, but is killed when the boat is destroyed by McGarren's chopper. McGarren and his men then take Melissa to safety, having ended the URDA's terror once and for all.

== Reception ==
Reception

Aggregate score
| Aggregator | Score |
|---|---|
| Metacritic | 66/100 |

Review scores
| Publication | Score |
|---|---|
| 1Up.com | B− |
| Electronic Gaming Monthly | 7/10 |
| Eurogamer | 7/10 |
| Game Informer | 6.75/10 |
| GamePro | 3.5/5 |
| GameSpot | 6/10 |
| GameSpy | 3.5/5 |
| GameZone | 7/10 |
| IGN | 5/10 |
| Official U.S. PlayStation Magazine | 3.5/5 |
| The Sydney Morning Herald | 3.5/5 |

In Japan, Game Machine listed Crisis Zone on their February 1, 2000 issue as being the third most-successful dedicated arcade game of the month.

The 2004 remake received "average" reviews, due to being "Too much like Time Crisis 2", according to the review aggregation website Metacritic.
