= Gonzalo Ramos (actor) =

Spanish actor and singer (born 1989)

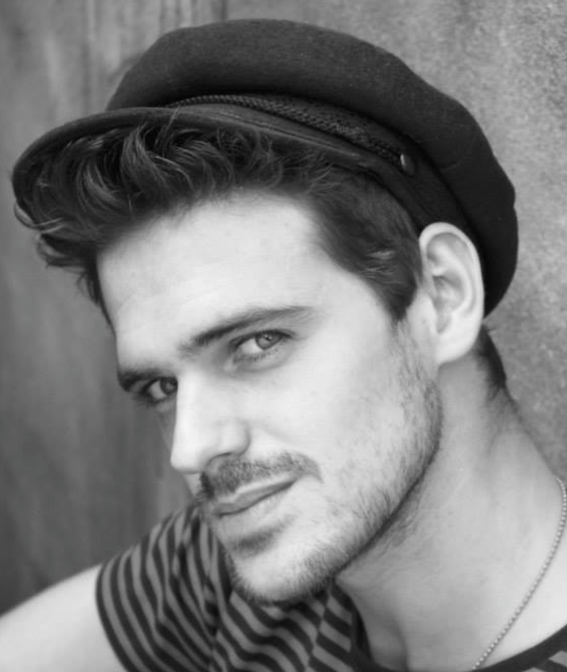
- Gonzalo Ramos in 2015.
- Born: Gonzalo Ramos Cantó; 19 September 1989 (age 36); Madrid, Spain
- Occupations: Actor; Singer
- Years active: 2004-present
- Height: 1.84 m (6 ft 1/2 in)
- Spouse: Sofia Escobar (m. 2013)
- Children: 1

Gonzalo Ramos Cantó (born 19 September 1989) is a Spanish actor and singer. He is known for playing lead roles in series Física o Química and Amar en tiempos revueltos.

== Career ==
Gonzalo Ramos started acting in 2004 when he was 14, playing the role of Jon in the feature film El Guardavías. After that he made many TV appearances playing supporting roles in prime time shows such as Hospital Central, MIR, Génesis, Hermanos y Detectives, Los Hombres de Paco, Hay que Vivir, and others. During those early years of his career, Ramos also appeared in the feature film La vida en rojo.

At the age of 18, he played a lead role in the hit Spanish series Física o Química for 3 years. During that time he also worked with director Roland Joffe in the feature film There Be Dragons, and with director Xavi Giménez in the feature film Cruzando el Límite.

Gonzalo was awarded the Atenea de Honor a una carrera emergente in the 2009 Ateneo Coste Cero International Film Festival. He then moved on to the stage to play the lead role Jose in the play Los Ochenta Son Nuestros. He then returned to television to play the lead role of Alberto Cepeda in the Spanish television series Amar en Tiempos Revueltos.

He played the lead role in the short film Y La Muerte Lo Seguía, which has been selected in over 100 festivals all over the world, and has received numerous awards.

After this, he moved to London where he appeared in the musicals A Catered Affair and A Little Night Music, both productions during his postgraduate at the Royal Academy of Music. He returned to Spain to appear as guest star in the TV series Ciega a Citas. During 2014, he directed his first short film Super Yo, with which he won Best Actor Award at the Plasencia International Shortfilm festival.

He then returned to London to play the role of Paulo in the 2015 BBC One prime time series The Interceptor.

In 2020, it is confirmed that the actor will give life to Julio de la Torre Reig in Física o químicaː El reencuentro for the platform Atresplayer Premium.

In 2021, after participating in Física o químicaː El reencuentro it was announced that he had signed for the daily series Acacias 38 to give life to Rodrigo Lluch.

== Personal life ==
On 21 September 2013 he married the Portuguese singer and actress, Sofia Escobar in an intimate ceremony in Guimarães, Portugal. On 6 March 2014 the couple's first child, a boy, was born whom they called Gabriel Ramos Escobar.

Ramos speaks Spanish, English, French and Portuguese.

== Filmography ==
=== Movies ===
| Year | Movie | Character | Director | Notes |
|---|---|---|---|---|
| 2004 | El guardavías | Jon | Andrea Trigo and Daniel Celaya | |
| 2005 | Lucía | Boy | Diego Fernández | Short film |
| 2008 | La vida en rojo | Gonzalo | Andrés Linares | |
| 2009 | Seis contra seis | | Miguel Aguirre and Marco Fettolini | Short film |
| 2010 | Cama Blanca | Waiter | Diego Betancor | Short film |
| 2010 | Cruzando el límite | Raúl | Xavi Giménez | |
| 2011 | There Be Dragons | Miguel | Roland Joffé | |
| 2011 | La noche rota | Pablo | Diego Betancor | Short film |
| 2012 | Tarde | | Diego Betancor | Short film |
| 2012 | Y la muerte lo seguía | Johnny | Ángel Gómez Hernández | Short film |
| 2013 | What Now? (Y Ahora Qué?) | | Simon Loughton | Short film |
| 2014 | Super Yo | | Gonzalo Ramos | Short film |
| 2016 | Pablo | Inspector Blázquez | Ghazaleh Golpira | Short film |
| 2017 | Nest | Thomas | Borja Sánchez | Short film |
| 2019 | We Die Young | Rapper # 1 | Lior Geller | |
| 2019 | Lo que se espera de mí | María Salgado Gispert | | Short film |
| 2019 | Solum | Scott | Diogo Morgado | |
| 2020 | Loca | Iván | María Salgado Gispert | Short film |
| 2020 | Reflejo | Toni | Bogdan Ionut Toma | Writer |
| 2021 | La familia perfecta | Pablo | Arantxa Echevarría | |

=== Television ===
| Year | Title | Character | Channel | Notes |
|---|---|---|---|---|
| 2006 | Hospital Central | Curro | Telecinco | 1 episode |
| 2007 | Génesis: En la mente del asesino | Lucas | Cuatro | 1 episode |
| 2007 | MIR | | Telecinco | 1 episode |
| 2007 | Los hombres de Paco | | Antena 3 | 1 episode |
| 2007 | Hermanos y detectives | Matías | Telecinco | 1 episode |
| 2007 | Maitena: Estados alterados | | LaSexta | 1 episode |
| 2008-2011 | Física o Química | Julio de la Torre Reig | Antena 3 | 59 episodes |
| 2011-2012 | Amar en tiempos revueltos | Carlos Robledo/Alberto Cepeda | La 1 | 227 episodes |
| 2014 | Ciega a citas | Víctor | Cuatro | 11 episodes |
| 2015 | The Interceptor | Paulo | BBC One | 1 episode |
| 2016-2017 | Reinas | | La 1 | 6 episodes |
| 2017 | Seis Hermanas | León Mijáilovic | La 1 | 14 episodes |
| 2017 | La zona | | Movistar+ | 4 episodes |
| 2018 | Servir y proteger | Yayo Cárdenas | La 1 | 3 episodes |
| 2018 | Genius | Max Aub | National Geographic | 1 episode |
| 2018 | Looser | Christian Grey | Flooxer | 1 episode |
| 2019 | The Mallorca Files | Miguel | BBC One | 1 episode |
| 2020 | Néboa | Emilio Rivera López | La 1 | 4 episodes |
| 2021 | Física o Química: El reencuentro | Julio de la Torre Reig | Atresplayer Premium | episode 2 |
| 2021 | Acacias 38 | Rodrigo Lluch | La 1 | 27 episodes |

=== Videoclips ===
| Year | Artist | Song |
|---|---|---|
| 2008 | Despistaos | Física o química |
| 2010 | Angy Fernández | Cuando Lloras |
| 2017 | Melendi | La casa no es igual |
