= Time Crisis: Razing Storm =

2010 video game

- North American cover art
- Developer: Nex Entertainment
- Publisher: Namco Bandai Games: EU: Sony Computer Entertainment
- Platform: PlayStation 3
- Release: NA: October 19, 2010; JP: October 21, 2010; EU: November 5, 2010
- Genre: Light gun shooter
- Modes: Single-player, multiplayer

Time Crisis: Razing Storm, known in Japan as Big 3 Gun Shooting, is a compilation of light gun rail shooter video games developed by Nex Entertainment and published by Namco Bandai Games for the PlayStation 3. Featuring full compatibility with both the GunCon 3 light gun and the PlayStation Move motion control system, the compilation consists of ports of various arcade games. Developed by Nex Entertainment and published by Namco Bandai Games, the compilation was released in 2010 in North America on October 19, and in Japan on October 21, which is the launch date of the PlayStation Move in Japan. It was released as part of a bundle with the PlayStation Move, PlayStation Eye and the Shooting attachment for the PlayStation Move in Japan and other Asian countries.

== Games ==
The compilation features the ports of three arcade games, namely:

Razing Storm (2009)
A spin-off of the Time Crisis series, the game takes place in a destructible environment in a South American country under a bloody revolution. Players, who fight futuristic terrorists and renegade soldiers, represent members of a special forces unit called S.C.A.R. (Strategic Combat and Rescue), sent to capture the leader of the rebels, who masterminded an attack on the United States. The First Person Shooting Mode wraps up the cliffhanger from the arcade edition of the game and fills in some of the game's plot holes.

Time Crisis 4 (2006)
A re-release of the fourth game about the trio of agents William Rush, Giorgio Bruno and Evan Bernard in their mission to stop terrorists and their biological insect-like weapons - Terror Bites - from using hidden agendas.

Deadstorm Pirates (2010)
A rail shooter game, in Deadstorm Pirates the player is given unlimited bullets and a navigation system. The story details the Pirate's attempt to find Poseidon's Breath, a treasure galleon with a valuable trinket.

== Gameplay ==
The compilation supports both the GunCon 3 light gun and the PlayStation Move motion controller system as well as vibration feedback and PlayStation Eye AV Chat.

Two-player cooperative gameplay in Time Crisis: Razing Storm, with on-screen reticles

In addition to the original arcade mode, new gameplay modes in Time Crisis: Razing Storm include a sentry mode, a story mode, and an online battle mode. In sentry mode, up to four players take turns trying to achieve a high score by stopping prisoners from escaping in the penitentiary riot scenario. Story mode and online battle mode both feature a new first-person shooter-style navigation, in which the player can freely navigate the environment "off the rails". In online battle mode, up to 8 online players can play together in any of a number of battle modes.

In addition to PlayStation Move support, Time Crisis 4: Arcade Ver. (based on the Arcade Mode from the 2007 PlayStation 3 release of Time Crisis 4) and Deadstorm Pirates both feature online ranking, and support 1–2 players.

== Reception ==
Reception

Aggregate score
Aggregator	Score
Metacritic	58/100

Review scores
Publication	Score
Destructoid	6/10
Eurogamer	5/10
Famitsu	30/40
Game Informer	6.75/10
GamePro	3/5
GameRevolution	C+
GameSpot	6/10
GameTrailers	4.8/10
GameZone	6.5/10
IGN	4/10
PlayStation: The Official Magazine	7/10
The Guardian	3/5

Razing Storm received "mixed" reviews from critics according to the review aggregation website Metacritic. IGN said, "Leave this one on the shelf, because no one should have to be this frustrated." In a slightly more positive review, GameSpot noted that "Time Crisis: Razing Storm can be fun when it sticks to its arcade roots, but everything else in this shooter package misses the target completely". In Japan, Famitsu gave it a score of one eight, two sevens, and one eight for a total of 30 out of 40.
