= Time Crisis (video game) =

1995 video game

- North American arcade flyer
- Developer: Namco
- Publishers: Namco; PlayStation: NA: Namco Hometek; EU: Sony Computer Entertainment
- Producers: Toru Iwatani; Kazunori Sawano; Takashi Sano
- Designers: Hirofuki Kami; Takashi Satsukawa
- Composer: Kazuhiro Nakamura
- Series: Time Crisis
- Platforms: Arcade, PlayStation, PlayStation 2
- Release: Arcade: WW: December 1995; PlayStation: JP: June 27, 1997; NA: November 12, 1997; PAL: November 19, 1997; PlayStation 2: JP: December 12, 2002
- Genres: Light gun shooter, rail shooter
- Mode: Single-player
- Arcade system: Namco Super System 22

Time Crisis is a 1995 light-gun shooter video game developed and published by Namco for arcades. The first installment in the Time Crisis series, the game differentiated itself from other light-gun shooters of the time by incorporating a pedal that controls when the player character takes cover to reload and avoid enemy fire. Players have a limited amount of time to clear each section by defeating enemies. The game's story focuses on Richard Miller, an intelligence agent, who is ordered by his superiors to rescue an abducted woman from a vicious tyrant seeking to reclaim control of their former country from their homeland's new government.

A port of the game for the PlayStation was released in 1997, as part of a bundle coinciding with the launch of the Guncon light gun controller, and featured an add-on pack of additional stages that are set after the main story. Both the arcade original and the console version were well-received by critics, in particular the gameplay mechanics. The game proved a commercial success and spawned a sequel, Time Crisis II, in 1997 while the PlayStation version had its own sequel, Time Crisis: Project Titan, in 2001.

== Gameplay ==
Time Crisis is a three-dimensional first-person rail shooter similar to Virtua Cop, in that the player holds a light gun and fires at on-screen enemies. However, it differs from such video games by use of its cover system - a gameplay mechanic in which players can duck behind cover to avoid enemy fire and reload their weapons. In the arcade version, a foot pedal is used to toggle between ducking and attacking positions; in console conversions, a button command replicates the foot pedal's functions. The PlayStation version also allows players to use the pedal from a racing wheel peripheral.

The game consists of three stages, each consisting of three areas and a boss battle. Each area consist of a series of gunfights, in which players must defeat a predetermined group of enemies in order to advance to the next battle. Each area features a one minute time limit to begin with, which counts down during battles and transitions between each, and is only extended by clearing a current battle; defeating specific optional enemies also provides a few extra seconds. To avoid running down the clock, the player must take risks, shooting enemies rapidly and hiding only when necessary. Each playthrough sees the player given a predetermined number of lives, in which one is deducted when the player is hit by an enemy, or fails to avoid being hit by a hazard in the current battle, with the game being over when the player runs out of lives or time.

The arcade cabinet's light gun (introduced in Point Blank) utilizes a special memory chip to synchronize areas of the screen's image as the player rotates the gun around. The light gun also features a blowback function which simulates real-life gun recoil; this feature is not retained in the PlayStation port. The PlayStation port can be played either with the GunCon light gun peripheral or by using a controller to aim a cursor around the screen. The port features an exclusive Special mode, in which the player's performance, such as how quickly they can clear an area, affects the path they take through the game, resulting in multiple possibilities and endings.

== Plot ==
In 1995, the V.S.S.E., a global intelligence agency, helps Sercian opposition leader William MacPherson engineer a coup that overthrows a century-old authoritarian regime. MacPherson successfully wins the election as the Sercian republic's first democratically elected president. Sherudo Garo, the last survivor of the previous regime's family, schemes to restore the old order, ordering a series of attacks and assassinations that destabilize the nation. As one of the last phases of his plan, Garo orders President MacPherson's daughter Rachel abducted and imprisoned in Mr Garo's family's castle on an isolated island, demanding vital military secrets in exchange for her life. A desperate MacPherson contacts the V.S.S.E., who in turn dispatches veteran agent Richard Miller, the "One Man Army", to infiltrate the castle and rescue Rachel.

Richard reaches the island and rams his explosives-rigged boat into the castle's exterior to create an entrance. Sherudo hears the resulting boom, but his head of security, Wild Dog, assures him that Richard will not survive long against his highly trained mercenaries. Meanwhile, Richard confronts Wild Dog's troops in the submarine hangar and makes his way to the main courtyard against heavy resistance, eventually reaching Rachel's location. She warns him of a setup before being whisked away. Richard is confronted by Sherudo's chief assassin Moz and his unit. He defeats them and interrogates Moz, who reveals that Rachel has been transferred to the clock tower. There, Richard is attacked by Sherudo, a trained knife thrower, and guns him down, only to find Rachel held at gunpoint by Wild Dog. Angered by Sherudo's death, Wild Dog reveals his intentions to blow up the castle with Richard inside and escape with Rachel. Pursuing them to the castle's helipad, Richard arrives just as Rachel manages to break free, leading Wild Dog to shoot her. A furious Richard engages Wild Dog in a fast-and-loose gun battle across the rooftop, during which Dog accidentally sets off his detonator, apparently killing himself in a fiery explosion. Richard collects the wounded Rachel and escapes in Wild Dog's chopper just as the rest of the castle goes up in flames.

The PlayStation version features a special mission known as the "Kantaris Deal", which takes place several weeks after the main story's events. Richard is alerted by V.S.S.E. to the presence of an illegal arms factory posing as a Sercian hotel, with ties to Wild Dog's organization. He is assigned to infiltrate the factory and eliminate its owner, Kantaris. Upon clearing the lobby, Richard has three different paths to his target. The first takes him through the ballroom/casino, where he eliminates Kantaris' boomerang-flinging assassin, Web Spinner. He then pursues her to the swimming pool just as she attempts to escape by air. After shooting down an escort gunship, Richard damages the engines of Kantaris' ship just as it takes off, causing it to crash and explode. Should Richard fail to stop Web Spinner in time, he will instead be taken to the arms factory; and should Richard fail to pursue Kantaris in time, he will instead be taken to Kantaris' office in the lounge. The second path, which can only be accessed if there are less than 22 seconds left on the clock, instead goes through the shopping mall and down into a garbage disposal. There, Richard uses a claw arm to punch a hole in the wall, allowing him to access the underground arms factory. From there, he makes his way to Kantaris' office in the lounge and defeats her personal security droid, which then malfunctions and rolls out the window, taking her with it. Should Richard fail his pursuit in the arms factory, he will instead be redirected to the parking lot. The third path can be made available if Richard does not activate the claw in time. Instead of entering the factory, he goes directly through the parking lot. After defeating a spider-legged battle tank, Richard disables Kantaris' car, forcing it to crash. If in any of these scenarios Richard fails to take action soon enough, Kantaris escapes and the mission is aborted (canonically, the spin-off game Time Crisis: Project Titan takes place after the mission's failure).

== Development ==
North American PlayStation box art

Though both the arcade and PlayStation versions were developed internally at Namco, none of the arcade development team had any direct involvement with the PlayStation version. Since the PlayStation's CPU speed is much lower than that of the System 22 arcade hardware, the team reduced demands on the PlayStation CPU by cutting the game's frame rate in half, reducing the number of polygons used, emulating the real-time lighting by coloring the polygons one-by-one, and delaying the appearance of enemies so that only a certain number of enemies could appear on-screen at any time.

The development team took photos of hotels and factories in the Tokyo area as reference for the PlayStation mode's hotel design. To make the large areas in the hotel work on the hardware, the team left the portions of these areas not visible to the player unrendered. Three planned sequences - an outdoor restaurant, a missile room explosion, and a boat race - were left out because the team eventually realized that creating them was not practical, at least not within the time they had to complete the PlayStation version. New music was recorded for the Special Mission mode by Tatsuro Tani and Tomoko Tat2, using a "synthesized orchestra" of 50 individually synthesized instruments.

== Soundtrack ==
A soundtrack Time Crisis Arcade Soundtrack was released in 1997. Another soundtrack Time Crisis 3D Sound Ensemble was released later. It contains audio dramas that depict events during and before the first game, such as Miller's battle against Sherudo from the game.

== Reception ==
Reception

Aggregate score
Aggregator	Score
GameRankings	86% (PS)

Review scores
Publication	Score
AllGame	4.5/5 (ARC); 4/5 (PS)
Computer and Video Games	3/5 (ARC); 5/5 (PS)
Edge	8/10 (PS)
Electronic Gaming Monthly	7.75/10 (PS)
Famitsu	9/10, 7/10, 8/10, 8/10
Game Informer	8.25/10 (PS)
GameRevolution	B+ (PS)
GameSpot	8.4/10 (PS)
Hyper	91% (PS)
IGN	8/10 (PS)
Next Generation	5/5 (ARC); 4/5 (PS)
Play	90% (PS)
Dengeki PlayStation	85/100, 80/100, 85/100, 90/100

The Japanese arcade magazine Game Machine listed Time Crisis as being the most-successful arcade game of the month in April 1996.

Next Generation hailed the game as being superior even to competitor Sega's Virtua Cop 2, primarily due to the unique foot pedal maneuver. The reviewer remarked that "By creating this innovative maneuvering technique, in addition to time-based, predetermined path running, providing Story or Attack mode and challenging end-level bosses, Time Crisis thrusts the light-gun genre into a brand-new territory - and develops a whole new way of looking at, and playing, the classic light-gun game."

The PlayStation version received "favorable" reviews according to the review aggregation website GameRankings. Critics applauded the close conversion of the arcade game, and said the special PlayStation mode greatly extended the game's lifespan, and was even superior to the original arcade campaign. And though GamePro questioned the accuracy of the bundled GunCon peripheral, reporting that "there are times when dead-on shots seem to miss", the overwhelming majority of critics deemed it the best light gun yet released for the PlayStation.

A number of critics found that despite the innovative ducking mechanic, the game is too simplistic, in particular that it lacks any powerups or innocent bystanders that the player must avoid shooting. The lack of a multiplayer mode was also criticized, since this was a standard feature in light gun shooters. The British Computer and Video Games complained at the slowness of the PAL conversion, with reviewer Tom Guise saying that though he otherwise preferred Time Crisis over Virtua Cop, when it came to the games' respective British home releases he favored the fully PAL-optimized Virtua Cop. However, these criticisms had little impact on overall recommendations; Guise concluded that "these factors cannot stop this game from being a High Five" and Next Generation stated that "when compared to other light-gun shooters for home systems, Time Crisis is as good as it gets."

There was some disagreement over which of the PlayStation version's three methods of emulating the arcade version's foot pedal was best. GameSpot praised the reload button on the GunCon for forcing the player to use a more realistic two-handed grip, while Computer and Video Games and Electronic Gaming Monthly both said stepping on the standard joypad's buttons offers the best combination of accuracy and similarity to the foot pedal.

Electronic Gaming Monthly named the PlayStation version "Light Gun Game of the Year" at their 1997 Editors' Choice Awards, noting that the game won the unanimous vote of the editors. While they added that this was not as much of an accomplishment as it normally would be, due to the weakness of that year's competition for the category, they also said the win was well-earned by Time Crisis's graphics, sound effects, and additional modes of play.
