= Time Crisis 3 =

2003 video game

- North American arcade flyer
- Developers: Namco; Nextech
- Publishers: Namco; PlayStation 2: NA: Namco Hometek; EU: Sony Computer Entertainment
- Director: Takashi Satsukawa
- Producer: Hajime Nakatani
- Composer: Takeshi Miura
- Series: Time Crisis
- Platforms: Arcade, PlayStation 2
- Release: Arcade: NA: February 2003; JP: April 1, 2003; PlayStation 2: NA: October 21, 2003; EU: October 31, 2003; JP: November 20, 2003
- Genre: Rail shooter
- Modes: Single-player, multiplayer
- Arcade system: Namco System 246

Time Crisis 3 is a 2003 light-gun shooter video game developed by Namco and Nextech and published by Namco for arcades. It is the third installment of the Time Crisis series. Like its predecessor, Time Crisis II, it allows for two players to cooperate in a link play environment and has the Time Crisis signature pedal system for hiding and advancing and the first in the series to change or select weapons. It was later ported to the PlayStation 2.

== Gameplay ==
Time Crisis 3 incorporates a new type of weapons system allowing the player to switch between the standard 9-round handgun, a fully automatic machine gun that can hold 200 rounds, a shotgun with 50 shells and a 5-round grenade launcher with powerful splash damage. Only the handgun has unlimited ammunition, though players can shoot yellow-clad soldiers to gain ammunition for their other weapons. This feature was later used in the port of Crisis Zone, with some changes.

The game also refines the crisis flash system which life-threatening shots are brighter, making pedal-releasing advisories easier.

=== PlayStation 2 version ===
The PlayStation 2 version includes plot elements, features and weapons not found in its arcade counterpart. Alicia Winston is featured as a playable character, having been an unplayable supporting character in the arcade version of the game. Gameplay for Alicia is, for the most part, the same as the regular campaign, with occasional sections in which the player must use a sniper rifle to deal with enemy snipers. Players can access the Crisis Mission exercise menu through prolonged gameplay.

== Plot ==
In 2003, 6 years after Time Crisis II, Astigos, the largest island in the Mediterranean nation of Lukano, is invaded by special forces from the neighboring Zagorian Federation. Led by dictator General Giorgio Zott, the invaders conquer 80% of Astigos in a matter of weeks despite international protests. Meanwhile, the surviving Lukano defenders organize themselves into the Lukano Liberation Force under Daniel Winston. Learning that the Zagorian forces have set up a base in the abandoned Astigos State Observatory, Daniel and his lieutenant Jake Hernandez lead a small force to infiltrate and destroy it. Once inside, however, they are captured by waiting Zagorian troops.

A week later, Daniel's sister Alicia undertakes a solo mission to infiltrate a Zagorian bunker. Inside, she downloads intelligence that leads her to discover the Zagorians have acquired tactical ballistic missiles, which they intend to use to eliminate the rest of the LLF and potentially threaten neighboring nations. Alicia transmits the info to her contact at the V.S.S.E., who in turn gets the agency to dispatch agents Alan Dunaway and Wesley Lambert to destroy the missiles. Posing as fishermen, Alan and Wesley launch an attack on Marano Beach but are quickly cornered into a shipwreck by the Zagorian defenders. Their leader, Air Force Colonel Victor Zahn, attacks them in his heavily armed gunship. Alicia manages to steal a jeep and rescue the agents, then helps them to shoot down Zahn. The three make their way to Astigos Town Center, where they are separated in a surprise attack. Alan and Wesley fight their way through town and the forest to reach a supply train heading up to Zott's compound. Meanwhile, Alicia is confronted by Jake, who is revealed to be the greedy traitor who sold out Daniel for the love of money. After running Jake out of town, Alicia links up with the agents at the trainyard.

Randy Garrett, the head of Zott's "Assassin Squad", leads them into an ambush, during which he destroys the bridge, causing the train to fall into the river. After finishing off Garrett and his men, Alan, Wesley and Alicia approach the base, where they once again split up to defeat the exterior defenders. Alan and Wesley are confronted by hired gunman Wild Dog — who was seemingly killed during the events involving the NeoDyne incident — with his new protégé, Wild Fang, who has greatly enhanced leg strength. In the ensuing battle, Fang is apparently killed, but Dog once again commits self-detonates via explosives to evade capture. Zott prepares to execute Daniel in revenge, but Alicia shoots the pistol out of his hand with a sniper rifle. Alan and Wesley chase Zott into the compound while Alicia liberates Daniel's men from captivity. Arming themselves, the fighters arrive just in time to save the agents from Zott's soldiers. At the same time, Alicia catches Jake trying to escape with a stolen nuclear warhead. She disables his ship, forcing him to detonate his cargo prematurely. Using her sniper skills, Alicia simultaneously destroys the detonator and kills Jake before sending the burning wreckage crashing into the sea.

Alan and Wesley confront Zott inside the main dome and shoot him dead, but not before he initiates the launch. Using rocket launchers, the two destroy the dome's roof, causing it to cave in and destroy the missiles. Around the same time after Alicia rejoins her brother, the V.S.S.E. agents manage to escape the dome safely.

Their mission a success, Alan and Wesley return home, while the LLF ultimately defeats the Zagorians and forces them out of Lukano, freeing Astigos Island.

== Mobile phone spin-off ==
A spin-off of Time Crisis 3, Time Crisis Mobile (3D), was released on mobile phones and later re-ported in 2009 to the iPhone OS with the name Time Crisis Strike.

== Reception ==
Reception

Aggregate score
Aggregator	Score
Metacritic	81/100

Review scores
Publication	Score
Edge	6/10
Electronic Gaming Monthly	7.5/10
Eurogamer	8/10
Famitsu	35/40
Game Informer	7.5/10
GamePro	5/5
GameSpot	7.6/10
GameZone	8.6/10
IGN	8.4/10
Official U.S. PlayStation Magazine	4.5/5
X-Play	4/5

The game received "favorable" reviews according to the review aggregation website Metacritic.
