= Time Crisis 4 =

2006 video game

- North American arcade flyer
- Developers: Namco Bandai Games; Nex Entertainment
- Publisher: Namco Bandai Games: EU: Sony Computer Entertainment
- Director: Takashi Satsukawa
- Producer: Hajime Nakatani
- Designers: Hajime Nakatani; Takashi Satsukawa
- Writer: Katsuyuki Sugano
- Composer: Takeshi Miura
- Series: Time Crisis
- Platforms: Arcade, PlayStation 3
- Release: Arcade: JP: June 20, 2006; NA: July 2006; PlayStation 3: NA: November 20, 2007; JP: December 20, 2007; EU: April 18, 2008; AU: April 24, 2008; Razing Storm: NA: October 19, 2010; JP: October 21, 2010
- Genre: Light gun shooter
- Modes: Single-player, multiplayer
- Arcade system: Namco System Super 256

Time Crisis 4 is a 2006 light-gun shooter video game developed by Namco Bandai Games and Nex Entertainment and published by Namco Bandai Games for arcades. It is the fourth main installment of the Time Crisis series. It was ported to the PlayStation 3 in 2007, where it features a new first-person shooter mode. It was later re-released as part of Time Crisis: Razing Storm with support for the PlayStation Move controller, without the first-person shooter mode.

== Gameplay ==
Time Crisis 4 introduces new and returning features from previous games. The multiple weapon system introduced in Time Crisis 3, with the pistol, machine gun, shotgun and grenade launcher, and also features new vehicle sections. On several occasions, the player equips a machine gun with infinite ammo or a sniper rifle used to shoot the tires on a marauding truck. Several other functions exclusive to the game includes a scene where the player can escape from quicksand, several scenes where a certain position must be defended, with the penalty of one life if the position is lost. On multiple occasions, Rush appears onscreen, whether caught in a trap or attacking an enemy as a diversion, and care must be taken to avoid shooting him. It featured a voice navigation system that guides players through different situations. It can be set to speak Japanese or English. Prior to the game, it was voiced exclusively in English.

=== PlayStation 3 version ===
European PlayStation 3 box art

The PlayStation 3 is bundled with the GunCon 3 light gun peripheral. This edition features 480p (4:3) and 720p (16:9 widescreen) support and a specially-programmed first-person shooter mode, where players engage combat similar to a typical FPS game, but with manual gun pointing, aiming and firing in addition to arcade mode. The GunCon 3 is fully compatible with both standard and high-definition televisions. Players control William Rush, Giorgio Bruno or Evan Bernard for each levels throughout the game with arcade footages. Much like its predecessors, it featured the Crisis Missions that has some backstories, starring star of Time Crisis characters from previous installments. The game was re-released for PlayStation 3 as part of Time Crisis: Razing Storm, released in October 2010, with support for PlayStation Move controllers but without the first-person shooter mode.

== Plot ==
The game opens in California, where intelligence officials from the United States Armed Forces and V.S.S.E. organization learn about a top secret weapon targeted for terrorists' smuggling and their plot. Captain William Rush infiltrates a pier to gather information, and learns that the enemy acquired insect-like weapons, Terror Bites. Informed by Elizabeth Conway about the incident at San Francisco International Airport, Rush accompanies VSSE agents Giorgio Bruno and Evan Bernard, and they kill terrorist leader Marcus Black in downtown San Francisco. They discover United States Army dog tags on each soldiers. The terrorist faction is then revealed to be the Biological Weapons Special Operations Unit (also known as the Hamlin Battalion). Rush then gathers more intel about the Hamlin Battalion and defeats Hamlin lieutenant Frank Mathers in a nearby dam, who dies via detonation. He discovers that the occupation of the dam was a diversion for the main unit to make their next move in stealing the Terror Bites. Giorgio, Evan and Rush fly to Wyoming's secluded bio-weapons research facility in Yellowstone National Park, but are too late to stop the supply of Terror Bites from being stolen. After killing Frank's older brother Jack Mathers, they soon learn that the Hamlin Battalion is attacking Buckley Air Force Base in Aurora, Colorado, prompting the men to depart for the base. As they arrive, a number of unmanned combat aerial vehicles (UCAVs) depart the base without warning. Rush leads the Colorado National Guard toward an entrance, while Giorgio and Evan try to take care of the UCAVs. They also encounter V.S.S.E.'s old enemy Wild Dog in the base who, in addition to his standard handgun, minigun and RPG, is now armed with a grappling hook and tractor beam device. After a long battle, Giorgio and Evan defeat him, ending with Wild Dog detonating himself once again. Meanwhile, Rush defeats Wild Fang (Wild Dog's younger partner from the previous game), sending him into the path of a UCAV as it lifts off. It is revealed that the Terror Bites' creator, Colonel Gregory Barrows hijacked the nuclear-armed UCAVs to destroy the United States in retaliation for the poor treatment he received from the military. After Giorgio and Evan kill Barrows near the control center, Rush and his unit form a human pyramid to lift Giorgio and Evan into it to stop the missiles, where the agents press a big red button on the control computers to self-destruct all nuclear missiles the UCAVs have launched.

== Development ==
The game was first shown at E3 2006 prior to its recent final revision arcade release. One major change is the addition of the multi-screen or multi-hiding system, introduced in Time Crisis: Project Titan. Unlike the game, which players went on the offensive, players are placed on the defensive. In Project Titan, players can hide and shoot arrows to switch screens. Screen switching has been refined to allow the player to merely point the gun outside the screen to move around. The game utilizes a new light gun control with infrared emitters. Prior to this, all Namco light gun games used gun controllers relying on cathode ray timing. Because the light guns with cathode ray timing utilized memory chip-to-lens pointing, the arcade cabinet designers had to ensure the infrared-emitting light gun controllers would provide the same accuracy as their cathode ray timing-based gun provided in the past. This delayed the game's release given past accuracy issues with IR light guns. The player can choose to customize gun calibration, and turn the blowback on or off with a pre-game code explained in the cabinet. The game, like its predecessors is available either in a 29" standard twin cabinet or a 52" deluxe twin. It was released in North America at arcades in July 2006.

== Reception ==
Reception

Aggregate scores
Aggregator	Score
GameRankings	60.70%
Metacritic	60/100

Review scores
Publication	Score
Edge	5/10
Electronic Gaming Monthly	3.67/10
Eurogamer	5/10
Game Informer	4.25/10
GamePro	4/5
GameRevolution	D+
GameSpot	5.5/10
GameSpy	3.5/5
GameTrailers	6.4/10
GameZone	7.7/10
IGN	8/10; 6.8/10 (AU)
PlayStation: The Official Magazine	4/5

The game received mixed reviews, with an average GameRankings score of 60.70%, and a Metacritic score of 60 out of 100. GameSpot gave the game a 5.5 out of 10, while Jeff Haynes of IGN gave it an 8 out of 10, concluding that it is "a fun game for any shooting fan looking to blast away with their PS3". Matt Miller of Game Informer, however, was more critical of the game, giving it a score of 4.25 out of 10, criticizing its first-person shooter mode, "ludicrous plot", and shooting mechanic. GamePro rated Time Crisis 4 a positive score of 4 out of 5, saying the games plays just like the arcade, but replayability is an issue. X-Play also gave the game a score of 4 out of 5.

One of the main key areas was the GunCon 3 controller included with the game. Chris Remo of Shacknews wrote that it uses "two analog sticks for full movement and camera control, with pointer-based aiming on top" and that once "you get accustomed to it, this control actually works just fine, and feels like it could be the basis for its own game". According to Miller, however, the controller "feels cheap", with analog sticks that are "chintzy and hard to use"; referring to the left-hand subgrip which forces the main shooting handgrip to be held with the right hand, Miller claims that the GunCon 3 "hardly accommodates left-handed players". Ryan Davis of GameSpot expressed that the complexity of the control scheme seems to contradict the pick-up-and-play mentality of the light gun genre.
