= Sergio Peris-Mencheta =

Spanish actor and theatre director (born 1975)

- Peris-Mencheta in 2026
- Born: Luis Sergio Peris-Mencheta Barrio; 7 April 1975 (age 51); Madrid, Spain
- Occupations: Actor; stage director
- Years active: 1997–present
- Spouse: Marta Solaz (m. 2017)
- Children: 2

Luis Sergio Peris-Mencheta Barrio (born 7 April 1975), better known as Sergio Peris-Mencheta, is a Spanish actor and theatre director.

== Early life ==
Luis Sergio Peris-Mencheta Barrio was born on 7 April 1975 in Madrid, son to a Spanish father and a Moscow-born mother, daughter of Spanish exiles. A rugby union player for the team of the Lycée Français, he also was part of international teams that won several championships, and was captain of his youth team. After finishing secondary school, he enrolled at the Charles III University of Madrid, but while participating in the university theater group directed by Inés París he discovered a desire to become an actor.

== Career ==
In 1998, Peris-Mencheta landed a role in teen drama television series Al salir de clase, which earned him popularity. He played Dani Daroca, one of the students of the Siete Robles school.

He made his feature film debut in Jara (1999), in which he starred alongside the also debuting Olivia Molina and seasoned actress Ángela Molina. He portrayed Tato, a man who finds a mysterious and beautiful woman (Jara) living alone in the forest since she was a child, starting a murky relationship.

In 2017 he made his American television debut in Snowfall, in which he played a former Mexican luchador employed by a drug cartel in 1980s Los Angeles. The series ran for 6 seasons, from 2017-2023.

== Personal life ==
In 2017, he married actress Marta Solaz, with whom he has 2 children. In January 2024, Peris-Mencheta announced that he was suffering from an unspecified type of cancer, which was later disclosed to be chronic myelomonocytic leukemia (CMML).

== Filmography ==
Key
†	Denotes works that have not yet been released

Year	Title	Role	Notes
1999	Jara	Tato	Feature film debut
2000	El arte de morir	Ramón	
2000	Menos es más	Carlos	
2001	Dama de Porto Pim	Lucas	
2003	Les Marins perdus	Nedim	
2004	Secret Agents	Raymond	
2004	Earth's Skin	Pablo	
2004	Tiovivo c. 1950	Joven Detenido	
2006	Toi et moi	Pablo	
2006	The Borgia	Cesare Borgia	
2007	Luz de domingo		
2007	His Majesty Minor	Karkos	
2008	La vida en rojo	André Sánchez	
2010	18 Meals	Sergio	
2010	Love Ranch	Armando Bruza	
2010	Resident Evil: Afterlife	Ángel Ortiz	
2011	El Capitán Trueno y el Santo Grial	Capitán Trueno	
2012	La mémoire dans la chair	Tomás	
2012-2013	Isabel	Gonzalo Fernández de Córdoba	17 episodes
2015	Hablar	"El Profeta"	
2015	The Evil That Men Do	Martin	
2016	Estirpe	Sergio Peris-Mencheta	
2016	Los comensales	Sergio	
2017	Llueven vacas	Fernando	
2017-2023	Snowfall	Gustavo "El Oso" Zapata	Main Cast (57 episodes)
2018	Life Itself	Javier González	
2019	Close to His Chest	Antonio	(segment "Princesa de hielo")
2019	Rambo: Last Blood	Hugo Martinez	
2021	S.O.Z: Soldiers or Zombies	Marroquin	Amazon Tv Series
2021	Xtreme	Finito	
2022	Boundless	Capitan Cartagena	
2023	Meg 2: The Trench	Montes	
