= Time Crisis II =

1997 video game

- North American arcade flyer
- Developer: Namco
- Publishers: Namco; PlayStation 2: NA: Namco Hometek; EU: Sony Computer Entertainment
- Director: Takashi Satsukawa
- Producer: Takashi Sano
- Composer: Kaz Nakamura
- Series: Time Crisis
- Platforms: Arcade, PlayStation 2
- Release: Arcade: JP: December 13, 1997; NA: February 1998; PlayStation 2: NA: October 2, 2001; JP: October 4, 2001; EU: October 19, 2001; AU: October 26, 2001
- Genre: Rail shooter
- Modes: Single-player, multiplayer
- Arcade system: Namco System 23, Super Namco System 23

Time Crisis II is a 1997 light-gun shooter video game developed and published by Namco for arcades. It is the second installment in the Time Crisis series. The game incorporates the same mechanics of its predecessor, with some minor changes, but with the addition of co-operative two-player gaming. The game's story focuses on the efforts of two secret agents, Keith Martin and Robert Baxter, as they attempt to thwart the efforts of an industry mogul's plan for world dominance.

The game was ported to the PlayStation 2 in October 2001, as part of a bundle to coincide with the launch of the GunCon 2 controller (G-Con 2 in Europe), with enhanced graphics. A port for the Dreamcast was cancelled during development. The game received mostly favorable reviews for the arcade and console versions. A sequel to the game, Time Crisis 3, was released in 2003.

== Gameplay ==
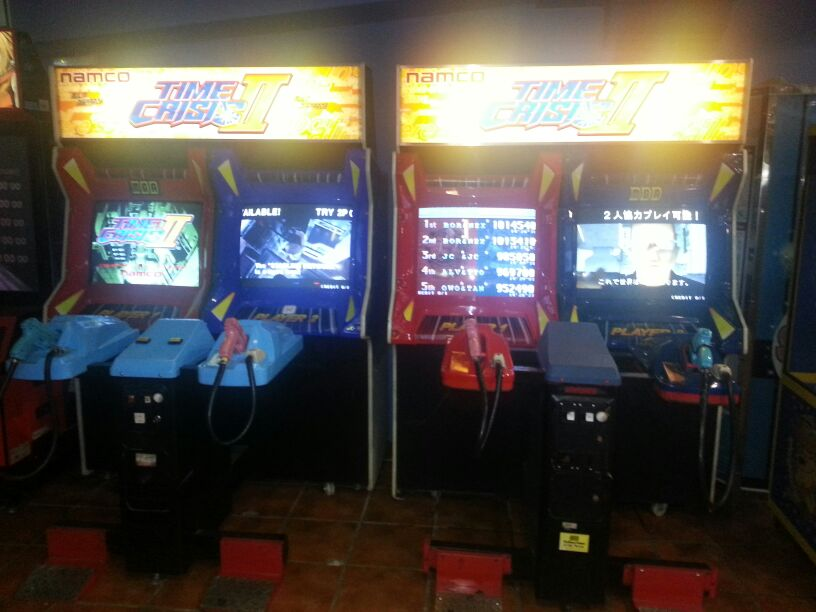
The game's arcade machines

The game utilizes the foot pedal system, just like Time Crisis, allowing players to hide from enemy fire. The "crisis flash" system alerts players when the enemy's attack would cause a direct hit, a feature not present in its predecessor, Time Crisis. When pressing down on the pedal, the player comes out of hiding and can shoot enemies. Releasing the pedal puts the player behind cover to avoid bullets and reload the weapon, though the player cannot shoot while hiding. Certain sections of the game give players a machine gun with unlimited ammo.

The player loses a life if hit by a critical bullet or an obstacle, and the game ends when the player loses all lives. Players also lose a life if the time limit (which is replenished after each area is cleared) drops to zero, unlike the first game, where running out of time results in a game over. Players can continue from their current position, as opposed to the PlayStation version of Time Crisis, which requires players to restart from the beginning of a section.

This was the first Time Crisis game to enable two people to play simultaneously, allowing each player to cover the other. In single player, the computer controls the other character. The arcade version used connecting cabinets to allow another player to join. The PlayStation 2 version features split-screen and System Link functionality, which requires two televisions, two consoles, two copies of the game, and an iLink cable. Points are deducted for shooting the other player, though neither player will lose lives as a result. The same system is utilized for events in Time Crisis 3 and Time Crisis 4.

== Plot ==
In 1997, NeoDyne Industries announces it plan to launch a series of 64 satellites, codenamed the "StarLine Network", that will help to unify the world's communication networks. However, V.S.S.E. agent Christy Ryan discovers that the company's CEO, a Gen Ernesto Diaz, plans to launch an experimental nuclear satellite into space and sell it to the highest bidder, and is using StarLine as a front. Escaping to a safehouse with a suitcase of incriminating data, she quickly finds herself tracked down and captured by NeoDyne mercenaries, led by Jakov Kinisky, moments before V.S.S.E. agents Keith Martin and Robert Baxter arrive to collect her. While Christy is taken to Diaz, Kinisky flees with the suitcase, forcing the agents to pursue him. After killing him during a boat chase, the pair retrieve the case and learn that the experimental satellite is being transported by train.

Locating the train, Keith and Robert board and attempt to destroy it, but are thwarted by NeoDyne forces led by Buff Bryant, who manages to extract the satellite by helicopter but dies battling the agents. Surviving the subsequent derailment, the agents hijack a mercenary helicopter and make their way to NeoDyne's remote oceanic spaceport, encountering further resistance led by Wild Dog - a former crimeboss thought killed in a previous V.S.S.E. operation. Both agents are forced into a firefight with Dog, who keeps them at bay with a prosthetic minigun and additional assistance from Diaz, but is defeated. He escapes with self-detonation by explosives, leaving the agents to focus on the satellite.

After rescuing Christy, Keith and Robert focus on Diaz, who initiates the launch sequence before activating the defense system of a prototype satellite to engage them. With precious few seconds on the clock, Keith and Robert destroy the prototype and shoot Diaz in the chest, sending him falling to his death. Without him to finish the sequence, the rocket malfunctions and explodes. Christy fishes out Keith and Robert from the waters before the trio are extracted by the V.S.S.E. just as the rest of the base goes up in flames.

=== PlayStation 2 port ===
North American PlayStation 2 box art

The PlayStation 2 version of the game featured enhanced graphics and additional cutscenes. It was packaged with the GunCon 2 lightgun peripheral, although it was also compatible with the GunCon 45. When completed enough times, the player could unlock alternative weapons, such as a machine gun or shotgun, and had the option of wielding two lightguns at a time (with combinations of both GunCon 2 and original GunCon possible). There is also a Crisis Mission mode, in which the players have to complete and perform various tasks, including a simulated gun duel against Richard Miller, the lead protagonist of the first Time Crisis game. Extras also included a clay pigeon shooting mode (including a port of Namco's Shoot Away II light gun clay shooting arcade game), and a virtual port of the mechanical arcade game, Quick & Crash.

== Development ==
Time Crisis 2 was first publicly unveiled at the January 1998 Amusement Trades Exhibition International in London.

== Reception ==
Reception

Aggregate score
Aggregator	Score
Metacritic	81/100

Review scores
Publication	Score
AllGame	3.5/5
Computer and Video Games	8/10
Edge	6/10
Electronic Gaming Monthly	7.5/10
Eurogamer	7/10
Famitsu	32/40
Game Informer	8.25/10
GamePro	4.5/5
GameRevolution	B
GameSpot	7.2/10
GameSpy	80%
GameZone	8/10
IGN	8.7/10
Next Generation	(arcade) 4/5 (PS2) 3/5
Official U.S. PlayStation Magazine	4/5
Maxim	8/10

In Japan, Game Machine listed Time Crisis II on their June 15, 1998 issue as being the second most-successful dedicated arcade game of the week. It went on to be the sixth Japanese highest-grossing arcade game of 1999 and 2001 respectively.

The game was met with positive reviews upon release. Edge gave the arcade version the award for 1998 Coin-Op of the Year, above Sega Rally 2 and Get Bass. Edge described Time Crisis II's "separate-screen" two-player mode as "one of the most convincing forms of cooperative play ever seen in the arcade". AllGame gave it a score of four-and-a-half stars out of five.

Next Generation reviewed the arcade version and commented: "Not as big a milestone as the first, but definitely a superb game from Namco". They were less enthusiastic about the PlayStation 2 conversion, saying that while it was "great for what it is", wasn't as good as other lightgun shooters.

Metacritic, which assigns a normalised rating in the 0–100 range, calculated an average score of 81 out of 100 ("Favorable") for the PlayStation 2 version, based on reviews from 21 professional critics. In Japan, Famitsu scoring Time Crisis II with GunCon 2 bundle a score of 32 out of 40. the PlayStation 2 version of Time Crisis II was a nominee for The Electric Playground's 2001 Blister Awards for "Best Console Shooter Game", but lost to Halo: Combat Evolved.
