= Isaac Rosa =

Spanish writer

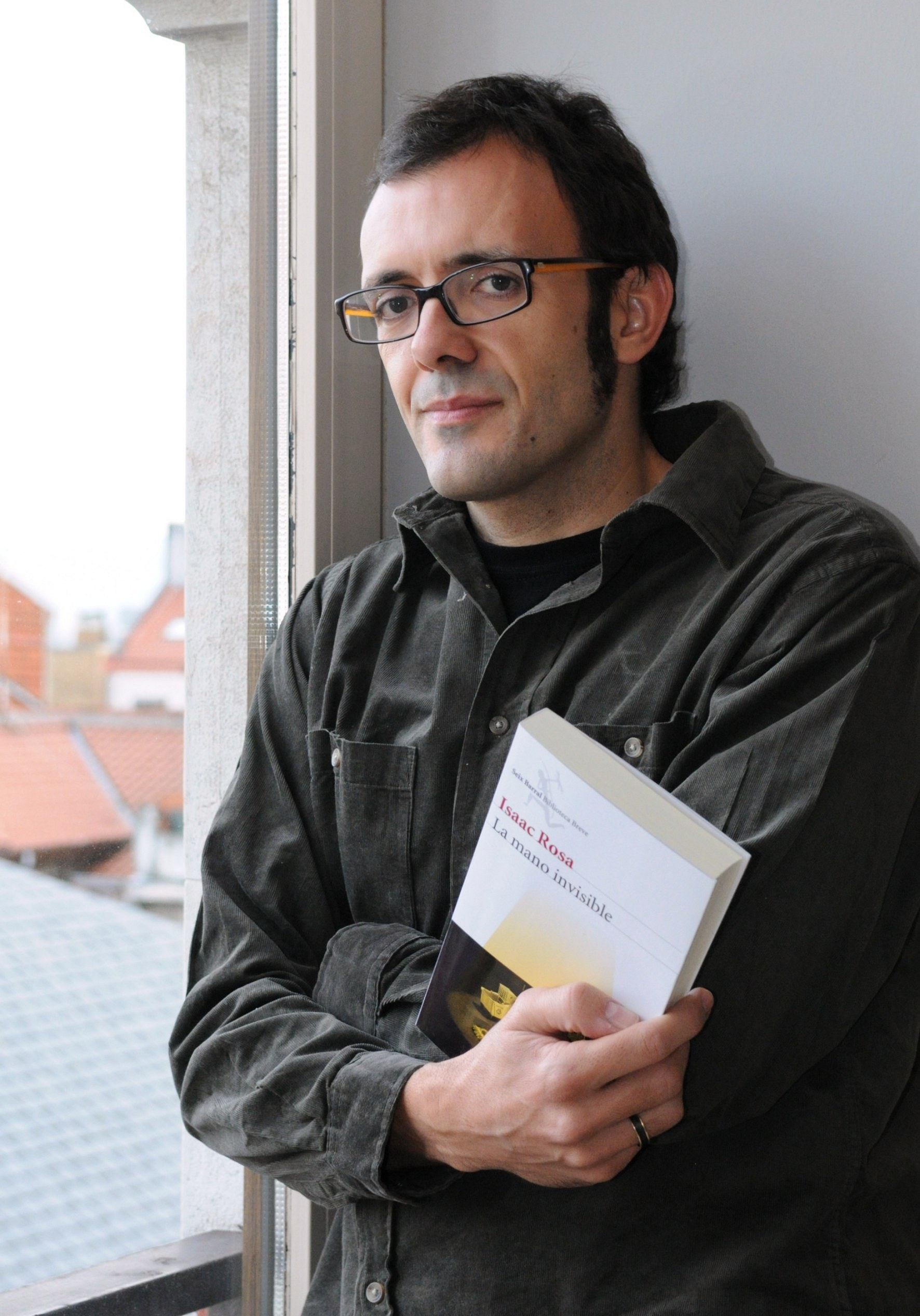
Isaac Rosa Camacho

Isaac Rosa Camacho (born Seville, 1974) is a Spanish writer. He is best known for his novel El vano ayer which won the Premio Rómulo Gallegos in 2005. Rosa is the third Spanish writer to receive this award. Other noted works include El país del miedo and La habitación oscura.

== Publications ==
- 1999: El ruido del mundo [Extremadura 1936]. El gabinete de moscas de la mierda (1999) written by Isaac Rosa and José Israel García Vázquez
- 1999: La malamemoria
- 2004: El vano ayer
- 2007: ¡Otra maldita novela sobre la guerra civil!, novel. Editorial Seix Barral.
- 2008: El país del miedo, novel. Editorial Seix Barral.
- 2011: La mano invisible, novel. Editorial Seix Barral.
- 2013: La habitación oscura, novel. Editorial Seix Barral.
- 2018: Feliz final
- 2022: Lugar seguro, novel, Editorial Seix Barral.
