= PlayStation Move =

Motion game controller by Sony Interactive Entertainment

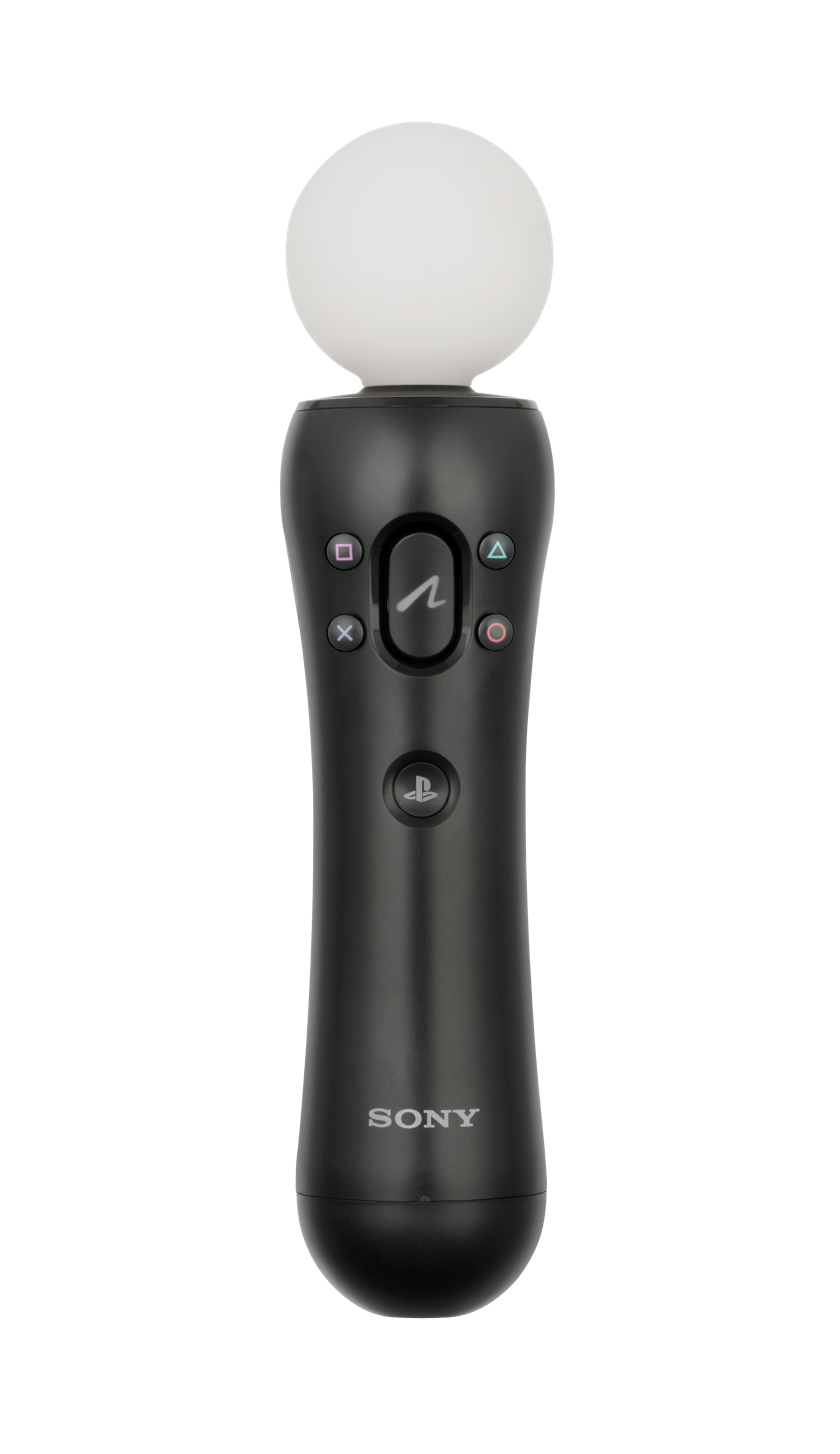
- A PlayStation Move motion controller
- Manufacturer: Sony Interactive Entertainment
- Type: Motion controller
- Generation: Seventh, eighth, and ninth
- Released: September 15, 2010
- Units shipped: 15 million (as of November 11, 2012)
- Input: Motion controller: Motion sensing (three-axis accelerometer, three-axis angular rate sensor); Location tracking (magnetometer, object recognition (via PlayStation Eye or PlayStation Camera)); 1 Analog trigger (T); 8 buttons (Start, Select, Home, Move); Navigation controller: Analog stick; D-pad; 1 Analog trigger (L2); 5 buttons (L1, Home, L3)
- Connectivity: Bluetooth, USB
- Power: Lithium-ion battery

PlayStation Move (プレイステーションムーヴ, PureiSutēshon Mūvu) is a motion game controller developed by Sony Interactive Entertainment. Initially released in 2010 for use with the PlayStation 3 home video game console, its compatibility was later expanded to its successor, the PlayStation 4, its PlayStation VR platform and the PlayStation 5. A revised model of the controller (with a microUSB terminal) is not backwards-compatible with PS3.

Conceptually similar to Nintendo's Wii Remote, its function is based around controller input in games stemming from the actual physical movement of the player. The Move uses inertial sensors in the wand to detect motion while the wand's position is tracked using a PlayStation Eye or PlayStation Camera. The device was generally well received by critics, but has not quite met Sony's goals for integration into the market.

== Hardware ==
As with the standard PlayStation 3 wireless controllers (Sixaxis, DualShock 3), both the main PlayStation Move motion controller and the PlayStation Move navigation controller use Bluetooth 2.0 and an internal lithium-ion battery charged via a USB Mini-B port on the controller. On the PlayStation 3, up to four Move controllers can be used at once (four Move motion controllers, or two Move motion controllers and two Move navigation controllers).

=== Motion controller ===
The primary component of PlayStation Move, the PlayStation Move motion controller, is a wand controller which allows the user to interact with the console through motion and position in front of a PlayStation camera. It functions similarly to the Wii Remote.

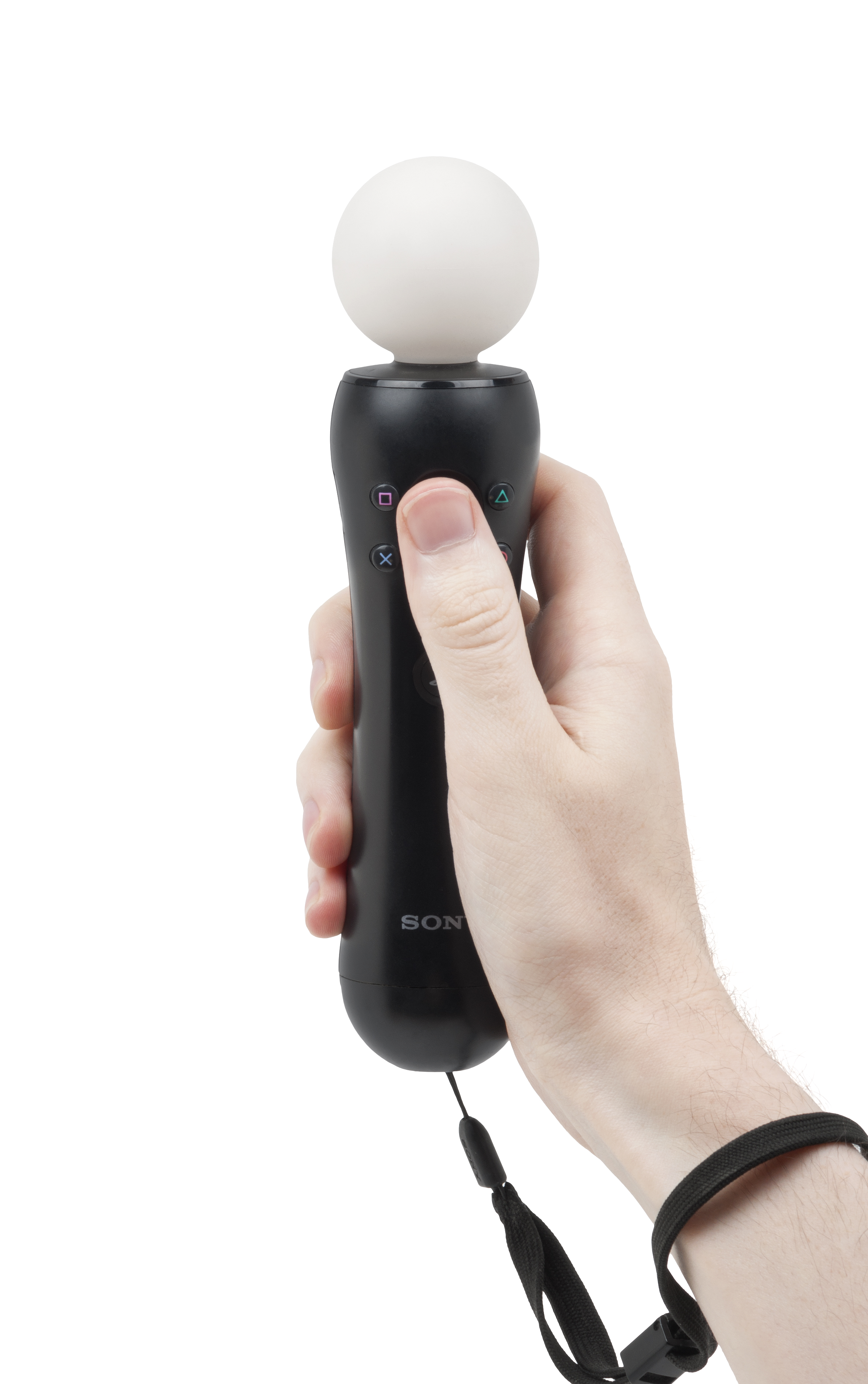
The PlayStation Move features a variety of internal sensors to gauge orientation.

The PlayStation Move motion controller features an orb at the head which can glow in any of a full range of colors using RGB light-emitting diodes (LEDs). Based on the colors in the user environment captured by the camera, the system dynamically selects an orb color that can be distinguished from the rest of the scene. The colored light serves as an active marker, the position of which can be tracked along the image plane by the camera. The uniform spherical shape and known size of the light also allows the system to simply determine the controller's distance from the camera through the light's image size, thus enabling the controller's position to be tracked in three dimensions with high precision and accuracy. (Note: According to the Move motion controller's designers, the sphere's position along the camera's image plane can be resolved at a "really sub-pixel level", translating to a spatial XY-axis precision to the nearest millimeter. The motion controller's distance from the camera (Z-axis) can be resolved with a precision of a few centimeters.) The simple sphere-based distance calculation allows the controller to operate with minimal processing latency, as opposed to other camera-based control techniques on the PlayStation 3. (Note: According to SCEE senior designer for PlayStation Move software Mark D. Green, the response time for the motion control system is 22 milliseconds.)

A pair of inertial sensors inside the controller, a three-axis linear accelerometer and a three-axis angular rate sensor, are used to track rotation as well as overall motion. An internal magnetometer is also used for calibrating the controller's orientation against the Earth's magnetic field to help correct against cumulative error (drift) by the inertial sensors. In addition, an internal temperature sensor is used to adjust the inertial sensor readings against temperature effects. The inertial sensors can be used for dead reckoning in cases which the camera tracking is insufficient, such as when the controller is obscured behind the player's back.

The controller face features a large oblong primary button (Move), surrounded by small action buttons, and with a regular-sized PS button beneath, arranged in a similar configuration as on the Blu-ray Disc Remote Control. On the left and right side of the controller is a Select and Start button, respectively. On the underside is an analog trigger (T). On the tail end of the controller is the wrist strap, USB port, and extension port.

The motion controller features vibration-based haptic technology. In addition to providing a tracking reference, the controller's orb light can be used to provide visual feedback, simulating aesthetic effects such as the muzzle flash of a gun or the paint on a brush.

Using different orb colors for each controller, up to four motion controllers can be tracked at once on the PlayStation 3. Demonstrations for the controller have featured activities using a single motion controller, as well as those in which the user wields two motion controllers, with one in each hand. To minimize the cost of entry, Sony stated that all launch titles for PlayStation Move would be playable with one motion controller, with enhanced options available for multiple motion controllers.

On the PlayStation 3, image processing for PlayStation Move is performed in the console's Cell microprocessor. According to Sony, use of the motion-tracking library entails some Synergistic Processing Unit (SPU) overhead as well an impact on memory, though the company states that the effects will be minimized. According to Move motion controller co-designer Anton Mikhailov, the library uses 1-2 megabytes of system memory.

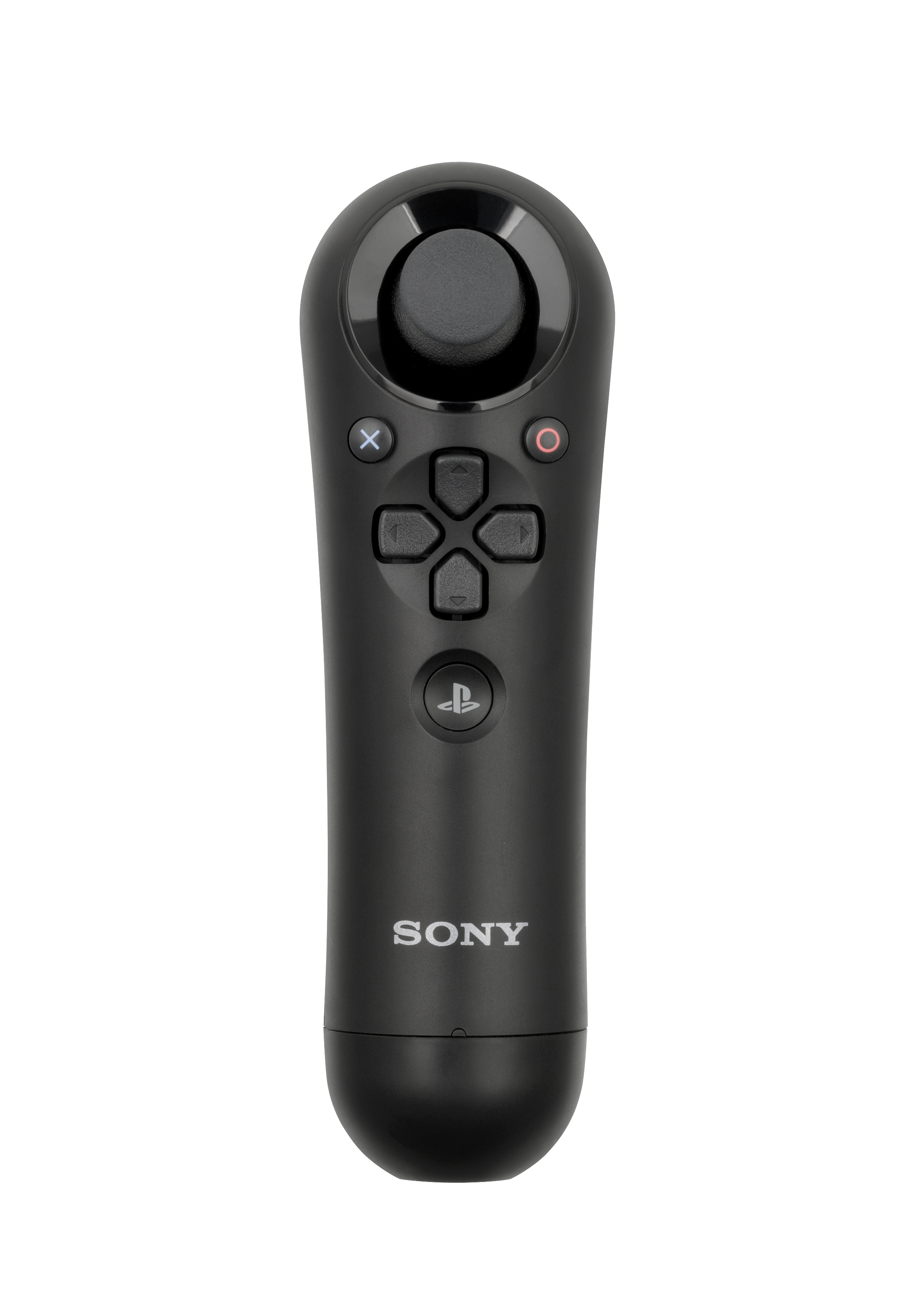
PlayStation Move navigation controller

=== Navigation controller ===
The PlayStation Move navigation controller is a one-handed supplementary controller designed for use in conjunction with the PlayStation Move motion controller for certain types of gameplay, similar to the Nintendo Wii Nunchuk, although it lacks motion-sensing technology, as dual-wield, independent two-handed motion control is implemented with the use of another Move Controller. Replicating the major functionality of the left side of a standard PlayStation 3 gamepad, the PlayStation Move navigation controller features a left analog stick (with L3 button function), a D-pad, L1 button and L2 analog trigger. The navigation controller also features and action buttons, as well as a PS button. Since all controls correspond to those of a standard PlayStation 3 gamepad, a Sixaxis or DualShock 3 controller can be used in place of the navigation controller in PlayStation Move applications.

=== Accessories ===
PlayStation Move Shooting Attachment with a Move Controller attached

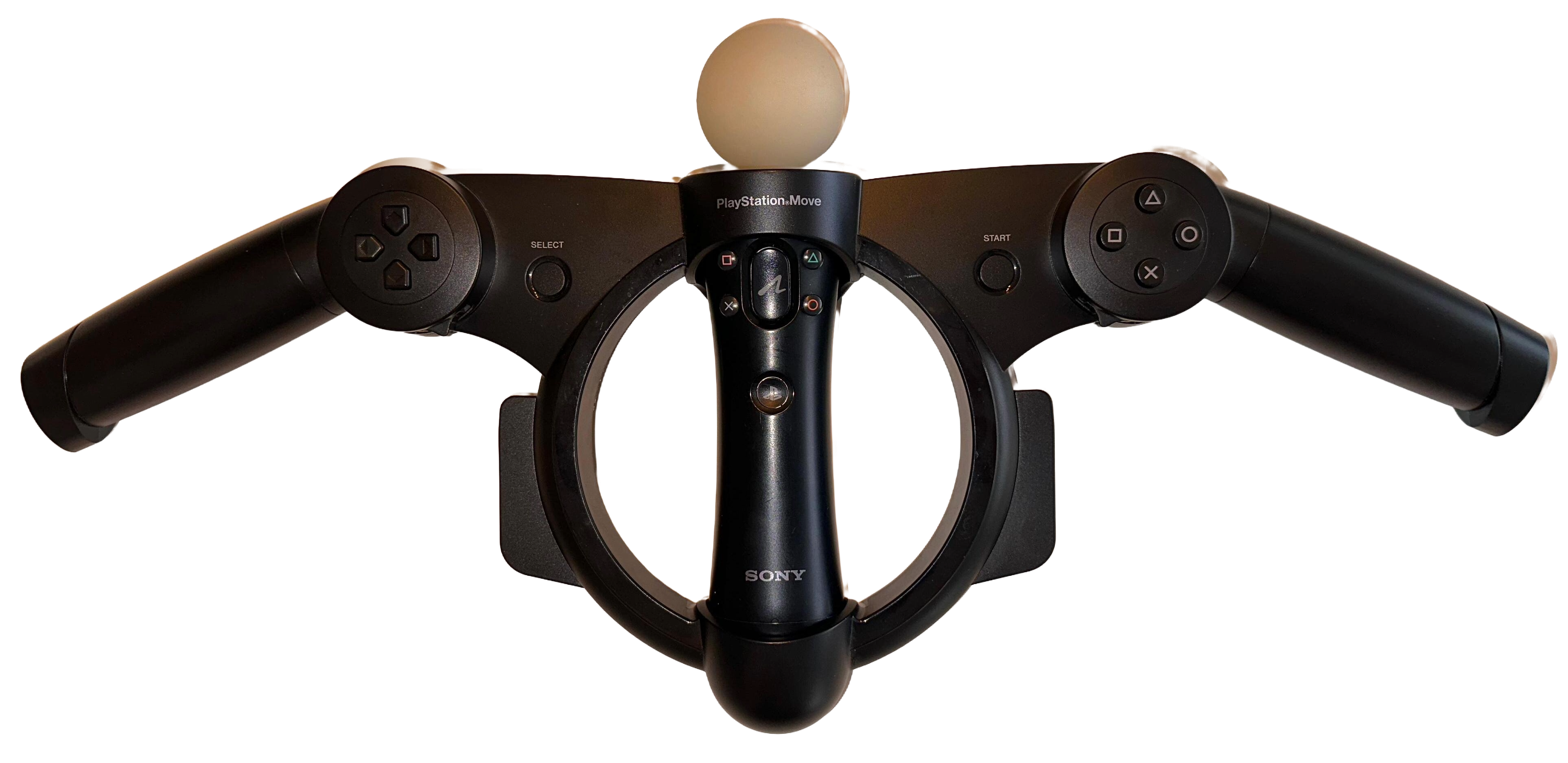
PlayStation Move Racing Wheel with Motion Controller attached

A number of additional accessories have also been released for use in conjunction with the PlayStation Move controllers.

- PlayStation Move charging station could charge up any combination of two Move controllers.
- PlayStation Move Shooting Attachment adapts the Move controllers into a handgun form. The motion controller is fitted into the gun barrel so that the motion controller's T trigger is interlocked with the trigger on the gun attachment, while leaving all the topmost buttons accessible through an opening in the top. Its functions are similar to the Wii Zapper. The model number is CECH-ZGA1E.
- PlayStation Move Sharp Shooter attachment adapts both Move controllers into an assault rifle form, which features an adjustable stock. The motion controller is fitted into the gun barrel, connecting via the proprietary expansion port, while the navigation controller is clipped into a holder below this gun barrel. This accessory also adds several buttons to the controller. Several games, including Killzone 3, Dead Space: Extraction, SOCOM 4: U.S. Navy SEALs and Resistance 3, officially support this peripheral. It include three unique inputs, the reload button, the pump action, and the firing mode selector. Its model number is CECHYA-ZRA1E.
- The PlayStation Move Racing Wheel allows players to simulate driving in video games. The accessory features vibration feedback, paddle-style gear shifters and twist throttle control on the right handle. It can be used in an open mode, resembling motorcycle handlebars, or closed, more akin to a car steering wheel. The Motion Controller attaches on the middle, through its expansion port. Its model number is CECHYA-ZWA1. It supports games like LittleBigPlanet Karting, Gran Turismo 5, Need for Speed: Hot Pursuit, Burnout Paradise, MotorStorm: Apocalypse Need for Speed: Most Wanted, and Dirt 3. Games that are not designed to be used with a PlayStation Move controller also work, such as F1 2013, F1 2014, MotorStorm: Pacific Rift and OutRun Online Arcade, because it is recognized as a standard DualShock 3 controller and maps the tilting of the wheel to the left analog movement, even without using the camera as a tracker.

== Bundle packages ==
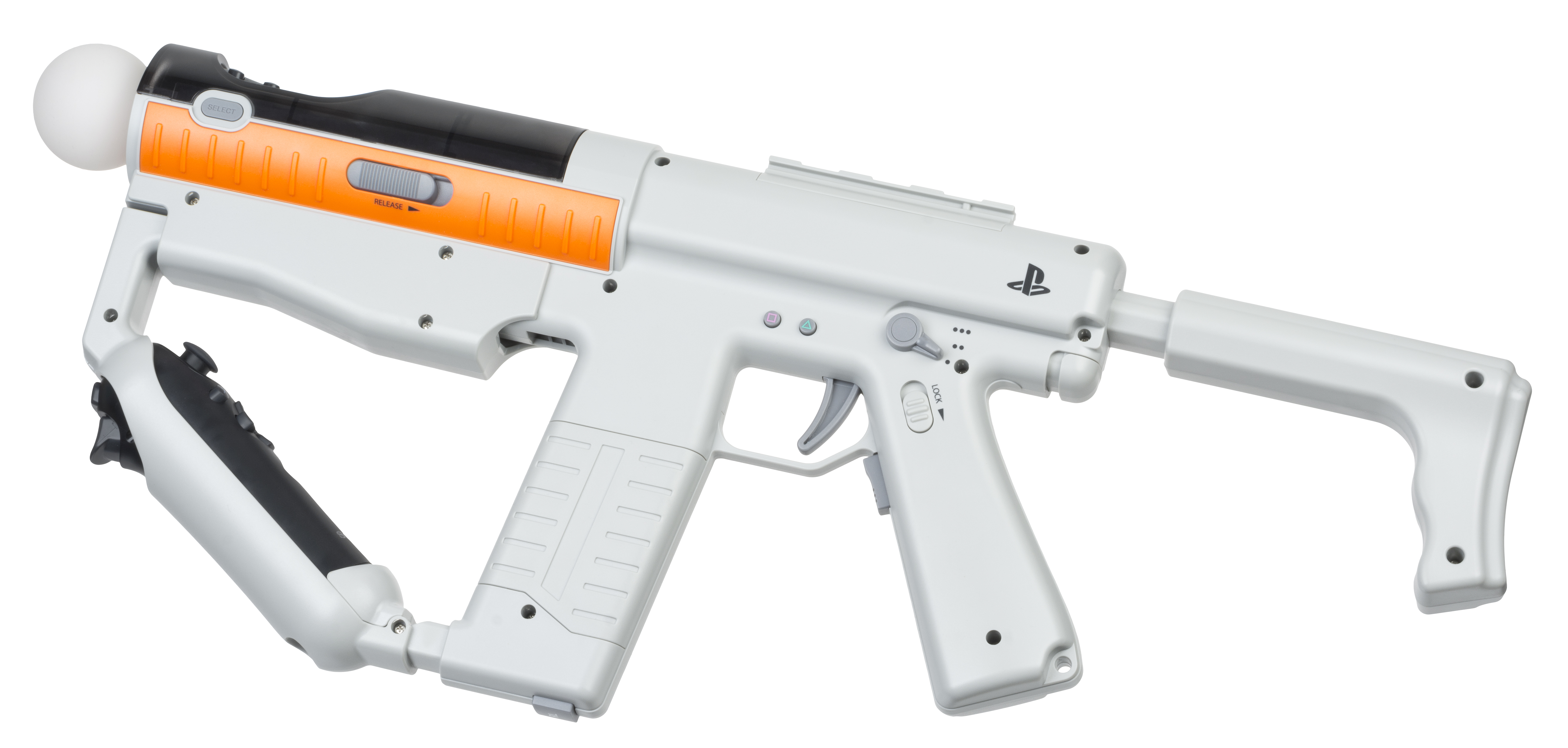
The PS Move Sharp Shooter, a controller holder shaped like an assault rifle that was commonly sold in a bundle with PS Move controllers, PS Eye and the games Killzone 3 and Resistance 3

In addition to selling the controllers individually, Sony also provides several different bundle options for PlayStation Move hardware such as: software/camera bundles with a PlayStation Eye, a Move motion controller and motion-control enabled software; console bundles which include a PS3 console, DualShock 3 controller, PlayStation Eye, and Move motion controller; and bundles with a Move motion controller with select games.

Though the games with the bundles vary in each region, most bundles come with the PlayStation Move Demo Disc which contains demos for eleven different games. The bundles in Europe and Oceania however, come with the PlayStation Move Starter Disc with a setup tutorial and nine demos (same as the Demo Disc, except without Kung Fu Rider and Time Crisis). The demos included are for the games Beat Sketcher, Echochrome II, EyePet, Kung Fu Rider, Sports Champions, Start the Party!, The Shoot, Tiger Woods PGA Tour 11, Time Crisis: Razing Storm, Tumble, and TV Superstars.

In North America, bundles are available with the game Sports Champions or the PlayStation Move edition of EyePet. In Japan, bundles with Beat Sketch!, Biohazard 5 Alternative Edition, or Big 3 Gun Shooting are available. All bundles, as well as the stand-alone controller will also include the demo disk for a limited time. In Europe, a bundle will be released with a demo disc. In Asian countries outside Japan such as Singapore, the bundles are available with the games Sports Champions, Start the Party!, and Kung Fu Rider.

== History ==
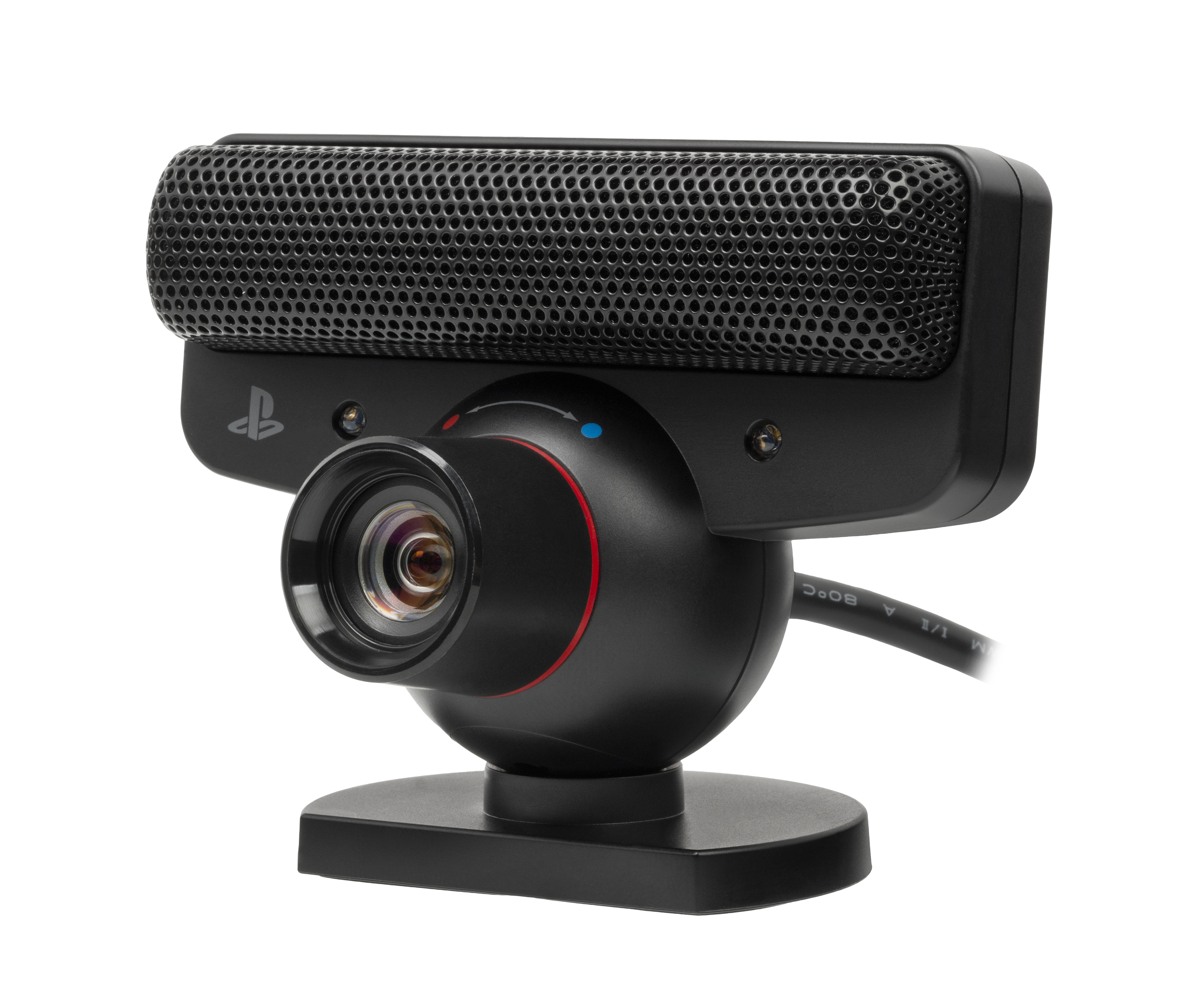
The PlayStation Eye is used in conjunction with the Move to track movement.

PlayStation Move stems from early work on the EyeToy, a webcam-based controller for the PlayStation 2 conceived in 1999 and released in 2003. Early in the EyeToy's inception, developers experimented with color-based 3D wand tracking, including prototypes using spheres. (Note: The colored-sphere based 3D wand tracking technology was publicly demonstrated as early as 2000 and 2001.) By the time it was released, the EyeToy's focus was on hands-free applications. With the emergence of affordable inertial sensors and the success of the Wii Remote motion controller wand, in 2008 Sony began work on productizing its own motion controller wand, revisiting the sphere-tracking concept for use with the PlayStation Eye, integrating inertial sensors, and refining the device from an engineering and a design perspective. The Move's internal development codename was the "Y-con", so called because three groups — the hardware team in SCEI in Japan, the software engineering team at SCEA, and Sony's Worldwide Studios — worked together to develop the hardware, with the three points of a "Y" indicating the three teams coming together. This was the start of a new form of development at Sony, where hardware had previously been developed separately from software teams and later delivered along with technical documentation for software teams to get to grips with themselves; this move was continued with the development of the PlayStation Vita and PlayStation 4.

The motion controller was revealed at Sony's E3 2009 press conference on 2 June 2009, with a live demonstration using an engineering prototype. Tentatively referred to as the PlayStation Motion Controller, the device was originally stated to be available in Q1/Q2 2010. As of August 2009, the controller features and design had not been finalized.

Soon after revealing the motion controller to developers, Sony indicated that it was exploring the possibility of using the motion controller in combination with a standard PlayStation 3 gamepad, such as having the player use "the motion controller as a sword and use DualShock 3 as a shield." (Note: The Wireless Controller for PlayStation 3 has some inertial sensing capabilities through the standard Sixaxis feature. Sony had also submitted several patent applications describing techniques in which the port indicator lights of a Wireless Controller could be used as markers for tracking the controller's position and orientation with the PlayStation Eye.) One combination control scheme was demonstrated in September 2009 at the Tokyo Game Show for Biohazard 5: Alternative Edition, making particular use of the DualShock 3's analog stick. Although users found the setup to work well, some found holding a DualShock with one hand to be somewhat awkward. At the time Sony was already rumored to be in the design phase of a supplementary controller akin to that of the Nunchuk controller for the Wii Remote.

In January 2010, Sony announced a revised release target, stating instead that the motion controller would launch in Q3/Q4 of 2010. On March 10, Sony revealed the official name and logo at the Game Developers Conference, showcasing the final motion controller design, and unveiling the PlayStation Move navigation controller (then referred to as the PlayStation Move sub-controller), to be launched concurrently with the motion controller. The logo is a colored squiggle-like shape, representing a light trail from the sphere of a PlayStation Move motion controller being waved.

=== Name ===
Prior to the Game Developers Conference 2010, the PlayStation Move motion controller was known by several names. Initially given little guidance on what to call the device when it was unveiled in June 2009, many in the video game press informally referred to the controller as the "magic wand", or simply "Wand" due to the controller's wand design and glowing orb. Sony had used the term "PlayStation Motion Controller" from the motion controller's introduction, but many perceived it to be used merely as a description. Sony gradually clarified "Motion Controller" as the tentative name, but by this time media attention had shifted to rumored final names. In September 2009, statements in two unconnected interviews at the Tokyo Game Show led to speculation that the controller may be referred to by developers as the "Sphere". In December, a brief reference to the motion controller as "Gem" by Electronic Arts CEO John Riccitiello during a media industry conference presentation prompted an admission by Sony that "Gem" was an early code name for the controller.

In January 2010, video game blog VG247 reported that Sony had named its PS3 motion control platform "Arc". The name was observed to liken the controller's glowing orb to the charged sphere of a Tesla coil or a plasma globe electrode. The report was supported by evidence emerging in the following weeks, including a registration of the playstationarc.com domain name to SCE dated October 2009 (shortly after the Tokyo Game Show) and numerous references to "Arc" by president Brian Farrell of video game publisher THQ during the company's February earnings conference call. Responding to speculation that Farrell's statements effectively confirmed the name, SCEA senior director of corporate communications Patrick Seybold stated that they did not, and that Farrell was referring to "Arc" as a "rumored code name".

On March 1, it was reported that Sony submitted Japanese trademark application filing for "PlayStation Arc". A week later on March 8, Sony was reportedly considering a hasty renaming due to a trademark held by competitor Microsoft for its Arc-brand PC accessories, which could present trademark conflicts. On March 9, Sony submitted a European trademark filing for "PlayStation Move", which was announced as the official name the next day at Sony's press conference at the Game Developers Conference. Video gaming blog Joystiq reports several anonymous Sony sources claiming that the PlayStation Move logo presented at the conference resembles a letter "A" because it is the same design for when the name was "PlayStation Arc", in which the "A" would stand for "Arc".

=== Promotion and release ===
As part of the promotional marketing for Sorcery, the PlayStation Move controller was inducted into The Magic Circle museum by Vice President Scott Penrose.

PlayStation Move was released in various worldwide territories beginning September 15, 2010, including Europe, Australia and North America. In Japan it was released on October 21, 2010.

=== Hardware revision for PlayStation 4 ===
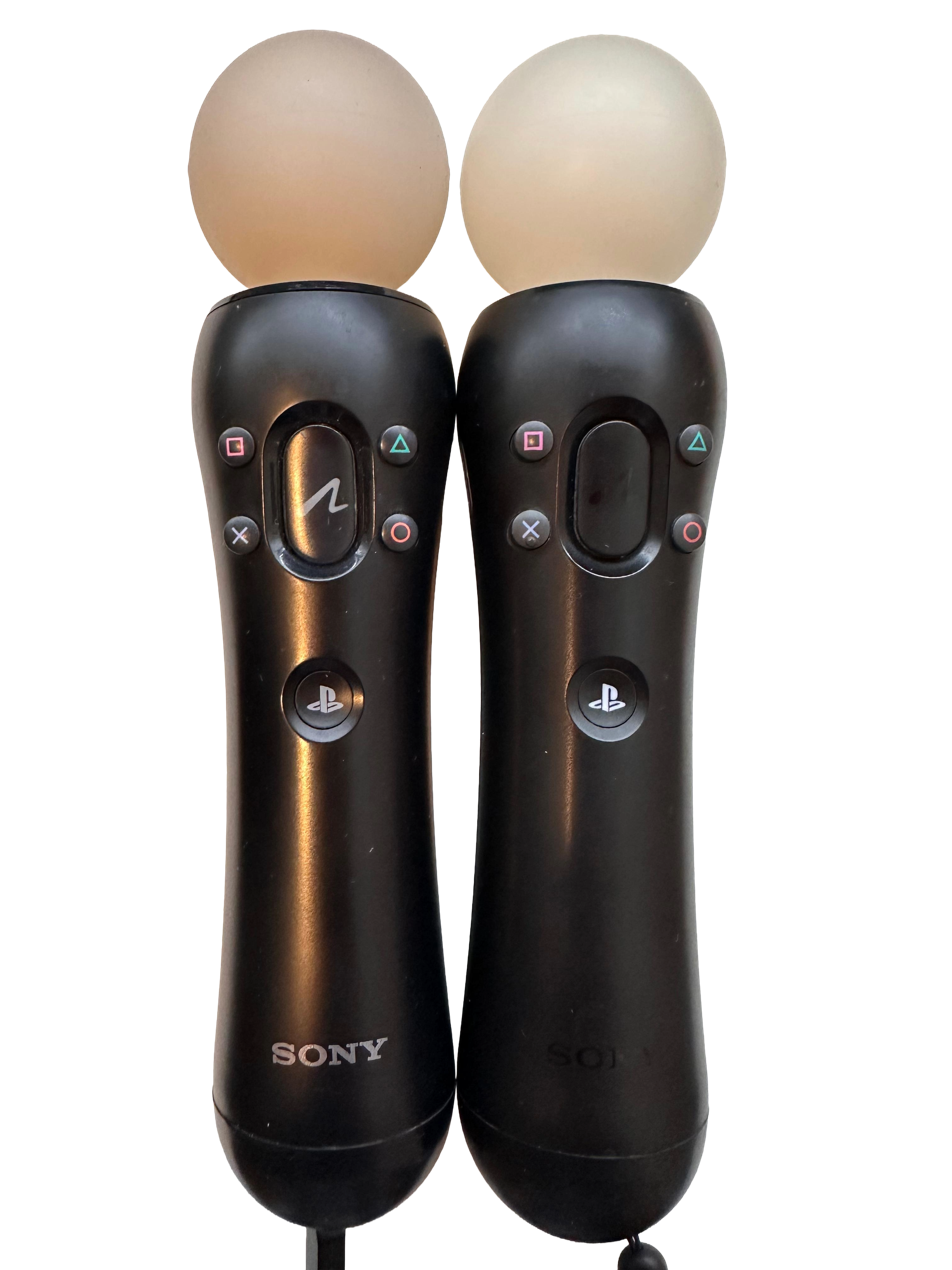
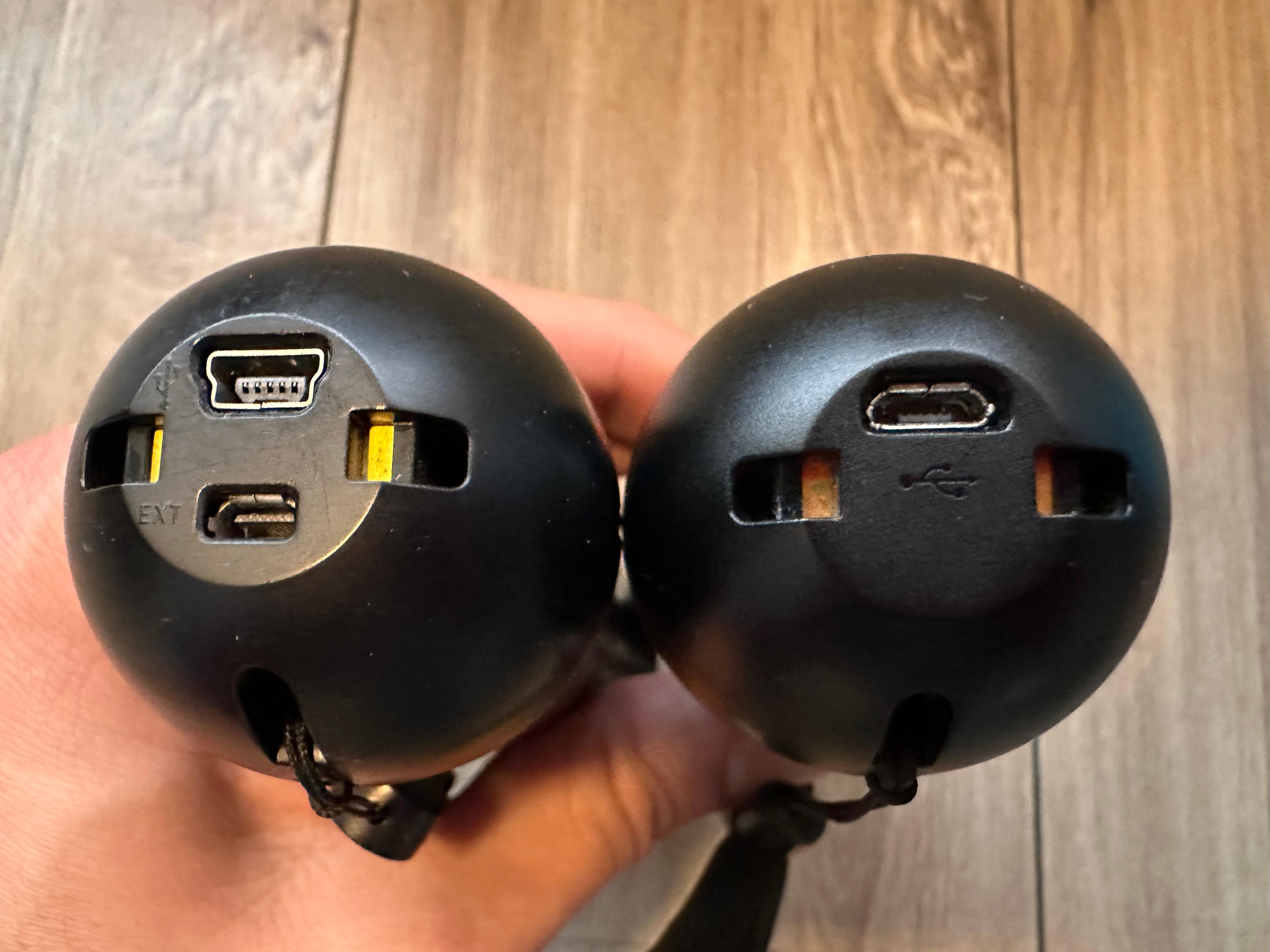
The two revisions, PS3 on the left, PS4 on the right. The older features a Mini USB connector, while the newer uses Micro USB.

The original controller had a Mini USB connection and was compatible with PlayStation 3, PlayStation 4 and PlayStation 5. (Note: Notice that the PS3 Move controller is compatible with PlayStation 4 and PlayStation 5, but the PS3 camera PlayStation Eye is not compatible with the following generations; it requires the usage of PS4's Playstation Camera. The PS5 camera (Playstation HD Camera) is also not compatible with PS Move controllers, thus requiring the usage of PS4 camera in order for it to work on the PS5.) In 2017, Sony launched a hardware revision (model code CECH-ZCM2), with a Micro USB connector and a bigger battery (1900 mAh, up from 1350), intended to be used with PlayStation VR. This second version is not compatible with PS3. It also removed the extension connector in the bottom, thus being incompatible with accessories such as the PlayStation Move Sharp Shooter attachment and the PlayStation Move Racing Wheel. There are smaller cosmetic differences: the PS4 revision changed the Sony logo color from gray to black, added OPTIONS legend to the START button and SHARE legend to the SELECT button.

== Software ==
Alongside SIE Worldwide Studios and its second-party partners, a total of 36 third-party game development companies had confirmed that they would support the PlayStation Move by the time the finalized controller was announced in March 2010. On the box art of PlayStation Move games, underneath the PlayStation 3 logo banner, a blue bar with white letters indicates when a game supports the PlayStation Move. When a game can only be played with the PlayStation Move, the box art carries a "PlayStation Move Required" label. When a game supports traditional Sixaxis/DualShock 3 controls and PlayStation Move controls it carries a "PlayStation Move Features" (or "PlayStation Move Compatible") label.

== Reception ==
=== Critical reception ===
The PlayStation Move has been generally well received. Game Informer gave it an 8 out of 10, saying, "The PlayStation Eye and motion controller are a killer combination for accurate and highly responsive motion-based gameplay, and we applaud Sony for getting the hardware right the first time." Kotaku praised its accuracy, design, use of augmented reality and said, "The Playstation Move is a intuitive, natural feeling way to play games and it brings with it not only a sense of increased immersion to already graphically immersive games, but a new way to play with your reality and a refreshing form of colorful feedback." IGN gave the Move an 8.5 out of 10, noting that the launch line-up of games for the controller was insufficient though it summarized by saying, "At the end of the day, the PlayStation Move has the potential to be the best motion control system on the current crop of consoles." Joystiq praised the Move, saying, "The hardware's great, and I can see it being used in a multitude of really cool ways, but of course it's only as cool as the games that use it" and that the launch line-up was not worth the purchase, though it believed that the Move would be worth the purchase in early 2011 due to a stronger line-up of games such as SOCOM 4: U.S. Navy SEALs and Killzone 3. CVG gave the Move an extremely positive review and awarded it 9 out of 10, saying, "Sony's motion control gets beyond being a gimmick. We found ourselves constantly itching for 'one more go'." The Guardian strongly criticized the Move's launch line-up, though it noted that the hardware was strong and that after playing with the Move it was "very hard to go back to the relative inaccuracy of the Wii".

The PlayStation Move won the 2010 Popular Science award for the "Most immersive game controller".

=== Sales ===
In October 2010, the PlayStation Move had shipped around 1.5 million units in Europe and 1 million units in North America during its first month of release, figures that Sony felt were selling "extremely well" at the time. On 30 November 2010, it was announced that 4.1 million units had been shipped worldwide in the first two months since its release. By June 2011, at E3 2011, Sony announced that the PlayStation Move had sold 8.8 million units. By November 2012, this figure had grown to 15 million.

In March 2012 Fergal Gara of Sony UK spoke to Official PlayStation Magazine UK to acknowledge that, the device had not lived up to their expectations, in either their target audience or the software support that had been provided for it.

=== Use in recreational therapy ===
PlayStation Move has been used in recreational therapy on children that suffer from obesity. The Move creates a challenging physical environment for the children. In one study, recreational therapists utilized PlayStation Move Fitness. The children chose which activity to do and then, they engaged for a period of approximately 30 minutes. The recreational therapists monitored the children. These programs have shown to:

- Lower BMI and weight.
- Improve cardiovascular endurance.
- Lead to healthier choices in recreation activities.
- Improve self-esteem.
- Identify the importance of exercise.

== See also ==
- Wonderbook
- Games that are compatible with PlayStation Move
- Games that require PlayStation Move
