= List of zombie video games =

This is an incomplete list of video games strongly featuring zombies. These games feature creatures inspired by the archetypal flesh-eating zombies seen in horror films, B-movies and literature; such as in the films of George A. Romero. Other variants, such as the faster running zombies, are also included. Particular zombie rationale and depictions vary with the source.

Zombies are common or generic enemies in video games. The ZX Spectrum computer game Zombie Zombie, released in Europe in 1984, is considered to be the first video game focused on zombies. Zombie games became more prevalent after the release of the survival horror game Resident Evil in 1996. This release, coupled with the 1996 light-gun shooter The House of the Dead, gave rise to "an international craze" for zombies, in turn impacting zombie films. Resident Evil sold 2.75 million copies within the United States alone, and its success resulted in it becoming a major horror franchise encompassing video games, novelizations, and films. The House of the Dead is also credited with introducing fast running zombies, distinct from Romero's classic slow zombies.

== Games ==
Name	Year	Platform(s)	
7 Days to Die	2013	Linux, macOS, Windows, PlayStation 4	An open-world, voxel-based, role-playing survival RPG set in the aftermath of a third world war. The player controls a survivor trapped in Arizona in the year 2034, where zombies run rampant after an unknown virus infects the remaining surviving population. The player must find food, water, weapons, and other supplies, as well as craft and build up defenses to survive against the relentless horde of the undead.
Alive 4-Ever	2009	iOS	Overhead shooter game where the player picks one of four characters and attempts to stave off a zombie horde whilst completing objectives.
All Zombies Must Die!	2011	PlayStation 3, Windows, Xbox 360	A downloadable top-down view shooter game with role-playing game elements. Up to four players must survive a zombie apocalypse. The sequel to Burn Zombie Burn!.
Alone in the Dark 3	1994	MS-DOS, Mac OS, Windows	Survival horror game set in an Old West ghost town. Paranormal investigator Edward Carnby must rescue Emily Hartwood, the other playable character from Alone in the Dark from a band of zombie outlaws.
Amy	2012	PlayStation 3, Xbox 360	Downloadable survival horror game. A scientist must escort an eight-year-old girl through a city devastated by an airborne virus that turns those infected into zombies. The scientist is infected and must manage her condition.
Apocalypse Max: Better Dead Than Undead	2012	iOS, Android	Side-scrolling platform shooter mobile game where the player operates as the character Max and defeats zombies.
Area 51	1995	Arcade, PlayStation, Saturn, Windows	Light gun game where players fight off an alien infestation inside Area 51 while fighting the personnel, who have been turned into zombies.
Atom Zombie Smasher	2011	Linux, macOS, Windows	Real time strategy game viewed from a top-down perspective where players must coordinate military units in order to rescue civilians from a zombie horde.
Back 4 Blood	2021	Windows, PlayStation, Xbox	First person shooter, survival horror game
Beast Busters	1989	Amiga, Arcade, Atari ST	Light gun game for up to three players, who must shoot their way out of a zombie-infested city with submachine guns.
Blood	1997	MS-DOS	First-person shooter game set in the 1920s. The player plays as an undead henchman on a quest for revenge. Zombies are common enemies the player will face in almost every level.
Blood Drive	2010	PlayStation 3, Xbox 360	Vehicular combat game featuring six arenas filled with zombies, players control drivers who must either defeat zombies or other drivers, dependent on which level is being played.
Burn, Zombie Burn!	2009	PlayStation 3, Windows, macOS,	Zombies appear in waves and must be destroyed by being set alight.
Call of Duty Zombies	2008-present	Various	First introduced in Call of Duty: World at War and primarily featured in the Black Ops sub-series. Call of Duty Zombies is a cooperative gamemode in which 1-4 players fight an unlimited number of waves of zombies. Players gain points by killing the zombies which can be spent to open up blocked passages, earn perks that increase one's combat capabilities, or obtain new armory, including exotic Wonder Weapons. While earlier games feature few additional mechanics intending for the players to eventually be overrun, later games feature elaborate easter eggs, including main quests that advance the storyline.
CarnEvil	1998	Arcade	Light gun game set in an undead-infested amusement park.
Carrier	2000	Dreamcast	Survival horror, an explosion aboard a large ship has released a virus which transforms the infected into mutants similar to the Resident Evil zombies.
Cataclysm: Dark Days Ahead	2013	PC, Mobile	Hardcore rogue-like adventure game set in a post apocalyptic world, featuring a wide variety of zombies as well as Triffids, Fungal Monsters, and otherworldy creatures such as Flaming Eyes. The game features robust systems for character traits, stats, skills, and a very wide variety of items, vehicles, buildings, and map features randomly generated when each word is created. This game is still in development with an open source code.
City of the Dead	Cancelled	PlayStation 2, Windows, Xbox	Based on George Romero's Living Dead series, this first-person shooter was shown at the 2005 Electronic Entertainment Expo but dropped from release schedules when publisher Hip Interactive suffered financial troubles.
Contagion	2014	Windows	Contagion is a zombie survival horror title by Monochrome Games and is the spiritual successor to the Half-Life 2 mod Zombie Panic: Source.
Corpse Craft: Incident at Weardd Academy	2008	Browser, Flash, iOS	A simplified real-time strategy game in which schoolchildren battle each other with zombies they reanimate.
Corpse Killer	1994	3DO, Sega CD, 32X, Saturn, Windows	A live-action light gun game featuring a soldier who must fight through an island full of zombies to reach 'necrobiologist' Dr. Hellman.
D2	2000	Dreamcast	Survival horror, the survivor of a plane crash in the wilds of Canada discovers that other passengers on the plane are being transformed into zombie-plant hybrids.
Darkwatch	2005	PlayStation 2, Xbox	First-person shooter in a Wild West setting. A train robber turned vampire must defeat enemies such as zombies and skeletons while trying to reclaim his humanity.
Days Gone	2019	PlayStation 4, Windows	An open-world action-adventure game where you play as Deacon St. John, a Drifter and bounty hunter who would rather risk the dangers of the broken road than live in one of the "safe" wilderness encampments. The game takes place two years after a global pandemic has killed almost everyone, but transformed millions of others into what survivors call Freakers.
DayZ	2012	Windows	An ARMA 2 mod which features survival horror and shooter gameplay in an open world. The game is online multiplayer. Players must feed their character as well as deal with other players and the living dead. The mod now also has a stand-alone version for PC owners.
Dead Ahead	2016	iOS	Players race through a short series of increasingly difficult levels trying to escape from zombies that increase in speed over time. The goal is to last as long as possible to earn money to buy and upgrade new vehicles and weapons. The player unlocks weapons and vehicles by completing tasks to progress through the ranks.
Dead Ahead: Zombie Warfare	2017	iOS, macOS	The sequel to Dead Ahead, Zombie Warfare features a different play style and a wider variety of zombies than its predecessor. The player travels between multiple locations completing levels in order to continue their journey. The player hires and upgrades units that they deploy during the levels in order to eliminate the zombies and mutated monsters and clear roadblocks. Similar to Dead Ahead, the player collects XP to rank up and unlock new units and locations.
Dead Block	2011	PlayStation 3, Windows, Xbox 360	Players must barricade themselves within a building while exploring to find items in order to complete each level.
Dead Effect series	2013 (first release) and 2015 (second release)	iOS, Android, Windows, macOS, PlayStation 4, Xbox One	The Dead Effect series is a horror, first-person shooter, RPG, zombie game developed and published by BadFly Interactive a.s. The second release features a co-operative Multiplayer and PvP Multi-player. the player has to battle with zombies, soldiers, bosses and cyberdogs to gain points and cash for buying and upgrading weapons, armour, etc. The game contains a story mode and other missions like generic, survival, bio-hazard, etc.
Dead Frontier	2008	Browser	Free browser-based top down massively multiplayer online role-playing game set in an open world. Dead Frontier takes place in a post-apocalypse setting teeming with zombies. Players must scavenge supplies in order to survive.
Dead Head Fred	2007	PlayStation Portable	Private investigator Fred is murdered, only to find himself reanimated and able to steal enemies' heads to perform different attacks.
Dead Island series	2011–present	PlayStation 3, PlayStation 4, Windows, Xbox 360, Xbox One	Single-player or multiplayer open world games with role-playing elements and an emphasis on combat. Upcoming releases include a new game in the main series, a stealth-focused spinoff and a MOBA game.
Dead Nation	2010	PlayStation 3	PlayStation Network twin-stick shooter. The game detects players' geographic locations and groups them accordingly within the game world, displaying players' progress in that region.
Dead Rising series	2006–present	iOS, PlayStation 3, Wii, Windows, Xbox 360, Xbox One	Third-person action games which allow the player to destroy zombies with various ordinary items and weapons, from benches and lawnmowers to guns and swords.
Dead Rush	Cancelled	PlayStation 2, Xbox	A third-person survival horror game featuring driving game elements. Announced at E3 2004 and set to be released in 2005. It was cancelled shortly thereafter.
Dead Space series	2008–2013	PlayStation 3, Wii, Windows, Xbox 360	Science fiction survival horror games where Necromorphs, generated from corpses infected by an alien pathogen, are the primary enemy. They are most effectively killed by "strategic dismemberment", cutting off their limbs.
Dead State	2014	Windows	Role-playing game with turn-based combat set in the fictional town of Splendid, Texas. Players must defend their shelter while foraging for supplies and recruiting survivors.
Deadlight	2012	Windows, Xbox 360	Side-scrolling survival-horror game.
Deep Fear	1998	Saturn	A survival-horror game that takes place in an underwater research facility that becomes overtaken by mutant zombie-like creatures.
Die2Nite	2008	Browser	The players are randomly divided into groups of 40, and each group is allocated within a small town where they must survive as long as possible. Every night at midnight (23:00 game time) the zombies launch an attack on the town.
Doom series	1993–present	MS-DOS, Windows	First-person shooter survival horror game with zombies, demons, monsters and other occultist creatures.
Dying Light	2015	PlayStation 4, Windows, Xbox One	Open World survival horror game set in the fictional quarantined city of Harran, an expansive urban environment overrun by a vicious outbreak. The player is sent to infiltrate the city and must survive by relying on parkour free-running and traps, while scavenging resources and crafting weapons to defend against the growing infected population.
Dying Light 2	2022	PlayStation 5, PlayStation 4, Windows, Xbox One, Xbox Series X/S, Nintendo Switch	Open World survival horror game set in the last bastion of humanity, city of Villedor, an expansive environment overrun by a vicious outbreak. The player is gone to the city searching for his sister. He must survive by relying on parkour free-running and traps, paraglider and hooker, while scavenging resources and crafting weapons to defend against the growing infected population.
Entombed	1982	Atari 2600	From a top-down perspective, the player must make their way through an endless, vertically scrolling maze filled with zombies.
The Evil Dead	1984	Commodore 64, ZX Spectrum	The player, as Ash Williams, must fight the walking dead, reanimated limbs and other monsters while trying to defend a log cabin.
Evil Dead series	2000–2005	Dreamcast, PlayStation, PlayStation 2, Windows, Xbox	Action game trilogy consisting of Hail to the King, A Fistful of Boomstick and Regeneration. Ash Williams fights against Deadites, "zombified demons".
The Evil Within series	2014–2017	PlayStation 3, PlayStation 4, Windows, Xbox 360, Xbox One	A gory survival horror game played from a third person viewpoint. Contains both stealth and action sequences. Zombies must be dispatched and burned to prevent them returning to life.
Flesh Feast	1998	Windows	3D game in which the player must guide either a team of four characters or a single character through 17 stages of play, rescuing survivors and fighting zombies.
Fort Zombie	2009	Windows	Players must barricade themselves within a building and survive a zombie onslaught.
Ghosts and Goblins	1985	Amiga, Arcade, Commodore 64, Commodore 16, NES	is a side-scrolling platforming game developed by Capcom for video arcades and has since been released on several other platforms. It is the first game in the Ghosts 'n Goblins franchise.
Ghoul Patrol	1994	Super NES	Sequel to Zombies Ate My Neighbors. The local library's goblin exhibit has come to life, the ghoul patrol must fight historical figures who have become zombies as well as other monsters.
Gloom 3	1997	Amiga	First-person shooter, the player dispenses with zombies which explode in a shower of limbs.
The Grinder	Unreleased	PlayStation 3, Wii, Xbox 360	The Wii version is an exploitation-themed first-person shooter, the PlayStation and Xbox versions are top-down shooter games. The developer High Voltage Software originally revealed the title in 2009 as a Wii exclusive, later revealing a different version for the other consoles. Since that time the firm has laid off staff, leaving the status of the game's development in question.
H1Z1: Just Survive	2015	Windows	MMO open world survival game set in a post-apocalyptic rural United States infected by the H1Z1 outbreak; an effective and intense mutation of the H1Z1 virus. The player must survive with emphasis on mainly crafting, cooperation, and scavenging resources against the swarming zombie population, vicious animals such as wolves and bears, and potentially hostile survivors.
Half-Life series	1998–2020	Windows, macOS, Several consoles	The player confronts several alien lifeforms that invaded Earth due to a teleport accident. The most prominent foes are humans zombified by some aliens called 'headcrabs'.
Horror Zombies from the Crypt	1990	Amiga, Atari ST, MS-DOS	Platform game where the player enters a mansion full of zombies and other ghastly creatures.
How To Survive	2013	PlayStation 3, Windows, Xbox 360, Wii U	Twin-stick shooter game where the player must maintain their character's survival needs. A crafting system is included.
The House of the Dead series	1996–2013	Arcade, Dreamcast, Saturn, Wii, Windows, Xbox	Gory light gun Arcade games on rails which feature numerous zombies. It is credited with introducing fast running zombies.
Human Element	Pre-release	PlayStation 4, Wii U, Windows, Xbox One	Survival game set 35 years after a zombie apocalypse. Players must try to rebuild civilization.
Hunter: The Reckoning series	2002–2003	GameCube, PlayStation 2, Xbox	Trilogy of action games based on the role-playing game, one or more players are tasked with defeating the undead evil that manifests in the town of Ashcroft.
I Made a Game with Zombies in It!	2009	Xbox 360	Released on Microsoft's Xbox Live Indie Games channel, up to four players shoot droves of attacking enemies, including zombies, while collecting power-ups.
Infected	2005	PlayStation Portable	Fast-paced shooter game set two weeks before Christmas in New York City. Players assume the role of a rookie police officer and must rescue civilians from the marauding undead.
Infestation: Survivor Stories	2012	Windows	A survival horror game similar to DayZ in which the player must survive for as long as possible. A lot of controversy has surrounded this game due to its close resemblance to DayZ.
Into the Dead	2012	iOS, Android, Windows Mobile, Windows	First-person endless runner game.
Into the Dead 2	2017	iOS, Android, Nintendo Switch	Sequel to Into the Dead that follows a similar first-person endless runner format with expanded gameplay and story.
Into the Dead: Our Darkest Days	2025	Windows, macOS	Spin-off of the Into the Dead franchise that is a 2.5D side-scroller survival horror game set in 1980 Texas which has fallen to a zombie outbreak. The player has to scavenge, craft, and survive.
Isle of the Dead	1993	MS-DOS	First-person shooter with adventure game elements, the player is stranded on an island filled with zombies.
Judge Dredd: Dredd Vs. Death	2003	GameCube, PlayStation 2, Windows, Xbox	First-person shooter, Judge Dredd faces numerous zombies, vampires and mutants whilst attempting to stop Judge Death from destroying the world's population.
Killing Floor series	2005	Linux, macOS, Windows	Killing Floor was originally a total conversion mod for the game Unreal Tournament 2004, first released in 2005. Players assume the role of squad members that must stop increasingly powerful waves of zombie-like clone soldiers.
Land of the Dead: Road to Fiddler's Green	2005	Windows, Xbox	First-person shooter set within the same universe as the George Romero film Land of the Dead. Players control Jack, a farmer who must fight through different environments in order to find safety within the City of the Living.
The Last Guy	2008	PlayStation 3	An overhead-perspective rescue game in which the player character is a humanity-loving zombie who must guide civilians to escape points in monster-infested cities.
The Last of Us	2013	PlayStation 3	An action-adventure survival horror video game. Played from a third-person perspective; players use firearms and improvised weapons, and can use stealth to defend against hostile humans and cannibalistic creatures. Considered to be one of the greatest video games of all time, it won year-end accolades, including multiple Game of the Year awards from several gaming publications, critics, and game award shows, making it one of the most awarded games in history.
The Last of Us Part II	2020	PlayStation 4	Sequel to The Last of Us, an action-adventure survival horror video game. Played from a third-person perspective; players use firearms and improvised weapons, and can use stealth to defend against hostile humans and cannibalistic creatures.
Left 4 Dead series	2008–2009	macOS, Windows, Xbox 360	Multiplayer first-person shooter games in which four survivors must cooperate to survive against the hordes of the infected and mutated monsters in an apocalyptic pandemic.
Little Red Riding Hood's Zombie BBQ	2008	Nintendo DS	A surreal game where an outbreak of zombies infects many classic fairy tale settings, leaving only Little Red Riding Hood and Momotarō to defend themselves from the invasion.
Lollipop Chainsaw	2012	PlayStation 3, Xbox 360	An action game which stars a chainsaw-wielding cheerleader who must rid her high school of zombies.
Martian Gothic: Unification	2000	PlayStation, Windows	A science fiction survival horror. A trio of astronauts must combat zombies while solving puzzles and piecing together what happened to a research colony on Mars.
MediEvil series	1998–2007	PlayStation, PlayStation 3, PlayStation Portable, PlayStation 4 (remake)	The series stars Sir Dan, a cowardly knight slain by a wizard's army. 100 years later the same wizard casts a spell to raise an army of undead, raising Sir Dan in the process.
Minecraft	2009	Windows, macOS, Linux, Android, iOS, Amazon Fire, Xbox One, Nintendo Switch, iPadOS, PlayStation 4, ChromeOS, PlayStation 5, Xbox Series S/X, Nintendo Switch 2	A survival sandbox game where the player needs to survive by building a shelter, and building tools to keep zombies and other monsters away.
Monkey Island 2: LeChuck's Revenge	1991	Amiga, MS-DOS, FM Towns, Mac OS	Graphic adventure game. The series' antagonist, LeChuck the pirate, is reanimated as a zombie.
Night Slashers	1993	Arcade	
Nightmare Creatures	1997–1998	PlayStation, Windows, Nintendo 64	A survival horror game based in the nineteenth century. A devil-worshipping cult called 'The brotherhood of the Hecate' perform ungodly experiments in London to try to create super-humans but instead makes horrid monsters. It contains a wide array of creatures including zombies.
No More Room in Hell	2011–present	Windows, Linux, macOS, SteamOS	A multiplayer-focused survival game, initially created as a Source Engine mod. The game mainly focuses on co-operation and survival rather than dispatching zombies. Heavily inspired by George A. Romero's Living Dead series, the zombies are mainly slow-moving and are dangerous in large formed groups, though freshly turned cadavers as well as reanimated children move faster due to the lack of rigor mortis.
The OneChanbara series	2000–present	PlayStation 2, PlayStation 3, PlayStation 4, PlayStation Portable, Wii, Xbox 360	Hack and slash games involving a bikini-clad female protagonist cutting swathes through an army of undead with a katana.
Pathways Into Darkness	1993	Macintosh	One of Bungie's first games, it involved a special forces soldier being dispatched to a Central American temple where he could speak with the bodies of dead Nazis and explorers and fight various supernatural, undead and alien enemies.
Pixel Force: Left 4 Dead	2010	Windows	A fan remake of Left 4 Dead. Unlike the source game, a first-person shooter, this game is an overhead shooter.
Plague Inc.	2012	iOS, Android, Windows Phone, Windows	A real-time strategy simulation game in which the player can evolve different pathogens in order to extinct the human race. Players have the option to play as a zombie plague called the Necroa Virus. Once zombified, humans cannot be cured, so an anti-zombie force called Z-Com becomes the biggest enemy for the player.
Plants vs. Zombies	2009	macOS, Windows, Xbox 360, iOS, PlayStation 3	Tower defence game featuring a homeowner defending their home against zombies, which must be defeated by an assortment of plants with different offensive abilities.
Plants vs. Zombies: Garden Warfare	2014	Windows, PlayStation 4, PlayStation 3, Xbox One, Xbox 360	A third person shooter game based on the original Plants vs. Zombies game. It features several new game modes.
Plants vs. Zombies: Garden Warfare 2	2016 release	Windows, PlayStation 4, Xbox One	A sequel to the 2014 game.
Possession	Unreleased	PlayStation 3, Windows, Xbox 360	The Enslaver, a traveller who was turned into a zombie through experimentation, seeks revenge by converting humans into zombies and commanding them to attack the living.
Postal 2: Apocalypse Weekend	2005	Linux, macOS, Windows	Expansion pack for first-person shooter game Postal 2 featuring a zombie attack on the fictitious town of Paradise.
Pro Zombie Soccer	2010	iOS, Android	Touch-controlled mobile game where players must quickly defeat hordes of zombies, using soccer balls, before the protagonist Jax succumbs to the effects of the zombie infection.
Project Zomboid	Pre-release	Linux, macOS, Windows	An isometric zombie survival role-playing game under ongoing development.
Realm of Impossibility	1984	Apple IIe, Atari 8-bit, Commodore 64, ZX Spectrum	An isometric action adventure game with 13 levels. Zombies, spiders and snakes must be avoided in order to reclaim the crowns stolen by an evil cleric.
Red Dead Redemption: Undead Nightmare	2010	PlayStation 3, Xbox 360	Downloadable content for the open-world wild west game Red Dead Redemption. Players try to find a cure for the plague which is turning locals into zombies.
Resident Evil series	1996–present	Various	Survival horror series featuring flesh-eating zombies created by synthetic means, such as infection with the fictional T-virus.
Return to Castle Wolfenstein	2001	Linux, macOS, PlayStation 2, Windows, Xbox	First-person shooter from the Wolfenstein series, players fight Nazi soldiers and numerous zombies. The object of the game is to prevent the raising of an army of undead Nazis.
Rise of Nightmares	2011	Xbox 360	The game uses full-body control via the Kinect motion sensor, players attack zombies using different types of weapons which degrade over time.
Rock of the Dead	2010	PlayStation 3, Xbox 360	Players must bring down attacking zombies with music by using a guitar controller.
Shadow Man	1999	Dreamcast, Nintendo 64, PlayStation, Windows	Players assume the role of Mike Leroi, who is cursed to be a zombie slave but has also been chosen to be the Shadow Man. Shadow Man is able to travel between the living world and Deadside, which features zombies and flying corpses.
Shellshock 2: Blood Trails	2009	PlayStation 3, Windows, Xbox 360	First-person shooter, a zombie outbreak in Vietnam during the Vietnam War is caused by a virus called WhiteKnight.
Siren series	2003–2008	PlayStation 2, PlayStation 3	Survival horror series. The primary enemies of the game, "shibito" (屍人), are living dead who can be 'sightjacked' by the player, allowing them to observe the gameworld through the shibito's eyes.
Space Pirates and Zombies	2011	Windows	A shooter game set in space, containing role-playing and strategy elements. The titular zombies emerge late in the game and operate in a similar manner to the Borg of Star Trek, by assimilating space ships and crew into an undead horde.
State of Decay	2013	Windows, Xbox Live Arcade	Unlike games such as Left 4 Dead and Dead Island, State of Decay focused more on survival, stealth, evasion, distractions, securing the player's resources, and moving through the world than actual zombie combat.
State of Decay 2	2018	Windows, Xbox One	Sequel to State of Decay. It places emphasis on how the player's leaderships skills fare against an onslaught of problems, such as diminishing survival resources, group trust and morale, zombie extermination, base defenses, and people's lives. The game combines elements of shooters, stealth, role-playing and strategy games and the game challenges players to survive by exploring, scavenging, and fighting the undead.
Stubbs the Zombie in Rebel Without a Pulse	2005	macOS, Windows, Xbox, Xbox 360	A third-person comedy game played as the titular zombie. Humans are converted into zombies when killed by Stubbs, creating an army of zombies.
Survival Crisis Z	2004	Windows	Features two different play modes, story and arcade, the former involves surviving a zombie holocaust by scavenging and interacting with other survivors, the latter is a straightforward shooter game.
Sweet Home	1989	Family Computer	One of the first survival horror games, it featured zombies as enemies representing previous visitors who never made it out of the mansion alive.
Teenage Zombies: Invasion of the Alien Brain Thingys!	2008	Nintendo DS	Platform game with puzzle elements, players control three zombies with different abilities in order to thwart the alien brains which have invaded Earth.
Terraria	2011	Windows, iOS, Android	A 2D sandbox game with gameplay that involves exploration, construction, and mining in order to avoid monsters, such as zombies, to survive.
They Hunger series	1999	Windows	A trilogy of single-player mods for Half-Life, the first is set in a rural area of the United States of America. Later in the series settings such as missile silos are explored.
Time Knight VS. Zombies	2023	Windows	A fast-paced Roguelike where a knight has to stop the invasion of zombies coming from another time. Playable alone or online. Featuring pixel art in a fun environment.
TimeSplitters: Future Perfect	2005	PlayStation 2, Xbox, GameCube	The third installment of the popular time travel-themed first-person shooter contained playable multiplayer characters and enemy AI that are commonly referred to as Zombies
Touch the Dead	2007	Nintendo DS	On-rail, first-person shooter. A prisoner named Rob Steiner escapes from jail while battling countless zombies, the player attacks by using the console's touchscreen.
The Typing of the Dead	1999	Dreamcast, Windows	A touch typing trainer version of The House of the Dead 2.
Undead Knights	2009	PlayStation Portable	A hack 'n slash game featuring a trio of undead knights who can reanimate their victims as zombies and send them into battle.
Unturned	2014	PlayStation 4, Mac, Windows, Xbox One, Xbox Series X	A multiplayer survival game described by one critic as a combination of Dayz and Minecraft. The game uses the free-to-play payment model.
Urban Dead	2005	Browser	A massively multiplayer online game where players choose whether to play as a human survivor or a zombie in the battle for control of a quarantined city.
Voodoo Kid	1997	Windows	The artistic concept of the game is heavily based on voodoo culture. All characters excluding the unnamed protagonist are soulless zombies bounded to a ghost ship.
The Walking Dead	2012	Android, iOS, Kindle Fire HDX, macOS, PlayStation 3, PlayStation 4, Ouya, PlayStation Vita, Windows, Xbox 360, Xbox One	Based on the comic series and being developed by Telltale Games, this licensed video game is due to be "multi-year, multi-platform, multi-title".
The Walking Dead: Survival Instinct	2013	PlayStation 3, Wii U, Windows, Xbox 360	
Warcraft III series	2002–2003	Mac OS, macOS, Windows	The Undead Scourge race contains classic flesh-consuming zombies (Ghouls and Abominations). The Forsaken race in the later World of Warcraft MMORPG are zombies who had rebelled against the Scourge.
World of the Living Dead Resurrection	2013	Browser	Survival Strategy Browser Game currently in closed beta testing. Players compete for resources in order to keep their group of survivors alive in a zombie plagued Los Angeles.
World War Z	2019	Windows, PlayStation 4, Xbox One	The game is a co-operative, third-person shooter in which 4 players fight against massive hordes of zombies in locations including: New York, Jerusalem, Moscow, Tokyo, and Marseille, France.
World War Z: Aftermath	2021	Windows, PlayStation 5, PlayStation 4, Xbox One, Xbox Series X/S	Sequel to World War Z (2019).
The X-Files: Resist or Serve	2004	PlayStation 2	A survival horror game based on the television series, The X-Files. The player can play as either Fox Mulder or Dana Scully, who are investigating a town overrun by zombies.
Yakuza: Dead Souls	2011	PlayStation 3	Part of Sega's Yakuza series, the martial combat of previous titles has been replaced with an emphasis on gun battles. The city has been infected with a zombie plague and now a third of the population are zombies.
Zafehouse: Diaries series	2012	Windows	Single-player turn-based strategy games, portrayed mostly via a map and diary. The games require management of survivors' interpersonal relationships in addition to standard zombie survival actions.
Zombi	1986	Amiga, Amstrad CPC, Atari ST, Commodore 64, Plus/4, ZX Spectrum	Icon-driven graphic adventure inspired by the film Dawn of the Dead. A group of survivors is forced to land their helicopter atop a zombie infested shopping mall, the vehicle must be refueled so they can escape.
Zombie Army Trilogy	2015	Windows, PlayStation 4, Xbox One	A third person zombie shooter set during world war 2
Zombie Army 4: Dead War	2020	Windows, PlayStation 4, Xbox One	A third person zombie shooter set during world war 2. It is a sequel to Zombie Army Trilogy.
Zombie Apocalypse	2009	PlayStation 3, Xbox 360	The player has to shoot or decapitate zombies across seven different areas.
Zombie Driver	2009	Windows	An overhead-view mission-based driving game taking place in a zombie apocalypse.
Zombie Gunship	2011	iOS	Players act as the gunner on an AC-130U Spectre gunship. The object is to destroy as many zombies and monsters as possible, while helping as many human civilians as possible reach the safety of a bunker, before the zombies reach the bunker or too many friendly fire incidents occur.
The Zombie Island of Dr. Ned	2009	PlayStation 3, Windows, Xbox 360	Zombie-themed downloadable content for Borderlands featuring a swamp island filled with undead.
Zombie Lane	2011	Facebook, Google+, iOS	A top-down/third person social networking Facebook game. Players must repair their neighbourhood after a zombie apocalypse and locate their missing wife and dog.
Zombie Massacre	1998	Amiga	First-person shooter, clone of the popular Amiga first person shooter Doom
Zombie Nation	1990	NES	Shoot 'em up in which players control a disembodied samurai's head. A mysterious meteor called Darc Seed crashes to Earth and turns the inhabitants of the United States into zombies.
Zombie Panic! Source	2007	Windows	A multiplayer Half-Life 2 mod, in which players are divided into two teams, survivors and zombies. When survivors are killed, they become zombies.
Zombie Parkour Runner	2011	iOS	A parkour game where the player must retrieve the items stolen from them by zombies.
Zombie Revenge	1999	Arcade, Dreamcast	Beat 'em up where players choose one of three characters to pummel zombies.
Zombie Tycoon	2009	PlayStation Portable	Downloadable real-time strategy game. Players control three teams of up to eight zombies to attack the living.
Zombie Wranglers	2009	Xbox 360	An Xbox Live game where players choose one of four characters to "wrangle" zombies through twenty levels.
Zombie Zombie	1984	ZX Spectrum	The player must rid a city of the undead by luring them over the edge of structures. These can be constructed with a helicopter, which can be landed to allow the zombies to pursue the player character.
Zombies	2011	Windows Phone, Xbox 360	
Zombies Ate My Neighbors	1993	Genesis, Super NES	Shooter game played from an overhead perspective. The game parodies B-movies and features zombies amongst several other types of monster.
Zombies, Run!	2012	iOS, Android	An immersive running game.
ZombiU	2012	Wii U	A 2012 survival horror game. The player controls a random survivor who must attempt to survive a zombie apocalypse running amok in London.
Thief: The Dark Project	1998	Windows	A 1998 first person stealth game. Some missions include zombies.
The Dark Mod	2012	Windows, Linux, MacOS	A stealth game inspired by the Thief game series. Some missions include zombies.
Rebuild 3: Gangs of Deadsville	2015	Windows, MacOS, iOS, Android	A strategy city builder game about managing a group of survivors during a zombie apocalypse.
