= Skin Deep (video game) =

2025 video game

- Developer: Blendo Games
- Publisher: Annapurna Interactive
- Director: Brendon Chung
- Designers: Suzanne Will; Tynan Wales; Brendon Chung
- Programmers: Suzanne Will; Brendon Chung; Sanjay Madhav; Eric Itomura
- Artists: Suzanne Will; Tynan Wales; Brendon Chung
- Writer: Laura Michet
- Composer: Priscilla Snow
- Engine: id Tech 4
- Platform: Windows
- Release: 30 April 2025
- Genres: First-person shooter, stealth

Skin Deep is a first-person shooter science fiction video game developed by Blendo Games and published by Annapurna Interactive, released on 30 April 2025 for Windows. The game follows an open-ended structure, heavily influenced by immersive sim mechanics, which allows players to approach missions using various playstyles. The player assumes the role of Nina Pasadena, an "insurance commando" who is cryogenically stored aboard various starships as a security measure. When space pirates hijack a vessel and trigger a silent alarm, Nina is awakened from stasis and must navigate the environment using a variety of stealth, combat, and environmental interactions to neutralize the threat.

== Gameplay ==
Skin Deep is an action video game played from the first-person perspective. Players undertake a series of missions to release crew members from ships that are hijacked by pirates. The game has been described as an immersive sim; the missions are open-ended and present multiple methods available to the player to achieve their objectives. Completion requires players to unlock all the feline crew of the ship from cages on the wall. Once all the crew have been freed, the player must escape by accessing a rescue pod, or fend off reinforcements by either optionally defeating all the enemies, or hijacking the arrival pod the pirates arrive in. Keycards, often held by enemies, are necessary to free the crew from cages.

Players have a map at their disposal that displays the layout of the ship, airlocks and vents, and the status of powered items or locked doors. Many passages will initially be locked, requiring the player to locate keys or notes containing passwords to open the way. The player can access a "Memory Palace" menu to re-read notes collected throughout the level. Navigating vents can allow the player to pass enemy detection, but they can only turn around in certain segments, and may have dust causing the player to sneeze and alert enemies to their location. Players can breathe in space, and are able to break windows or open airlocks to navigate outside the ship. Accessing an Info Station on the ship can provide additional information on the location of important rooms, people, or utilities. Lost and Found boxes can be used to recover items lost in space.

Combat often requires players to find items throughout the level to stun enemies and pounce on them. Examples of methods include using pepper to cause an enemy to sneeze, or using soap or a banana peel to make the enemy slip. Only five items can be carried at a time, and some have durability, meaning they can only be used a limited number of times. When the player pounces on a downed enemy, they can slam the enemy into items in the level to down them. Once downed, players must remove the head of the enemy and dispose of it into space through objects such as toilets and trash chutes. Enemies are equipped with "skull-saver" devices, which allow their heads to detach from their bodies when defeated. If not disposed of, the head will float to a Respawn Pad and regenerate the body of the enemy. Enemies can discover the player and attempt to alert others using an alarm. The player must end this alert by interacting with security mics or walkie-talkies. When attacked, players lose health, which can be recover health from health stations, although these are locked during alerts. If Nina is downed, her "auto-defib" activates, and will revive the player before they bleed out. However, if the player is downed after the de-fib has been used up, they must recover health from a health station before they die, or the mission fails. Nina does not have shoes, and if she steps on broken glass, it sticks in her feet and causes her to bleed. Glass can be pulled out, however, as can projectiles embedded in her body.

Between missions, Nina returns to her apartment in space, where the player can read emails to progress the plot or provide interactions with the cats the player has freed throughout the game. The player can also play cassettes found hidden throughout levels.

== Plot ==
The player character, Nina Pasadena, is an insurance commando for the Manx Insurance Agent Organization (MIAOCorp), who is placed in cryonic stasis aboard spaceships and thawed when necessary to free the crew from space pirates. Early in the game, Nina encounters a group of pirates named the Numb Bunch, who have unusually sophisticated technology and answer to a masked figure. The figure instructs the pirates that she wants them to kill Nina Pasadena, revealing that Nina has had a contract taken out on her. After the mission, Nina acquires a high-powered camera that can zoom across galaxies, which reveals that the masked figure that leads the pirate gang is Nina's clone, Zena, whom Nina created by accident during a past mishap in "wonky space."

With help from Little Lion, Nina's former partner in crime, she slowly learns more about Zena and her motivations. Zena considers herself the morally good and legitimate version of Nina, which angers Nina greatly. Between story beats, Nina continues insurance missions on different ships, occasionally re-encountering the same cats and pirates as previous missions. When each mission is finished, Nina returns to her space habitat, where the player can read Nina's email, play minigames and sometimes learn new game mechanics via training tools sent to Nina by MIAOCorp.

After successfully planting a Manitoba Beast Bug in Zena's sandwich (Note: Similar to another mission with the Manitoba Beast Bug in Gravity Bone, a prior Blendo title) at a space pirate convention disguised as a dentist convention, Nina is finally able to track Zena to her hideout. This turns out to be a fortress made of ships hidden in wonky space. Nina, Little Lion and the cats Nina freed attack. Little Lion gets held up blocking a fan so Nina can pass through, and begs her to spare Zena's life, as he sees both of them as his best friend.

When Nina finally gets face to face with Zena, the two end up accidentally mirroring each other's movements in a circular room. When the player manages to trick Zena into breaking the symmetry, Zena falls to what would be her death, only to be saved at the last second by Nina. The two face each other, and the player is given a prompt to "synchronize." This begins a scripted sequence in which the two wordlessly study each other as psychedelic effects whirl around them.

In the final sequence, the story skips forward a week to a beach party, where the cats and Numb Bunch pirates are playing volleyball and otherwise relaxing. Nina and Zena, who now see each other as sisters, talk warmly. The player is then returned to Nina's habitat, where they can replay past missions via a "Dream Machine" to seek unfinished side-quest objectives.

== Development ==
Skin Deep was created by California-based independent developer Blendo Games, the studio of creative director Brendon Chung and creator of titles including Thirty Flights of Loving and Quadrilateral Cowboy. Chung was heavily inspired by other shooter titles including Far Cry 2, and sought to make a game with "interesting and funny" design choices that were unexpected, such as the inclusion of odor and dust in Skin Deep. The setting of the game was stated by Chung to be in the same universe as Chung's 2010 title Flotilla. Chung described the game's tone as "light and goofy", describing it "like Die Hard but with more comedy". The game was developed in an open-source port of the Doom 3 id Tech 4 engine, with Chung stating the decision was to achieve a "timeless look" and due to its "nice and tidy" codebase.

Development of Skin Deep commenced in July 2018, with an initial trailer announcing the game released in October of that year. In April 2021, the developer announced a partnership with Annapurna Interactive to publish the game, with an accompanying trailer. Gameplay was first showcased by the publisher at the Annapurna Interactive Showcase in July 2022. A demo for the game was released for the Steam Next Fest in March 2025. The game was released on 30 April 2025.

The company released the source code for the game in June 2025, though the game assets themselves were not released under an open-source license.

== Reception ==
Reception

Aggregate scores
Aggregator	Score
Metacritic	79/100
OpenCritic	73% recommend

Review scores
Publication	Score
Digital Trends	3/5
Eurogamer	4/5
GameSpot	8/10
GamesRadar+	4.5/5
PC Gamer (US)	88%
Shacknews	7/10
The Guardian	3/5

According to review aggregator Metacritic, Skin Deep received "generally favorable" reviews. Fellow review aggregator OpenCritic assessed that the game received strong approval, being recommended by 73% of critics. Reviewers generally praised the game's open-ended immersive sim design. Giovanni Colantonio of Digital Trends enjoyed the "emergent moments of chaos" from the use of the game's objects. Describing the game as the "best and deepest stealth sandboxes I've ever played", Morgan Park of PC Gamer stated the item-based design allowed for "complex simulation" and pushed him to "intimately learn spaces and look for utility in mundane objects".

However, other reviews critiqued the game's implementation of its mechanics. Some critics discussed that it was easy for players to rely on a few methods to progress in the game, with GameSpot writing that "methods can become too reliable at times, allowing players to recreate past successes without much friction". Digital Trends wrote that the game's design failed to support its vision, stating that Skin Deep "has great systems, but it's short on great solutions" due to the "structural repetition" across levels and limited number of "creative challenges". Critics also disagreed on the extent to which levels offered variety. GamesRadar considered the missions to be "wildly different from one another"; other reviewers felt the levels lacked sufficient variation to be distinctive or memorable.

Critics mostly appreciated the game's tone and humor, with GameSpot describing the game as "reliably laugh-out-loud funny" and providing a "welcome change in presentation" for the genre.Digital Trends considered the "absurd" comedic tone of the game to build on the strengths of the developer's "signature style" in previous games. However, whilst Tom Regan The Guardian enjoyed the game's "gleefully slapstick" approach, he considered that "the never-ending feline puns and overly-zany tone" may be "too silly for genre games".

The graphics and visual presentation of the game received a mostly positive reception. Digital Trends found the game's "proudly polygonal objects, flat textures, and block headed characters" worked well and echoed games such as System Shock. GamesRadar positively compared the game's retrofuturistic presentation to the game No One Lives Forever. However, The Guardian described the id Tech 4 engine's graphics as "archaic" and "disappointingly primitive".

=== Awards ===
Year	Award	Category	Result	Ref.
2025	Golden Joystick Awards	Best Indie Game	Nominated	
2026	28th Independent Games Festival Awards	Excellence in Design	Pending	
