= Blendo Games =

American independent video game development company

- Type: Private
- Industry: Video games
- Founded: 2010; 16 years ago
- Founder: Brendon Chung
- Headquarters: Culver City, California, United States
- Products: Air Forte; Atom Zombie Smasher; Flotilla series; Gravity Bone; Quadrilateral Cowboy
- Website: blendogames.com

Blendo Games is an American independent video game development company based in Culver City, California. It was founded by Brendon Chung in 2010 and is primarily a one-person effort. Blendo Games gained widespread exposure with Gravity Bone and Flotilla. The following Atom Zombie Smasher was met with critical praise. The studio has also released several other games in several genres.

== Background ==
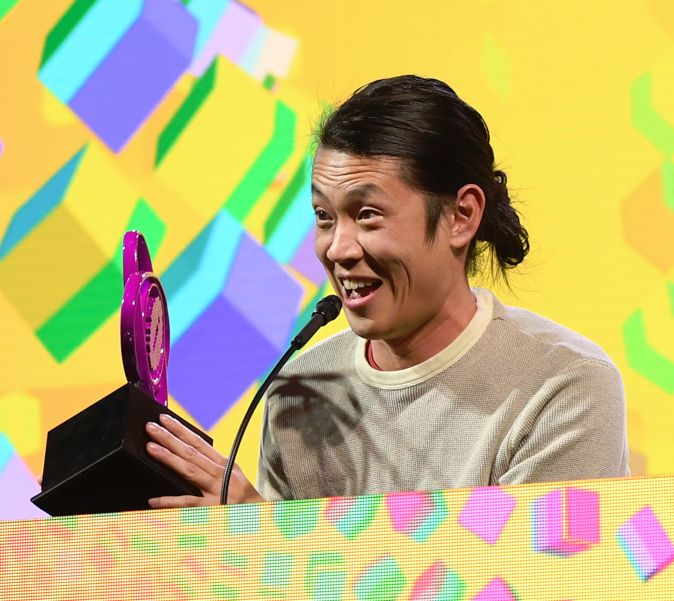
Brendon Chung at the 2017 Game Developers Choice Awards

Chung had done hobbyist programming, such as modding for games like Quake 2 and Half-Life, for about a decade before being hired as a designer at Pandemic Studios. While there, he worked on The Lord of the Rings: Conquest and Full Spectrum Warrior: Ten Hammers, although he continued to work on personal projects, including an episodic Citizen Abel series that toyed with traditional mechanics of first-person shooters. Chung considered his first officially released game to be the espionage game Gravity Bone in 2008. In November 2009, Electronic Arts shut down Pandemic Studios and Chung began development on Flotilla, a space combat game that takes cues from an abandoned personal project Chung had worked on previously. Flotilla was released in 2010.

Later that same year, Blendo Games released Air Forte, an edutainment game in which the player indicates their knowledge about math, geography, and vocabulary by flying a plane in response to prompts. In 2011, Chung released real-time strategy game Atom Zombie Smasher, which received critical praise from several outlets and was featured at the 2011 Penny Arcade Expo, as well as being part of the 3rd Humble Indie Bundle charity drive.

A sequel to Gravity Bone, Thirty Flights of Loving, was developed to support a Kickstarter project for the Idle Thumbs podcast, and released in 2012. Following Thirty Flights of Loving, Chung began what would become over four years of development on Quadrilateral Cowboy, which released in 2016. Flotilla 2, a virtual reality sequel to Flotilla, was released in August 2018. In October 2018, a new project titled Skin Deep was revealed to be in development at Blendo Games, with a later announcement in 2021 revealing that Annapurna Interactive would publish the game. Skin Deep was released in April 2025.

== Culture ==
Blendo Games remains a one-man studio, though according to a 2016 feature in Gamasutra, Chung spends some time working in a shared office space called Glitch City. He has also directly collaborated with several individuals on several projects. The musical score of Thirty Flights of Loving was composed by Chris Remo, and the design of Quadrilateral Cowboy was a joint effort between Chung and Tynan Wales. The Mac and Linux ports of Quadrilateral Cowboy were done by Aaron Melcher, and the game's art book was ported to those same platforms by Ethan Lee. Chung has also indicated he gets play testing help from his friends and family.

== Barista ==
Barista is a series of four first-person games for Microsoft Windows by Brendon Chung. All of the games involve the player character waking up.

The first game is a modification for Doom II: Hell on Earth. In an interview, Chung stated that his inspirations for the first game included the Doom Bible and Bungie's Marathon.

Chung has indicated the second game was an independent study project developed while he was in college. It centers on a nameless spaceship pilot and features a disjointed story line. Several characters are featured, including a talking skull and an unidentified woman. The skull mentions a person named Hannah, though when an interviewer suggested the unidentified woman was Hannah, Chung said "she's not Hannah. You never meet Hannah."

The third game is a modification for Doom 3. Chung has indicated he developed the game so he could learn the constraints of the Id Tech 4 engine before using it on a larger project.

The fourth game is a modification for Half-Life 2.

== Games ==
Year	Title	Platform(s)	Publisher
2008	Gravity Bone	Windows	Blendo Games
2010	Flotilla	Xbox 360, Windows	Blendo Games
2010	Air Forte	Xbox 360, Windows, Linux, macOS	Blendo Games
2011	Atom Zombie Smasher	Windows, Linux, macOS	Blendo Games
2012	Thirty Flights of Loving	Windows, Linux, macOS	Blendo Games
2016	Quadrilateral Cowboy	Windows, Linux, macOS	Blendo Games
2018	Flotilla 2	Windows (HTC Vive/Oculus Rift)	Blendo Games
2025	Skin Deep	Windows	Annapurna Interactive
