= Quadrilateral Cowboy =

2016 puzzle video game

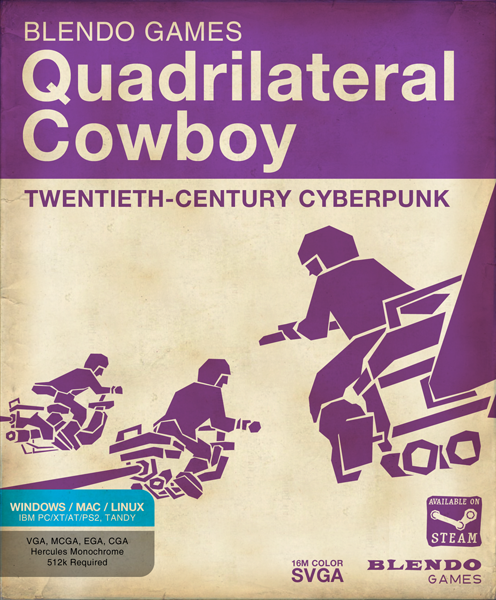
- Developer: Blendo Games
- Publisher: Blendo Games
- Designers: Brendon Chung; Tynan Wales
- Engine: id Tech 4
- Platforms: Windows, macOS, Linux
- Release: Windows; July 25, 2016; macOS, Linux; October 1, 2016
- Genres: Puzzle, adventure
- Mode: Single-player

Quadrilateral Cowboy is a first-person puzzle-adventure video game by independent developer Blendo Games. The game was released on July 25, 2016, for Microsoft Windows, and on October 1, 2016, for macOS and Linux.

In Quadrilateral Cowboy, the player assumes the role of a computer hacker in a cyberpunk-themed 1980s setting. The player is tasked with coordinating a series of heists, often including puzzles that must be overcome by writing computer programs.

Quadrilateral Cowboy was developed over four years, using a modified version of the Id Tech 4 engine. The game received "generally favorable" reviews on Metacritic and has received a number of indie game accolades, including the Seumas McNally Grand Prize.

== Gameplay ==
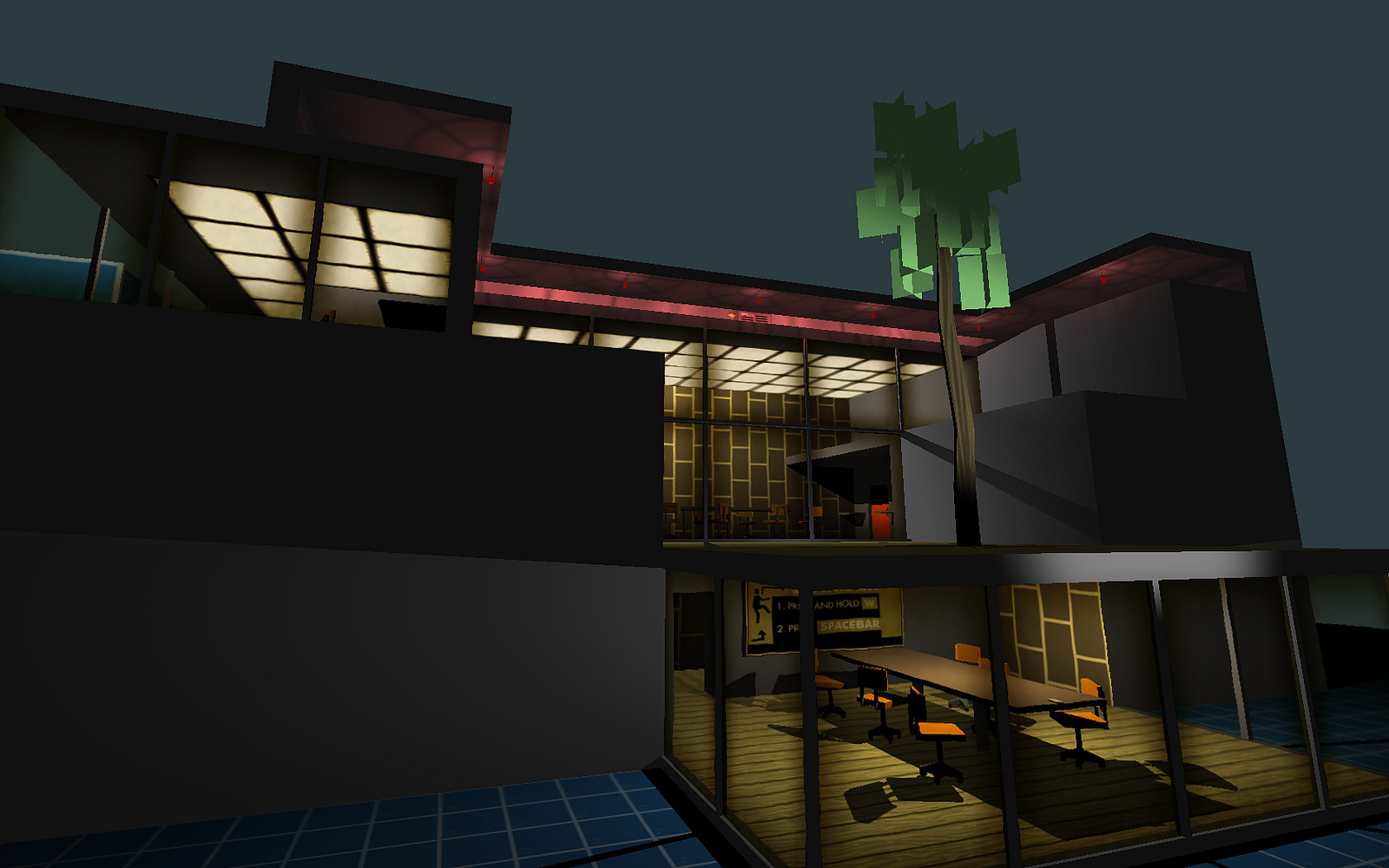
Players will be required to perform heists from buildings, overcoming their various security systems.

In Quadrilateral Cowboy, the player takes the role of a computer hacker in the 1980s, armed with a "top-of-the-line hacking deck outfitted with a 56.6k modem and a staggering 256k RAM". According to Brendon Chung, the sole developer behind Blendo Games, Quadrilateral Cowboy takes place in the same universe as his previous games, Gravity Bone and Thirty Flights of Loving, and shares the same "blocky" aesthetics.

The game is played from the first-person perspective. The player acts as the hacker overseeing one or more adept agents that have missions to infiltrate buildings and steal documents. Each agent has a different set of abilities; in addition to the player's hacker with their Deck, another character will have a saw to break through doors, while another will be able to climb and move quickly through levels. The player will experience what the agents would see through virtual reality goggles that relay what they see to the hacker character. When the agents encounter locked doors, cameras, and other security features, the player, as the hacker, will have to create a program – typing this as code on their physical keyboards – that manipulates the security features without setting off additional alarms to allow the agents to sneak by. An example shown in an early preview is using the code cam8.off(3) to disable "Camera 8" for 3 seconds; disabling the camera any longer would raise a security alert. As such, the player must create the program with appropriate timing to allow them to make it through the various obstacles without triggering additional alarms. Through the game, the player will gain access to other gadgets, like a rover to scout and collect objects; these too can be programmed by the player to aid in the heist.

The heists are planned out in a virtual reality simulator within the game, the Heist Planner. This allows the player, as the hacker, to adjust the control and timing of the agents and intrusions within the system. This area will also provide a primitive in-game tutorial system for the player to learn the hacking mechanics, with instructions shown as sticky notes attached to various objects or on signs held up by characters.

== Development ==
Chung, the sole developer behind Blendo Games, explained that his philosophy for making games is that he likes "to experiment with different genres and try different things", and considers Cowboy to be a "very different direction" from his last game, Thirty Flights of Loving. The concept of the game bore out of Chung's experience with computing in the 1980s, which he considered in sharp contrast with modern computing today; Chung stated "There's something satisfying, something tactile, about punching commands into the computer, slamming the enter key, and mastering this new language." Further, he considered how the computer hacker stereotype is portrayed by Hollywood, and expanded the setting and story in view of that. Chung noted that the representation of hacking in other video games has typically been very simplified, such as color matching minigames, and wanted to develop a game that explored hacking in more detail. Cowboy was also inspired by Chung's father, a mechanic that would often need to disassemble equipment to figure out how the various parts interacted, and wanted to create a similar approach for the player in having to analyze the security systems' layouts within the game. Chung mentions Neuromancer, Ghost in the Shell, Snow Crash, Thief, Rainbow Six, and Uplink as influences for the game.

Unlike Blendo's previous games that used a modified id Tech 2 engine, Chung used the id Tech 4 engine for Cowboy, which provided "a lot more modern functionality" than the earlier engine. Chung had brought the game to the 2012 PAX Prime convention in Seattle; though those that had tried the game were initially concerned about having to learn programming, Chung found that they grasped the language easily and were able to complete the game's puzzles without additional help. Several of these players made comparisons of the game to William Gibson's Neuromancer novel and other cyberpunk themes.

Shortly after the game's release, Blendo released the source code for Quadrilateral Cowboy under the GNU General Public License.

== Reception ==
Reception

Aggregate score
Aggregator	Score
Metacritic	81/100

Review scores
Publication	Score
Destructoid	9/10
Game Informer	9.5/10
GameRevolution	4/5
GameSpot	9/10
IGN	8.5/10
PC Gamer (US)	80/100
Polygon	8/10
The Guardian	4/5
VideoGamer.com	8/10

Quadrilateral Cowboy received "generally favorable reviews" from critics according to review aggregator Metacritic. Edmond Tran from GameSpot and Destructoid's Patrick Hancock praised how the game tells a story without the use of dialogue, and stated they enjoyed exploring the characters' homes to find out their backstory. However, many reviewers felt that the game does not fully explore its potential because it introduces and abandons new mechanics at a fast rate. With the final mission falling short of expectations, critics hoped that user-created levels on Steam Workshop could provide the missing ultimate challenge. Complaints about frequent crashes and glitches were also raised.

Quadrilateral Cowboy won the Grand Jury Award at the 2013 Indiecade Festival. It won the Seumas McNally Grand Prize and the Excellence in Design for the 2017 Independent Games Festival awards, as well as named an honorable mention for the Innovation Award for the 2017 Game Developers Choice Awards. It was nominated for the Matthew Crump Cultural Innovation Award for the 2017 SXSW Gaming Awards.
