= Zombie Panic! Source =

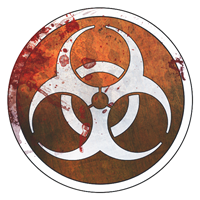
- Zombie Panic! Source logo
- Developer: Zombie Panic! Team
- Publisher: Zombie Panic! Team
- Engine: Source Engine
- Platform: Microsoft Windows
- Release: December 28, 2007 (v1.0) October 3, 2008 (v1.3) (Steam release) October 31, 2025 (v3.3) (Latest release)
- Genres: First-person shooter, survival horror
- Mode: Multiplayer

Zombie Panic! Source is a cooperative survival-horror Half-Life 2 first-person shooter modification. It is the sequel to the Half-Life mod Zombie Panic. Set in the middle of a zombie apocalypse, players start as a small group of survivors attempting to stay alive. Each map will have its own objectives to complete and win the round or survive by a period of time.

Initially released on December 28, 2007, via Mod DB page as a public beta (v1.0) and later re-released for Steam via Steamworks on October 8, 2008, as a free-to-play game.

== Gameplay ==
At the start of each round, players can either choose to join the human team or volunteer to be the first zombie. If no one volunteers the game will pick one zombie randomly, and the game begins. The starter zombie's goal is to kill the humans while the human goal is to stay alive as long as possible, complete objectives, or even wipe out all the zombies. The catch is that when a human dies he will simply join the ranks of the undead, now ready to finish off his old living teammates. The humans cannot tell by the player list who is alive and who is undead.

Eventually, there will only be one survivor still standing if everything goes wrong, his back against the wall while facing the animated corpses of his former allies. In a survival round, the zombies team only has a certain number of reinforcements (lives), and when a zombie is killed they lose a life from the counter. However, when a human is killed they gain 1 life. When the zombies run out of lives, the remaining survivors win the round by killing off the remaining undead left on the map. In objective rounds, zombies get an unlimited number of lives while the humans must complete a variety of map-based objectives to win.

=== Game Modes ===
- Survival Mode: Players are tasked to survive against other players as more zombies are created.
- Objective Mode: Players are tasked to either escape or destroy the horde of zombies. Everyone must team up to look for keys, hack items, turn power on, and reach escape vehicles.
- Hardcore Mode: Players are given tougher enemies and less supplies to scavenge

== Development ==
Zombie Panic! Source began development in early 2005, and released their first public beta on December 28, 2007.

On October 8, 2008, it was one of the first five "mods" to be released on Steam by Valve under their new commitment to easily accessible quality user-created modifications in the Steam Store.

== Reception ==
=== Awards ===
- BEST UPCOMING MOTY 2007 First Place
- MOTY 2008 Second Place
- BEST MOTY 2009 Honorable Mention
- RELEASED MOTY 2010 Honorable Mention

== See also ==
- Contagion
- List of zombie video games
- Survival horror
