= Contagion (video game) =

- Contagion
- Developer: Monochrome LLC
- Engine: Source
- Platform: Microsoft Windows
- Release: April 11, 2014
- Genres: First-person shooter, survival horror
- Mode: Multiplayer

Contagion is a survival horror first-person shooter video game, developed and published for PC by American independent studio Monochrome. It is the spiritual successor to Zombie Panic! Source. The game was mostly self-funded of its development, but with the support of others via a successful Kickstarter campaign, it was able to be released on Steam as an Early Access title. Contagion released on October 25, 2013 as a Steam Early Access title and was published as full release on April 11, 2014.

== Gameplay ==
Contagion is a multiplayer focused game with three different game modes; Hunted, Escape, and Extraction. There is also a beta game mode called Flatline.

Hunted, which supports up to 16 players, is a free-for-all "deathmatch" game mode in which players fight each other, while A.I.-controlled zombies wander the level and serve as an environmental hazard. When a player is killed, they respawn as a zombie and can participate alongside the A.I.-controlled zombies in attacking the surviving players. The goal of the game is to be the last living player.

Escape is a cooperative game mode in which a team of up to 8 players is tasked with progressing through a level, fighting through zombies while completing various mission objectives in a linear order with the ultimate goal of escaping the map.

Extraction is another cooperative game mode in which the goal is to explore a location and rescue a number of A.I.-controlled non-player character survivors. When reaching an area with survivors to save, the players will have to fend off a horde with the resources found in that area; and after a few minutes, you can extract those survivors at the border of the location, where the survivors will drop the weapons and ammo they're carrying. If all the survivors of the current area die, the players will fail.

In both game modes, when a player is killed they respawn as a zombie and are tasked with helping the A.I.-controlled zombies hunt down the remaining human players; you can also turn into a zombie if a zombie attack infects the player (Though this and player zombie respawn can be turned off) . Player-controlled zombies are faster and more maneuverable than A.I.-controlled zombie enemies and therefore present a greater threat to human players. Both Escape and Extraction can be played off-line by a single player, although they are geared towards multi-player gameplay.

Flatline is a multiplayer-geared wave based survival mode. The player starts in a singular location, where new parts of the map open every few waves. At the end of a wave, players who died the previous round are resurrected and all players have the option to visit a shop/safehouse and get better weapons/equipment.

Panic Objective and Panic Classic emulate the previous game of the "franchise", Zombie Panic Source.

Contagion is distinguished from other similar games in the genre in that it features "Romero Zombies" (zombies akin to those seen in the Night of the Living Dead series of films by director George A. Romero). Resources such as weapons and ammunition are scarce, encouraging more precise and methodical gameplay. Unlike other games in the genre, Contagion does not feature zombies with special abilities, with the exception of a rare riot cop zombie wearing body armor that can survive significantly more damage than a regular zombie.

== Reception ==
Reception

Aggregate score
Aggregator	Score
Metacritic	62/100

== See also ==
- List of zombie video games
