= Flotilla (video game) =

2010 video game

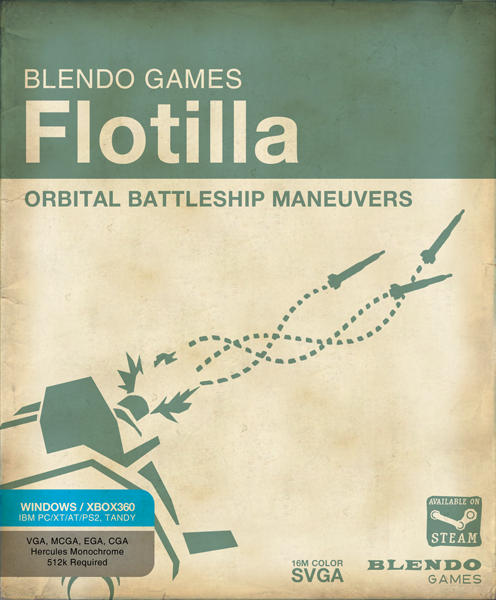
- Flotilla cover art
- Developer: Blendo Games
- Publisher: Blendo Games
- Designer: Brendon Chung
- Engine: XNA
- Platforms: Xbox 360; Windows
- Release: Xbox 360: WW: March 25, 2010; Microsoft Windows: WW: March 29, 2010
- Genre: Turn-based strategy
- Modes: Single-player, multiplayer (co-operative)

Flotilla is a 2010 turn-based strategy space combat video game developed and published by Blendo Games. It was released in March 2010 on Steam for Windows and on Xbox Live Indie Games for the Xbox 360. Flotilla was designed with Microsoft's XNA tools, and its development was influenced by animal characteristics and behavior as well as board games such as Axis and Allies and Arkham Horror. The game takes the player on an adventure through a randomly generated galaxy.

Chung began developing Flotilla immediately after the closure of Pandemic Studios, where he had worked as a designer. The new game used assets imported from Chung's early space combat prototype, Space Piñata. Flotilla incorporates several pieces of classical music in its score, such as Chopin's "Raindrop" prelude. It received mixed reviews from video game media outlets, scoring 72 out of 100 on review aggregate website Metacritic, and was included in Mike Rose's book 250 Indie Games You Must Play.

== Gameplay ==
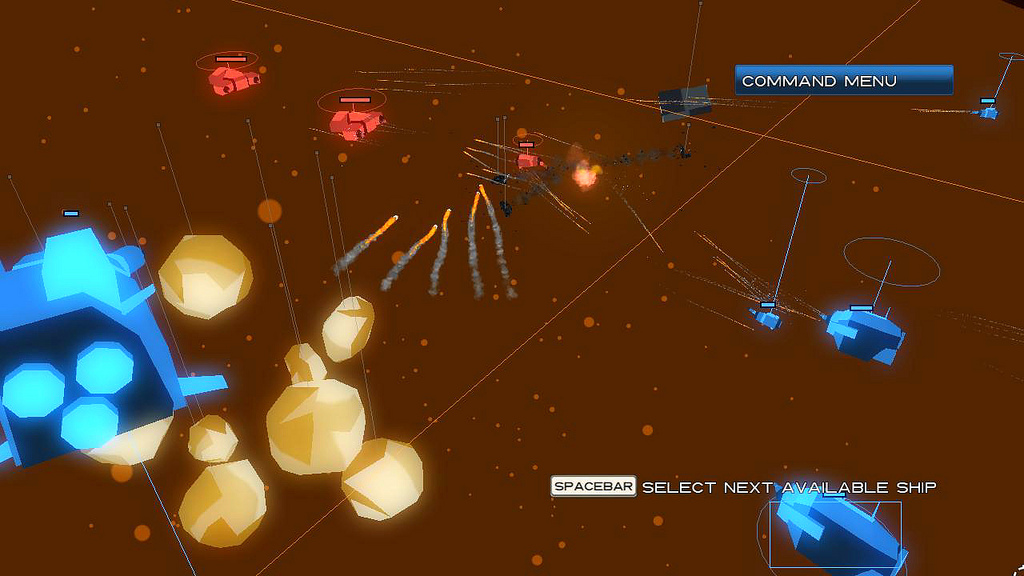
Flotilla allows the player and artificially intelligent opponents to issue orders to their ships every 30 seconds, and then watch their orders play out in real time.

Flotilla is a three-dimensional simultaneous turn-based strategy space combat video game set in a randomly generated galaxy. The player and computer-controlled opponents issue orders to their ships, which are carried out in a simultaneous and real-time fashion over a period of 30 seconds. The game then freezes, and the player and opponents issue new orders to their ships, which are again performed for 30 seconds. This process repeats until one party is defeated. Orders are separated into three groups: attack move, flank move and focus fire. An attack move orders the ships to move and fire simultaneously; a flank move increases the ship's speed but deactivates weapons until the ship stops moving; and focus fire increases fire rate but significantly reduces the ship's speed.

At the beginning, the player is usually given two ships to control, but more become available as the game continues. Ships may be rotated arbitrarily in any direction. The single-player mode is an "adventure" that can be played an indefinite number of times. These adventures have a duration of around 30 minutes. The character dies at the end of each adventure and the player is given the option to play again. A hardcore mode, which removes the solo mode's standard 30-minute time limit, was added later. Each time the player starts a new adventure, a new galaxy is randomly generated and filled with planets and enemy ships. The player may take a short tutorial before beginning the adventure.

Each planet offers a possible quest or challenge to the player. Challenges are tactical battles in which the player must fight against a variety of enemies. However, ships can be harmed only from behind or below; attacks from any other position will be countered by the ships' shields. Upon succeeding, a new chapter is added to the player's character's story, and the player is rewarded with ship upgrades. These upgrades are used to customize ships with improvements, such as increased firing speed or heavier rear armor. The upgrades available to the player upon finishing each encounter with an enemy can vary, so the player may not receive the same upgrade by playing the same encounter in two different adventures. Flotilla has cooperative and split-screen multiplayer modes that can be played with an additional Xbox 360 controller.

== Development ==
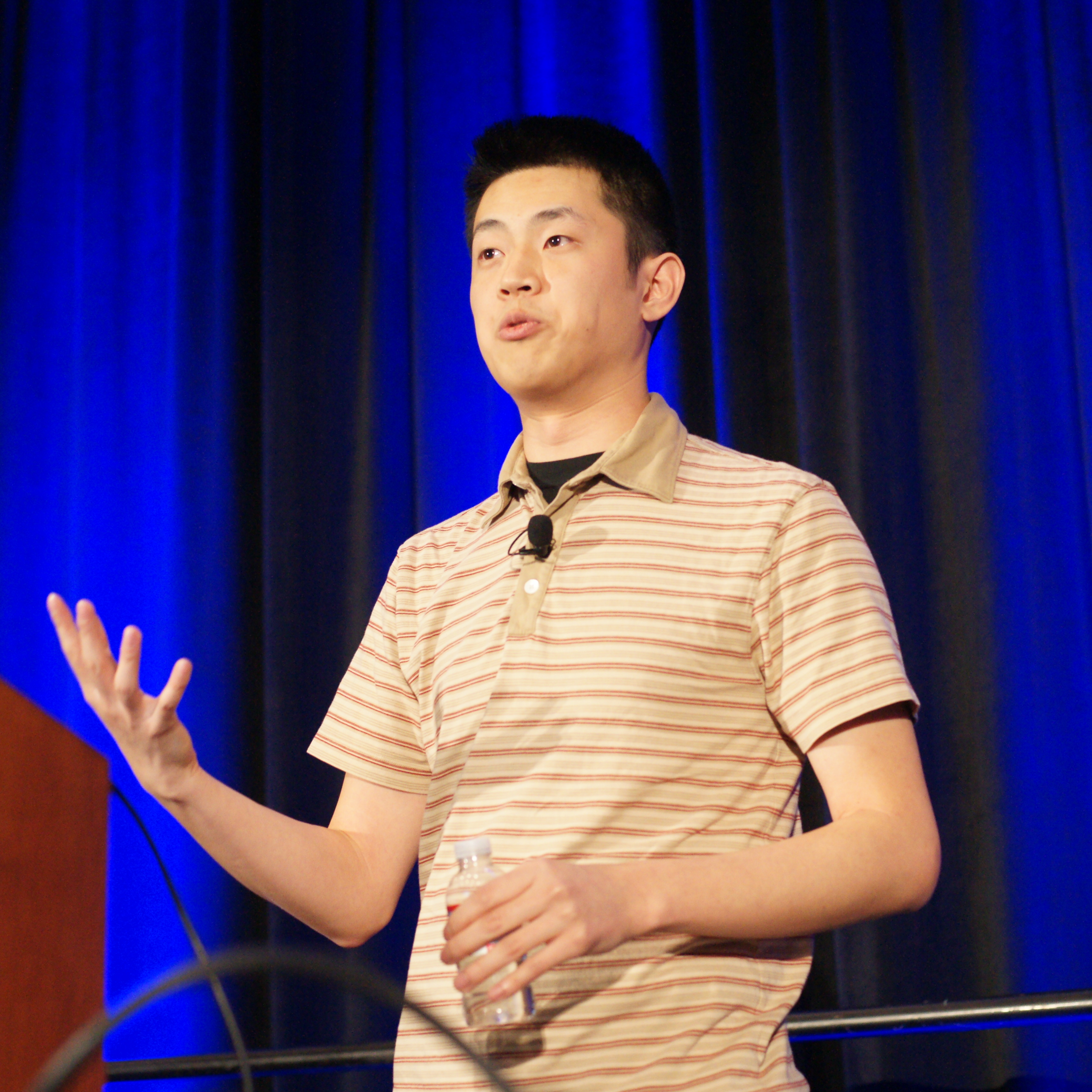
Brendon Chung, developer of Flotilla

Flotilla was developed by Brendon Chung's video game studio, Blendo Games. Chung, who worked as a level designer for Pandemic Studios, previously contributed to the development of Full Spectrum Warrior (2004) and The Lord of the Rings: Conquest (2009). Chung started coding Flotilla in 2009 after Electronic Arts closed Pandemic Studios. He was excited at the time of the studio's closure, and said that "there was adrenaline pumping through my veins". The game was developed using Microsoft XNA, a set of game development tools created by Microsoft.

The concept of Flotilla came from a combination of "sci-fi like Star Wars and submarine movies". Chung explained that he "figured there was enough games about little fighter jets", and that what he had in mind was "a jumbo battleship floating in space". Animals, instead of aliens, are featured as characters. Chung explained that he did so because "any fantastical creature design I came up with would pale in comparison to already-existing designs made by other people." Therefore, instead of trying to solve the problem of creating compelling alien characters, he switched to animals: "[they] have certain built-in characteristics, they were fairly unique in how they weren't typically associated with space adventures." In an interview with SquareGo, Chung said that board games such as Axis and Allies and Arkham Horror had an influential role in the development.

Before Flotilla, Chung worked on a prototype, a two-dimensional turn-based space action game called Space Piñata, whose gameplay and structure were similar to those of the final version of Flotilla. Chung intentionally limited the solo mode's play time as an "experiment in making a short-story generator", such that an adventure could begin and end within a half hour. Following a negative response, a patch was deployed to change this limitation. The patch included a new "hardcore" mode. Flotilla's score incorporates several pieces of classical music, such as Chopin's "Raindrop" prelude. According to Edge magazine, the "Raindrop" prelude gives the battles "an emotional undercurrent". Chung said the soundtrack was designed to create "a tragic feel" and that he wanted to create an "anti-testosterone-fueled" action game.

On February 27, 2020, Flotilla's 10th release anniversary, Blendo Games released the source code to the public as open source software. The source code is Zlib licensed on GitHub; assets are not included and need to be bought.

== Reception ==
Reception

Aggregate score
Aggregator	Score
Metacritic	72/100

Review scores
Publication	Score
Edge	7/10
GameZone	7.0/10
PC Gamer (UK)	78/100
PC Gamer (US)	81/100
PC Zone	71/100

Flotilla received a mixed response from video game journalists upon release. At Metacritic, which assigns a normalized rating out of 100 to reviews from mainstream critics, it received an average score of 72 based on 7 reviews. British magazine Edge included Flotilla in its 2010 list of the Best 20 Indie Games available in the Xbox Live Marketplace, and acknowledged that it was "as exacting as it is quirky, a stiff challenge beneath a sugar coating." Mike Rose included Flotilla in his book 250 Indie Games You Must Play.

The American edition of PC Gamer wrote that Flotilla "is a charmingly crafted bite-size portion of tactical fun". The British PC Gamer wrote that although it had its share of "charm and character," it was nonetheless a random experience. PC Zone UK characterized Flotilla as stylish and funny, but concluded that it was a "sadly disposable" experience. Edge gave a mixed review, but praised the battles, which they considered "engaging despite their simplicity." An editor from the website Charge Shot praised the artificial intelligence and overall design, but criticized the multiplayer mode.

Joe Martin from Bit-Tech named Flotilla a "hilarious and brazenly original" game. However, he criticized the interface and navigation gameplay, which he condemned as "trying to pilot a radio-controlled helicopter with someone else's feet." He also criticized the lack of a speed-up feature in battles, which he felt was necessary. GameZone's Tom Dann also felt frustrated by the ship maneuvering mechanics, though he concluded that they "can also be rewarding and entertaining". Flotilla was nominated for the 2011 Independent Games Festival Visions Award, but lost to Amnesia: The Dark Descent. It was also listed among the Honorable Mentions for the Excellence in Visual Art and Excellence in Design awards.

== Sequel ==
Flotilla 2 was released on August 17, 2018. It is designed for virtual reality hardware and initially exclusive to the HTC Vive headset; the virtual reality aspect allows players to move around the space environment to plan out their tactics.
