= Thirty Flights of Loving =

2012 adventure video game

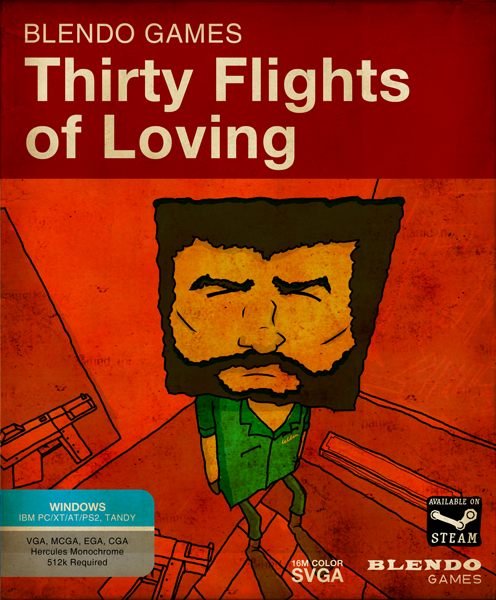
- Developer: Blendo Games
- Publisher: Blendo Games
- Designer: Brendon Chung
- Composer: Chris Remo
- Engine: Quake II engine
- Platforms: Windows, OS X, Linux
- Release: August 20, 2012: Windows; November 2012: Mac; December 7, 2021: Linux
- Genre: Adventure
- Mode: Single-player

Thirty Flights of Loving is an adventure video game developed by Brendon Chung under the name Blendo Games. It was published in August 2012 for Microsoft Windows, in November 2012 for OS X, and in December 2021 for Linux. The game is an indirect sequel to Gravity Bone (2008), with the same unnamed spy as the main character. It follows three people as they prepare for an alcohol heist and the aftermath of the operation.

Thirty Flights of Loving was developed as part of the Kickstarter campaign for the revival of the Idle Thumbs podcast and included a free copy of its predecessor. The first-person game employs a modified version of id Software's 1997-era Quake II engine and incorporates music composed by Idle Thumbs member Chris Remo. It received generally favorable reviews from video game media outlets, scoring 88 out of 100 on aggregate website Metacritic. A follow-up, Quadrilateral Cowboy, was released on July 25, 2016.

== Gameplay ==
Thirty Flights of Loving is an adventure video game that is estimated to take about 15 minutes on average to complete. Using the WASD keys and mouse, the player controls the main character, an unnamed spy who participates in an alcohol-smuggling operation. The player works alongside non-playable characters Anita, a demolitions expert, and Borges, a forger. The first-person game follows the group as they prepare for a heist and experience its aftermath. The robbery is omitted from the game, although it is revealed that it went wrong.

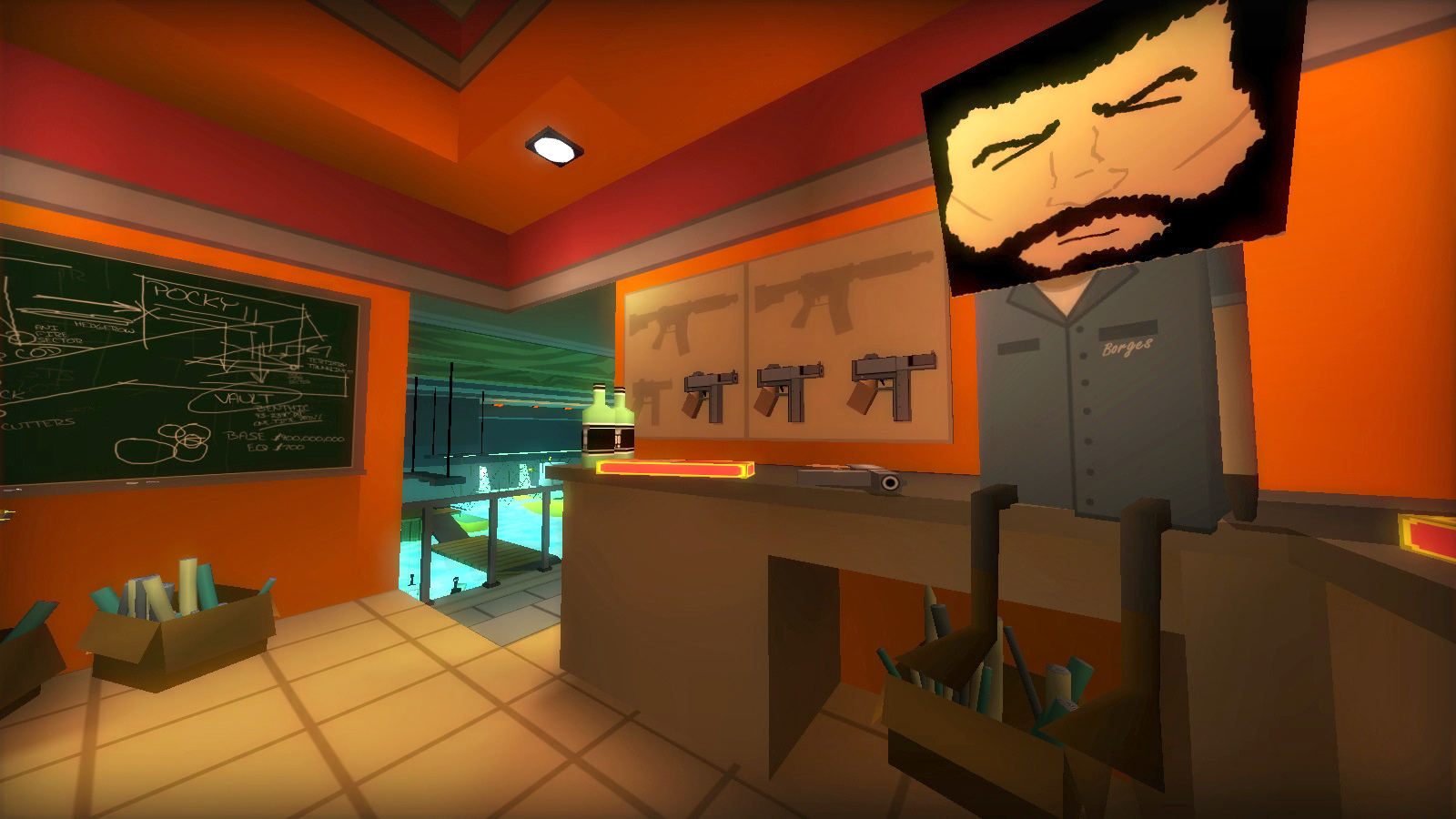
Thirty Flights uses the same blocky style of art as Gravity Bone. Here, the player and Borges are in their hideout, planning the heist.

Unlike Gravity Bone, Thirty Flights of Loving employs non-linear storytelling, forcing the player to piece together the narrative. During gameplay, objectives and guidance are provided through the player's interactions with objects. The player has little control over the game mechanics and is only able to move freely and pick up objects as needed to progress. Several optional actions, such as drinking alcohol, are available at several stages of the game.

=== Story ===
Thirty Flights of Loving begins with the player walking through a small corridor where individual gameplay elements such as movement and key allocations are explained. After walking through a bar and several more corridors, Anita and Borges are introduced. All three characters then exit on a plane. A smash cut skips the narrative forward to a scene with Anita and Borges lying shot in a room full of crates. The player character lifts Borges and takes him outside to what looks to be an airport. The player is then taken to a dark room with Anita sitting on a chair, peeling and eating oranges. After walking through another corridor, Anita, Borges, and the player join a wedding.

Anita and the player get drunk on a table while the rest of the characters start dancing and flying across the room. Then the player is taken again to the room where Anita was peeling oranges, and then back to the room where both she and Borges were lying shot. The player is then shown leaving the airport carrying Borges on a luggage cart. They arrive at a small place where the gunfight sequence takes place, followed by the motorcycle ride sequence, which ends with a crash that leads the player into a museum. In this area, there are several plaques showing the game's name and credits. The player leaves the area and goes into a new one where Bernoulli's principle about low and high air pressures is explained. Then, the player is again moved to the motorcycle sequence, where the game ends.

== Development ==
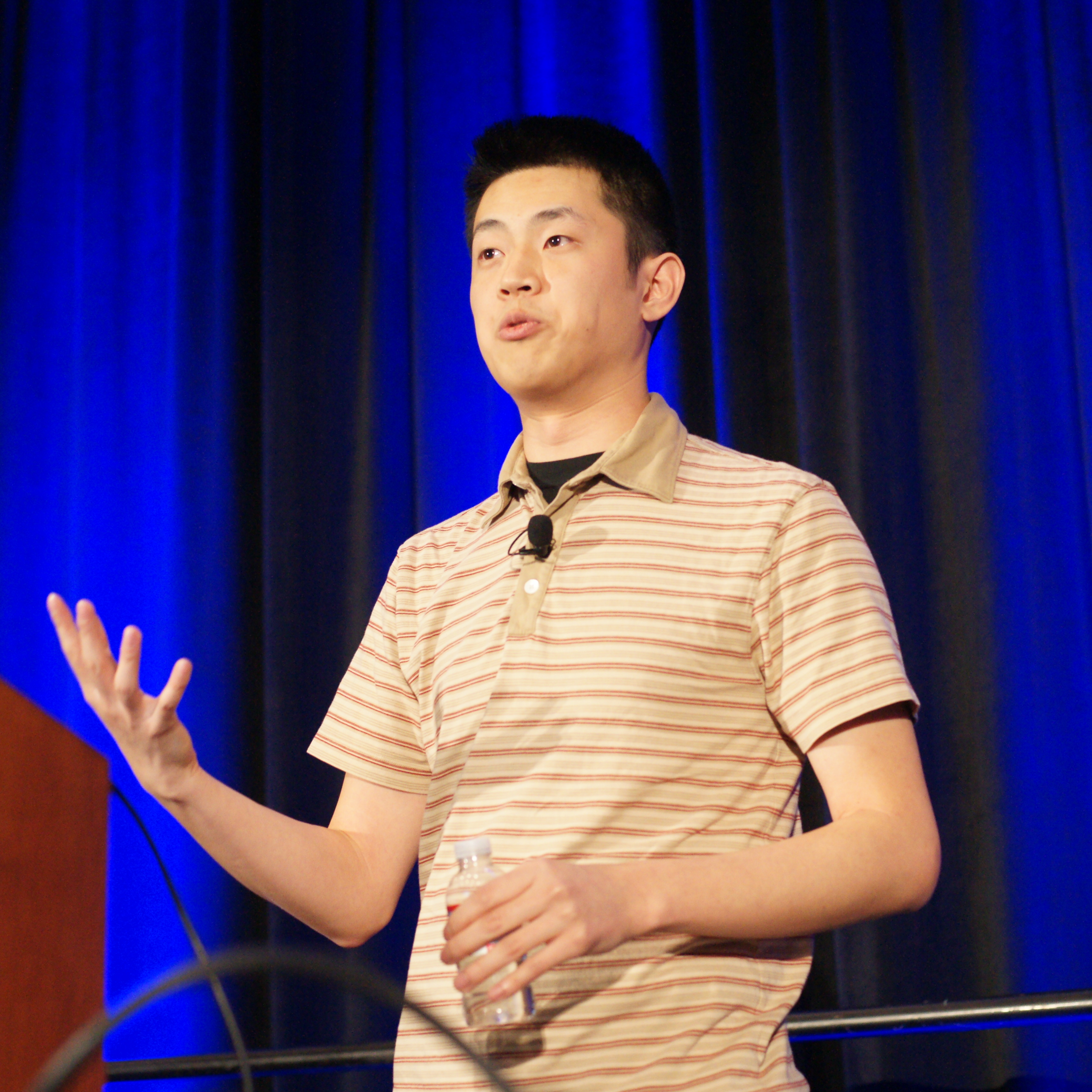
Brendon Chung, developer of Thirty Flights of Loving

Thirty Flights of Loving was developed by Brendon Chung's video game studio Blendo Games. Chung, who worked as a level designer for Pandemic Studios, has contributed to the development of Full Spectrum Warrior and The Lord of the Rings: Conquest. Thirty Flights of Loving was created using a modified version of KMQuake II, a port of id Software's Quake II engine. It incorporates a gameplay enhancement add-on named Lazarus, developed by David Hyde and Mad Dog. Chung acknowledged that although he has worked with newer, "powerful and flexible" engines, he preferred the older engine because it was released as an open-source platform, "so you can redistribute it for free." The source code of Thirty Flights of Loving itself has been released under version 2 of the GNU General Public License, making it free software.

The game was first conceived as a prototype to Gravity Bone, and was scrapped because it was "too dialogue heavy." However, Chung revived the idea after being contacted by Idle Thumbs to develop a game for their Kickstarter campaign. The main development phase, in which content creation took place, was finished within three months. Several more months were spent polishing the game and fixing software bugs. Chung brought multiple existing assets from Gravity Bone to develop Thirty Flights of Loving, and used a diverse set of tools to create the elements of the game. Blender was picked for the creation of models, while Audacity and Adobe Photoshop were used for audio and texture work. Another tool, GtkRadiant, was used to create the game's levels.

Chung developed Thirty Flights of Loving's environment as a way to present the criminal nature of the group. He intentionally avoided the use of voice-overs, and instead modeled the environment to bridge "the disconnect between the player's knowledge and the player's character's knowledge." Characters Anita and Borges were to be introduced using dialogue, but this was removed. However, montages were later added after Idle Thumbs' crew expressed concerns that the characters' relationships were unclear. Chung included a system to automate the generation of non-playable characters to replace the process of manually scripting every person in the game. He explained that although it allows characters to "randomly wander near waypoints," the software is "occasionally glitchy and behaves badly around staircases." This automation code was originally developed for a surveillance game prototype "that never panned out."

A first-person meal simulator was designed for Thirty Flights of Loving. The sequence included the main characters "enjoy[ing] street noodles." However, the idea was scrapped and replaced with the motorcycle ride featured in the final version. The gunfight scene portrayed in the game was supposed to have a "musical rhythm," inspired by the films Koyaanisqatsi and Baraka. The last level of the game is modeled from the French National Museum of Natural History. Chung explained that when developing levels, he first spends time researching and "learning how things work." He elaborated that researching is important in "how it gives specificity and grounding" to a game. Thirty Flights of Loving is the seventh "Citizen Abel" game developed by Chung. The first two games were coded in 1999, while the following three were written between 2000 and 2004. The sixth game in the series, Gravity Bone (2008), became the first to be published. On the Tone Control podcast, he spoke about how every game he has produced, including Thirty Flights of Loving, takes place in the same shared universe.

Thirty Flights of Loving includes references and Easter eggs, as did Gravity Bone. Films such as Three Days of the Condor and The Conversation, film directors Steven Soderbergh and Quentin Tarantino, games such as Zork and Saints Row: The Third, and animated shows like Animaniacs and TaleSpin are referenced in the campaign. Unlike most of Chung's previous games, Thirty Flights of Loving was not framed around a certain musical composition. It incorporates music composed by Idle Thumbs member Chris Remo, while additional audio was provided by Jared Emerson-Johnson and A.J. LoCascio. It makes use of Soundsnap's sound library.

== Release ==
Thirty Flights of Loving was announced in February 2012 as part of the Kickstarter campaign for Idle Thumbs' podcast. The Idle Thumbs team talked to Chung about a possible sequel to Gravity Bone, which was offered as one of the rewards of their Kickstarter campaign. Those who supported the campaign received Thirty Flights of Loving before its official release in August 2012. They also gained access to an exclusive "Goldblum mode" that was not part of the general release. It replaced the character model with ones resembling actor Jeff Goldblum. The game, alongside a free copy of Gravity Bone, was made available to early supporters in July 2012 and to the general public a month later via Steam. An OS X release followed in November 2012, with a Linux version following in December 2021.

== Reception ==
Reception

Aggregate score
Aggregator	Score
Metacritic	88/100

Review scores
Publication	Score
Destructoid	9.5/10
Edge	9/10
Eurogamer	9/10
IGN	8/10

Thirty Flights of Loving received generally favorable reviews upon release. On Metacritic, which assigns a normalized rating out of 100 to reviews from mainstream critics, the game received an average score of 88 out of 100, based on 10 reviews. Destructoid's Patrick Hancock awarded the game 9.5 out of 10, stating that "you'll never look at linear storytelling the same way again."

GameSpot's Carolyn Petit wrote that "the pleasure of Thirty Flights of Loving emerges from the things left unshown", allowing the player to infer and imagine the events, such as the heist itself, that are not otherwise shown. Graham Smith of PC Gamer extolled the minimalist storytelling, asserting that Thirty Flights of Loving "tells a better story in 13 minutes than most games do in 13 hours". Mark Brown from Wired UK classified the game as a "brassy, super-short, cubic heist drama," and stated that Chung "spins a memorable yarn, delivers it with confidence and panache [...] with a 15-year-old engine, without voice acting, in 20 minutes."

IGN's Nathan Meunier said the game "gets off to a fascinating start before completely throwing any and all expectations you might form during its first few minutes into the wood chipper." British video game magazine Edge found Thirty Flights of Loving to be "an intriguing psychological thriller that feels like Wes Anderson taking on Hitchcock." The magazine added that the game had a "wonderfully ambiguous" story, crafted by replacing dialogue with "artful framing and shrewd gestures, and booting out cutscenes in favour of prickly jump-cuts." Thirty Flights of Loving was a Narrative Award finalist at the 2013 Independent Games Festival. However, Richard Hofmeier's Cart Life (2011) became the winner.

== Sequel ==
A follow-up to Thirty Flights of Loving, Quadrilateral Cowboy, was developed by Chung. The game takes place in the same universe as Gravity Bone and Thirty Flights of Loving but is not a direct sequel. It follows a hacker who oversees agents who infiltrate buildings and steal documents. Unlike its predecessors, Quadrilateral Cowboy uses id Software's id Tech 4 engine—originally used for Doom 3. According to Chung, the new engine provides "a lot more modern functionality" than the earlier engine used in the first two games.
