= Alive 4-Ever Returns =

2010 video game

- Developer(s): Meridian Digital Entertainment
- Publisher(s): Meridian Digital Entertainment
- Platform(s): iOS
- Release: April 27, 2010
- Genre(s): Shooter
- Mode(s): Single-player, multiplayer

Alive 4-Ever Returns (stylized as Alive 4-Ever RETURNS) is a shooter game developed and published by Hong Kong studio Meridian Digital Entertainment for iOS in 2010. It is the sequel to the 2009 game Alive 4-Ever.

Alive 4-Ever Returns, like its predecessor, involves the player shooting enemies.

== Reception ==
Reception

Aggregate score
Aggregator	Score
Metacritic	82/100

Review scores
Publication	Score
4Players	81%
GamePro	4.5/5 stars
Pocket Gamer	3.5/5 stars
TouchArcade	4/5 stars

The game received "favorable" reviews according to the review aggregation website Metacritic.
