= Zafehouse: Diaries =

2012 video game

- Developer: Screwfly Studios
- Publisher: Screwfly Studios
- Platform: Windows
- Release: September 28, 2012
- Genre: Strategy
- Mode: Single-player

Zafehouse: Diaries is a turn-based strategy video game in which the player must guide the survivors of a zombie apocalypse to safety. It was released in September 2012 by the Australian independent developer Screwfly Studios, a start-up company formed by two former magazine editors.

== Gameplay ==
Zafehouse: Diaries is a turn-based strategy video game. The player's primary emphasis is on guiding survivors of a zombie apocalypse to safety. This is achieved by guiding the survivors to a helicopter at a certain point during play or by repairing a car and driving away. The takes place in a town which is randomly generated at the beginning of play. The size of the town and the buildings located within change with each new game.

The game's main screen consists of a map of the town. When the player clicks on a building which contains survivors a clipboard appears on-screen so that the player can issue commands to the survivors.

== Development and release ==
The game was created by Logan Booker and David Kidd, a pair of Australian video game magazine editors who formed Screwfly Studios to produce Zafehouse: Diaries. The initial version of the game, simply titled Zafehouse, was created by Booker, who was an editor of the video game magazine Atomic. Zafehouse took a week to create and was used as the basis of an article on game development published in Atomic. The game features no graphics or animations. Buildings in the game world are represented by buttons and the game is navigated through a series of lists and menus. This game is played over a period of 72 in-game hours, the player progresses one hour at a time. Zafehouse was the product of Booker's interest in the interpersonal relationships of characters in zombie films, such as 28 Days Later, as opposed to the more visceral action games with post-apocalyptic settings.

Despite the simplistic nature of the game's interface, gamers displayed an interest in the project, surprising Booker. This resulted in him enlisting Kidd, a former PC & Tech Authority magazine editor, to help him build a more complicated version of the game.

== Legacy ==
A sequel, Zafehouse Diaries 2, was announced by Screwfly Studios in November 2016. The game was released on Steam in June 2017.

== See also ==
- List of zombie video games
