= Atom Zombie Smasher =

2011 video game

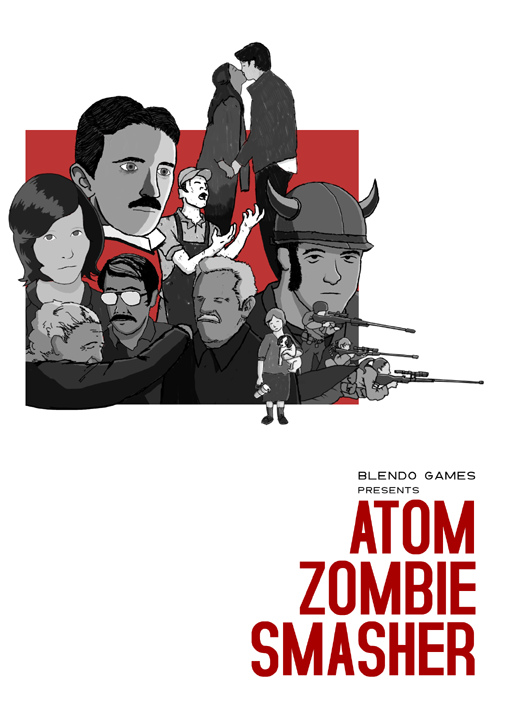
- Developer: Blendo Games
- Engine: SFML, Mono and BlendoEngine
- Platforms: Windows, OS X, Linux
- Release: 22 January 2011
- Genre: Real-time strategy
- Modes: Single-player, multiplayer

Atom Zombie Smasher is a real-time strategy game developed by independent developer Blendo Games. In it, the player attempts to rescue as many citizens as possible from an oncoming zombie horde using helicopter rescue units and an array of military units to protect the citizens and defeat the zombies.

== Gameplay ==
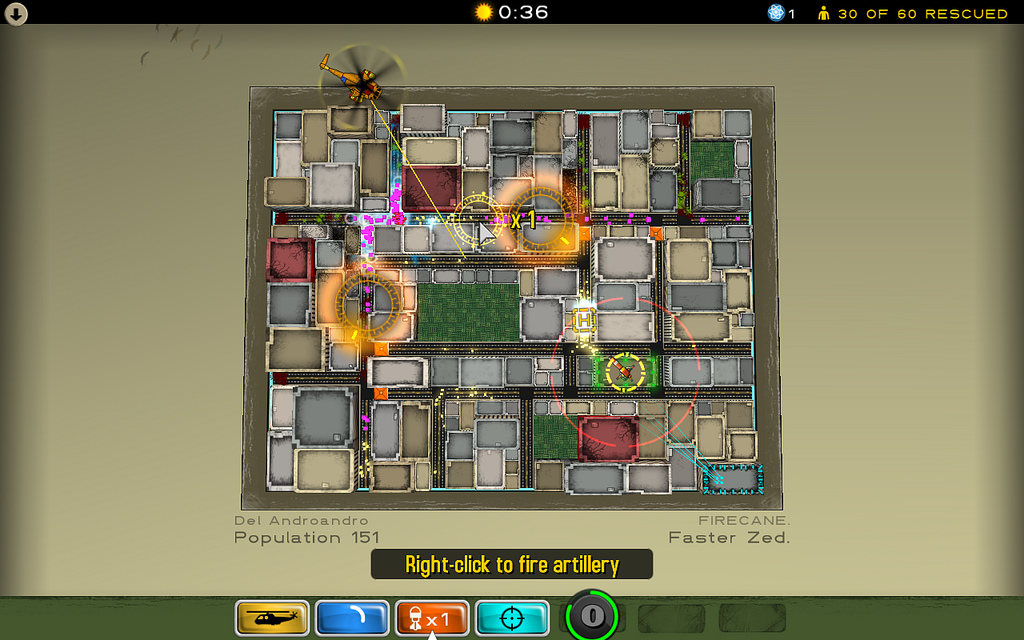

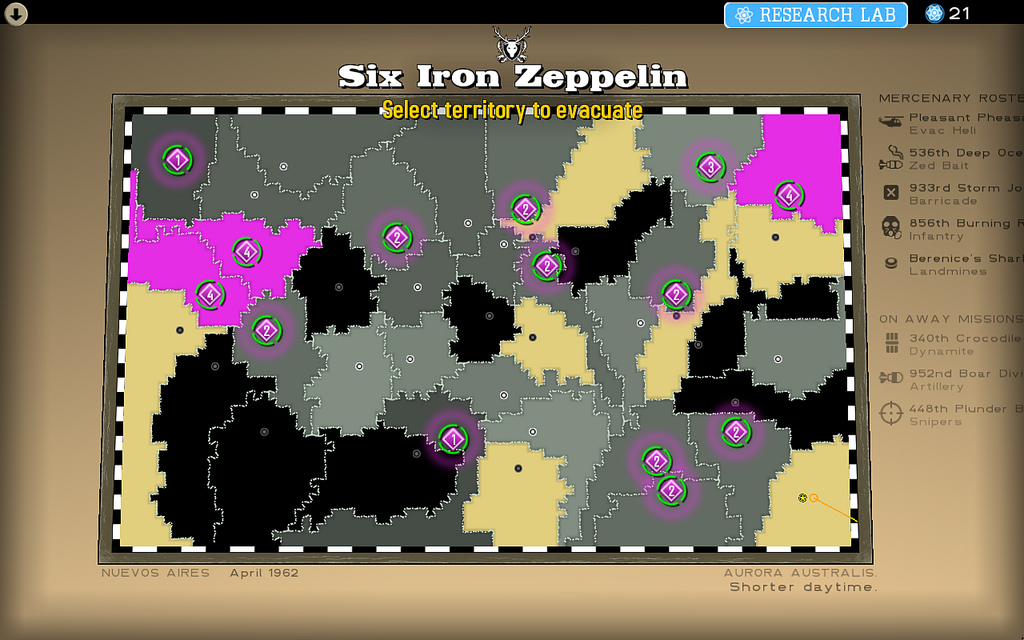
During missions (top), the players must try to rescue as many civilians as possible using strategically placed military units to protect them from the zombies. On the world map (bottom), the player must choose missions to stop the onslaught of zombies.

The player is responsible for saving as many citizens as possible from the various regions of Nuevos Aires, a large fictional city being invaded by zombies, by deploying and directing a range of military units. The city regions and events in the game are compiled through procedural generation, making each playthrough unique.

On each mission, the player is tasked with rescuing civilians from zombie hordes through helicopter airlifts. Civilians and zombies are represented by colored dots on a top-down map of a region of Nuevos Aires. Prior to starting the mission, the player chooses the airlift rescue zone and places any other military units they have been given. Once the player starts the mission, the game processes in real-time; Zombies will start to flood in from the sides of the map; any civilians touched by a zombie become zombies themselves, and as day progresses into night, zombies will start to appear in increasing numbers, emphasizing the need to rescue civilians in an efficient manner. Certain military units can be re-positioned or reoriented at this time, as well as activating certain abilities such as mortar fire or zombie lures. The player must rescue a minimum number of civilians on each map to win that mission; failing to do so allows the player to retry that mission or forfeit the territory but move onto the next mission.

Regardless of whether the player wins or accepts defeat on a mission, this will affect the larger world map, which displays the entire city divided up into territories. If the player is able to destroy all the zombies before nightfall, the territory comes under the control of the player and zombies cannot retake it. If the player fails to rescue enough civilians, the territory falls under zombie control and is considered lost. Winning a mission may also unlock one of several military units that can be used on future missions. Military units gain experience from missions, rescues and kills, this experience can be used to upgrade their effectiveness, such as increasing the frequency of helicopter rescues.

The game also features a "Victory Track", where after each mission both the player and zombie side are awarded points based on mission performance and the number of territories controlled. As each side passes certain scoring milestones, they gain new abilities. Between missions new zombie outbreaks are randomly generated in the city, potentially increasing the size of the zombie horde already there. If an area achieves too large of a zombie outbreak, it will spread to adjoining regions. At this point, the player has the opportunity to select the next mission, and is given a random assortment of their current military units to select from to bring into that mission. The ultimate goal of the player is to achieve a target score on the world map before the zombie side achieves theirs, or eradicate the zombie side altogether.

== Development ==
Atom Zombie Smasher is based on Simple and Fast Multimedia Library. Brendon Chung, the sole developer behind Blendo Games, stated that development of Atom Zombie Smasher took about seven months of full-time work following a few months of prototyping. Chung's goal was to make a game where, in the process of winning the game, the player would have to make sacrificial choices; the scenario of a zombie attack on a populated city fit this concept well. In the creation of Atom Zombie Smasher, Chung's focus was on procedural generation, including the layout of the city and each zone, the events that affected the larger game, and what resources would be available to the player. He desired to avoid any detailed modeling of the people, and found that his original simple dot representation during development was sufficient, with players able to easily surmise what the humans and zombies were doing at a glance.

== Reception ==
Atom Zombie Smasher

Aggregate scores
Aggregator	Score
GameRankings	77%
Metacritic	(PC) 74

Review scores
Publication	Score
Eurogamer	7/10
IGN	(PC) 7.5/10

Rock, Paper, Shotgun gave a positive review, noting how the game felt "fresh and clever and oh-so-PC-gaming-in-2011: no rules but its own". Edge considered the overall game a "wonderful urban chaos laboratory to muddle around inside" and a good reason why "we did need one more zombie game after all".

Atom Zombie Smasher was one of ten independently developed games that was featured at the 2011 Penny Arcade Expo. The game was also added to the third Humble Indie Bundle midway through its sale. Gamasutra named the title the 10th best indie game and their fourth best PC-exclusive game of 2011. The title was named as one of finalists for the "Excellence in Design" award for the 2012 Independent Games Festival, and one of ten finalists for the 2012 Indie Game Challenge by the Academy of Interactive Arts & Sciences.

At the 2012 Game Developers Conference Chung revealed that outside of the Humble Indie Bundle, he has sold nearly 100,000 copies of the game through December 2011, with more than 95% of the sales through the Steam software platform.
