= Pro Zombie Soccer =

2010 video game

- Developer(s): Super Awesome Hyper Dimensional Mega Team
- Publisher(s): Chillingo
- Platform(s): Android, iOS
- Release: 2010
- Genre(s): Sports
- Mode(s): Single-player

Pro Zombie Soccer is a 2010 soccer video game developed by the British studio Super Awesome Hyper Dimensional Mega Team and published by Chillingo.

== Plot and gameplay ==
In Pro Zombie Soccer, the player controls the protagonist named Jax, a wannabe soccer star who is infected as a result of a zombie bite, from a soccer-playing zombie named Julinho from SC Marcelona. Players must quickly defeat hordes of zombies before Jax succumbs to the effects of the zombie infection.

== Reception ==
On Metacritic, the game has a "generally favorable" rating of 86% based on 11 critics.

Multiple critics gave positive reviews.

== Apocalypse Edition ==
Pro Zombie Soccer Apocalypse Edition was released on 20 January 2011 for iPad. Advertised feature improvements included HD graphics, iPad-exclusive levels, social gaming support, re-designed levels and backgrounds, and new unlockable modes.
