= Voodoo Kid =

1997 video game

- Publisher: Infogrames
- Designers: Eric Sterling Collins; Hubert Chardot
- Platforms: Microsoft Windows; Mac OS X; Linux
- Release: 1997: Windows; EU: 1997; WW: 15 April 1998; Mac; WW: 20 April 2021 Linux; WW: September 2021
- Genre: Adventure
- Mode: Single-player

VooDoo Kid is a 1997 video game developed and published by Infogrames for Microsoft Windows. It is a horror-themed adventure video game targeted at younger players. The game was republished by Digital Theory for Windows, Macintosh, and Linux in 2021.

== Plot ==
The unnamed protagonist (who can be chosen to be either a boy or a girl) is magically transported aboard a haunted ship where the player must make his or her way through the vessel and confront Captain Baron Saturday. The protagonist wakes up in the hold of the ship where they meet Baron Saturday's zombie butler. After the protagonist helps him find Baron Saturday's hat, the butler decides that the protagonist could potentially free the souls captured by the Baron and free the crew. To do so the protagonist needs to assemble the map, which will allow him/her to direct the ship to the land of the living, instead of the island of lost souls, where the Baron is currently sailing. The protagonist proceeds from the hold of the ship to the infirmary, then the kitchen, then the dining room, and finally the deck. Along the way he/she collects the entire map and escapes elemental traps set by the baron by using several loa which turns the protagonist into a spirit like form which he/she uses to deactivate the trap. After changing the course of the ship, the butler reveals that the Baron controls the ship telepathically, and the protagonist has to defeat the Baron to change the course. The protagonist climbs up the mast and frees the souls the Baron has captured before confronting the Baron. The protagonist manages to defeat the Baron using knowledge of the elements. The protagonist then wakes up, the whole adventure seemingly a dream, before the voodoo container of souls the Baron used appears as a reward for the protagonist's bravery.

== Development ==
VooDoo Kid was originally announced by Infogrames for Microsoft Windows and PlayStation at the Milia trade show in Cannes in February 1997. The game took inspiration from Afro-American religions including Candomblé and Voodoo for its theme. Motion capture was used to represent the characters. In 2021, Digital Theory re-released the title on Steam and GOG.com digital distribution platforms for Windows, Macintosh and Linux.

== Reception ==
Reception

Review scores
Publication	Score
PC PowerPlay	79%
Cyber.net	80%
Hacker	90%
PC Action	67%
PC Player	3/5
Reset	8/10
Power Unlimited	59%
Secret Service	7/10

Several critics compared the game to Alone in the Dark.
