= Alive 4-Ever =

2009 video game

- Developer: Meridian Digital Entertainment
- Platform: iOS
- Release: August 26, 2009

Alive 4-Ever is a video game for iOS developed by Hong Kong studio Meridian Digital Entertainment. Players control one of the last human survivors of a worldwide zombie outbreak.

== Gameplay ==
The game has been described as Left 4 Dead for iOS, with players able to move their character and fire weapons independently. In addition to surviving waves of zombie attacks, the player must complete objectives such as defeating a fixed number of zombies or rescuing survivors and escorting them to an extraction zone. Medicine for healing, ammunition for weapons and money are scattered throughout the game's levels. Money is used to upgrade the sixteen different weapons available to players.

Four players can play the game via Bluetooth, allowing them to coordinate an assault on the undead. Four characters are available for play, each having unique strengths and weaknesses, characters can be improved by spending the experience points accrued during levels.

== Reception ==
Reception

Aggregate score
Aggregator	Score
GameRankings	93%

Review scores
Publication	Score
GameSpot	9/10
Macworld	4.5/5
Pocket Gamer	4.5/5
TouchArcade	4.5/5

The game received universal acclaim according to the review aggregation website GameRankings. Spanner Spencer of Pocket Gamer praised the game overall, but stated, "The focus on multiplayer means the single player game suffers from a frustrating and often insurmountable level of chaos." Despite this, he added, "It's hard to criticise an action game for being too action-packed, particularly given its strong command of the genre." GameSpot's Andrew Podolsky was also very positive, stating, "The game has pretty much everything you'd want in an iDevice action game where you're fighting off an army of zombies."

== Sequel ==
A sequel called Alive 4-Ever RETURNS was released for iOS on April 27, 2010.
