= Gravity Bone =

2008 adventure video game

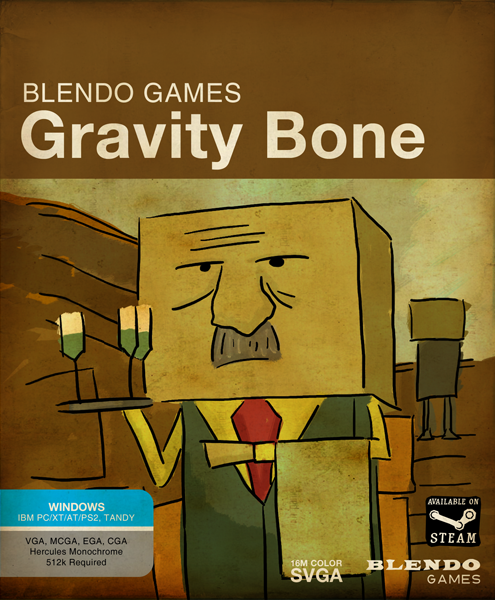
- Developer: Blendo Games
- Publisher: Blendo Games
- Designer: Brendon Chung
- Composer: Xavier Cugat
- Engine: Quake II engine
- Platform: Microsoft Windows
- Release: WW: August 28, 2008
- Genre: Adventure
- Mode: Single-player

Gravity Bone is a 2008 adventure game developed and published by Blendo Games. The freeware game employs a modified version of id Software's Quake II engine and incorporates music from films by director Wong Kar-wai, which were originally performed by Xavier Cugat. Four incarnations of it were produced during its one-year development; the first featured more common first-person shooter elements than the released version. Subsequent versions shifted in a new direction, with the inclusion of more spy-oriented gameplay. It was released for Microsoft Windows in August 2008.

Gravity Bone received critical acclaim from video game journalists. It was called "a pleasure to experience" by Charles Onyett from IGN, and received comparisons to games such as Team Fortress 2 and Portal. It was praised for its cohesive story, atmosphere and its ability to catch the player's interest over a very short time span without feeling rushed or incomplete. It received the "Best Arthouse Game" award in Game Tunnel's Special Awards of 2008. A sequel, Thirty Flights of Loving, was released in 2012.

== Gameplay ==
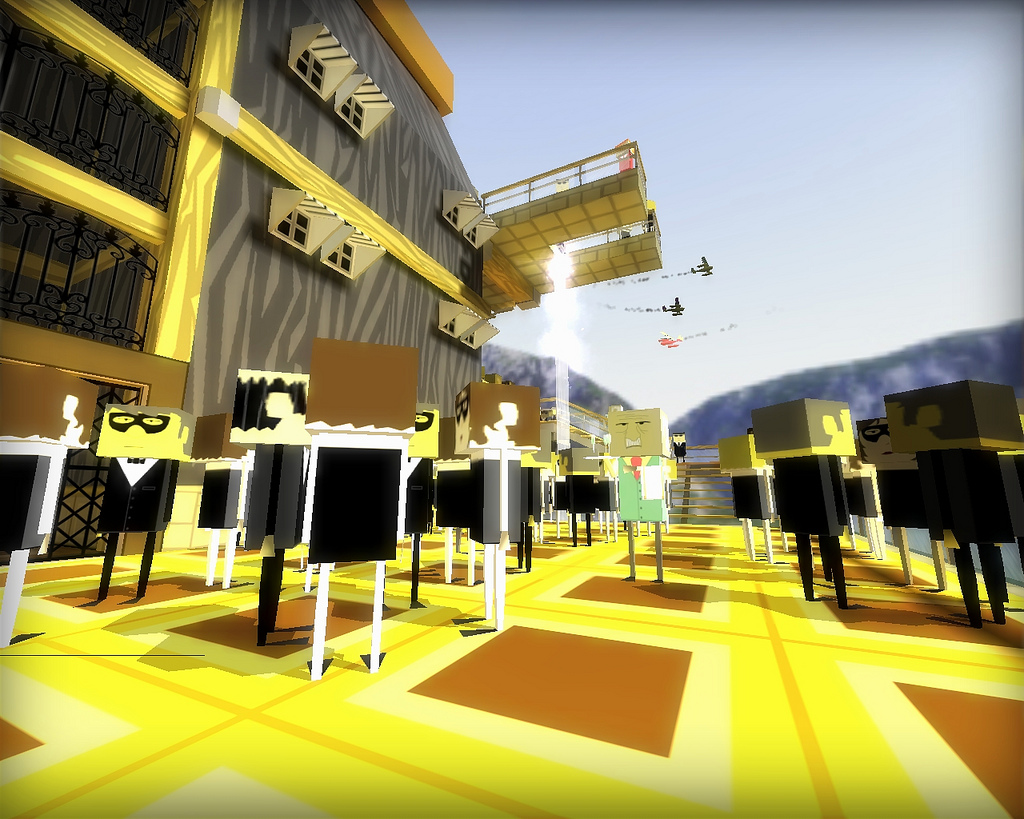
Gravity Bone uses an interface with no heads-up display and provides all objectives and guidance through interactions with objects and environments.

Gravity Bone is an adventure video game that lasts around 20 minutes. It is a first-person game set in the fictional city of Nuevos Aires. The player controls an unnamed spy, and is tasked with accomplishing several missions across its two stages. At the end of it, the player-controlled spy is killed by an unknown woman after chasing her through the last half of the second level. It was designed to leave the player without a clear idea of how its story evolves.

During these missions, objectives and guidance are provided through the player's interactions with objects and environments. The tutorial system used to demonstrate routine gameplay elements such as object interaction and movement is disguised as the first level of Gravity Bone. Here, the player is tasked with the delivery of a contaminated drink to an unspecified non-player character. After the first level is completed, the player is sent to the second level, which follows the pattern of the first; the player is assigned a set of actions and goals involving platforming sequences.

== Development ==
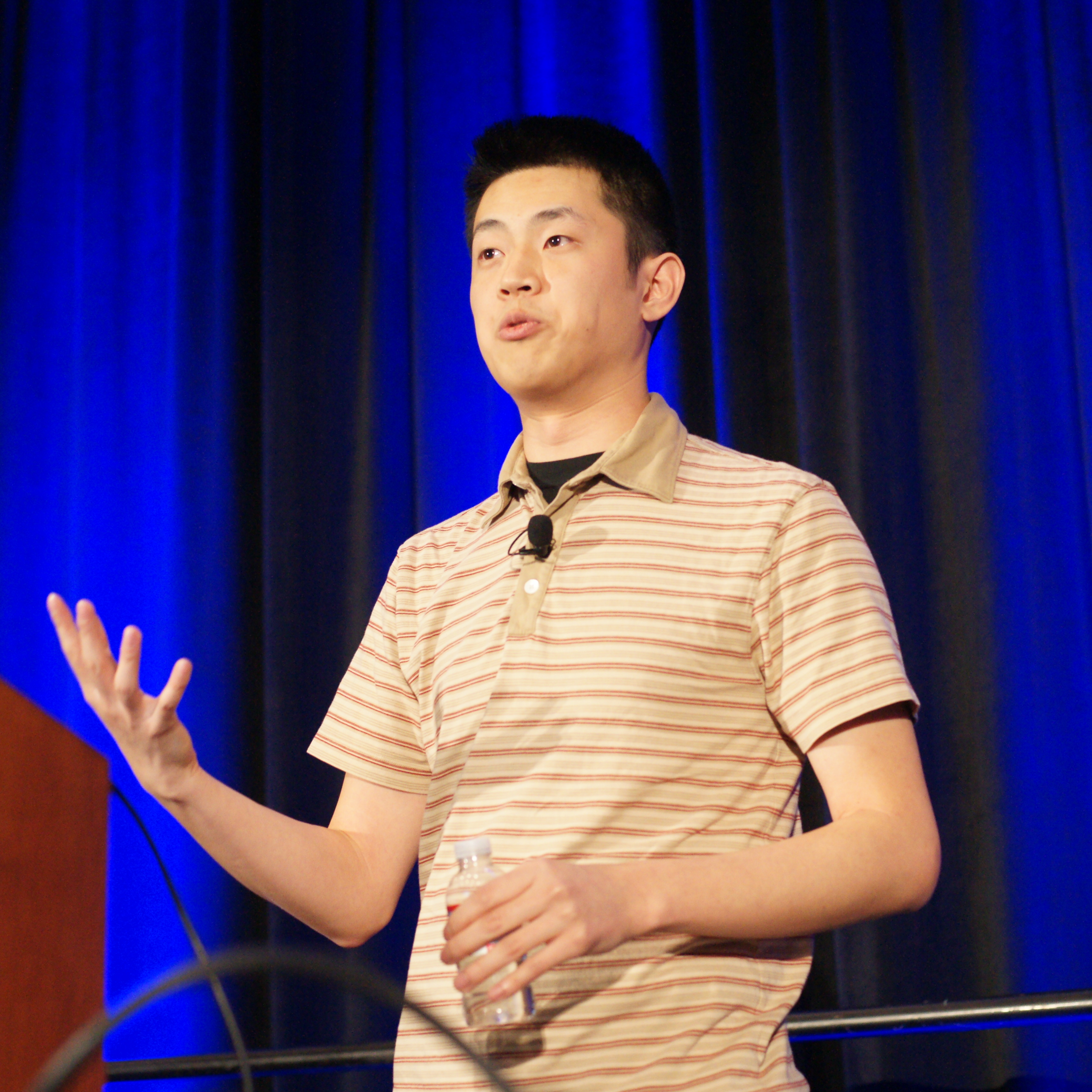
Brendon Chung, developer of Gravity Bone, revealed that several versions were made during one year of development.

Gravity Bone was developed by Brendon Chung under his video game studio Blendo Games. Chung, who worked as a level designer for Pandemic Studios, has contributed to the development of titles such as Full Spectrum Warrior and The Lord of the Rings: Conquest. Four incarnations of Gravity Bone were produced during its one-year development. Chung commented during an interview with FidGit that "Gravity Bone started out very different from what it was and ended up getting scrapped ... so on and so forth until this version came out." The first version of Gravity Bone featured more typical first-person shooter elements than the released version, and was based on a series of Quake 2 maps entitled Citizen Abel. He elaborated that the first version had the player running around with a gun, "shoot[ing] things and stuff explodes." Development shifted in a new direction, and Gravity Bone was transformed; the player would act as a computer hacker, "hacking stuff all the time."

Most of the original first-person shooter elements were removed by the third revision, which incorporated a more spy-oriented style of gameplay, with the player "trying to quietly take out enemies and not be seen." Chung commented that he reworked it several more times to fit his vision: "It kept on just changing and changing and changing until it got into a more story-oriented direction." He stated that he did not feel comfortable developing Gravity Bone as a first-person shooter game, and kept adding "bits and bits of more and more unconventional" elements as a result. He explained that he "got stuck on this idea of the hero never fires a gun, but he just has a bunch of tools on his belt, like a power drill or a can of pressurized Freon, a screwdriver. I thought that was kind of funny and interesting."

Gravity Bone was developed using a modified version of id Software's id Tech 2, the graphics engine for Quake 2. Chung acknowledged that although he has worked with newer, "powerful and flexible" engines, he preferred the older engine because it was released as an open source platform, "so you can redistribute it for free." The voice work featured in the briefings in Gravity Bone was produced using text-to-speech programs, and it incorporates three songs by Xavier Cugat and His Orchesetra: "Maria Elena", "Brazil", and "Perfidia". These versions of "Maria Elena" and "Perfidia" were both previously used by film director Wong Kar-wai in the 1990 film Days of Being Wild. Chung declared that his passion for Wong's films were an important factor in the selection of Wong's music: "He makes these really beautiful films and I've always wanted to use the same music in a videogame." He said that Wong's films had a strong influence on the development.

== Reception ==
Charles Onyett from IGN applauded Gravity Bone, saying that it is "a game that appears to toy with the notions of heroism and villainy, and the ways the player identifies with, and is directed toward, both roles." He praised all aspects of it, commenting, "the cohesiveness of its striking visual presentation, soundtrack and effects, and almost entirely incomprehensible story combine to create an atmosphere of peculiar strength." Onyett concluded his preview by stating, "it's a pleasure to experience, and never ceases to delight and surprise over its short run." Anthony Burch from Destructoid gave a positive review, stating that it "is so stylistically unified, so consistently cool and weird and imaginative, that it's damn near impossible not to fall in love with—even as it ends and you're wondering what the hell happened, and why." He also applauded several technical and design aspects, expressing appreciation for its "stylistic choices", as well as the "nigh unbelievable" bloom effects featured. Burch concluded that Gravity Bone is "a great ride", and that the "atmosphere and style alone will barrel you through to the journey's end, which comes all too soon."

Derek Yu from The Indie Games Source compared it with Portal and stated that Chung was able to develop "an impeccable flair for graphic design" while manufacturing Gravity Bone. He concluded that it is "bursting with delicious color, and features blocky-headed characters that are infinitely more interesting to look at and interact with than the frightening Realdolls game players are often forced to contend with in modern FPS's." Yu elaborated that it had "enough panache in its two levels to make it somewhat of an indie sleeper hit of the end of 2008." An editor from The Refined Geek was pleased with Gravity Bone and its sequel, Thirty Flights of Loving, awarding them each a score of 8 out of 10 and stating, "the enjoyment from these games comes from noticing all the subtle environmental clues and then using your imagination to draw the connecting dots." The editor commented that both games highlight story elements over graphics and technical innovations, saying each game's "true strength comes from its ability to tell a story in the extremely short time frame."

Kirk Hamilton of Kotaku praised its writing, "if you own a PC, you owe it to yourself to play Gravity Bone." He said it was "one of the coolest things I've played on PC lately." Kieron Gillen from Rock, Paper, Shotgun considered Gravity Bone to be an intellectual mix of Hitman, No-one Lives Forever, and Team Fortress 2, stating that it is the "wittiest game" he has played since World of Goo. Gillen applauded every aspect, stating that Gravity Bone was an "indie art game whose main effect is to delight you at every turn." It received the "Best Arthouse Game" award in Game Tunnel's Special Awards of 2008.

== Sequel ==
A sequel to Gravity Bone, Thirty Flights of Loving, was announced as a reward for contributing to the Idle Thumbs podcast revival Kickstarter. It was released to Kickstarter backers in July 2012, and later offered as a purchasable title on Steam, which included Gravity Bone as an additional feature. It, though not a direct sequel in story to Gravity Bone, follows the main character in a heist with two other characters that goes very wrong. The title was critically acclaimed by reviewers, who called the very short but non-linear storytelling of Thirty Flights a novel use of the video game medium.
