= The Lord of the Rings: Conquest =

2009 video game

- Developer: Pandemic Studios (Note: Additional development of the Nintendo DS version by Artificial Mind & Movement.)
- Publisher: Electronic Arts
- Director: Eric Gewirtz
- Designer: Sean Soucy
- Platforms: Microsoft Windows; PlayStation 3 Xbox 360; Nintendo DS
- Release: NA: January 13, 2009; AU: January 15, 2009; EU: January 16, 2009
- Genre: Action
- Modes: Single-player, multiplayer

The Lord of the Rings: Conquest is a 2009 action game developed by Pandemic Studios and published by Electronic Arts. It is derived from The Lord of the Rings film trilogy, and borrows many gameplay mechanics from Pandemic's Star Wars: Battlefront games. The game allows the player to play as both the forces of good and evil.

Pandemic was aided by Weta Digital in developing the game. They provided many of their digital models, including the fell beasts. Pandemic used elements that were cut from the films, and have taken inspiration from J. R. R. Tolkien's original fantasy series, such as a level based loosely around Balin's conquest of Moria, in which Gimli attempts to retake the dwarven city from the orcs. Some inspiration was less direct: the armies of Rohan and Gondor decide not to attack Minas Morgul in the novel, but a level in the game is based on what might possibly have happened if they had. The game uses Howard Shore's score to the films as its soundtrack.

The Lord of the Rings: Conquest received mixed reviews, with criticism focusing on its combat, graphics, voice acting, balance issues, artificial intelligence, bugs, and multiplayer.

== Gameplay ==
Players have the ability to ride animal mounts and slay large enemies, such as the Oliphaunt

The player takes the role of a soldier of Rohan, Gondor, Rivendell, Harad, Mordor or Isengard, depending on the campaign or side the player chooses. The game is generally objective based, requiring the player to defeat a certain number of enemies, or hold a position until a timer runs out. If a soldier dies, the game continues from the point of death and the death has no impact on the storyline or flow of the game. However, players have a certain number of lives and must repeat the entire level if their lives run out.

In the War of the Ring campaign, containing eight levels, the player loosely follows the major battles of the films with some additions such as the Mines of Moria and Minas Morgul. In the Rise of Sauron campaign, the player controls the forces of Sauron in a reworking of the storyline set over seven levels of a film called The final war for Middle Earth. In this story, the Dark Lord reclaims the ring which Frodo Baggins is corrupted by and fails to destroy. The hobbit is then killed by the Witchking of Angmar, leading to Sauron subsequently conquering Middle Earth. Both campaigns are narrated by Hugo Weaving, who played Elrond in Peter Jackson's film trilogy.

The game uses a class-based character system, similar to the system found in Pandemic's previous game Star Wars: Battlefront. There are four playable classes. Warriors are a melee combat unit which focus on swordsmanship. Unlike the other classes, whose special attacks recharge over time, warriors can only gain energy by defeating enemies, which allows them to unleash more powerful attacks with a flaming sword. They are the only class that can block or perform counterattacks with special moves. The warrior also has a throwing axe as a secondary, medium ranged weapon. Archers are better suited for long range combat and are equipped with a bow and arrow. Different types of arrows can be equipped: fire arrows, which can knock down enemies and deal explosive damage; poison arrows, which slow enemies down and do damage over time, and the ability to fire a volley of three normal arrows at multiple enemies at once. They also have a kick for use in close-quarters, which knocks back the enemy. They can also hit concealed Scouts with the multiple arrow skill. A headshot will allow the archer to kill most enemies in a single hit.

Scouts are masters in the art of moving unseen. The scout's primary weapons are two daggers, and he has the ability to become temporarily invisible and assassinate units instantly from behind with a sneak attack. As a secondary attack, he carries satchel bombs filled with blasting powder as a ranged attack. Finally, mages serve as the magic class. A mage's primary attack is a bolt of lightning, which can be charged up for a more powerful attack. He also wields a "firewall" attack, which creates an expanding circle of flames that will heavily damage enemies who are within the circle. For close range attacks, they have a shockwave attack, which knocks enemies back. Mages can also heal allies. For defensive purposes, a mage can create a magical shield around himself to protect anyone inside from ranged attacks of any sort.

The player can occasionally gain the opportunity to play as a Troll or an Ent, which are also used by non-player characters and, while far stronger than any normal class, are vulnerable to instantaneous kills by Warriors and Scouts through the use of quick time events. Any class can ride a mount: horses for the Men of the West and wargs and Oliphaunts for Sauron and Saruman's forces. Mounts are useful for quickly traversing large areas, but are highly vulnerable and a single hit against one will result in the player being knocked off (with the exception of the oliphaunt, which has an enormous amount of health). The player wields a sword when mounted, regardless of their class, and is only allowed to use basic attacks. Mounts also have the power to trample enemies when riding at top speed. Depending on the game's settings during multiplayer matches, or during certain periods of the campaign, players will have the opportunity to control heroes, many of whom include the heroes and villains of Lord of the Rings. The heroes are usually based on the four primary class archetypes, controlling very similarly to their standard non-hero counterparts, but are also far more powerful, though not invincible.

=== Nintendo DS game version ===
In the Nintendo DS version, gameplay features are greatly reduced. The Scout class is unavailable and mounts are non-existent. In addition, the playing perspective is isometric and six maps were shipped with the game. All classes start out relatively weak, but fallen enemies will drop orbs that allow the player to power-up their current character's attack power and speed, resetting after the player respawns. After a level is over, a post-game statistics screen will appear to show the player's performance and to award them in-game achievements for their accomplishments (not allowing allies to die, for instance).

== Development and release ==
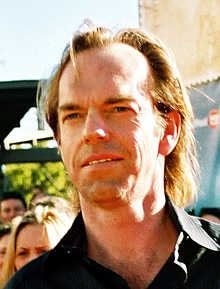
Hugo Weaving reprises his role as Elrond. He is the only original cast member to appear in the game outside of cutscenes

The Lord of the Rings: Conquest was announced on May 8, 2008, for Microsoft Windows, PlayStation 3, and Xbox 360. It was promoted at E3 2008, where the press were able to play a build of the game. It made an appearance at German Games Convention in that same year. Pandemic Studios began by creating the battlefields seen in the Lord of the Rings trilogy, then included additional locales. They cited the films as their primary source of inspiration, but noted that when necessary they took liberties to apply those stories to an action video game. Pandemic sought to create a "hyper real" experience according to Gewirtz. In an example he stated that rather than take Aragorn actor Viggo Mortensen's performance, the character in the game performs moves which Mortensen himself may not have been able to capture. The books were a secondary source of inspiration for locales and battles. In early hands-on demos to the press several features, such as animal mounts, were not yet available. During subsequent demonstrations the press noticed vast improvements, and eventually the inclusion of mounts.

Developers updated their engine to allow for 150 units to be on the battlefield at one time. The game is powered by an upgraded version of Pandemic Studios' Zero engine, and was developed by the same team that worked on the first two Star Wars: Battlefront installments. Conquest director Eric Gewirtz said the team was "throwing around these ideas, and in perfect serendipity, happened to get access to the Lord of the Rings license, and that was just the center for us on making this game." Howard Shore's music, composed for the film trilogy, was used in the game. The film actors reprise their roles in cutscenes, which are archived footage from the film. In-game likenesses are based on their film counterparts. Hugo Weaving reprises his role as Elrond and serves as the game's narrator. All other cast members were replaced by voice doubles. Chris Edgerly voices Aragorn, Crispin Freeman voices Legolas, Martin Jarvis voices the white wizard Gandalf, and Yuri Lowenthal stands in for Elijah Wood as Frodo Baggins.

The game was first released in North America on January 13, 2009, with an Australian release two days later (January 15), and a European release on the following day (January 16). The first downloadable content (DLC) was released on January 29, 2009, for the Xbox 360 and PlayStation 3. It featured two maps for the game mode Hero Arena, which was not in the shipped game due to time constraints. This mode allows for arena-style battles with up to three friends. The maps themselves are merely broken down versions of levels in the campaigns, specifically sections of Osgiliath and Moria. A second pack of downloadable content was released February 26, 2009, on the same platforms which contained three new heroes, Boromir, Arwen and Gothmog, two new maps, Amon Hen and Last Alliance, and two new Hero Arenas, Minas Tirith and Weathertop. On March 16, 2010, just over a year after the game's release, the online multiplayer modes of Conquest were shut down by publisher Electronic Arts.

== Reception ==
Reception

Aggregate score
Aggregator	Score			
Aggregator	DS	PC	PS3	Xbox 360
Metacritic	61/100	57/100	54/100	55/100

Review scores
Publication	Score			
Publication	DS	PC	PS3	Xbox 360
The A.V. Club	N/A	N/A	N/A	D
Eurogamer	N/A	N/A	N/A	5/10
Game Informer	N/A	N/A	4.75/10	4.75/10
GameRevolution	N/A	N/A	C	C
GameSpot	N/A	N/A	6.5/10	6.5/10
GameSpy	N/A	2.5/5	2.5/5	2.5/5
Giant Bomb	N/A	N/A	N/A	2/5
IGN	6.7/10	N/A	(US) 7/10 (UK) 6/10	(US) 7/10 (UK) 6/10
Official Xbox Magazine (US)	N/A	N/A	N/A	4/10

The game received "mixed" reviews on all platforms according to the review aggregation website Metacritic. Critics unfavorably compared the game to Star Wars: Battlefront. IGN UK felt the game "offers much sound and fury but little substance [...] the single-player campaign is rudimentary and brief and the multiplayer modes are fairly few", although complimented the presentation as "[doing] a pretty good job of evoking the rich universe of Middle Earth". Game Informer called the game "a joyless trip through familiar territories, and sadly, nothing more than that".

The game's combat was criticized by reviewers. IGN complained about the "poorly designed" combat as a whole, in that the player can "[slam] buttons and [see] no result". They further criticized it as redundant, stating that all four classes were essentially identical to play as, even between the two separate campaigns, and that heroes were merely "class characters on steroids". GameSpy described it as "lacking [...] So many other games have executed third-person combat in more engaging ways that it's hard to settle for less." Eurogamer also mentioned the movement system as being unrealistic, highlighting that if the player falls from a high position they "won't so much as buckle at the knee".

Balance issues were also commented on. IGN UK found the mage class to be overpowered and The A.V. Club similarly felt that, due to the mage's ability to heal himself, the class was "the correct choice 90 percent of the time". The scout class was also labelled as "a griefer's dream" in multiplayer. Both Game Informer and GameSpy criticized that the player was often unable to defend themselves against an onslaught of enemies, with the latter writing "It's entirely too easy for you to be knocked helpless and killed in an instant, resulting in many moments where you've lost control of your character." Official Xbox Magazine lamented the objectives where the player must hold a position for a certain length of time while being besieged by enemies, a common problem being that, if the player is killed, by the time the player has respawned, the location has been overrun before they have a chance to fight back. Similarly, the lack of mid-level saves or a checkpoint system was also disliked by IGN UK, forcing the player to restart a level if they failed an objective.

The game was criticized for its technical issues, in particular the AI. IGN UK listed glitches such as an enemy boss walking off a cliff and "saving us the bother of having to defeat him in combat". Eurogamer stated that the player's allies were "AI-impoverished", stepping into the player's line of fire "before sauntering off unscathed and oblivious", while Game Informer felt the AI appeared to be "tripping on acid as they stare blankly at walls and sunsets". Game Informer also cited other technical issues, such as the player character being "yanked off of a ledge by a mysterious force" and the game failing to register button-inputs.

The graphics and animations of the game were considered substandard. IGN UK stated that "friend and foe alike blend into one messy brown blur". GameSpy called the graphics "lackluster" and the environments "bland", feeling that the backgrounds were lacking in detail. Some reviewers also complained about the lack of enemies on screen.

IGN wrote that the narrative was "decently presented" and praised the game for its "easily recognizable" locations, but felt the plot for the Rise of Sauron campaign "could have been stronger". Game Informer believed that there was no story of any kind "outside of clips stolen from the motion picture". IGN commended the musical score and claimed that dedicated fans of online, class-based games and The Lord of the Rings would enjoy the game, a view not shared by OXM, who believed that fans of the books would be the most likely to hate it. The voice acting was panned by IGN UK as being "universally bad", with the exception of Hugo Weaving's narration. Another common source of annoyance was the in-game announcer who "barks instructions at you in one of the most insanely irritating voices in videogame history".

The game's multiplayer was regarded as a disappointment by Eurogamer, finding that the game's servers were marred by connection problems and lag, even without the maximum numbers of players. They also cited a lack of bots as a weakness, the "wide, open levels [feeling] sparse and under-populated" without them. The A.V. Club slated online play as "glitchy", sometimes placing the player "in a one-on-one match of capture the flag". IGN found that the multiplayer to a lesser extent "is hit by many of the same pitfalls as the single-player, which is to say that it gets redundant a little too quickly."

The DS version of the game was also criticized for similar complaints. IGN brought to light the AI problems of the version, with the player's allies "[running] around like a Hobbit with its head cut off". The lack of checkpoints and sub-standard graphics were also raised, along with lag during multiplayer and combat being unsatisfying, not getting "a sense that you are clashing swords and armor with your opponents". IGN also pointed out that the game seems much as though "the license is really just skinned onto capture the flag".
