= Panzer Dragoon Mini =

1996 video game

- Cover art depicting the Blue Dragon and three Imperial flying battleships
- Developer: Rit's
- Publisher: Sega
- Artist: Hiroshi Kajiyama
- Composer: Hitoshi Sakimoto
- Series: Panzer Dragoon
- Platform: Game Gear
- Release: JP: November 22, 1996
- Genre: Rail shooter
- Mode: Single-player

Panzer Dragoon Mini (Note: Japanese: パンツァードラグーン ミニ, Hepburn: Pantsā Doragūn Mini) is a 1996 rail shooter video game developed by Rit's and published by Sega for the Game Gear. It is a spin-off entry in the Panzer Dragoon series. In the game, the player controls one of three playable dragons across five levels, shooting down enemies with an aiming reticle. Mini was handled by Sega with no involvement from series creator Yukio Futatsugi or Team Andromeda. The soundtrack from Panzer Dragoon II Zwei was adapted by composer Hitoshi Sakimoto. It garnered poor review scores from Famitsu and 1up.com.

== Gameplay ==
Gameplay screenshot of the first stage

Panzer Dragoon Mini is a single-player rail shooter that spans five levels, with each after the first including a boss encounter. Gameplay is scaled-down compared to the Sega Saturn entries, featuring no story and three difficulty levels. The player controls an aiming reticle for one of three selectable super deformed flying dragons without a rider as they move through the level.

The reticle can be controlled with the D-pad, and the player can attack enemies by either shooting or locking on them to fire shots simultaneously. During boss encounters, the camera occasionally switches to the side of the dragon. The boss' projectiles can be shot down but cannot be locked on. Each dragon has a health bar, which is reduced whenever the dragon takes damage from an enemy. If the dragon's health is depleted, the game is over, but the player can keep playing via unlimited continues and resume their progress via a password feature.

== Development and release ==
Panzer Dragoon Mini was developed by Rit's, a Japanese game developer established in 1991. Artist Hiroshi Kajiyama worked on the game's pseudo-3D models, while the soundtrack from Panzer Dragoon II Zwei was adapted by composer Hitoshi Sakimoto. Mini was handled by Sega with no involvement from Team Andromeda apart from the game's cover art, which was approved by Panzer Dragoon series creator Yukio Futatsugi. The game was published by Sega on November 22, 1996, as part of the Kid's Gear lineup, a brand applied to Game Gear titles intended for children. Its late 1996 release, near the end of the Game Gear's lifespan, makes the game harder to find than earlier releases. It is considered a rare collector's item that commands high prices on the secondary collectible market.

== Reception ==
Reception

Review scores
Publication	Score
1Up.com	4/10
Famitsu	4/10, 3/10, 4/10, 3/10

Panzer Dragoon Mini was poorly received, with praise for its art style and boss designs but criticism of its pacing and lack of a plot. Famitsu's four reviewers found Mini monotonous compared to the previous Sega Saturn entries and faulted its graphical presentation. In a retrospective, Polish magazine Click! Konsole commended Mini for its visuals and simple gameplay premise. Sébastien Péretti of French publication Retro Game called Mini a shameful offshoot of the Panzer Dragoon series. 1Up.com's James Mielke regarded Mini as "a dumbed-down, cartoony shooter for kids that bears little resemblance to the epic adventures on Saturn."

Hardcore Gaming 101's Kurt Kalata felt Mini was similar to Space Harrier but much shorter than the original Panzer Dragoon (1995). Kalata noted the game's slow pacing and saw the bosses as its only positive aspect. MeriStation's Ramón Méndez González deemed Mini as a fun and "endearing curiosity", citing its super deformed (SD) artstyle as well as the simple controls and gameplay. Nevertheless, González concurred with Kalata regarding the similarities with Space Harrier and noted the game's lack of plot. Retro Gamer's Darran Jones criticized Mini for its basic visuals, erratic reticule, simple enemy waves, and bland gameplay approach compared to previous entries in the Panzer Dragoon series. Ollie Barder writing in Forbes labelled Mini alongside Panzer Dragoon for R-Zone as "pretty terrible" games, adding that "their music wasn't that noteworthy either."
