= Sylvan Tale =

1995 video game

- Developer(s): Sega
- Publisher(s): Sega
- Director(s): Katsuhiro Hasegawa; Yoshio Yoshida
- Producer(s): Hoko Chan
- Composer(s): Saori Kobayashi
- Platform(s): Game Gear
- Release: JP: January 27, 1995
- Genre(s): Action-adventure
- Mode(s): Single-player

Sylvan Tale (Note: Japanese: シルヴァン テイル, Hepburn: Shiruvan Teiru) is a 1995 action-adventure video game developed and published by Sega for the Game Gear. It was released exclusively in Japan.

The music for the game was composed by Saori Kobayashi, who also contributed to the soundtracks of Sega's Panzer Dragoon Saga and Panzer Dragoon Orta.

== Gameplay ==
Sylvan Tale follows the typical action-adventure game formula: The player controls a character called Zetts who must solve puzzles, fight enemies, and talk to non-player characters in order to acquire special powers and items that will allow him to unlock new areas of the game world and solve the puzzles within. While the player may revisit areas, the game progresses in an essentially linear fashion, as each area can only be accessed if Zetts has acquired a specific item or ability from the previous area.
