= PDZ =

PDZ may refer to:

- Panzer Dragoon II Zwei, a video game released for the Sega Saturn in 1996
- Perfect Dark Zero, a video game released for the Xbox 360 in 2005
- PDZ domain, a protein domain
