= Panzer Dragoon =

Video game series

- Genres: Rail shooter, role-playing
- Developers: Sega (Team Andromeda, Smilebit)
- Publisher: Sega
- Creator: Yukio Futatsugi
- Platforms: Sega Saturn; Game Gear; Xbox; Ports & remakes; Windows; PlayStation 2; PlayStation 4; Nintendo Switch; Xbox One; Stadia; Luna
- First release: Panzer Dragoon; 10 March 1995
- Latest release: Panzer Dragoon: Remake; 26 March 2020

Panzer Dragoon (Note: Pantsā Doragūn (Japanese: パンツァードラグーン)) is a video game series developed and published by Sega. The first three games — Panzer Dragoon (1995), Panzer Dragoon II Zwei (1996), and Panzer Dragoon Saga (1998) — were produced by Team Andromeda for the Sega Saturn. The fourth, Panzer Dragoon Orta (2002), was developed by Smilebit for the Xbox. A spin-off, Panzer Dragoon Mini (1996), was released for the handheld Game Gear in Japan. A remake of Panzer Dragoon was released in 2020.

The Panzer Dragoon games are rail shooters, except for the role-playing game Saga. Each follows a protagonist who rides an armored flying dragon, fighting human and monstrous enemies in a post-apocalyptic world. The Panzer Dragoon games received positive reviews for their art design, visuals, sound design, and atmospheric settings. Saga is one of the most acclaimed Saturn games and is listed among the greatest video games.

== Story ==
The Panzer Dragoon series takes place in a post-apocalyptic world in which humans have begun to recover technologies from the Ancient Age, a world-spanning, hyper-advanced civilization destroyed thousands of years before the events of the games. The Ancients used genetic engineering to create living weapons, which were unleashed in a cataclysmic war that nearly destroyed humanity. The mutated descendants of these creatures have merged into wild ecosystems, where they pose a continual threat to human civilization and serve as enemies encountered in the games.

Various human factions use recovered Ancient Age technologies, such as ubiquitous floating military airships, to defend against the wild mutants and to wage war against each other. Over the course of the series, a succession of characters ride mysterious armored flying dragons of extraordinary power, fighting to prevent humanity from reactivating the most destructive Ancient Age weapons and, ultimately, to destroy the remaining weapons and facilities of the Ancient Age so that humanity can be freed from the threat they pose.

== Games ==
Release timeline Main entries in bold
1995	**Panzer Dragoon**
1996	**Panzer Dragoon II Zwei**
1996	Panzer Dragoon Mini
1997
1998	**Panzer Dragoon Saga**
1999–2001
2002	**Panzer Dragoon Orta**
2003–2019
2020	Panzer Dragoon: Remake

=== Panzer Dragoon (1995) ===
The first Panzer Dragoon was released on the Sega Saturn in 1995. It was developed by Team Andromeda, a Sega development group assembled for this project. The protagonist is Keil Fluge, a hunter who stumbles into a battle between two flying dragons, one blue and one black. The rider of the blue dragon is mortally wounded in the fight and entrusts Keil with his dragon and his mission to stop the Dark Dragon from reactivating an Ancient Age ruin of tremendous destructive power.

The dragon and its rider fly through the first level of Panzer Dragoon. The yellow aiming reticle appears in the center, the player's life bar in the lower left, and the radar in the top right corner.

This game established the core features of the Panzer Dragoon series: 3D rail shooter gameplay, divided into levels with ending bosses, controlled through an on-screen targeting reticle, with a choice of two main attacks (a rapid-fire attack and a lock-on homing attack), and a camera that can be rotated by 90-degree increments to face enemies attacking from all directions.

=== Panzer Dragoon II Zwei (1996) ===
Panzer Dragoon II Zwei was released for the Sega Saturn in 1996. Developed by Team Andromeda as a prequel to Panzer Dragoon, it follows Jean-Jacques Lundi, a villager who defies taboo to raise a mutant pack animal with wings and a green bioluminescent throat, naming him Lagi. After Lundi's village is destroyed by a flying warship from the Ancient Age, he pursues it with Lagi, who grows into an armored flying dragon. Together they destroy the airship and defeat its guardian dragon.

Zwei introduced the "berserk" attack, an intermittently available attack that hits all enemies on screen and gives temporary invulnerability, along with branching paths through many levels, and the progressive growth and metamorphosis of the dragon over the course of the game. It also added an extras menu called "Pandora's Box" that would return in later entries.

=== Panzer Dragoon Mini (1996) ===
Panzer Dragoon Mini is a spin-off 2D rail shooter released exclusively in Japan for the Game Gear handheld in 1996. It has three selectable dragons inspired by the blue dragon from Panzer Dragoon, which are rendered with a super deformed appearance and no rider. Most of the levels, enemies and music are modeled after those of Panzer Dragoon and Zwei. Due to the technical limitations of the Game Gear, the camera cannot be controlled and instead rotates automatically. Mini was developed by a third party, with no involvement from Team Andromeda.

=== Panzer Dragoon Saga (1998) ===
Panzer Dragoon Saga (titled Azel: Panzer Dragoon RPG in Japan) is a role-playing game (RPG) developed by Team Andromeda and released for Saturn in 1998. The player controls Edge, a mercenary who encounters a mysterious girl named Azel in an Ancient Age excavation. After being attacked by a rogue military force, he is rescued by an armored flying dragon. Though at first motivated by revenge, Edge becomes embroiled in a conflict over control of Ancient Age weapons, and he ultimately invades and destroys the AI network controlling the various Ancient facilities around the world.

Saga is the only Panzer Dragoon game that is not a rail shooter, combining traditional role-playing elements such as items and random encounters with the setting and motifs of previous games. The combat system mixes real-time and turn-based elements, with the player circling enemies on the dragon to expose weak spots and escape dangerous positions. Saga also introduced the ability to morph the dragon between different forms emphasizing offense, defense, mobility, and other attributes.

=== Panzer Dragoon Orta (2002) ===
Panzer Dragoon Orta was released for Xbox in late 2002 in Japan and in early 2003 in America and Europe. It was developed by Smilebit, which was founded by former members of Team Andromeda. The story follows Orta, a teenage girl held captive until she is rescued by an armored flying dragon during an attack on her town. She is pursued by multiple factions that want to use her connection with the Ancient Age to build weapons. Ultimately, she destroys an army of dragon-like creatures and the Ancient Age facility being used to produce them, along with an Ancient android who hopes to wipe out humanity.

A return to the rail shooter genre, Orta introduced several features inspired by mechanics from Saga, such as maneuvering around enemies and shifting the dragon between different forms during combat. The game featured large amounts of unlockable content, including a story encyclopedia, side missions, video cutscenes from previous games, and the entire playable game Panzer Dragoon.

=== Panzer Dragoon: Remake (2020) ===
A remake of Panzer Dragoon was developed by MegaPixel Studio and published by Forever Entertainment in March 2020 for Nintendo Switch. It was released on Stadia on 1 June, with Windows, PlayStation 4, Xbox One, and Amazon Luna versions later in 2020. The remake features updated graphics and an optional new control system that allows players to aim independently of movement with a second control stick.

== Development ==
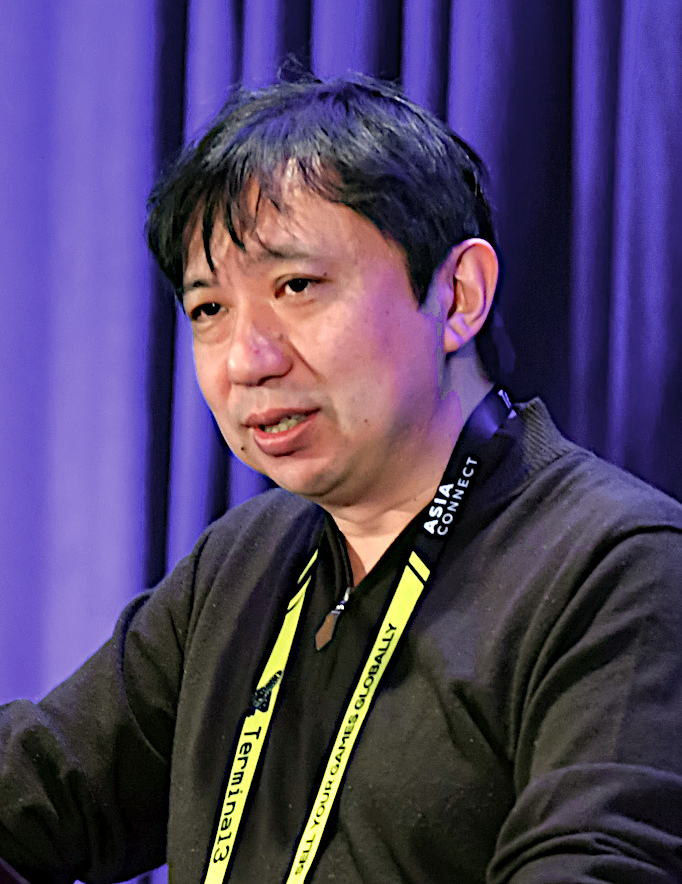
Series creator Yukio Futatsugi

In the early 1990s, the Japanese video game company Sega asked its developers for shooting game ideas to add variety to its forthcoming Sega Saturn console. Yukio Futatsugi proposed the concept for Panzer Dragoon and was made the head of Team Andromeda, a development team that Sega assembled for the project in early 1994. Development lasted almost a year, with a staff of fifteen. With influences including Space Harrier, Starblade, Star Fox, and RayForce, the project became a 3D rail shooter. The original concept was titled Armored Dragon (kiko-ryu in Japanese), but Futatsugi, feeling that this was too bland, changed to the pseudo-German translation Panzer Dragoon.

The post-apocalyptic fantasy world, featuring ruins and relics of a fallen civilization, was particularly influenced by one of Futatsugi's childhood readings, The Long Afternoon of Earth. The art design, which mixes natural and technological elements, was mainly the work of Manabu Kusunoki, who took inspiration from various sources, including anime and manga. Critics have noted similarities with the works of the French artist Mœbius, of whom Kusunoki was a fan, as well as with Hayao Miyazaki's Nausicaa of the Valley of the Wind and David Lynch's film Dune. Futatsugi created a fictional language from a mixture of Ancient Greek, Latin and Russian, apparently inspired by the film The Wings of Honneamise.

Panzer Dragoon was released in early 1995 to moderately successful sales. Sega developed two sequels: while Panzer Dragoon II Zwei would expand on the original's rail shooter gameplay, Panzer Dragon Saga would be an RPG to compete with Final Fantasy VII and other PlayStation offerings. Development of Zwei began in mid-1995, months after Panzer Dragoon's release. Team Andromeda split into two teams to work on both projects, but due to the work overload this created, Saga was largely put on hold until Zwei was completed. Production took less than a year, since the first game's engine was reused, with a team of between fifteen and twenty people. Tomohiro Kondo, a senior member of Team Andromeda, was the producer and director. Futatsugi originally oversaw both projects' narratives, but, as his attention shifted onto Saga, Zwei's story became the responsibility of Katsuhiko Yamada. Zwei was released in early 1996.

Saga used the same engine and tools, but with a team twice the size. Akihiko Mukaiyama was brought in to design a combat system that would combine elements of RPG and shooter gameplay. After the combat was finalized, development progressed more quickly, and some staff were moved to help complete Zwei. Kusunoki, who had been the main character and art designer for the previous games, was made the art director, and Katsumi Yokota created the character and cover art. Saga featured full Japanese voice acting, subtitled rather than dubbed in the English-language release. The localizers were given incomplete translations and little supervision, so they inserted their own interpretations and invented names for monsters. By the time Saga was released in early 1998, Sega had shifted its focus to its next console, the Dreamcast. Saga had a limited release outside Japan, and sales worldwide were poor; it has never been re-released and is now a rare collector's item. After the release, Sega disbanded Team Andromeda; Futatsugi left Sega and joined Konami, while other staff moved to new Sega teams, including Smilebit, which would develop the next Panzer Dragoon game.

A new Panzer Dragoon was pitched for the Dreamcast, but the console did not meet the technical requirements. There was also a feeling among staff that the original trilogy had reached its logical conclusion. Following the commercial failure of the Dreamcast, Sega left the console market and began developing and publishing games for other platforms. Discussion about a possible Panzer Dragoon for Microsoft's Xbox began in 2000. Takayuki Kawagoe was made producer and decided that Panzer Dragoon Orta would be another rail shooter. Mukaiyama, Saga's combat designer, directed Orta, and development began in early 2001 at Smilebit, lasting eighteen months. Takashi Iwade, a visual effects artist on earlier Panzer Dragoon games, became the art director, and Takashi Atsu was the lead programmer. Orta incorporated elements from Saga into the series' traditional rail shooter gameplay, with a story co-written by Shigeru Kurihara and Kenichiro Ishii. It was released in late 2002 in Japan and early 2003 in the West.

== Music ==
The soundtrack for the first Panzer Dragoon was developed after the rest of the game was largely complete, so that the music could reflect each level's art style and events. The game's "on rails" progression system meant that the composer could write pieces timed to specifically match the player's position in each level. The soundtrack was outsourced to Yoshitaka Azuma, who scored the game with a mixture of orchestral and synthesizer tracks.

Music composition for Zwei was led by Yayoi Wachi. Additional tracks were composed by Tomonori Sawada, Junko Shiratsu, and Teruhiko Nakagawa. In contrast to the purely orchestral and electronic score of the first game, Zwei added ethnic or tribal elements. Rather than using prerecorded music, the soundtrack for Zwei is mostly generated via pulse-code modulation by the Saturn's hardware, a technique used again on Saga.

Saga's soundtrack was composed by Saori Kobayashi and Mariko Nanba, with vocals by Eri Itō and arrangement by Hayato Matsuo. It includes South American, African, Celtic, classical and new age influences. The Verge described it as blend of traditional European and Middle Eastern folk styles with science fiction-like synthesizer sounds. Kobayashi credited Zwei and Wachi with establishing the series' distinctive sound and shaping her future compositions for the series. The orchestrated ending theme, featuring lyrics in the games' fictional language, was intended to avoid any sense of closure, leaving the story "open-ended".

Kobayashi returned for principal composition of the soundtrack of Orta, with additional tracks by Yutaka Minobe. The orchestrated, lyrical ending theme was again arranged by Matsuo and sung by Itō. The music continued in the ethnic-influenced style established on the soundtracks for Zwei and Saga, but the Xbox hardware allowed for richer and more varied sounds than the Saturn.

== Other media ==
Production I.G released a direct-to-video anime short film adaptation of the first game in 1996. The story is altered to include a female character whom Keil ('Kyle' in the film) tries to save after she is kidnapped by the Black Dragon. An English dub was released by ADV Films in 1998. The film was panned for its poor animation, awkward script, and cliché story.

The Sega kart racing game Sonic & All-Stars Racing Transformed features a racetrack based on Panzer Dragoon. The Archie Comics Worlds Unite crossover between the Sonic the Hedgehog and the Mega Man comic lines features Panzer Dragoon characters and concepts.

== Reception ==
Aggregate review scores As of 7 June 2023.
Game	Aggregate scores
Panzer Dragoon	91%
Panzer Dragoon II Zwei	88%
Panzer Dragoon Mini	14/40
Panzer Dragoon Saga	92%
Panzer Dragoon Orta	90/100
Panzer Dragoon: Remake	63/100

The original Panzer Dragoon received praise for its art design, visual effects, music, atmospheric setting, and cinematic cutscenes, though critics were divided by the difficulty and simple gameplay. A reviewer for Next Generation wrote that the game combined "incredible story animation with brilliant, 3D flight graphics", and an Entertainment Weekly reviewer called it a "lyrical and exhilarating epic" that could pave the way for a "transformation" of the videogame industry. Electronic Gaming Monthly named it the "Best Saturn Game of 1995" and placed it 140th in "The Greatest 200 Videogames of their time" in 2006.

Zwei was acclaimed, with praise focusing on the cutting-edge graphics, gameplay refinements relative to the first game, and the continued strength of the art design, music, and atmosphere, though the low difficulty again received criticism. A Next Generation reviewer praised the game's art direction and plot, saying Zwei's "visual sophistication and compelling storylines" compensated for its "less than revolutionary gameplay". It was a runner-up for Electronic Gaming Monthly's Shooter Game of the Year (behind Alien Trilogy) and Best Graphics of the Year (behind Super Mario 64), and the following year they ranked it number 90 on their "100 Best Games of All Time".

Panzer Dragoon Mini was poorly received, with praise for its art style and boss designs but criticism of its pacing and lack of a plot. The simplistic controls and very short duration divided critics, some of whom thought the game adequate for a handheld game console, and some of whom were disappointed by the contrast with the Saturn games. 1Up.com called Mini "a dumbed-down, cartoony shooter for kids that bears little resemblance to the epic adventures on Saturn."

Saga is often listed among the greatest video games ever made, earning acclaim for its story, graphics, and combat, along with criticism for its low difficulty and short play time. Reviewers praised the story's restraint and lack of cliché, as well as the complexity of the characters; even the dragon has been called an "intimate computer companion", drawing comparisons to the later games of Fumito Ueda (Ico, Shadow of the Colossus, and The Last Guardian). Game Informer called the game "one of the year's best, and generally considered the Saturn's finest title". Saga was named one of the best games of all time by Computer and Video Games in 2000, Electronic Gaming Monthly in 2001 and 2006, IGN readers in 2005, IGN in 2007, and G4 in 2012.

Orta was critically acclaimed, receiving praise for its visual design, unlockable content, and faithfulness to the series, while reviewers criticized the short play time and dated, on-rails structure. Opinions of the controls and the increased difficulty were mixed. Eurogamer called Orta "refined, well designed and intelligent", marking "a real progression in the genre", and GamePro said that its complex and beautiful level design almost overwhelmed the senses. Orta has been consistently listed as one of the best games for the original Xbox, by publications including GamesRadar, Digital Trends, and IGN, the latter describing it as the "pinnacle of rail shooters".

Panzer Dragoon: Remake received lukewarm reviews upon release. Critics consistently praised the remake's faithfulness to the original's gameplay and the retention of the original soundtrack, but they were divided by the updated visuals and disappointed by the short play time. Nintendo Life found both the Saturn-era control scheme and an alternative added by the remake to be awkward, and Eurogamer called the new environment art "just as often muddy as it is marvelous". IGN found that the arcade-like structure of the game offered little replay value to a modern player.

=== Legacy ===
Former Panzer Dragoon development staff worked on spiritual successors such as Rez (2001) and Crimson Dragon (2013). The Panzer Dragoon series and the Saturn received positive reviews but sold poorly, and Panzer Dragoon has been described as "short-lived and beloved". Kotaku wrote that it was "emblematic" of the Saturn, beginning as a showcase of the Saturn's technical abilities and ending, with Saga, as an RPG to compete with the Final Fantasy series. Though it is rarely named as an influence by developers, it pioneered design elements later popularized in more successful games. In 2019, Futatsugi said proposals for new Panzer Dragoon games had occasionally been made within Sega, and that he had considered approaching Sega to license the series.
