= Panzer Dragoon (video game) =

1995 video game

- Japanese cover art by Jean Giraud, depicting Keil and the Blue Dragon
- Developers: Sega (Team Andromeda); Land Ho! (PS2); MegaPixel Studio (remake)
- Publishers: Sega; Forever Entertainment (remake)
- Director: Yukio Futatsugi
- Producers: Yoji Ishii; Tomohiro Kondo
- Programmer: Junichi Suto
- Artist: Manabu Kusunoki
- Composer: Yoshitaka Azuma
- Series: Panzer Dragoon
- Engine: Unity (Remake)
- Platforms: Sega Saturn; Windows; Xbox; PlayStation 2; Remake; Nintendo Switch; Stadia; Windows; PlayStation 4; Xbox One
- Release: March 10, 1995: Original Saturn; JP: March 10, 1995; NA: May 11, 1995; UK: August 18, 1995 Windows; PAL: December 5, 1996; JP: March 14, 1997 Xbox; JP: December 19, 2002; NA: January 14, 2003; PAL: March 21, 2003 PlayStation 2; JP: April 27, 2006 Remake Switch; WW: March 26, 2020 Stadia; WW: June 1, 2020 Windows; WW: September 25, 2020 PlayStation 4; WW: September 28, 2020 Xbox One; WW: December 11, 2020
- Genre: Rail shooter
- Mode: Single-player

Panzer Dragoon (Note: Pantsā Doragūn (Japanese: パンツァードラグーン)) is a 1995 rail shooter game developed by Team Andromeda and published by Sega for the Sega Saturn. It is the first game in the Panzer Dragoon series. The game follows hunter Keil Fluge, who becomes the rider of a powerful dragon. The player moves an aiming reticle (representing the dragon's laser and Kyle's gun) and shoots enemies while the dragon flies through 3D environments on a predetermined track.

As one of six games available at the Sega Saturn's surprise North American launch, Panzer Dragoon was the first game created by Team Andromeda. It was also the directorial debut of Yukio Futatsugi, who was 25 years old at the time of release. Panzer Dragoon received critical acclaim, with praise for its gameplay, graphics, art direction, and post-apocalyptic story, though some criticized its high difficulty. Electronic Gaming Monthly named it game of the month and the best Saturn game of the year, and named it the 140th-best game of all time in 2006.

Panzer Dragoon was ported to Windows and PlayStation 2, and was followed by Panzer Dragoon II Zwei (1996) and Panzer Dragoon Saga (1998) for Saturn and Panzer Dragoon Orta (2002) for Xbox, which includes the original Panzer Dragoon as a bonus feature. A remake of Panzer Dragoon was developed by MegaPixel Studio and published by Forever Entertainment in 2020 for Nintendo Switch, Stadia, Windows, PlayStation 4, Amazon Luna and Xbox One.

== Gameplay ==
The dragon and its rider flying through level 1. The yellow aiming reticle appears in the center and the radar in the top right corner. The player's health bar is located in the bottom left.

Panzer Dragoon spans six levels, each lasting about five minutes, with a variety of boss battles. Over the course of the game, the plot is revealed through cutscenes using the game's own graphic engine. Gameplay consists of a player controlling a flying dragon and his rider through an aiming reticle that can be moved over the whole screen with the D-pad; the player must shoot a variety of enemies (ranging from machines to monsters) in a 3D post-apocalyptic fantasy environment of barren landscapes and mysterious ruins of a fallen civilization. Progression through the levels is made at a predetermined pace, as the player is constantly set along a rail of gameplay. The only time the game pauses is during boss battles. The field of vision can be directed with the aiming reticle on the x and y-axis, but the overall direction of travel is predetermined. The dragon follows the reticle movements, allowing the player to avoid enemy projectiles and obstacles.

The player has a full, 360-degree field of view, and can quickly look left, right, forward, and behind the dragon. Enemies come from all directions, varying in size and health, and also appear on an on-screen radar that monitors the dragon's surroundings. Two weapons are available: the rider's handgun, which can be fired with a single button press when an enemy enters the aiming reticle, and the homing laser fired by the dragon, which can lock on up to eight enemies by moving the reticle over them while holding down the fire button. Some situations with many enemies on screen require the use of the lock-on laser, while in others, quick gunshots to weak spots will prove more efficient.

== Plot ==
Panzer Dragoon is set in the distant future, thousands of years after a great war between humans and their biologically engineered weapons, when humans live in everything from small tribes to large nations. One nation, the Empire, has discovered a black tower in the middle of a lake near their capital, which gave them access to large amounts of ancient weapons which they used to beat back and control the ever present monsters in the world. The Imperials were corrupted by this power and became conquerors of others as opposed to liberators from a violent world.

The introduction movie opens with the protagonist, Keil Fluge (unnamed in the North American version), hunting in a canyon. After seeing an Imperial flying battleship in the sky, he is attacked by two creatures and chases one of them to a large, ancient complex built directly into the rock. He explores the ruin, and sees relics of old technology still hanging from the ceilings. Another gigantic creature suddenly attacks him, and though his weapon is useless against the armored creature, a rumbling triggers a cave in, which crushes the monster and saves Keil. From the newly created hole, an armored, blue dragon flies down the cavern with a rider across its shoulders, being chased by an even bigger black dragon as the cavern is destroyed in an explosion. Regaining consciousness outside, Keil sees the two dragons locked in combat in the air before him. Dodging a blast from the black dragon, the blue dragon's rider is then hit by single shot to the chest, and the black dragon flies away. The blue dragon flies towards Keil. A psychic connection is made between the rider and Keil, who is told not to let the black dragon reach the black tower. The rider then dies and Keil picks up his fallen gun, climbs atop the dragon and flies away, determined to finish the rider's quest.

During the first level of the game, Keil and his dragon fly through a drowned city, where they encounter a small Imperial patrol ship. That ship sends a report to a large fleet of ships flying above the clouds. It is revealed that the Imperial forces are specifically searching for the blue dragon. The second level is a desert, where Keil and the dragon encounter gigantic worm-like creatures. At the stormy edge of the desert, they are confronted by the Black Dragon, which is defeated and speeds away. The third level is a mountainous landscape at night-time where Keil and the dragon get reacquainted with the Imperial forces, which were exploring ancient ruins. These encounters illustrate the ongoing conflict between the Imperial forces and the ancient machines and creatures. The fourth level is an ancient facility in which Keil and the dragon are pursued by both Imperial airships and cybernetic sentinels left behind by the ancient civilization. During the fifth level, they defeat a large armada of the most powerful Imperial ships over a forested area. A cutscene then shows a fleet of dragon-like creatures coming out of the tower to attack the Imperial forces. The sixth level features the black dragon and Keil racing through the battle-scarred Imperial capital. During this, they are both waylaid by the creatures and machines seen attacking the Imperial fleet around the tower while also being fired on by Imperial defenses. The black dragon then reaches the Tower and is mutated into a gigantic super-dragon and begins a climactic battle with Keil and the blue dragon, after which the black dragon is defeated and falls into the ocean.

In the ending cutscene, Keil and the dragon enter the tower. While traveling down a long corridor, the dragon surrounds Keil in a force field, lifting him from the saddle and suspending him in the hallway. Keil watches as the dragon continues on to the core of the tower, then a blinding light is seen and the tower explodes. Keil wakes up some time later in a desert area abutting the ocean. Looking down, he sees the foot prints of the blue dragon around him, indicating that after the explosion, the dragon carried him to safety and flew away.

== Development ==
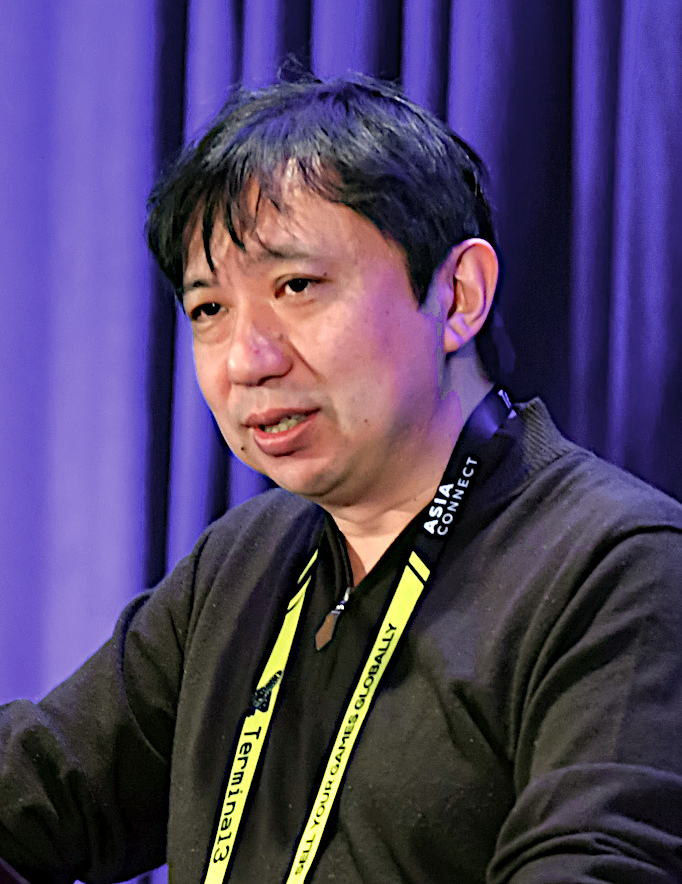
Director Yukio Futatsugi

Panzer Dragoon was created in the early 1990s as the Japanese video game company Sega was preparing to release its Saturn console. In 1993, as the Saturn lacked third-party games, Sega asked its developers for game ideas; according to art director Manabu Kusunoki, Sega asked for shooting game ideas to add variety to the Saturn's launch library. Twenty-three-year-old Yukio Futatsugi, who had joined Sega only two years before, proposed several concepts, including Panzer Dragoon. Futatsugi became the head of Team Andromeda, a development team that Sega assembled for the project in early 1994 and was built around the duo formed by Futatsugi and Kusunoki. Development lasted almost a year, with a staff of 15.

The project was designed as arcade-style, as core members of the team like Kusunoki came from Sega's arcade department. Team Andromeda wanted to create a fully 3D arcade game, having worked on similar games such as Out Run which were not truly 3D. With influences including Space Harrier, Starblade, Star Fox, and RayForce, the project became a 3D rail shooter. Usually, in 3D shooters, the player rides a 3D object like a jet fighter or a tank. Futatsugi and Kusunoki decided it would be more original for the player to ride an armored dragon, a living creature which would also allow for richer animations. The original concept for the game was named "Armored Dragon" (kikō-ryū in Japanese), but Futatsugi, feeling that this was too bland, decided to change it to the pseudo-German translation "Panzer Dragoon".

With this basic concept in mind, the creators had 3 months to define a visual identity and a setting for their game, prior to development. The game would be set in a post-apocalyptic science fantasy world, featuring ruins and relics of a fallen civilization with mankind rebuilding itself while surviving, enduring and so forth in that era of perdition. A theme presented in many anime series at that time. Futatsugi was particularly influenced by one of his childhood readings, The Long Afternoon of Earth, a science-fiction novel by Brian Aldiss, in which one side of the earth became perpetually hot, the other perpetually cold. The first presentation video featured a green dragon, in line with traditional European/medieval depictions, however the team quickly decided to change it and make it "more sci-fi". In order for the dragon to be more original, it was made blue and covered in a white, bone-like armor. The dragon was supposed to come from the ancient times, so ruins and ancient flying technology also featured this white, shell-like material.

The overall fantasy look of the game's world, which mixed natural and technological elements, was also chosen in order to set it apart from classic science-fiction 3D games of the time. This world, as well as dragon and character designs, were mainly the work of Manabu Kusunoki, who took inspiration from various sources, including anime and manga, and who pushed the art direction toward a more Turkish/Ottoman style to avoid the European aesthetics of the early presentation video. Critics have noted similarities with the works of French artist Moebius (notably his comic book Arzach,) of whom Kusunoki was a fan, as well as with Hayao Miyazaki's Nausicaa of the Valley of the Wind, and David Lynch's Dune movie. Kentaro Yoshida, texturing and modeling artist, described the creation process as similar in style to Star Wars, in that it "made an unearthly world appear so real". Takashi Iwade, in charge of the opening cutscene and character models, designed the enemies using a lot of various influences: "I got inspiration from antique clocks and various industrial products from the era of the industrial revolution for mechanics, and myriapods, marine mollusks, ammonite, and a rusty fishing boat for creatures when I started thinking of the original battleship". The team wanted a famous artist to make the game's cover art. Manabu Kusunoki suggested Moebius, who accepted, and the team sent him designs that he was to interpret. The resulting illustration was used as the cover art for the Japanese release of the game.

The Saturn's hardware was new to the team, and it was their first attempt at creating an original environment. It was also Futatsugi's first year working as a full developer at Sega, so he was only able to do simple things while having a clear vision of what he wanted, which helped him to keep the overall style pure, with stark and minimalist cutscenes. Similarly, Iwade kept the enemies easy to understand visually, with simple shapes, and this overall simple style ended up fitting well with the Saturn's hardware. Then, Team Andromeda set to work on elaborating an extensive back story, and Futatsugi, to be original and to avoid using Japanese or English, went so far as to create a fictional language for the game: a mix of Ancient Greek, Latin and Russian. This was apparently inspired by the anime The Wings of Honneamise, of which team members were fans and which also features an invented language.

After the story and art were established, the team set to work on the graphics. Working on new hardware proved difficult for the young team, and the game ended up missing the initial deadline given by Sega, which was the Saturn Japanese launch in November 1994. One of the problems was that the Saturn hardware was only finalized in mid-1994, and without actual Saturn prototype to test their progress, the programmers initially had to work with hypothetical hardware performance. Team Andromeda created its own graphics library and mapping tools instead of using Sega's, in order to make the most of their first game on the new system. The game's graphics and cutscenes were done with Softimage, and the 3D elements were programmed on SGI workstations using OpenGL. The programmers were eventually able to transition to the debug Saturn they had received, but the process was difficult and the game had a very low frame rate at first, before it increased to approx. 20 FPS. The six levels of Panzer Dragoon are barren landscapes with ancient ruins, which is consistent with the "simple" style appropriate for the Saturn. The first two levels that the team programmed, a desert (level 2) and a forest (level 5), did not have any objects or anything besides sand and forest effects, again because the team was unsure how far the hardware could be pushed. Keeping CPU limitations in mind, simple tornado effects were added to level 2, so that it did not look too bland.

Work on the soundtrack began after completion of the game, similar to the way movie soundtracks are made. The idea was to create music that would specifically reflect each level's art-style and events. As the game had an "on rails" progression system, the developers knew exactly where the player would be at any given time, so they showed videos to the composer and asked him to write specifically timed pieces that would match the player's progression in each level. The soundtrack was outsourced to Yoshitaka Azuma, who was composing music for NHK TV programs at that time. The music of Panzer Dragoon is a mix between orchestral and synthesizer tracks.

Sega of America made several alterations to the game to make the North American release more challenging. These alterations were retained in the PAL version.

== Releases ==
Panzer Dragoon was released in Japan on March 10, 1995, North America on May 11, 1995 as one of the six launch games for the North American release, and the United Kingdom on August 18, 1995, on the Sega Saturn console. It was followed by Panzer Dragoon II Zwei (1996) and Panzer Dragoon Saga (1998), both for Saturn, and Panzer Dragoon Orta (2002) for Xbox.

In 1996, Panzer Dragoon was ported to Windows. Identical to the Saturn version except with a higher resolution, this version was also included as a bonus in Panzer Dragoon Orta. Aside from providing the source code, Team Andromeda had no involvement in the development of the Windows version. It was sold bundled with the NV1 PCI Card. In 1997, a software rendered version was released, requiring at least an Intel Pentium P5 processor.

An updated version of Panzer Dragoon was included in the Japan-only Sega Ages 2500 collection for PlayStation 2 in 2006. The port was handled by development studio Land Ho!, and features the original Saturn game and an "arrange" version with anti-aliasing filter, better texturing, and improved 3D models for the dragon and some enemies. The "arrange" version also adds unlockable extras such as level selection and artworks, in the form of a "Pandora's Box" option menu.

== Reception ==
Reviews (original)

Review scores
| Publication | Score |
|---|---|
| 1Up.com | 8/10 |
| Computer and Video Games | 91% |
| Electronic Gaming Monthly | 9/10, 8.5/10, 8.5/10, 7.5/10 |
| Famitsu | 8/10, 7/10, 8/10, 7/10 |
| Game Informer | 9/10 |
| IGN | 9/10 |
| Next Generation | 4/5 |
| Entertainment Weekly | A |
| Game Players | 85% |
| Maximum | 4/5 |
| Sega Magazin | 91% |
| VideoGames & Computer Entertainment | 9/10 |

Panzer Dragoon received positive reviews, both in 1995 and in retrospective coverage. Though sales were not as high as Sega expected, possibly due to the success of Sony's PlayStation console over the Saturn, they were substantial enough for Sega to develop sequels. As of 2000, the game had sold 408,234 units in Japan, making it the 20th best selling Saturn title domestically.

As one of the first Saturn games, Panzer Dragoon was highly anticipated by journalists after its appearance in promotional material. A reviewer for Next Generation said the game "orchestrates incredible story animation with brilliant, 3D flight graphics to create what is, basically, the ultimate evolution of Space Harrier." He also highly praised the gameplay, particularly the variety of enemies, the difficulty slope, and the controls. Ed Semrad and Danyon Carpenter from Electronic Gaming Monthly praised the game for its "innovative game play" and its "awe-inspiring visuals" from the opening cinematic to the backgrounds and the dragon's animations. Al Manuel and Ken Williams criticized the game's lack of diversity in weapons and its predetermined progression; but the four EGM reviewers agreed that it was a must-have game for Saturn owners. Similarly, The Unknown Gamer from GamePro called the game a "masterpiece", highlighted its high-quality graphics and music, and described the story as "captivat[ing]". However, the journalist noted the game's overall difficulty "will single out all but advanced players" with its lack of power-ups or extra lives of any kind. Nevertheless, the game was seen as a good example of the Saturn's capabilities. In contrast, a reviewer from Maximum said that the game was much too easy even on the highest difficulty setting, greatly reducing its already low longevity. He also said the gameplay would be too simplistic for many players, with its on-rails shooting and selection of only two weapons, but was overall very positive in his assessment of the game, highly praising the 360 degrees of rotation and most especially the textured 3D graphics of the enemies, settings, and bosses.

Patrick Baggatta from Game Players stated that while the game may come off as "just a simple shooter", it is at least a "very good one" that "puts a twist on the tired formula", again praising the game play and the variety in camera angles. Chris Gore from VideoGames & Computer Entertainment named the game "the best shooter since Star Fox", and a must-have for fantasy and sci-fi fans, with its "eerie" atmosphere noted by editor Betty Hallock. While the story itself was said to be "somewhat typical" and editor Chris Bieniek criticized the on-rail aspect, Gore noted the game's "spectacular visuals", and presented it as one of the Saturn's system sellers. Famitsu magazine's Reader Cross Review gave the game a 9 out of 10 in April 1995. The game's universe itself was deemed "coolly surreal" by Entertainment Weekly reviewer Albert Kim, who thought the game's seven-minute "movie-quality" introduction was "gorgeous" and "nearly overshadowed the game itself". Kim argued that Panzer Dragoon could be seen as a "lyrical and exhilarating epic", a "story, not just a game" which could pave the way for a "transformation" of the videogame industry. Film director Steven Spielberg approached Team Andromeda to say he was impressed by the game's presentation at the 1995 E3 show.

James Mielke from online game magazine 1UP.com gave Panzer Dragoon a retroactive review of 8/10 for what the game offered in 1995, but gave it a modern score of 6/10. Mielke highlighted the music as "one of the finest game soundtracks ever produced," but said that the game itself "staggers a bit under the glaring light of a critical rereview[sic]", arguing it is "little more than Space Harrier with a 3D camera and cut-scenes." By contrast, Levi Buchanan from IGN gave the game a retrospective score of 9/10, opining that "the fact that Panzer Dragoon holds up as well in 2008 as it did in 1995 is a just testament to the staying power of good art and tight gameplay." Kurt Kalata, in a Gamasutra retrospective, also praised its art and universe, but said the actual game looked "a bit cut and dried" compared to its sequels.

Game developer Taro Yoko is a well known fan of the game.

=== Accolades ===
It was named "Best Saturn Game of 1995" by Electronic Gaming Monthly in their 1996 Buyers' Guide. Panzer Dragoon ranked 140th in EGM′s "The Greatest 200 Videogames of their time" feature published in 2006. In 1996, GamesMaster ranked the game 5th on their "The GamesMaster Saturn Top 10."

== Remake ==
Reviews (remake)

Aggregate score
| Aggregator | Score |
|---|---|
| Metacritic | NS: 63/100 |

Review scores
| Publication | Score |
|---|---|
| Destructoid | 6/10 |
| Nintendo Life | 6/10 |

A remake of Panzer Dragoon was developed by MegaPixel Studio and published by Forever Entertainment in March 2020 for Nintendo Switch. It was released on Stadia on June 1, with Windows, PlayStation 4, Xbox One, and Amazon Luna versions later in 2020.

The remake features updated graphics and an optional new control system that allows players to aim independently of movement with the second control stick. Switch reviewers criticized the updated controls and short length. Nintendo Life concluded that it was "a decent take on an all-time classic that goes some way to modernising it, but doesn't quite nail the landing".
