= Hundred Swords =

2001 video game

- Developer: Smilebit
- Publishers: JP: Sega; NA: Activision Value; EU: Empire Interactive
- Platforms: Microsoft Windows, Dreamcast
- Release: Dreamcast: JP: February 8 2001; Windows: JP/EU: 2001; US: February 6 2002
- Genre: Real-time strategy

Hundred Swords is a real-time strategy video game developed by Smilebit and published by Sega for the Dreamcast exclusively in Japan. It was later ported to the PC and released globally by Sega in Japan, Activision Value in North America and Empire Interactive in Europe. The PC release was compatible with Windows 95, 98, and Me.

== Gameplay ==
The game was described by IGN as an "overtly western-style real-time strategy game". Both the Dreamcast and Windows releases supported up to four player online play, and offline play in two modes: Adventure Mode and Mission Mode.

== Development ==
The title was Smilebit's next game following the critical success of Jet Set Radio. Yoshio Sugiura, a freelance illustrator with a "unique western influence" was commissioned to design the game's characters and creatures.

== Release ==
Hundred Swords was released for the Dreamcast exclusively in Japan in February 2001. The game was subsequently ported to Windows, with releases in Japan and Europe in 2001. The North American PC version was published by Activision Value, which announced that the game had shipped in February 2002.

In China, distributor Tianren Interactive announced plans to release a Chinese-language PC edition in January 2002, listing the game under the title Bai Jian (百剑).

== Reception ==
On release, Famitsu magazine scored the Dreamcast version of the game a review score of 31 out of 40.

Reviewing the PC release, Greg Kasavin of GameSpot scored the title 7.1 out of 10, writing that "its mechanics are simplistic, its controls can be cumbersome, and the pathfinding for the game's units is dreadful", but praising its story as an "epic tale that creates a really great context for the gameplay" arguing that it "effectively draws you into its fantasy world during the cutscenes between battles".
