= Gunvalkyrie =

2002 video game

- Developer: Smilebit
- Publisher: Sega
- Directors: Hisayoshi Yoshida; Tadashi Ihoroi
- Producer: Takayuki Kawagoe
- Programmer: Takahiro Nagata
- Artist: Yuichi Ide
- Composers: Teruhiko Nakagawa; Tatsuyuki Maeda
- Platform: Xbox
- Release: NA: March 19, 2002; JP: March 21, 2002; EU: May 17, 2002
- Genre: Third-person shooter
- Mode: Single-player

Gunvalkyrie (ガンヴァルキリー, Ganvarukirī) is a third-person shooter video game developed by Smilebit and published by Sega for the Microsoft Xbox. It was released on March 19, 2002 in North America; March 21, 2002 in Japan; and May 17, 2002 in PAL regions. Set in an alternate history science fiction world where the British Empire rules Earth and various extrasolar planets, the game tasks the player with exterminating the giant insects that infest the colonies of the planet Tir na Nog. Originally in development for the Sega Dreamcast, the game was moved to the Xbox to take advantage of its improved hardware and controls.

Gunvalkyrie received mixed reviews from critics, who praised its graphics and innovation, but criticized its steep learning curve stemming from its complex controls.

== Gameplay ==
The gameplay is very different from most third-person shooters, due to a unique dual analog control scheme, which is the main contributor to the steep learning curve of the game. Players travel to various worlds investigating the disappearance of several colonies, with only giant, mutated, insectoid creatures left behind. These insectoids comprise the bulk of the enemies players face along the way.

Players control Kelly or Saburouta with both analog sticks, the left controlling forward/backward movement and turning, while the right aims their weapons, and when clicked, allows quick turns. Clicking in the left stick while pointing in a direction causes the character to boost. The left trigger is a boost/jump, and when combined with the left analog boost, can be strung together into combos to keep the player off the ground entirely, which is a necessity for some levels. Face buttons are used to select weapons, and the right trigger fires the selected weapon.

The game comprises ten levels, the story unfolding via text between levels, or the occasional in-game cutscene. At the beginning of most levels, excluding boss battles, players have the choice of picking either Kelly or Saburouta. Kelly's primary weapon is fast but weaker, and she's overall faster and more maneuverable. Saburouta is slower, has more limited maneuverability in the air, and carries a stronger primary weapon, the Matchlock Cannon. Basically the two characters make up the two difficulty settings, with Kelly being the "Normal", and Saburouta being the "Advanced" setting. The real difference being that Kelly's style allowed several lock-on targets, while Saburouta's weapon splashed and was aimed at specific targets. Because of this, Kelly's gameplay is more frantic and requires less direct focus, while Saburota required specific aiming and direct attacks to be effective. Kelly is also the only character to upgrade her gearskin.

The artistic style of the game is similar to the steampunk subgenre of fiction, but the game's designers prefer to call it "elec-punk," described as a step even further, with the harnessing of electricity for imaginative new uses. The game's stages are divided into indoor mechanical-looking levels, with many gears and ornate metalwork, and outdoor stages, set in very organic-looking valleys, craters, and other fantastic otherworldly locations.

== Plot ==
The game takes place in an alternate history in 1906 where the British Empire rules all of Earth and several extrasolar colony worlds, powered by technology brought to the planet by Halley's Comet in 1835. An unknown substance known as Halley's Core was found throughout the world, and certain individuals who came in contact with it and gained superhuman abilities became known as "Halley's Chosen." The first of these was a scientist named Dr. Hebble Gate, who was affected by the comet while in his mother's womb. With his superhuman mind he harnessed the power of Halley's Core and discovered a wide range of scientific breakthroughs, including fusion and nuclear power, genetic engineering, computers, space travel and countless others. With these technologies the British Empire quickly conquered the earth, and Gate is famous as the man responsible. A complete mystery to all, Gate also holds great power over economic, political and military affairs, and is the founder of the Hebble Foundation and the GunValkyrie (GV) Organization, composed of Halley's Chosen throughout the world to prevent the misuse of technology. He suddenly disappears, throwing the world into shock, and has been missing for four years by the time the game begins.

In addition to his disappearance, the residents of the colonized planet of Tir na Nog have also disappeared, with an outbreak of large alien creatures that resemble giant insects in their place. It is also believed that before his disappearance, Gate was conducting research on how to strengthen the colonists through genetic modification, and it is speculated that the insects and colonists are one and the same.

In response, members of an elite military force within the GV organization, known as "Team Dolphin" (established 1887) is sent to investigate Gate's disappearance as well as the situation on Tir na Nog. Leading the investigation is Gate's only daughter, Lieutenant Meridian Poe, who survives on a life support system developed by her father after he surgically removed her head and disappeared with her body. The two playable characters are Kelly O'Lenmey, born in Ballymun, Ireland, a collected idealist who once aided the Irish Republic in their fight for independence until their methods caused her to leave and join the GV, and Saburouta Mishima, born in Kyushu, Japan, an exiled Samurai of the Meiji Restoration who was saved by the GV after he was unjustly sentenced to capital punishment.

Dr. Gate's fate at the end of the game is left ambiguous, as the Poe's Report documents presented throughout the game reveal that a body was eventually discovered, but its identity is not confirmed.

== Development ==
GunValkyrie was originally developed for the Sega Dreamcast by Smilebit. Its visual style was very similar to the final Xbox version. The Dreamcast version's distinguishing feature was that during the game's development, GunValkyrie utilized a unique control scheme using both a light gun and a controller. This control scheme was dropped when development shifted to the Xbox version.

The game's soundtrack, composed by Teruhiko Nakagawa and Tatsuyuki Maeda, was also marketed during the game's release. It was during this time period that TokyoPop was publishing Sega soundtrack releases in the United States, including GunValkyrie, Virtua Fighter 4, Panzer Dragoon Orta and the Sonic Adventure 2 Official Soundtrack. GunValkyrie Official Soundtrack was released on April 2, 2002. Unusually, and in contrast to the titles mentioned above, a soundtrack CD for the game was not released in Japan.

== Reception ==
Reception

Aggregate score
Aggregator	Score
Metacritic	73/100

Review score
Publication	Score
Famitsu	8/10, 8/10, 8/10, 8/10

Gunvalkyrie was released in Japan on March 21, 2002. In Japan, during the week of the release, the game sold 6000 units becoming the only Xbox game to make it to the top 30 best-selling video games. Metacritic scored the game a 73 out of 100 based on 28 critic reviews, indicating "mixed or average reviews". It was a runner-up for GameSpot's annual "Most Disappointing Game on Xbox" award, which went to ToeJam & Earl III.

In 2009, GamesRadar included it among the games "with untapped franchise potential", and commenting on the game's difficulty: "a true gaming workout, but few games in the Xbox library were as beautiful to look at or more rewarding to play."
