= Panzer Dragoon Orta =

2002 video game

- North American cover art featuring protagonist Orta and her dragon
- Developer: Smilebit
- Publisher: Sega
- Director: Akihiko Mukaiyama
- Producer: Takayuki Kawagoe
- Designer: Takashi Iwade
- Programmer: Takashi Atsu
- Artists: Takashi Iwade; Kentaro Yoshida
- Writers: Shigeru Kurihara; Kenichiro Ishii
- Composers: Saori Kobayashi; Yutaka Minobe
- Series: Panzer Dragoon
- Platform: Xbox
- Release: JP: 19 December 2002; NA: 14 January 2003; PAL: 21 March 2003
- Genre: Rail shooter
- Mode: Single-player

Panzer Dragoon Orta (Note: Pantsā Doragūn Oruta (Japanese: パンツァードラグーン オルタ)) is a 2002 rail shooter game developed by Smilebit and published by Sega for the Xbox. The fourth Panzer Dragoon game, it was released in Japan in 2002 and in North America and Europe in 2003. The story follows a girl, Orta, who is freed by a dragon and embarks on a quest to prevent the abuse of ancient technology. The gameplay features the player moving an aiming reticle and shooting enemies while the dragon flies through 3D environments on a predetermined track.

Production of Orta began in 2001. The previous Panzer Dragoon development team, Team Andromeda, had disbanded after the release of Panzer Dragoon Saga (1998). Around a dozen staff returned to work on Orta, including the artists Takashi Iwade and Kentaro Yoshida, the composer Saori Kobayashi and the battle designer Akihiko Mukaiyama, who directed Orta. While the greater power of the Xbox allowed for more freedom in gameplay and graphical design, the production was troubled by a lack of art design direction and problems with the team's graphical and gameplay ambitions.

Panzer Dragoon Orta received critical acclaim, with praise for its gameplay and art design. Several publications have named it one of the best Xbox games, and it is remembered favorably for its gameplay and technical achievements. Panzer Dragoon staff have voiced mixed feelings regarding Orta for its continuation of the story after Saga. Orta was the final Panzer Dragoon game until the 2020 remake of the original Panzer Dragoon.

== Gameplay ==
Orta and her dragon in combat, targeting a swarm of enemies

Panzer Dragoon Orta is a single-player rail shooter which spans ten levels of varying lengths and difficulty, covering a variety of environments and each housing a boss. Gameplay consists of the player controlling the protagonist Orta and her dragon, navigating levels through an aiming reticle that can be moved over the whole screen; while the player's path is predetermined, alternate routes can be opened based on in-game actions. The story is communicated though a combination of CGI and real-time cutscenes and dialogue during gameplay, with in-game speech using the fictional language of Panzer Dragoon with subtitles.

The player has a 360-degree field of view and can look ahead, left, right, and behind the dragon. Enemies come from all directions, varying in size and health, and appear on an on-screen radar that monitors the dragon's surroundings. The player can fly around some enemies in 90-degree increments, allowing them to avoid enemy fire and target specific areas. The two forms of attack are Orta's blaster, which uses a free aim mode for continuous fire, and the dragon's lock-on attack, which fires at a limited number of targets at once. There is no ammunition limit, and both free-aiming and lock-on attacks can be used simultaneously. The "Berserk" attack, powered by a gauge that fills up when enemies are shot down, deals high damage to surrounding enemies while making the dragon invulnerable for its duration. Alongside standard flight, the dragon has a "Glide" function: limited by an automatically recharging gauge, the dragon can accelerate and decelerate around enemies, with acceleration dealing damage if it collides with an enemy.

Another element of combat is the dragon's ability to morph between three forms. These are Base Wing, the standard attack type which balances between offensive and defensive abilities; Heavy Wing, which is limited to the lock-on attack but has high defense; and Glide Wing, which has low defense and no lock-on but features an increased free aim attack. Fully destroying waves of enemies grants a resource called "Gene Base" that upgrades the current dragon form's attributes, such as health and attack power. At the end of each level, the player is scored on kill count, damage received, and the time taken to clear the stage boss. If the player is defeated, they receive a game over and must restart from the beginning of a level or the beginning of the boss stage.

Completing the main campaign unlocks an extras menu called "Pandora's Box", a feature which returns from Panzer Dragoon II Zwei. Content is unlocked by clearing various conditions, such as clearing the campaign on a certain difficulty or with a high kill ratio. The content includes a detailed encyclopedia of the game world, a bestiary of defeated enemies, an archive of concept art, story cutscenes for Orta, selected CGI sequences from earlier Panzer Dragoon games, and a port of the original Panzer Dragoon. The most prominent features are additional chapters focusing on different characters, playing out as short gameplay clips with some using visual novel-style story segments.

== Plot ==
Orta takes place in a post-apocalyptic world where humans struggle to survive amidst an ecosystem of bio-engineered mutants, remnants of a devastating war. One faction, the Empire, had unearthed weapons from the pre-war Ancient Age, only to be brought low by the appearance of the Dragon of Destruction. The dragon and its previous riders destroyed the Towers, centers of the Ancients' technology, and broke the Ancients' hold on the world during the events of Panzer Dragoon Saga. Since then, the Empire has rebuilt itself, breeding dragon-like creatures called "dragonmares" as an aerial army with the help of an Ancient ruin called the Cradle. A girl named Orta, thought by some to be the daughter of Saga protagonists Edge and Azel, is kept prisoner in a tower by a tribe called the Seekers, as they fear she is a harbinger of doom. Orta is freed when the Empire attacks the Seekers' city with their dragonmares in search of Orta, due to her potential heritage, and she escapes by riding on the current incarnation of the Dragon of Destruction.

During her escape, Orta encounters Abadd, an Ancient Age android known as a "drone", who is also fleeing the Empire and offers to help her find her origins in exchange for access to Ancient Age technology. She is befriended by a tribe called the Worm Riders, who are taming the land's mutants. After an Imperial fleet attacks the Worm Riders, Abbad leads Orta to a ruin linked to the Ancients' Sestren Network, where Orta receives a posthumous message from Azel asking her to help restore the world. Abadd reveals that he plans to wipe out humanity and hoped to use Orta's DNA to breed a new drone army; when she refuses to cooperate, he attacks her and is fought off. Orta goes to the Empire's capital and destroys the Cradle; Abadd turns the dragonmares against their human controllers, but they are destroyed with the Worm Riders' aid. Orta then defeats Abadd and his dragon born from the Cradle. The Dragon of Destruction succumbs to its wounds, but post-credits scenes reveal that the dragon left a child, with the final scene showing Orta and the newborn dragon traveling through a rejuvenated landscape.

A side story unlocked during the campaign follows Iva Demilcol, the son of an Imperial soldier who was killed during Orta's escape. Iva is given his father's necklace and learns that his father worked on dragonmare production as a means of crafting medicine to treat Iva's chronic illness. The declining Iva is taken in by Seekers, forming a close bond with one of their number called Emid, who helps him find a final message from his father in the necklace. When the Empire attacks again, Emid helps Iva locate a supposed Seeker weapon. Iva activates it, revealing it to be a non-lethal repellent against mutants, with it also prompting the Seeker and Imperial soldiers to stop fighting.

== Development ==
The Panzer Dragoon series saw moderate commercial success on the Sega Saturn. After the release of Panzer Dragoon Saga (1998), Sega restructured its departments, and the Panzer Dragoon studio, Team Andromeda, disbanded. Several Team Andromeda members left Sega, including the series creator Yukio Futatsugi and the artists Manabu Kusunoki and Kentaro Yoshida. A new Panzer Dragoon was pitched for Sega's next console, the Dreamcast, but the console did not meet the technical requirements. There was also a feeling that the original trilogy for the Saturn had reached its logical conclusion.

Following the commercial failure of the Dreamcast, Sega left the console market and began developing and publishing games for other platforms, including extensively supporting Microsoft's Xbox. Discussions about a new Panzer Dragoon began in 2000. Takayuki Kawagoe, who became the producer, felt the Xbox was powerful enough to fulfil his vision for a new game in the series. It was originally proposed as Panzer Dragoon Vier, with "Vier" being German for "Four", but was given a different title to distance it from the other games.

Akihiko Mukaiyama, who had worked on Saga as battle planner, made his debut as a director with Orta. Kawagoe approached Mukaiyama first about the project. Mukaiyama initially declined, but he was repeatedly approached and told that the game would not be made if he were not involved. Not wanting that responsibility on him, Mukaiyama agreed to direct. Once the project was approved, the team pitched it to Microsoft, who agreed due to Sega's previous Xbox support.

Development began in early 2001 at Sega's new studio Smilebit and lasted eighteen months. Kawagoe said that ten members of Team Andromeda worked on the game, with other members advising them while working on other projects. In a different interview, Mukaiyama said there were seven development and five sound staff carried over from Team Andromeda, comprising twelve of the thirty staff at the time. Several members joined because of their love for the series. Takashi Atsu, a series newcomer, was a lead programmer. Takashi Iwade was both the lead designer and a lead programmer alongside Atsu. At its peak, the team comprised fifty people.

=== Design ===
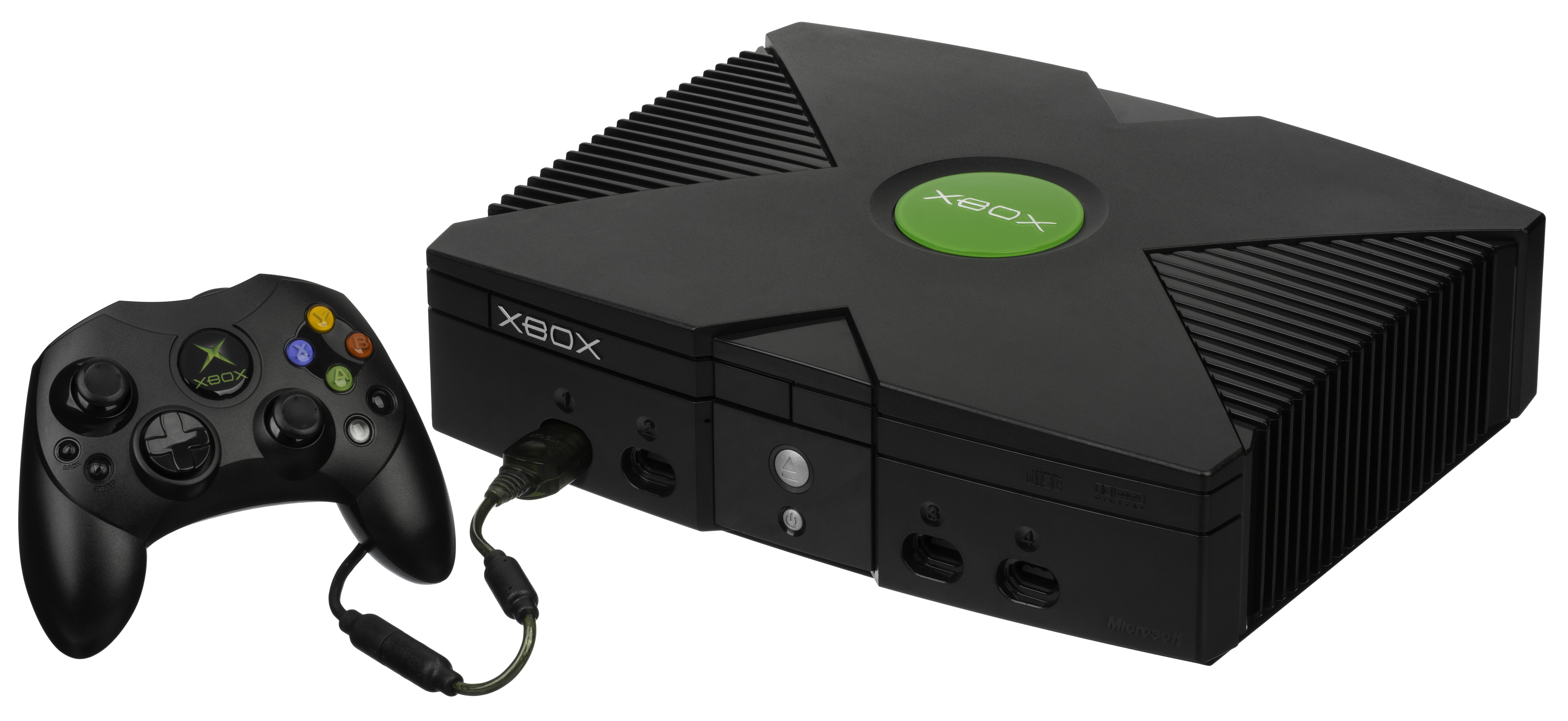
After leaving the console market, Sega gave extensive third-party support to the Xbox, with Panzer Dragoon Orta taking advantage of its increased processing power.

Mukaiyama conceived Orta as a rail shooter, although Kawagoe noted they considered other genres. In a later interview, Mukaiyama said two pitches were created for Orta, one a rail shooter and the other a strategy game with online elements. Kawagoe picked the rail shooter pitch, feeling it best communicated the story and world. The team aimed to create a game accessible to both newcomers and fans, expanding upon the Panzer Dragoon universe rather than reimagining it.

Smilebit had been working with the Xbox hardware for their 2002 games Jet Set Radio Future and Gunvalkyrie, and it compared favorably with PC hardware of the time. They also had experience with DirectX through their work on PC ports of Sega games, so they quickly understood the hardware. Yoshida had hoped for characters to fly into clouds, similar to scenes from the 1986 film Castle in the Sky, but as they were instructed in the console by the programmers they found this was not possible. While expressing interest in Xbox Live, Microsoft's online gaming service, Mukaiyama wanted the team to focus on making a polished single-player experience.

During the planning phase, the team looked at the first two Panzer Dragoon games with a view to expand on them, but, according to Mukaiyama, they were hesitant to simply repeat what had been done before. One developer, Masayoshi Kikuchi, played both games extensively and offered feedback so the designers could refine Orta's design. The team wanted to combine gameplay elements from all three previous Panzer Dragoon games. The real-time dragon morphing mechanic had been cut from Saga due to the Saturn's technical limitations, but the Xbox allowed its inclusion in combat. Movement around a 360-degree axis while shooting was included to distinguish Orta from other rail shooters. Mukaiyama has said that this caused friction within the team, as the programming staff felt free movement was wrong for a rail shooter.

Dragon morphing was included to create variety and tactical depth for players, but it required extensive trial and error to feel natural. Mukaiyama derived the morphing system from the character swapping mechanic of Magic Knight Rayearth (1995). The system required two different interacting morphing systems for the dragon's internal bone structure and its external appearance; this was complicated by the additional need to alter texture mapping. The morphing animations were initially much longer, but they were shortened after feedback. Sega of America requested more content, against the team's expectations for the rail shooter genre. Mukaiyama decided to push for ten levels despite designer protests that it was impossible, reused the series' recurring Pandora's Box system to offer bonus stages, and added difficulty modes while keeping it challenging overall. The aim was to prompt players to understand and use the game systems. Kawagoe felt that they had mostly created the game as planned. A notable extra was a port of the original Panzer Dragoon, which was converted from that game's Windows port by its original programmer Kazuhisa Hasuoka. The Windows port was used instead of a direct port from the Saturn version due to difficulties with the original's complex source code.

=== Art and graphics ===
With a background in role-playing games rather than shooters, Mukaiyama initially had trouble adjusting to his role as director, as his usual approach of designing game mechanics first was leading to a game that was not fun to play. During early demos, it saw mixed reactions from players. As development progressed, Mukaiyama realized that Orta was missing the trademark presentation and aesthetic style which had made the Panzer Dragoon series stand out, resulting in broad redesigns. There was also tension between the new staff, as represented by Mukaiyama, and the Saga veterans, particularly due to Mukaiyama's negative feedback on early art and creature designs being too similar to earlier games. This caused a deadlock between the staff, worsened when Mukaiyama wanted to bring Yoshida back on board, as Iwade felt his ability in the job was being questioned. When Yoshida joined, he and Iwade were able to work out their differences and divide the workload efficiently, smoothing the development process. To facilitate staff communication and allow for greater communal input on game and art design, a private forum was set up for posting sketches and concept ideas.

Iwade, a visual effects artist on earlier Panzer Dragoon games, became art director for Orta. The team wanted to preserve and honor the work of artist Manabu Kusunoki, who had helped define the series' visual identity. The art design drew from both the earlier Panzer Dragoon games and the photography of National Geographic. Following positive reactions to cel shading for Jet Set Radio (2000) and its sequel, the Orta team considered a cel-based graphic design, but ultimately chose realistic graphics as earlier series entries had attempted. Orta's dragon was designed by Masaharu Nakayama, while enemy designs were handled by Iwade, Ryuta Ueda and Koichiro Tamura. Tamura was also in charge of concept art. Both Ueda, a series veteran who had worked on Zwei and Saga, and Iwade created dragon designs which were rejected by Mukaiyama as too similar to dragons from earlier games. This resulted in Nakayama being brought in, and tensions developed between Iwade and Mukaiyama over the rejected proposals. Yoshida's directive from Mukaiyama was to "make a great picture", managing to work with Iwade to bring the art design back on track.

Yoshida noted that the Xbox's improved hardware meant the hand-tailored design forced by the Saturn's limitations became unnecessary; this, together with the increased team size for Orta, had changed the graphics development process enough that some of the series' original atmosphere was lost. In a separate interview, Mukaiyama said the team wasn't overly concerned with preserving that continuity, viewing Orta as a fresh start for the series; the new hardware allowed for previously impossible things, such as rendering real-time sandstorms. There was a prolonged trial-and-error period when creating character models, particularly with Orta and how her clothing and hair moved. Maquettes were created for the dragons, both during their early design phases and for their final designs. The maquettes gave the modeling and movie teams a solid reference for character models. The graphics, handled by Atsu and Iwade, were designed to be cutting edge for the time.

Autodesk 3ds Max was used to configure real-time textures, a decision informed by its ease of use and the team being familiar with it from earlier Dreamcast and Xbox projects. The animation was created using Softimage 3D. Orta's model was created in Metasequoia, while all the other characters and creatures used 3ds Max and Softimage 3D. Rather than using motion capture, the models were animated by hand based on each character and creature's appearance. Several programs were created by Smilebit for managing the graphics: an event editor handled story cutscenes, a particle editor managed in-game special effects such as dragon fire and explosions, a motion design application to calculate and manage model movement, and an after-effects tool to manage and layer effects. Multiple layers for in-game texture maps and lighting were made possible using the Xbox software, with particular care taken to make the sky domes appear realistic. The CGI opening and story cutscenes, together with CGI promotional materials, were created by Buildup Entertainment. The opening cinematic, showing the dragon attack that frees Orta, was the most complex scene to animate. From storyboarding to the final product took six months to complete. A CGI opening was picked over real-time to keep with series tradition of having CGI openings.

=== Story ===
Compared to the desolate and post-apocalyptic setting of earlier games, Orta was set during a period where the world was rebuilding and life was returning. The narrative's dramatic style was inspired by unspecified American films. A theme in common with the earlier games was neither side being specifically good or evil, but defending their goals and mission, revealing the negative consequences of fighting. While previous Panzer Dragoon games had focused on male characters, Orta was given a female lead to represent the change in direction and new style. Orta was voiced by Yōko Honna, and Abadd by Shirō Saitō. Maaya Sakamoto reprised her role as Azel from Saga.

The story was co-written by Shigeru Kurihara and Kenichiro Ishii. Kurihara was creating the draft and Masaykui Goto creating cutscene storyboards before the art design had been finalized and the Xbox's hardware limitations were known. Three months were dedicated to creating the story, communicated through the CGI cutscenes, with their storyboards influencing both artistic redesigns for Orta and the motion of characters in-game. Alongside the main story, several side stories were included as unlockables, with the team putting in as many as they could within the development time; Mukaiyama remembered one story about a prominent side character that had to be cut, saying he would like to incorporate it into a potential sequel. Mukaiyama attributed the inclusion of sub-stories told from other perspectives to Smilebit's experience making Hundred Swords (2001), which included a similar feature.

Pre-release interviews and previews stated that Orta was a sequel to the other Panzer Dragoon games and set decades after the events of Saga, though several staff later admitted the continuation of the story from Saga left them uneasy or conflicted. An ambiguous point was Orta's possible origin as the daughter of Edge and Azel, with team members sharing differing opinions. Kusunoki felt that Orta could be an alternate timeline where Edge lived and fathered Orta, while in his opinion Edge would have died during the end of Saga. Mukaiyama attributed his mixed feelings about continuing the storyline to the ending of Saga, purposefully leaving Orta's origins ambiguous and noting that the North American localizers made the overall story even more ambiguous. He hinted that Orta was possibly an alternate story or prequel to Saga, noting that there was no definitive answer among the team members. In addition to being the lead character's name, the title Orta had multiple meanings. In the in-universe language, it was translated as "rebirth" and "dawn" and tied into the story's themes. A similar word in German refers to the tip of a sword, while Mukaiyama later described it as a play on the word "alter", short for "alternative".

=== Music ===
The music for Orta was principally composed by Saori Kobayashi, returning from Saga. Additional tracks were composed by Yutaka Minobe of Wavemaster, who had worked as a composer and arranger on Skies of Arcadia (2000). The sound producer was Panzer Dragoon veteran Tomonori Sawada. As she loved the Panzer Dragoon universe, Kobayashi felt honored to return. Work on the music began in 2002. Compared to the trial-and-error work done with Saga to fit the Saturn's hardware limitations, Kobayashi had greater freedom on Xbox hardware. By this point, she had become a freelance composer, so had less direct access to materials to provide inspiration. The music retained her established ethnic-influenced elements, continuing from the soundtracks for Zwei and Saga. There was minimal interaction with the rest of the staff, with Kobayashi being given story details and level plans to create tracks. She had great freedom when creating the score, although the change in genre and issues with the team during production proved stressful. It was also her first time writing music for the rail shooter genre.

The soundtrack's overall them was portraying Orta's feelings. Comparing her musical approaches for Saga and Orta, Kobayashi said that while she allowed the music to fade out in Saga, for Orta the music had a definitive conclusion reflecting the narrative's tone. She was able to have greater musical variety compared to Saga. The ending theme, "Anu Orta Veniya", was performed by Eri Itō, with chorus work by Yumiko Takahashi. Takahashi, known for her work on the Suikoden series, was a fan of Kobayashi's work and Kobayashi asked her to perform vocals for Orta shortly after meeting her. The song lyrics were written by Kurihara and performed in the fictional language of the Panzer Dragoon universe. The track was arranged by Hayato Matsuo, who felt it important to emphasize the vocals while blending them with orchestral and "ethnic rhythm sections". Both Itō and Matsuo had worked in the same roles for the Saga ending theme. Kobayashi fondly remembered her work on both Orta and Saga, saying it gave her opportunities for mixing orchestral and electronic elements in music.

A soundtrack album for CD was published by Marvelous Entertainment on 27 December 2002, featuring all the game's tracks, in addition to an instrumental version of "Anu Orta Veniya". The soundtrack booklet also included a Japanese lyric translation of "Anu Orta Veniya". An English release was published by Tokyopop on 21 January 2003; this release also included the title theme of Panzer Dragoon, the theme "Lagi and Lundi" from Zwei, and the Saga ending theme "Sona Mi Areru Ec Sanctitu". Selected tracks were included in an album of Xbox game music published by 5pb on 24 March 2006. The original Japanese album was released digitally worldwide on 14 February 2018 alongside the other Panzer Dragoon soundtracks to celebrate the 20th anniversary of Saga.

== Release ==
An Xbox Panzer Dragoon was announced in March 2001 as part of a multi-game deal between Sega and Microsoft. Prior to its reveal, it was referred to as "Panzer Dragoon (Latest Version)" and "Panzer Dragoon Next". It was first shown under its final title at E3 2002. Originally scheduled for a worldwide release in 2002, it was delayed into 2003 in the West to better tie the story and gameplay, add additional branching paths, and continue polishing. Mukaiyama said the graphics were taking longer to design than anticipated, needing to adjust to new technology and to refine gameplay and level design, which were turning out below expectations. Orta and design models for the dragon creatures were exhibited at the "Character Expo", a media event held in Minami-Aoyama in November 2002 to promote different media projects. An additional promotional campaign allowed fans to enter a competition with themed hoodies as prizes, with the campaign revolving around understanding words in the fictional language used in a television commercial.

Orta was released in Japan on 19 December 2002. The limited edition included a CD featuring arranged five-minute compilations of music from each Panzer Dragoon game. Orta was released in North America on 14 January 2003, and in Europe on 21 March. Sega published it in all regions, while Infogrames was a distribution partner in Europe. It was made backward compatible with the Xbox 360 on 19 April 2007. The European 360 version crashed after the third level, which was fixed in 2018 with a patch. Orta was made backward compatible for the Xbox One on 17 April 2018.

Sega produced 999 Orta-themed Xbox consoles for sale through their Sega Direct service; the design was pure white with a printed image based on an Ancient Age fossil. A guidebook featuring was published by ASCII Media Works on 21 February 2003. A novelization was written by Yu Godai, illustrated by Shinya Kaneko and published by Media Factory on 17 December 2004. Buildup Entertainment collaborated with Sega to release 500 cast statues of Orta and her dragon in April 2004.

== Reception ==
Reception

Aggregate score
| Aggregator | Score |
|---|---|
| Metacritic | 90/100 |

Review scores
| Publication | Score |
|---|---|
| Edge | 7/10 |
| Electronic Gaming Monthly | 9/10, 8.5/10, 9/10 |
| Eurogamer | 8/10 |
| Famitsu | 8/10, 9/10, 9/10, 9/10 (Weekly); 10/10, 10/10, 10/10, 8/10 (Xbox) |
| Game Informer | 8.25/10 |
| GamePro | 4.5/5 |
| GameSpot | 9/10 |
| GameSpy | 4/5 |
| IGN | 9.2/10 |
| Official Xbox Magazine (UK) | 8.8/10 |

Orta met with "universal acclaim", according to review aggregator website Metacritic, receiving a score of 90 out of 100 based on forty-one critic reviews. Its visual design, unlockable content, and faithfulness to the series were consistently praised, while critics were displeased with the short play-time and dated, on-rails structure. Opinions of the controls and the increased difficulty were mixed.

In their review, Famitsu gave it praise for its visuals and gameplay, positively noting both high challenge and freedom of choice for players. The dedicated sibling magazine Famitsu Xbox gave it a higher score than the main magazine, citing it as the best Xbox release to date and lauding its adaptation of the series gameplay and quality of its graphics. The three reviewers for Electronic Gaming Monthly gave it high praise, lauding its graphics, gameplay and unlockable content compared to other rail shooters of the time; common points of criticism were its high difficulty compared to earlier Panzer Dragoon games, and its short campaign. Edge felt the additional controls and variety hindered enjoyment compared to Sega's earlier rail shooter Rez, and described the music as less memorable than earlier entries, while lauding the art design and number of unlockable extras alongside nostalgia for earlier entries in the series and genre.

Eurogamer's Kristan Reed called Orta "a refined, well designed and intelligent title [marking] a real progression in the genre", with his only complaints being repetitive gameplay and a short campaign. Chet Barber of Game Informer was positive, and particularly praised the audio and art design, but noted some control problems making dodging difficult. Andrew Reiner, in a second opinion for the magazine, praised Smilebit's effort in recreating the series' original gameplay and their graphical and technical achievements on the platform, but noted a lack of innovation over earlier entries. Both critics mentioned its archaic design compared to other games of the time. Greg Kasavin, writing for GameSpot, noted the conventional gameplay but otherwise lauded Orta both compared to other series entries and other games on the Xbox at the time, citing its overall presentation and extra features as well above what other games offered in its genre.

GamePro described Orta as existing as two entities: one "a 10-stage rail shooter, an archaic and straightforward game style that's been all but shunned and forgotten in this modern era of fully immersive 3D worlds", the other "a massive sensory overload machine" due to its complex and beautiful level design. GameSpy's Christian Nutt felt Orta would appeal to both hardcore gamers, and those who appreciated music and aesthetics more due to these elements being so strongly presented, with his main complaint being pacing issues and an unoriginal if well-told story. IGN's Hilary Goldstein only felt negatively about its short length potentially turning off players compared to other recent Xbox releases, otherwise praising it as one of the best rail shooters available. Jon Ortaway of Official Xbox Magazine felt Orta was a worthy successor to the earlier Panzer Dragoon series, lauding its graphics and audio, with his main complaints being its high difficulty and harsh checkpoint system.

=== Sales ===
In Japan, Orta sold over 33,400 units by the end of 2002, according to data analysis company Media Create, finishing as the 285th-best-selling game in the region. It was considered popular enough in Japan to be re-released through Xbox's budget Platinum Collection brand. According to The NPD Group, Orta was the fifth-best-selling Xbox game in the region during January 2003. Sales were disappointing in the United Kingdom, selling roughly 10,000 units, numbers similar to two other Sega games released for the platform in the region, The House of the Dead III and ToeJam & Earl III: Mission to Earth. Orta was not mentioned in Sega's fiscal report for the financial year ending in March 2003.

=== Accolades ===
As part of its review in 2002, Famitsu gave Orta a Platinum Award, ranking it alongside Metal Gear Solid 2 Subsistance and The Legend of Zelda: The Wind Waker. It was nominated in the "Best Action Game" category in the 2003 Spike Video Game Awards, but lost to True Crime: Streets of LA. At the 2003 National Academy of Video Game Trade Reviewers awards, Orta won the "Art Direction, Cinema" award. GameSpot named it the best Xbox game of January 2003. Orta has been consistently listed as one of the best games for the original Xbox, by publications including GamesRadar, Digital Trends, and IGN, which described it as the "pinnacle of rail shooters".

== Legacy ==
Alex Wawro of Gamasutra called Orta the best Panzer Dragoon game for gameplay refinements and the technical and graphical achievements made possible by Xbox. In a 2007 series retrospective for 1Up.com, James Mielke said that Orta had aged well both mechanically and aesthetically, and was graphically equal to many games on the Xbox 360. In 2008, Joystiq said it would be a good candidate for porting to the Wii, complimenting the quality of its gameplay and graphics. In January 2011, Darren Jones of Retro Gamer said that it had aged well, predicting it would be seen as a genre classic, and that it represented the older development ideals of Sega as a risk-taking company. Orta was featured in the book 1001 Video Games You Must Play Before You Die (2010), and was selected by the Smithsonian American Art Museum for its Art of Video Games exhibition in 2011.

As part of the 1Up.com retrospective, Kawagoe and Futatsugi were interviewed. Kawagoe felt that, while the team were successful in bringing the series to a new platform, fan expectations had an impact on Orta's perception. Kawagoe also noted the development of future entries depended on fan demand. Futatsugi felt the team were held back by confining themselves to the Panzer Dragoon universe rather than designing a game based on an original concept. Later opinions from staff including Mukaiyama and Kobayashi on Orta were mixed, mainly due to how it continued the narrative past its planned conclusion in Saga. SaiTong Man, combat designer for Heavenly Sword, credited the dragon forms in Orta as an inspiration for protagonist Nariko's three combat stances.

Future Panzer Dragoon projects, ranging from a Saga sequel to a film adaptation, were dependent on reactions to Orta. (Note: Quote: As Smilebit's Takayuki Kawagoe once told us, "We have a plan for the sequel to Panzer Dragoon Saga, but whether it happens or not depends on how people respond to Orta".) The Panzer Dragoon series became dormant following Orta, a fact attributed to low sales for the series as a whole. In 2018 publisher Forever Entertainment announced remakes of the first two Panzer Dragoon games, and 2020 saw the announcement of a virtual reality game based on sequences from the first three games.
