= Panzer Dragoon II Zwei =

1996 video game

- North American cover art
- Developer: Sega (Team Andromeda)
- Publisher: Sega
- Director: Tomohiro Kondo
- Producer: Tomohiro Kondo
- Designer: Kentaro Yoshida
- Programmer: Junichi Suto
- Artist: Kentaro Yoshida
- Writers: Katsuhiko Yamada; Yukio Futatsugi
- Composer: Yayoi Wachi
- Series: Panzer Dragoon
- Platform: Sega Saturn
- Release: JP: March 22, 1996; NA: April 17, 1996; PAL: May 10, 1996
- Genre: Rail shooter
- Mode: Single-player

Panzer Dragoon II Zwei (Note: Pantsā Doragūn Tsuvai (Japanese: パンツァードラグーン ツヴァイ)) is a 1996 rail shooter game developed by Team Andromeda and published by Sega for the Sega Saturn. The second entry in the Panzer Dragoon series and a prequel to the original game, the story follows Lundi and his dragon companion, Lagi, as they pursue an airship of the Ancient Age. The player controls an aiming reticle representing the dragon's laser and Lundi's gun, shooting enemies while the dragon travels through 3D environments on a fixed track. Levels have multiple pathways, and the dragon grows stronger over the course of the game based on the player's score.

Production of Zwei began in 1995 in parallel with the role-playing video game Panzer Dragoon Saga (1998), with a small staff and little assistance from Sega. In response to player criticism of the original Panzer Dragoon, the team reduced the overall difficulty and expanded the story elements. The soundtrack, composed by Yayoi Wachi, influenced the musical direction of later entries in the series.

Zwei was acclaimed, with many critics praising it as superior to the original Panzer Dragoon. Electronic Gaming Monthly named it the 90th best console game of all time in 1997, praising its atmospheric levels and innovative gameplay. A remake for undisclosed platforms is in development by MegaPixel Studio.

== Gameplay ==
Lundi and his dragon Lagi in combat, targeting a swarm of enemies

Panzer Dragoon II Zwei is a single-player rail shooter which spans seven levels, with each after the first including a boss encounter. The story is communicated through CGI and real-time cutscenes, with in-game speech using the constructed Panzer Dragoon-universe language with subtitles. Gameplay is mostly identical to the original Panzer Dragoon; the player controls an aiming reticle for a flying dragon and its rider as they move through the level. Enemies can appear from all directions and are tracked by a radar display in the upper right corner of the screen. The reticle can be controlled with the D-pad, analog pad, or Saturn Mouse. The player can attack with either Lundi's gun or the dragon's lock-on lasers. An addition to the original game's gameplay is the Berserk attack, powered by a meter that fills up when enemies are shot down, firing homing lasers that continuously target all enemies on-screen until the meter is depleted.

The player is able to save the game between levels. The dragon's death causes a game over, forcing the player to restart from a save point. The second, third and fourth levels feature a branching route choice, with that choice impacting both the scenery and the enemy types the player encounters for the remainder of the level. Each level is scored based on enemy kill ratio, damage taken, route taken, the number of continues used, and time taken to defeat the boss. Over the course of the game, the dragon evolves into stronger forms based on the player's level-end scores. There are six forms available, with a final form unlocking for the final boss. Completing the game unlocks "Pandora's Box", an extras menu that allows players to view completion statistics, alter dragon attributes, change the game difficulty, access new weapons, alter or replay individual levels, and replay CGI cutscenes.

== Plot ==
Zwei is a prequel set prior to the events of the original Panzer Dragoon, against the backdrop of a war between the Empire and the nation of Meccania over remnants of the Ancient Age, a vanished civilization. Jean-Jacques Lundi lives in a small village whose people ride pack animals called "coolias"; mutant coolias born exhibiting bioluminescence are killed as unlucky omens. Lundi defies the village tradition by sheltering an abnormal coolia born with both a glowing green throat and wings, naming him Lagi. When the animal is fully grown, Lundi rides Lagi outside the village to try to get him to fly. While the two are out riding, an automated Ancient Age airship called Shelcoof destroys Lundi's village. Lagi fires at Shelcoof with lasers from his mouth, the trademark attack of dragons from the Ancient Age.

Lundi and Lagi pursue Shelcoof through the ruined village in parallel with the forces of the Empire, who seek to control Shelcoof. Lundi and Lagi almost reach Shelcoof, but a mysterious dragon attacks and drives them back. After they recover, Lundi and Lagi follow Shelcoof's trail while fending off attacks from indigenous beasts and Meccanian forces. The two reach Shelcoof as its monster guardians destroy the pursuing Imperial fleet. The pair destroy Shelcoof's core, then the hostile dragon which was incubating inside it.

Lagi surrounds Lundi in a force field, lifting him from the saddle and sending him to safety. Lagi attacks an approaching Imperial fleet, while Lundi sees a vision of the past and near future. Lundi walks through the wreckage of Shelcoof to find a carving of a dragon similar to Lagi, and declares that Lagi lives on in his memory.

== Development ==
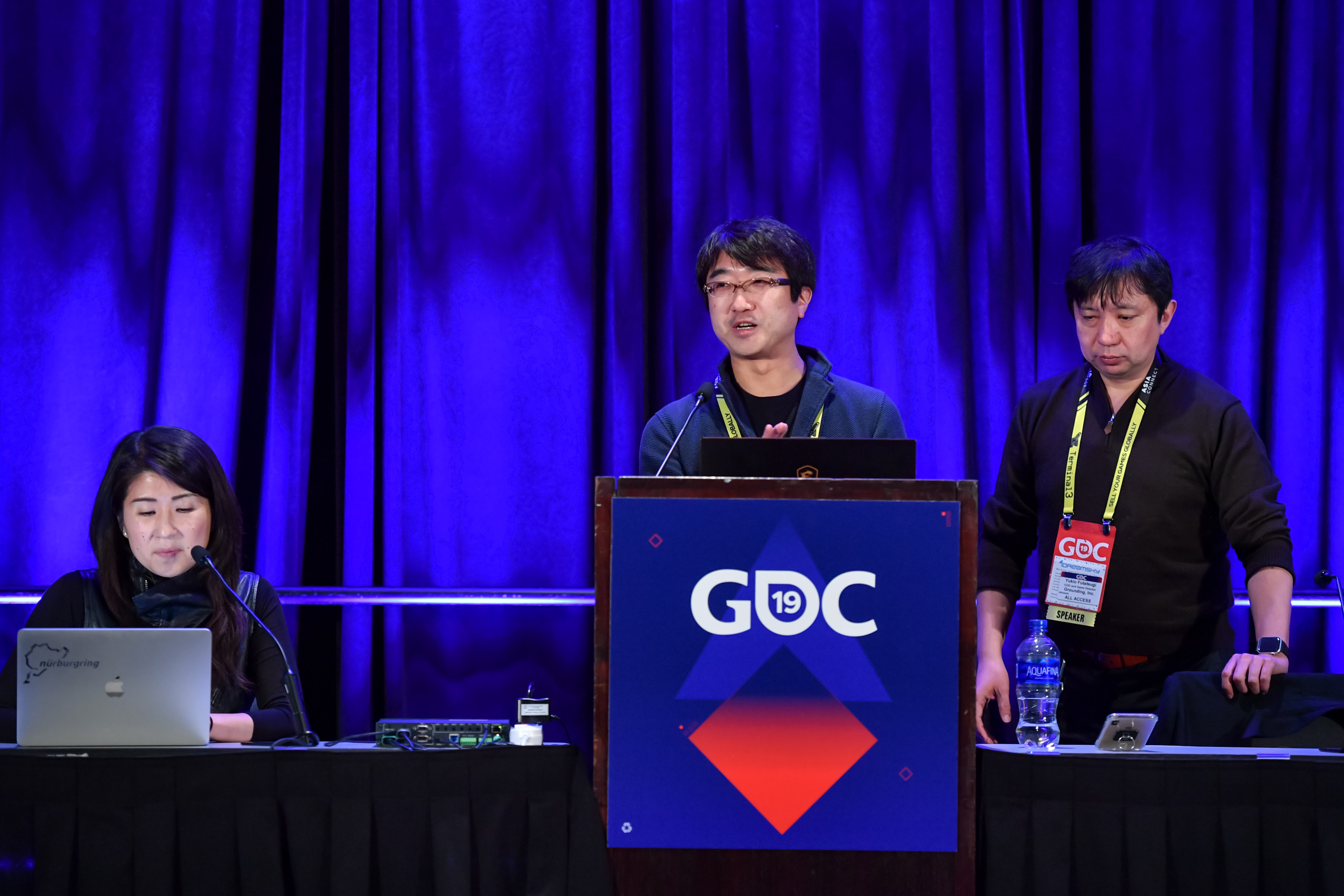
Series creator Yukio Futatsugi (far right) and lead artist Kentaro Yoshida (center) were both involved in the production of Zwei.

Panzer Dragoon II Zwei was developed by Team Andromeda, a production team at Sega led by Yukio Futatsugi. Encouraged by the success of the first Panzer Dragoon (1995), Sega began planning two sequels for the Saturn: the rail shooter Zwei, and the role-playing video game Panzer Dragoon Saga (1998). Concern at the Saturn's poor sales gave the team the sense that they would need to hurry to complete the series within the system's lifetime. After the story groundwork was laid for Zwei and the overall narrative direction had been decided, Team Andromeda split into two teams to work on both projects. Zwei and Saga were meant to share team members, but due to the work overload this created, Saga was put on hold until Zwei was completed. Compared to the later large size of the Saga team, Zwei was developed by a small team where everybody knew each other.

Development of Zwei began in mid-1995, several months after Panzer Dragoon was released. The aim was to expand upon the gameplay of the original game and improve its technical performance with a higher frame rate and smoother visuals. As they used the first game's engine, production took less than twelve months.

Tomohiro Kondo, a senior member of Team Andromeda, was the producer and director. Series creator Yukio Futatsugi originally oversaw both projects' narratives, but as his attention shifted onto Saga, Zwei's story became the responsibility of Katsuhiko Yamada. He is co-credited with the original design and setting. Kentaro Yoshida was the art director and designer, with art contributions and oversight from Manabu Kusunoki, the artist for the first Panzer Dragoon. Yoshida also acted as team lead on the game. One of the new artists was Ryuta Ueda, who later worked on Jet Set Radio as art director. The enemy models were designed by Takashi Iwade, who also created the ship bosses and designed the game's logo. Junichi Suto was the main programmer, with Hitoshi Nakanishi as a second programmer. The CGI cutscenes were handled by Yoshida, Kusunoki, Kazuyuki Iwasawa and Katsumi Yokota, with Yokota also creating the ending credits illustrations. Overall the team consisted of between fifteen and twenty people.

Futatsugi designed Zwei as a prequel, creating a thread which would run from Zwei through Panzer Dragoon and into Saga through the growing emotional connection between rider and dragon. The central story concept for Zwei was the raising of the dragon to the point where it could fly and fight on its own. The scenario was in part intended to set up the events of Saga. Lundi and the Emperor were voiced by Shigeru Nakahara and Ryūzaburō Ōtomo; as with the original game, the dialogue is in the fictional language of the Panzer Dragoon world. The art design again drew inspiration from the work of Jean Giraud, with the protagonist designed to be normal and ordinary in contrast to the exaggerated designs of many Japanese game protagonists. The Emperor's design was inspired by Harkonnen, a main antagonist of the novel Dune. The overall artistic tone became darker at Kusunoki's suggestion, with Yoshida attributing Ueda with creating the "more dynamic" boss designs.

In response to criticisms of Panzer Dragoon, Team Andromeda made Zwei less difficult and more story-intensive. The aiming system was redesigned, with the dragon positioned in the lower part of the screen so aiming and seeing enemy fire was less difficult. The branching paths were implemented as a compromise to allow repeat playthroughs without the difficulty implemented in the original. The planned RPG systems of Saga were also referenced in Zwei with the branching paths and dragon evolution. The different dragon forms were suggested by Futatsugi. The ground-based gameplay was incorporated to accentuate the feeling of flight. At Kondo's suggestion, the difficulty was managed by an in-game system dubbed "ADEC" (automatic difficulty enemy control), which adjusted enemy spawn levels and rates of fire based on the player's performance and the number of continues. The Pandora's Box mode was created by a single programmer and it was included later in development after getting the team's approval.

The team was more familiar with the Saturn hardware than when developing the original game, and so were able to incorporate new technical elements. The team received no help from Sega's technical division, and did not use any Sega-developed tools such as the Sega Graphics Library operating system; instead, Team Andromeda's programmers created their own development tools. The transition from ground to air was difficult to display, as the Saturn could only show one scrolling layer, so the team made use of camera transitions to mask the change. A notable element was the water effects, which were created using a combination of parallax scrolling and layers, allowing a look impossible on the 3D-focused PlayStation without exceeding the hardware limits of the Saturn. According to Yoshida, the team went through multiple dragon designs, with the final visuals chosen by Kusunoki. The dragons were inspired by different creatures and machines from classic science fiction. The programmers kept segmented wooden fish on their desks so they could reproduce lifelike movements for creatures in the game. Iwate had to work around the Saturn's limited 3D ability when creating the models, with Suto and Nakanishi sometimes clashing with Iwate over his complex models and movements when they tried to run them on Saturn hardware.

=== Music ===
The branching path system in Zwei meant that the precise scoring of the original game was impossible. So, rather than using prerecorded music, the soundtrack is mostly generated via pulse-code modulation by the Saturn's hardware. Music composition was led by Yayoi Wachi. Additional tracks were composed by Tomonori Sawada, Junko Shiratsu, and Teruhiko Nakagawa. In contrast to the purely orchestral and electronic score of the first game, Zwei added ethnic elements. Panzer Dragoon Saga composer Saori Kobayashi credited Wachi's shift away from the first game's musical style with shaping her future compositions for the series. A soundtrack album was published by PolyGram on April 25, 1996. An arrange album created in collaboration music company Cube, Panzer Dragoon II Zwei Original Arrange Album "Alternative Elements", was published by NEC Avenue on April 21. The original Japanese album was released digitally worldwide on February 14, 2018, alongside the other Panzer Dragoon soundtracks to celebrate the 20th anniversary of Saga.

== Release ==
Panzer Dragoon II Zwei was announced in Japan and teased at the promotional event "Toshimaen VS Sega Saturn" in December 1995. Production was said to be 30% complete by January 1996. In the West the finished game was shown at E3 1996. Zwei was released on March 22 of that year in Japan, on April 17 in North America, and on May 10 in Europe. For the cover art CGI graphics were used, in contrast to the first game's Japanese cover, which was drawn by Giraud. Yoshida jokingly said this was done to save money.

A PC version was announced in 2007 and planned for release on online video game service GameTap, but GameTap closed its North American offices in 2010 and changed focus to newer PC games. GameTap staff said that Saturn emulation was difficult, speaking in reference to a planned PC port of Saga that likewise never saw release due to GameTap's closure in 2015.

Following the releases of Saga for the Saturn and Panzer Dragoon Orta (2002) for the Xbox, the series went dormant due to low overall sales, with Sega licensing out later projects. Remakes of both Panzer Dragoon and Zwei were announced in 2018, published by Forever Entertainment and developed by their internal MegaPixel Studio under license from Sega. The Zwei remake was originally announced for a 2021 release date, but in June of that year it was postponed to an unspecified date. Scenes from Zwei are also planned for Panzer Dragoon Voyage Record, a virtual reality rail shooter based on sequences from the first three Panzer Dragoon games.

== Reception ==
Reception

Aggregate score
Aggregator	Score
GameRankings	88%

Review scores
Publication	Score
Electronic Gaming Monthly	8/10, 8.5/10, 8.5/10, 8/10
Famitsu	9/10, 8/10, 10/10, 8/10
Game Informer	9/10
Next Generation	4/5
Entertainment Weekly	A
Maximum	5/5
Sega Saturn Magazine	95%

Panzer Dragoon II Zwei was critically acclaimed upon release, with a score of 88% on the review aggregation site GameRankings based on five reviews. The four reviewers of Electronic Gaming Monthly praised its multiple routes, differing dragon transformations, and "some of the best graphics ever seen" on the Saturn. However, they felt that the low difficulty damaged the longevity. GamePro wrote that Panzer Dragoon II Zwei "blows away anything resembling a shooter on the PlayStation thus far, in both graphics and imagination." The reviewer felt that the game was too easy, but that the multiple paths increased the replay value and made the gameplay more interesting. He also complimented the way the music reflects what is going on in the game. Entertainment Weekly deemed Zwei much more refined than the already strong original Panzer Dragoon. A reviewer for Next Generation said that while the gameplay makes only minimal innovations to the restrictive on-rails format, the game keeps the player hooked though its gorgeous visuals and absorbing story. He summarized: "In a surprising victory for art and plot direction, Panzer Dragoon II Zwei proves that visual sophistication and compelling storylines can sometimes overcome less than revolutionary gameplay."

Rob Allsetter of Sega Saturn Magazine praised the impressive attention to detail in the graphics and the multiple routes. He concluded that it "belongs up there with VF2 and Sega Rally as the standard-bearer for its genre." Maximum's Daniel Jevons concurred with Scary Larry that the game "positively laughs in the face of any competing PlayStation 3D shooters." He pointed out that the much-maligned on-rails format is necessary to create the experience the game offers, noting as an example that it allowed the developers to synchronize the soundtrack with what is going on. He also praised the animation, 3D graphics, high frame rate, absence of pixelation even on the heavily detailed bosses, precise controls, lock-on attacks, and the ability to adjust the game's difficulty by choosing different routes.

Panzer Dragoon II Zwei was a runner-up for Electronic Gaming Monthly's Shooter Game of the Year (behind Alien Trilogy) and Best Graphics of the Year (behind Super Mario 64). The following year they ranked it number 90 on their "100 Best Games of All Time", citing its atmospheric levels and evolving dragon, as well as how, like the original, it represented a true 3-D evolution for the shooter genre through the player ability to rotate the perspective. IGN staff writer Levi Buchanan ranked Panzer Dragoon II Zwei fifth in his list of the top 10 Sega Saturn games, saying that "The original Panzer Dragoon that flanked the Saturn at launch was nothing short of revelation. But this sequel improves on almost everything, offering better graphics, smoother animations, changing dragon forms, and branching routes."
