= Gangster Town =

1987 shooter video game

- Developer: Sega
- Publisher: Sega
- Platforms: Master System, Arcade
- Release: Arcade: JP: July 1987; Master System: NA: August 1987; PAL: 1987
- Genre: Shooter
- Modes: Single-player, multiplayer

Gangster Town is a light gun shooter game developed and released by Sega for the arcades and Master System console in 1987. It is set in an American city overtaken by crime during the 1920s. The player plays a Federal Bureau of Investigation agent armed with a machine gun. The goal is to rid the town of thugs.

== Release ==
The game was first released for Japan in July 1987 for Shooting Zone, a Master System-based arcade board dedicated to light gun games. Due to the aesthetics of the arcade cabinet, this version only supports a single light gun.

The game was then released overseas for the Master System console in August 1987 for the North American market. The Master System version supports the Sega Light Phaser gun peripheral. Two can be used simultaneously for cooperative play in two-player mode.

== Legacy ==
Guinness World Records recognized Gangster Town as the first light-gun rail shooter. They noted that it departed from earlier light gun shooting gallery games by moving the player on-rails through a set path filled with enemies. The car chase level has a pseudo-3D forward-scrolling perspective where the player shoots enemies as they loom into range.
