= Panzer Dragoon Saga =

1998 video game

- European cover art
- Developer: Sega (Team Andromeda)
- Publisher: Sega
- Director: Yukio Futatsugi
- Designer: Manabu Kusunoki
- Artist: Katsumi Yokota
- Composers: Saori Kobayashi; Mariko Nanba
- Series: Panzer Dragoon
- Platform: Sega Saturn
- Release: JP: 29 January 1998; EU: 17 April 1998; NA: 5 May 1998
- Genre: Role-playing
- Mode: Single-player

Panzer Dragoon Saga, known in Japan as Azel: Panzer Dragoon RPG, (Note: Azeru –Pantsā Doragūn Arupījī– (Japanese: アゼル –パンツァードラグーン RPG–)) is a 1998 role-playing video game developed by Team Andromeda and published by Sega for the Sega Saturn. It replaces the rail shooter gameplay of previous Panzer Dragoon games with RPG elements such as random encounters, semi-turn-based battles and free-roaming exploration. The player controls Edge, a young mercenary who rides a dragon and encounters a mysterious girl from a vanished civilization.

Sega directed Team Andromeda to create an RPG to compete against the PlayStation and Final Fantasy VII. Development began in early 1995 alongside Panzer Dragoon II Zwei (1996). The project was arduous and repeatedly delayed; incorporating the Panzer Dragoon shooting elements with full 3D computer graphics and voice acting, both unusual features in RPGs at the time, pushed the Saturn to its technical limits and strained team relations. Two staff members died during development, which the director, Yukio Futatsugi, attributed to stressful working conditions.

Sega released Panzer Dragoon Saga in Japan in January 1998 and in the West in April. It received little marketing, and Sega published only a few thousand copies in the West, where it had shifted focus to its next console, the Dreamcast. Saga received acclaim, with praise for its story, graphics, and combat; it was the highest-rated Saturn game on the aggregator GameRankings. Sales were low, which was attributed to the Saturn's failure, the lack of marketing, low circulation, and Team Andromeda's lack of interest in creating a mainstream product.

After the release, Sega disbanded Team Andromeda. Several staff members joined a new Sega studio, Smilebit, and developed a fourth Panzer Dragoon game, Panzer Dragoon Orta (2002), for the Xbox. Many publications have named Saga one of the greatest video games. Although it became a cult classic, it has never been rereleased and English-language copies have sold for more than US$1000.

== Gameplay ==
Unlike the other Panzer Dragoon games, which are rail shooters, Panzer Dragoon Saga is a role-playing video game (RPG). The player controls Edge, a young mercenary who rides a flying dragon.

Gameplay is divided into three types: traversing environments on the dragon, battling enemies and exploring on foot. On foot, Edge can talk to non-player characters (NPCs), upgrade his weapons, buy items such as potions, and use a targeting reticle to interact with elements such as doors and locks. When the player explores on the dragon, this reticle is used to fire lasers to activate triggers or break objects. In one sequence, Edge rides a hoverbike instead of the dragon. The environments include canyons, deserts, forests, and subterranean ruins. These are accessed from the map screen, and new areas are added as the game progresses. At campsites, players save their progress.

Saga simplifies many RPG conventions. For example, it has few travel sequences and side quests, requires little management of inventories or skill trees, and has only one playable character, Edge. It can be completed in under 20 hours, making it much shorter than most RPGs at the time.

=== Battle system ===
Edge and his dragon in combat, with the enemy's weak point exposed. Note the combat menu on the left, radar indicating safe and dangerous zones in the center, and the three action gauges, one depleted, in the bottom right.

Panzer Dragoon Saga uses a random encounter system, in which battles are triggered at random intervals as the player rides the dragon. Battles mix real-time and turn-based elements. Three "action gauges" charge in real time; when a gauge fills, the player can perform an action, such as attacking or using items. Waiting for multiple gauges to charge gives the enemy more opportunity to attack, but grants the player more options, such as making multiple moves in quick succession. The speed at which the gauges charge is governed by the dragon's agility attribute; if this is higher than the enemy's, the player can make more actions.

The player can circle the enemy by moving between quadrants to expose weak points and escape dangerous positions. A radar indicates safe, neutral and dangerous areas, with the front and rear quadrants typically posing the most danger. Changing position temporarily stops the gauges. Enemies may also change position to force the player into vulnerable areas. Weak points can sometimes be attacked only from dangerous areas, and enemy attack patterns may change mid-battle, forcing the player to adapt.

The two primary attacks are the dragon's laser, which strikes multiple targets simultaneously, and Edge's gun, which focuses on a single target and is useful for striking weak points. Edge's gun can be upgraded with power-ups including three-way fire and the "sniper" modification, which deals additional damage to weak points. The dragon's "berserks", the equivalent of magic spells in other RPGs, can heal, boost the dragon's attributes, or inflict powerful attacks. Berserks require berserk points and sometimes multiple action gauges. Certain enemy attacks change the dragon's status: "stun" prevents it from using its lasers or berserks; "stop" prevents it from changing position; "poison" slowly drains its health points; "pain" slowly drains its defense attribute; "slow" increases the gauge charge time; and "bind" prevents all but the first gauge from charging.

Players can morph the dragon to change its attack, defense, agility and spiritual attributes. Boosting one attribute diminishes another; for example, boosting the attack attribute reduces the spiritual attribute, which increases the cost of berserks, and boosting agility allows the player to move more quickly around enemies but lowers defense. Certain berserks are available only in certain dragon configurations, and the dragon learns some more quickly in different forms. After battle, the player earns a ranking based on their performance. Better rankings reward the player with more experience points and items.

== Plot ==
Edge, a mercenary hired by the Empire, guards an excavation site filled with artifacts from the Ancient Age, a vanished civilization. Fending off an ancient monster, he discovers a girl buried in a wall. The site is attacked by the mutinous Black Fleet, who seize the girl, kill Edge's companions and shoot Edge. Edge survives, escapes with the help of a mysterious flying dragon, and swears revenge on the Black Fleet leader, Craymen.

Edge rescues Gash, a member of the Seekers, a scavenger group. Gash directs him to a nomadic caravan, where he learns the location of the Black Fleet. Edge defeats the fleet on his dragon, but learns that Craymen has already reached the Tower, an ancient structure of tremendous power. He fends off an attack by the girl from the excavation site, who has sworn allegiance to Craymen and rides an enormous dragon called Atolm.

In the town of Zoah, Edge meets Paet, an engineer who offers information about the Tower in exchange for artifacts. Searching an ancient vessel for parts, Edge is captured and tortured by imperial soldiers but rescued by Gash. Paet reveals that the Tower can be reached via the ruins of Uru; there, Edge and the dragon are attacked again by the girl and Atolm. After the battle, Edge and the girl are separated from their dragons and fall into an ancient underground facility. They form a truce to escape. The girl explains that she is an ancient bio-engineered life form named Azel, created in the facility and designed to interface with ancient technology. After Edge's dragon rescues them, Azel warns Edge that she will kill him if he crosses Craymen's path again. She leaves on Atolm.

Craymen surprises Edge in Zoah and requests his help fighting the Empire. Paet tells Edge he can find the Tower by deactivating Mel-Kava, an ancient machine that obscures the Tower's location with fog. In exchange for destroying an imperial base, the Zoah leader gives Edge access to an ancient artifact that grants a vision of Mel-Kava's location. Edge and the dragon destroy Mel-Kava, clearing the fog, but are attacked again by Azel and Atolm. They shoot down Atolm and rescue Azel as she falls.

The Emperor's flagship, Grig Orig, destroys Zoah, but the Black Fleet intervenes before Edge and the dragon are killed. At the Tower, Craymen tells Edge that the Tower is one of several that manufacture monsters to combat humanity's destructive forces. He needs Azel to activate the Tower and destroy the Empire before they can use it for themselves. Imperials arrive and capture Edge and Craymen. After the Emperor forces Azel to activate the Tower, monsters emerge and kill Craymen, the Emperor and their men. Edge and Azel escape on Edge's dragon. At the Seeker stronghold, Gash explains that the Tower will destroy humanity if it is not deactivated. He believes Edge's dragon is the prophesied Divine Visitor who will be humanity's salvation. Edge and the dragon battle rampaging monsters and destroy the infested Grig Orig.

Edge rescues Azel from monsters in the Uru facility, where she has returned to contemplate her purpose. They infiltrate the Tower, and Azel prepares to transfer Edge and the dragon into Sestren, the AI network that controls the towers. She confesses her love for Edge and he promises to return. Inside Sestren, Edge and the dragon defeat the network's "anti-dragon" programs. The dragon reveals that it is not the Divine Visitor but the Heresy Program, a rogue Sestren AI; the real Divine Visitor is "the one from the outside world" who has guided Edge, and must now destroy Sestren to free humanity from the Ancient Age. Edge and the dragon vanish. Gash awaits Edge in a desert. Azel, searching for Edge, asks directions across treacherous land.

== Development ==
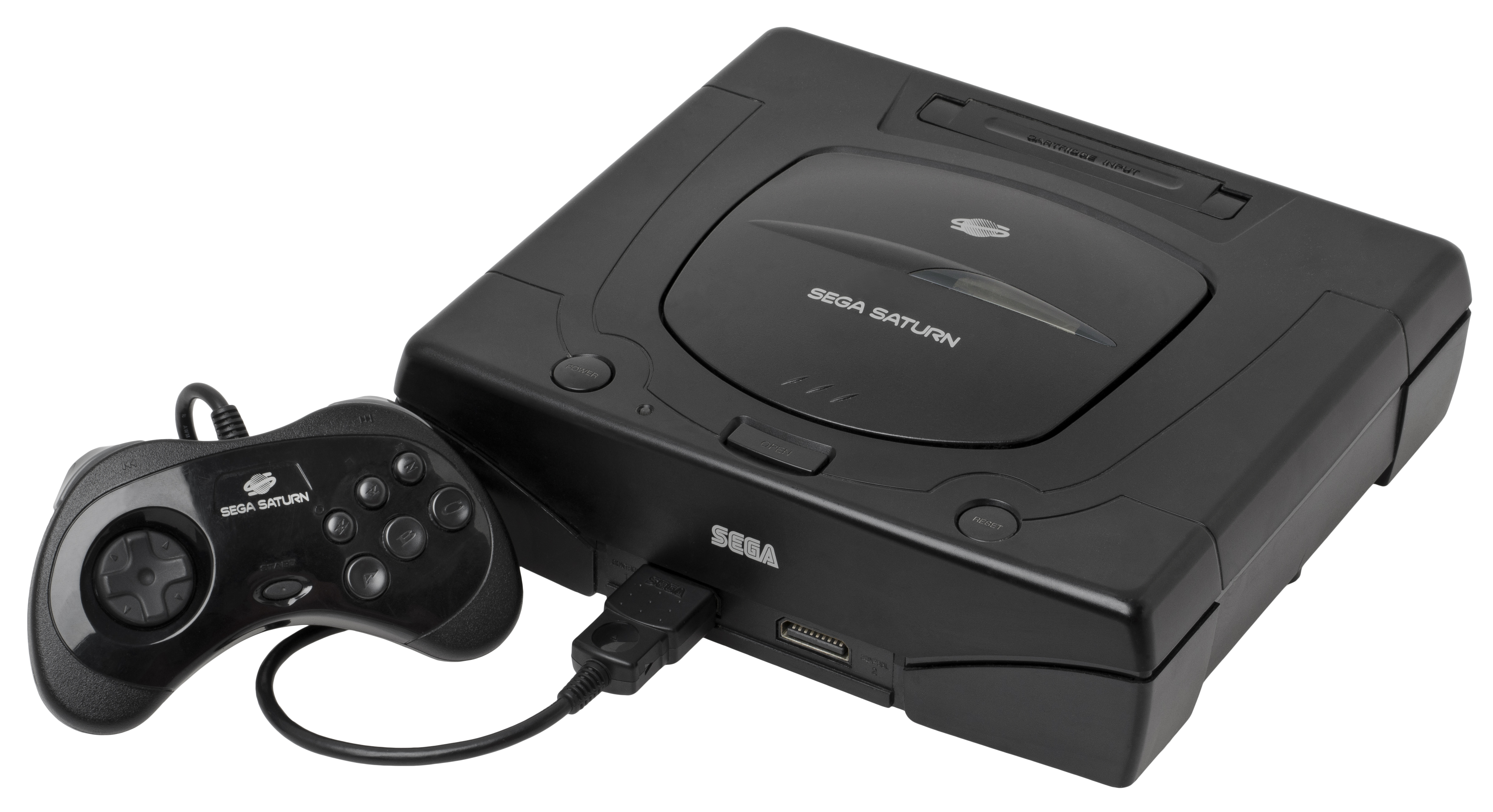
Panzer Dragoon Saga was one of the last games Sega released for the Saturn.

In March 1995, following completion of the original Panzer Dragoon, the producer, Yoji Ishiji, suggested making an RPG to explore the Panzer Dragoon world, as this had been praised in reviews. Sega's president instructed the team to create an RPG to outsell Final Fantasy VII and help the Saturn compete with the PlayStation. Sega's Team Andromeda studio split into two teams: one worked on Saga while the other developed a shooter sequel, Panzer Dragoon II Zwei. Saga had a staff of about 40, twice that of Zwei. Both teams used the Zwei engine and the 3D modeling software Softimage.

The director, Yukio Futatsugi, said Saga was the most difficult Panzer Dragoon game to develop, as many of its features, such as fully 3D environments, were unusual for RPGs at the time. He said that every element was made "from whole cloth". The engine had to support free exploration, battle sequences and real-time morphing and shading, pushing the Saturn to its limits. Futatsugi said it would have been impossible to develop on the PlayStation, as he felt Saturn's "cloudier" palette gives the Panzer Dragoon series its atmosphere. The team used no graphics libraries and programmed everything from scratch.

=== Battle design ===
Akihiko Mukaiyama, who had worked on RPG series including Sakura Wars, was brought in to design the battle system, replacing the Zwei producer Tomohiro Kondo. Mukaiyama expected his job to be simple, but found problems with Kondo's prototype: there was no strategic element, as the player had no reason to change positions. Some staff felt they should create a traditional RPG battle system in which players select commands from a menu, while others wanted to focus on shooting, similar to earlier Panzer Dragoon games. Mukaiyama compromised, allowing players to select commands from a menu or trigger them with buttons.

The battle system went through several iterations as the team struggled to combine the shooter and RPG genres. The positioning system developed from an initial concept of fighting enemies for space; this system was initially free-roaming, but too slow. Mukaiyama simplified it by having the player move between quadrants around the enemy, which better simulated flying and allowed the artists to create dramatic camera movements. The gauge system added further strategic options.

The dragon's morphing ability was added to compensate for the lack of a large cast of playable characters with different skills common in other JRPGs. The team estimated that having the dragon morph in real time would be too difficult to implement, but a programmer surprised them with a working prototype.

Reworking the series' shooting gameplay into an RPG took about a year. Once the team had settled on the core action of locking on to targets, such as enemies and NPCs, the rest of the design followed. After the battle system was finalized, development proceeded smoothly and some staff were moved to help complete Zwei.

=== Story ===
Rather than create a "save-the-world" story with a large cast, Futatsugi concentrated on a small cast he hoped the player would become close to, which he felt would make the story meaningful. Although Edge is not a silent protagonist, Futatsugi minimized his dialogue outside cutscenes to focus on Azel's story, who he felt was the most important character. Early versions had Edge as an imperial soldier who defects, and Craymen had an extensive backstory explaining his motivations for betraying the Empire. Both were cut for time. The team wanted to keep some elements open to interpretation and "leave space for players' imaginations". In Kusunoki's interpretation, Edge dies at the beginning of the story when he is shot, is revived temporarily by the player, and dies again when the game ends.

Panzer Dragoon Saga features full voice acting; by contrast, the Final Fantasy series did not feature voice acting until Final Fantasy X, released three years later. Edge was played by Akira Ishida, Azel by Maaya Sakamoto, Craymen by Masatō Ibu, Paet by Hiroaki Hirata, the Emperor by Chikao Ohtsuka, Arwen by Chikao's son Akio Otsuka, Zastava by Tōru Ōkawa, and Gash by Hōchū Ōtsuka. Sega estimated that the script amounted to more than 1,500 pages of Japanese text. In the English-language versions, the voice acting was subtitled rather than dubbed. Like the other Panzer Dragoon games, Saga features the fictional language Panzerese, which combines elements of Ancient Greek, Latin and Russian. Panzerese is only used in the introduction and end cutscenes, with the rest of the dialogue in Japanese. Some cutscenes are presented in full motion video (FMV); the rest are rendered in real time.

The localizers were given incomplete translations and little supervision, and so inserted their own story interpretations, embellishing details and creating names for monsters. The localizer Chris Lucich read dark fantasy novels for inspiration, hoping to create a "dark post-apocalyptic feel". The biggest change was in the depiction of the relationship between Edge and Azel. According to Futatsugi, their romance is obvious in Japanese but would have been lost on a western audience as emotions are expressed more directly in English. Lucich felt Panzer Dragoon Saga featured one of the first meaningful love stories in a video game.

=== Art ===
Futatsugi aimed to create an RPG without 2D sprites or the pre-rendered graphics used in Final Fantasy, which he felt created an inconsistent effect. Motion capture, then a new technology, was used for the animations, with the actor riding a "dragon" constructed from beer crates.

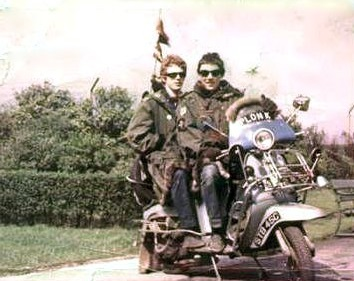
Azel's jacket was inspired by British mod fashion, as seen in this 1960s photograph.

The art director, Manabu Kusunoki, had been the main character and art designer for the previous Panzer Dragoon games. For Saga, he brought in several new artists: Katsumi Yokota created the character and cover art, and Satoshi Sakai and Ryuta Ueda designed the dragons. They resisted creating "spiky-haired" characters similar to those of Final Fantasy VII or Resident Evil, which were popular at the time, and competed to create unique designs. They credited the anime Nausicaä and Neon Genesis Evangelion, the Star Wars films and the comic artist Jean Giraud as influences. The dragon's unconventional design came partly from the need to morph smoothly between different models.

Azel underwent the most revisions. The team did not want a typical energetic anime-style heroine, and instead tried to make her simultaneously appealing and frightening, emphasizing her human and non-human traits. Yokota said: "She couldn't just be cute; there had to be something edgy about her. I struggled with questions like, what does it mean to be cute? What does it mean to be human?" He spent months refining Kusunoki's design, creating dozens of concepts. In one design, Azel had a hole in her chest. Her oversized jacket, belonging to her master, Craymen, was inspired by British mod fashion, which Yokota had seen in the 1979 film Quadrophenia. The team felt the jacket conveyed her identity and allegiance to Craymen and symbolized his protection.

=== Soundtrack ===
The soundtrack was composed by Saori Kobayashi and Mariko Nanba and arranged by Hayato Matsuo. It includes South American, African, Celtic, classical and new age influences. The Verge described it as blend of traditional European and Middle Eastern folk styles with science fiction-like synthesizer sounds.

Instead of prerecorded music, the soundtrack is mostly generated via pulse-code modulation by the Saturn hardware, as with Zwei. The hardware imposed limitations on the compositions, such as reducing the number of possible loops, which Kobayashi felt helped convey the desolate setting. The orchestrated ending theme, "Sona Mi Areru Ec Sancitu", features lyrics in Panzerese. Futatsugi gave Kobayashi tribal music as inspiration, and instructed her not to give it a sense of closure, "leaving things open-ended and with the player wondering what happened".

A soundtrack album was released by Marvelous Entertainment in February 1998. In January 2018, an anniversary edition, Resurrection: Panzer Dragoon Saga, was released by Brave Wave Productions on CD, vinyl and download formats. It features rearranged and rerecorded versions of the original soundtrack. As the original sequencer data no longer exists, Kobayashi recreated the music.

=== Team ===
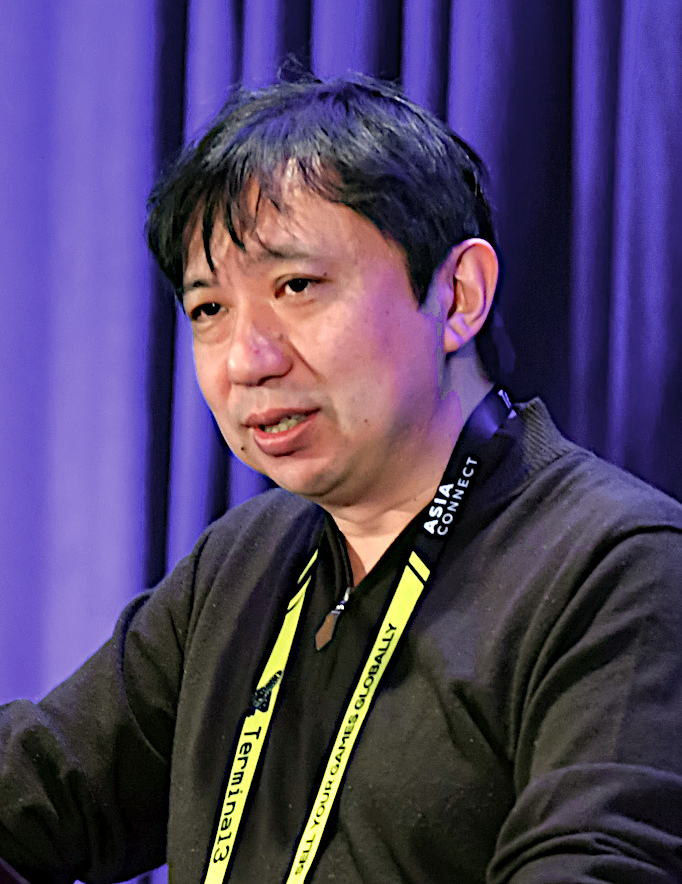
The director, Yukio Futatsugi

In comparison to the small, cohesive teams that had created Panzer Dragoon and Zwei, the Saga team was large and many staff did not know each other. Yokota described the team as "avant-garde and anti-establishment". Kusunoki recalled "endless" disputes, particularly between experienced Panzer Dragoon developers and newcomers who wanted to explore new ideas. The project was delayed several times, creating the impression that it was struggling, and went through several directors.

Mukaiyama found that whereas game development is usually driven by designers, the programmers and artists had their own opinions. The programmers wanted to build on the technically sophisticated shooting of Zwei, whereas the artists wanted to explore the potential of 3D to showcase their characters. He said: "Their visions for the game would collide ... It was a constant battle ... I didn't think there could possibly be a solution to satisfy both parties. It took about a year, and a lot of mistakes, to find a solution."

The development strained the staff. The Ringer characterized Saga as "a game about a world in ruins, produced by a disintegrating development team haunted by heartbreak at a company in decline". Sega lacked experience managing large teams; it was the largest team Futatsugi had managed, and he recalled pressure to "domineer" over the staff. Sega's expectations were high and the team faced intense pressure. At the height of production, staff slept in the office or caught early-morning trains home to nap, and relieved stress by playing fighting games on a Neo Geo arcade cabinet.

Two staff members died during development: one from a motorcycle accident, which Futatsugi attributed to stress, and another from suicide. Futatsugi said it was the most difficult project he had ever worked on, and that "all we could do was carry on and finish the game – it was out of my hands". He was close to the staff member who died from suicide, and was affected by the loss for a long time. Mukaiyama became depressed, and said the project was the hardest experience of his life. Nonetheless, Futatsugi felt it had benefited from having "someone who plays the bad guy role, someone who acts a little selfish, acts a little forceful to the team to achieve specific goals ... Having team members that will support that kind of bad cop is necessary, and if they don't exist then you can't get those kind of results."

== Release ==
Panzer Dragoon Saga was released in Japan in January 1998 as Azel: Panzer Dragoon RPG. European and North American releases followed on 17 April and 5 May, making Saga one of the last Saturn games published by Sega outside Japan. It spans four CDs. In the UK, the first disc was released as a demo with Sega Saturn Magazine; in 2010, GamesRadar+ named it one of the greatest demos of all time.

Sega planned for Panzer Dragoon Saga to compete with the PlayStation RPG Final Fantasy VII, believing that having the best RPG would win the console war, and aimed to sell 1.5 million copies. It was planned for release in the same year as Final Fantasy, but was delayed to 1998 to avoid competing with Grandia, another Saturn RPG. Final Fantasy VII sold almost 10 million copies, but sales of Panzer Dragoon Saga worldwide were low.

In the west, where the Saturn had failed, Sega shifted focus to its next console, the Dreamcast, and retailers were reluctant to stock Saturn games. One of the Saga localizers, Chris Lucich, said it was a "strange transitional period" for Sega of America, which had shrunk from more than 2,000 employees to 200. Sega initially produced only 20,000 North American copies of Panzer Dragoon Saga. After these sold out in two days, a few thousand more were produced. In Europe, only around 1,000 copies were made. The Sega Europe employee David Nulty, who received a production credit, advocated for the release in Europe, saying it was "one of the most epic-feeling games the Saturn ever had".

As Panzer Dragoon Saga received almost no marketing in the west beyond limited print advertisements, the localizers sent screenshots to bloggers, hoping to generate word-of-mouth interest. Sega allotted around only ten copies to the press and focused on hardcore game media, feeling other outlets would not be interested. As no mainstream outlets had Saturn consoles, Sega had to provide them and then retrieve them to give to other outlets. IGN's Levi Buchanan characterized the release as an example of the Saturn's "ignominious send-off" in the west, writing: "Sunset Saturn games like Panzer Dragoon Saga and Burning Rangers demanded far better launches. The way these games were slipped into retail with zero fanfare and low circulation was insulting to both hardworking developers and Sega fans."

Mukaiyama said Sega was confused by the low sales. At the request of the producer Yu Suzuki, who was developing the Dreamcast RPG Shenmue (1999), Sega held a meeting with the developers to discuss the failure. Yokota attributed the low sales to the creative spirit of the team, who were not interested in creating a mainstream product. The localizer Matt Underwood speculated that the post-apocalyptic setting, the "polar opposite" of Final Fantasy, had been off-putting to players.

== Reception ==
Aggregate score
Aggregator	Score
GameRankings	92% (7 reviews)

Review scores
Publication	Score
Computer and Video Games	5/5
Edge	9/10
Electronic Gaming Monthly	9.5, 9.5, 9.5, 10/10
Game Informer	9/10
GameRevolution	A
GameSpot	9.2/10
Next Generation	4/5
RPGFan	94%
Sega Saturn Magazine (UK)	96%
Sega Saturn Magazine (JP)	27/30
Sega Saturn Fan	7.3/10

At the review aggregator website GameRankings, Panzer Dragoon Saga had a score of 92%, the highest of any Saturn game. In 2007, Game Informer wrote that it was considered one of the year's best games and the best Saturn game.

The battle system received particular praise. Electronic Gaming Monthly wrote that whereas other RPGs had players methodically selecting menu options, Panzer Dragoon Saga's system forced them to account for time expenditures and positioning, producing "much more exciting" battles. Next Generation said this built upon the Active Time Battle system of Final Fantasy and more closely simulated tactical combat by having reaction times and firing arcs play a role. GameSpot described the system as a "revelation", with more strategy and challenge than traditional turn-based systems, and menus that become more intuitive with each encounter. Edge praised the range and design of enemies as "consistently superb", and Sega Saturn Magazine praised the depth and quantity of boss encounters.

The graphics were acclaimed. Though GameSpot noted occasional slowdown and "rough" textures, it felt the use of techniques such as gouraud shading, transparency and light sourcing created a "graphic level of excellence on a par with anything available on a home console". The review praised the "fluid easy grace" of the art direction, and the environment design, whose "every exotic location retains a place in your memory". GamePro wrote: "Everything has that Saturn pixelated-edge look, but the scale of the beasts and environments is impressive and often overwhelming." Computer and Video Games and Sega Saturn Magazine found the visual effects matched other home consoles. Next Generation described "some of the most beautiful locations ever seen in an RPG ... It's almost unbelievable that they could come from Saturn." Edge praised the extensive FMV cutscenes, whose "cinematic quality ... shames the work of almost every other developer" and created an "RPG of true creative integrity".

GameSpot likened the sound and music to the quality of Hollywood productions. Though Edge identified the subtitles as a cost-saving measure, it found this "infinitely preferable to the alternative of B-list actors reciting words they have little feeling for" and felt it kept the story lucid and articulate. Electronic Gaming Monthly felt the lack of English voices enhanced the sense of a different world. GamePro felt it insulted US audiences and made the game feel unfinished, but wrote that it was "an aural delight otherwise".

Several critics considered Panzer Dragoon Saga superior to Final Fantasy VII. Next Generation described it as "a game so mature beyond the current scene that other developers have barely begun to explore its conventions". Computer and Video Games wrote that if it were released on PlayStation it would "fly off the shelves". Edge wrote: "It's a tragedy that the Saturn's standing will ensure Team Andromeda's adventure, with a radically different approach to FFVII, will enjoy a fraction of its rival's success." GameSpot concluded: "Saga, in its own way, is so much more than Square's ultimate RPG. It is a worthy successor to a series that with each installment has grown in stature and scope. It is flawlessly executed, limited only by the hardware (and barely that at all) and medium."

Criticism focused on the short length. Sega Saturn Magazine felt Panzer Dragoon Saga was too easy, especially the puzzles, but that achieving "Excellent" ranks in combat provided a good challenge. Computer and Video Games noted that, like other Panzer Dragoon games, Saga rewarded players for full completion, with "astounding" bonuses.

Many publications praised Panzer Dragoon Saga as one of the best RPGs of the year and one of the best on Saturn. GameSpot concluded that it was possibly the year's best RPG, and Game Informer called it "easily" the best Saturn RPG. The Electronic Gaming Monthly reviewers unanimously commended it as one of the best RPGs of all time and awarded it a "Editor's Choice Gold Award". Sega Saturn Magazine described it as "a monumental effort, a work of art, and quite clearly a labour of love", and the best Saturn adventure released in the UK. GamePro said it solidified Panzer Dragoon as the Saturn's "coolest franchise" and was a satisfying completion of the series. At the 2nd Annual Interactive Achievement Awards, Panzer Dragoon Saga was nominated for "Console Role-Playing Game of the Year" and "Console Game of the Year".

=== Retrospective ===
In 2007, Game Informer called Panzer Dragoon Saga one of the greatest games and praised the use of dramatic camera angles and animations to make the battles cinematic "even by modern standards". In a 2007 retrospective, 1UP rated it 9/10, describing it as "the greatest RPG you've never played" and one of the most unique RPGs, and praised the leap from shooter to RPG. Reviewing it in 2008, Retro Gamer praised the fusion of action and RPG elements, and wrote: "If you can find and afford it, you won't be disappointed with this seminal title."

In the 2013 book 1001 Video Games You Must Play Before You Die, Jason Brookes wrote that only the cutscenes had aged poorly and that many aspects remained more impressive than modern RPGs. Brookes, 1UP and Retro Gamer praised the story's restraint and lack of cliché. John Szczepaniak, the author of The Untold History of Japanese Game Developers, said in 2018 that no game story had impressed him more and that the primitive graphics assisted the sense of an ancient, alien world. In a 2018 article for The Ringer, Ben Lindburgh praised the complexity of the characters, saying none were "truly heroic". He felt the story had not dated, despite industry advances.

In a 2008 article for Gamasutra, Kurt Kalata found that while the visual design was "still lovely", the graphics showed the Saturn's 3D limitations, with low-resolution textures, "boxy" character models, frequent slowdown and compressed video. He wrote that the FMV cutscenes, while well directed, were inferior to Final Fantasy and illustrated the Saturn's shortcomings compared to PlayStation. He also agreed that the game was too short and lacked difficulty. Nonetheless, Kalata concluded that Panzer Dragoon Saga was "still thoroughly entrancing" and that its battle system made it "completely worth it".

Panzer Dragoon Saga was named one of the best games of all time by Computer and Video Games in 2000, Electronic Gaming Monthly in 2001 and 2006, IGN readers in 2005, IGN in 2007 and G4 in 2012. In 2005, 1UP named it the number-one cult classic game and in 2006 Game Informer ranked it the most essential rare RPG. In 2008, IGN named it the greatest Saturn game and wrote: "Panzer Dragoon Saga was the swan song to end all swan songs ... This dark, solemn game [is] wholly unique. It is the gem of the generation." In its 2009 list of games with the greatest gameplay, IGN named Panzer Dragoon Saga the "best game no one played". In 2017, Jeff Grubb of VentureBeat said it was arguably the best Sega game and expressed hope for a rerelease. In 2023, Cultured Vultures named it the best Saturn game.

== Legacy ==
Sega disbanded Team Andromeda after Panzer Dragoon Saga's completion. Futatsugi left Sega and joined Konami. The art director Kentaro Yoshida also left, saying he and Futatsugi were "not salarymen" and were unsatisfied with the creative opportunities at Sega. Some staff were reassigned to Smilebit, which developed Panzer Dragoon Orta (2002) for the Xbox. Ueda worked on Jet Set Radio (2000), Sakai worked on Phantasy Star Online (2000) and Yokota worked on Rez (2001), all for Dreamcast.

Though few developers have cited Panzer Dragoon Saga as an influence, the Ringer journalist Ben Lindburgh drew parallels to Horizon Zero Dawn (2017) and the games of Fumito Ueda, particularly The Last Guardian (2016). Lindburgh wrote that these "are regarded as distinctive and original games, and Saga got to some of the same territory first". Guerrilla Games researched Panzer Dragoon Saga while developing a flying section for Killzone 3 (2011).

As of 2018, English-language copies of Panzer Dragoon Saga sold for hundreds of US dollars on the used market, with factory-sealed copies selling for more than a thousand. According to The Ringer, "Its scarcity has conferred a cult-classic status that's become part of its appeal ... To play it is to enter an exclusive, clued-in club." Japanese copies are far cheaper, but have no English translation and cannot be played on western Saturn consoles.

Panzer Dragoon Saga has not been rereleased. In 2009, the game-downloading service GameTap said it had non-exclusive rights to distribute it, but, as Saturn emulation is difficult, there was not enough demand to make it a priority. According to Futatsugi, Sega has lost the source code, making porting difficult. The Sega Europe employee David Nulty lamented the lack of a rerelease, as the western market for Japanese RPGs had grown. Given the opportunity to remake Panzer Dragoon Saga, Futatsugi said he would make it less linear, with an open world, branching choices and online communication. In another interview, he said he would consider telling the story from Azel's perspective. Lindburgh wrote that a full remake would be a significantly risky investment.
