= Saori Kobayashi =

Japanese composer

Saori Kobayashi 小林 早織
- Genres: Video game music
- Occupations: Composer; pianist
- Instrument: Piano
- Years active: 1993–present
- Label: Brave Wave Productions

Saori Kobayashi (小林 早織, Kobayashi Saori) is a video game composer and pianist. She composed music for Sega games, and was best known for her work on the Panzer Dragoon series.

== Works ==
Year	Title	Role	Co-worker(s)
1993	Inspector Gadget	Composer	
1993	Deep Duck Trouble Starring Donald Duck	Composer	
1993	Taisen Mahjong HaoPai 2	Sound	Masayuki Nagao, Haruyo Oguro and M.Momo
1994	Torarete Tamaruka!?	Sound	Various others
1994	Coca-Cola Kid	Sound director	
1994	Sonic Triple Trouble	Staff	Various others
1995	Legend of Illusion Starring Mickey Mouse	Sound Project Coordinator	
1995	Sonic Drift 2	Composer	Masayuki Nagao
1995	Sylvan Tale	Composer	Sound director
1995	Blue Seed: The Secret Records of Kushinada	Sound Editing	Tomoko Sasaki, Tomonori Sawada and Yoshiaki Kashima
1995	Kishin Douji Zenki	Sound director	
1996	J.League Pro Soccer Club o Tsukurou!	Music	Junko Shiratsu
1996	Victory Goal '96	Sound	Hirofumi Murasaki, Jun Senoue and Miki Obata
1996	NiGHTS into Dreams...	Sound effects	Fumie Kumatani and Tatsuya Kouzaki
1996	Sega Worldwide Soccer '97	Sound	Various others
1998	Panzer Dragoon Saga	Composer	Mariko Nanba
1999	Shadowgate 64: Trials of the Four Towers	Composer	Kennosuke Suemura
2003	Panzer Dragoon Orta	Composer	Yutaka Minobe
2007	Hoshigami Remix	Composer	Kennosuke Suemura, Mai Iida, and Ikuko Mimori
2008	Sengoku Efuda Yuugi: Hototogisu Ran	Composer	Kennosuke Suemura
2009	Sakura Note: Ima ni Tsunagaru Mirai	Arranger	
2012	Super Monkey Ball: Banana Splitz	Composer	Yoshitaka Hirota
2013	Crimson Dragon	Composer	Jeremy Garren
2020	Panzer Dragoon: Remake	Composer	Yoshitaka Azuma
