= Rail shooter =

Video game genre

A rail shooter, or on-rails shooter, is a subgenre of the shoot 'em up video game genre. Defined by arcade video games such as Space Harrier (1985), the gameplay locks the player character into a set path, only allowing for limited or no divergence from it, in a manner similar to a theme park dark ride, which is typically on train tracks. While moving on this path, players must aim and shoot enemies while dodging projectiles and avoiding damage.

Many rail shooters feature a flying protagonist or ship. Some take place while walking, running or driving. While rail shooters saw a resurgence on the Wii due to its Wii Remote control scheme, new games in the genre are considered a rarity in the modern day, although many games of other genres contain rail shooter segments.

== History ==
=== 1980s: Origins ===
The rail shooter genre stemmed from arcade video games in the 1980s. The on‑rails formula appeared in 2D arcade side-scrolling shooters with forced scrolling, notably Konami's side-scroller Scramble and SNK's Vanguard in 1981. The following year, Sega released a pseudo‑3D third-person rail shooter in arcades, Buck Rogers: Planet of Zoom (1982). It was followed by pseudo-3D arcade rail shooters such as Atari's first-person vector game Star Wars (1983) and the full-motion video (FMV) laserdisc games Astron Belt (1983) by Sega and Firefox (1984) by Atari.

It was in the mid-1980s that the rail shooter genre would be largely defined by Sega's seminal pseudo‑3D Super Scaler arcade titles, notably Space Harrier (1985) and After Burner (1987). The earliest first-person light gun rail shooter was Sega's Gangster Town (1987), which departed from earlier light gun shooting gallery games by moving the player on-rails through a set path, with the car chase level having a pseudo-3D forward-scrolling perspective. On-rail light gun shooters were popularized by Taito's arcade hits Operation Wolf (1987) and Operation Thunderbolt (1988), which was followed by pseudo-3D arcade titles such as Sega's Line of Fire and SNK's Mechanized Attack and Beast Busters in 1989.

=== 1990s: Peak success ===
In the early 1990s, Midway's Terminator 2: Judgment Day (1991) and Konami's Lethal Enforcers (1992) were light gun rail shooters featuring digitized sprite graphics. At the same time, FMV rail shooters had a resurgence with American Laser Games arcade titles such as Mad Dog McCree (1990), Who Shot Johnny Rock (1991) and Space Pirates (1992) as well as Sega CD console games such as Sewer Shark (1992) and Cadillacs and Dinosaurs: The Second Cataclysm (1994).

Rail shooters transitioned to 3D polygon graphics in the early 1990s with the Namco System 21 arcade games Galaxian 3 (1990), Star Blade (1991) and Solvalou (1991) followed by the Super Nintendo Entertainment System console game Star Fox (1993). First‑person light gun rail shooters transitioned to 3D polygon graphics in the mid-1990s, with arcade hits such as Sega's Virtua Cop (1994) and The House of the Dead (1996) as well as Namco's Time Crisis (1995). Panzer Dragoon (1995) and Panzer Dragoon II Zwei (1996) were two well‑regarded third‑person rail shooters released on the Sega Saturn console around this time.

Star Fox 64 was released in 1997 and gained wide renown for its graphics, level design and non-linearity. It was the last primarily rail shooter Star Fox game, with Nintendo switching to a fully 3D range of movement going forwards. Bucking the trend of combat-oriented games, Pokémon Snap (1999) was one of the first nonviolent rail shooters, and popularized the photography game genre.

Starting in the late 1990s, the genre started to become unpopular, with on-rails gameplay becoming a "dark mark" due to a stigma of being overly shallow. In the late 1990s, first-person shooter (FPS) games became increasingly popular while rail shooters declined in popularity, as FPS games were generally able to offer more variety, depth and sophistication than rail shooters.

=== 2000s: Decline and resurgence ===
While games such as Rez (2001) and Panzer Dragoon Orta (2002) were still released during this time, the lull lasted until the advent of motion control on home consoles with the Wii, leading to a "rebirth" of the genre with major third-party releases in order to capitalize on the light gun-style gameplay.

These included The House of the Dead: Overkill (2009), a grindhouse-style prequel to the original, and Dead Space: Extraction (2009), a spin-off of the survival horror Dead Space franchise. The developers, facing controversy over its differences from the Xbox 360 and PS3 versions, used the term "guided experience" to describe its gameplay. Resident Evil: The Darkside Chronicles (2009) featured shakycam movement. Sin & Punishment: Star Successor (2009) was praised for its impressive graphics.

=== 2010s to 2020s: Niche appeal ===
The Kinect saw its own games, such as Child of Eden (2011), although other developers avoided making their games rail shooters, fearing negative reception. The rail shooter Kid Icarus: Uprising (2012) released to critical acclaim.

Following this motion control "boom", the genre dried up yet again, with releases like Crimson Dragon (2013) and Rambo: The Video Game (2014) being sporadic and low-quality. While many modern games limit the player to linear levels, they still allow for free movement within those levels.

In the modern day, the genre has become largely relegated to indie games, such as Ex-Zodiac, a retro-styled game heavily inspired by the Star Fox series. The AAA title Star Fox (2026) received positive reviews and sold over 1 million copies.

== See also ==
- First-person shooter
- Third-person shooter
