= Sega Sports R&D =

Former division of Sega

Sega Sports Design R&D Dept.
- Native name: セガスポーツ研究開発
- Romanized name: Segasupōtsu kenkyū kaihatsu
- Formerly: Sega R&D2; Sega CS1; Sega CS; Sega Software R&D Dept #6; Smilebit Corporation
- Company type: Division
- Industry: Video games
- Founder: Shun Arai
- Defunct: 2008
- Fate: Merged with Sega Research and Development
- Headquarters: Japan
- Key people: Shun Arai; Takayuki Kawagoe
- Parent: Sega

Sega Sports Research and Development (セガスポーツの研究開発, Segasupōtsu no kenkyū kaihatsu), or Sega Sports R&D, was a development division of the Japanese video game company Sega. It was previously known as Smilebit, one of nine semi-autonomous Sega studios established in 2000. Smilebit was previously known as R&D6 or AM6, which itself was mainly based on Sega PC. Smilebit was known for its sports simulation games, as well as Jet Set Radio. When Sega began developing games for other platforms, Smilebit developed Jet Set Radio Future, Panzer Dragoon Orta and GunValkyrie for Xbox. Smilebit was led by Shun Arai as president and Takayuki Kawagoe as director. Kawagoe became president of Smilebit in 2003.

During a re-organization, Sega's nine studios were consolidated into "four of five core operations", and the non-sports staff of Smilebit was merged into Amusement Vision. Smilebit became exclusively dedicated to sports titles, with the Virtua Striker series from Amusement Vision becoming attributed to Smilebit. When Sega and Sammy were merged into Sega Sammy Holdings, all of the studios merged back into Sega. Smilebit became Sega Sports R&D and developed more sport simulation games, as well as the first entry of the Mario & Sonic at the Olympic Games series. Later, these games were later given to CS1 and CS2 designations, and Sega Sports R&D ceased to exist.

== History ==
When Shun Arai joined Sega, he desired to develop a few online projects as Sega diversified into business ventures such as home banking. Arai was in charge of the Sega Saturn development tools and technical support. Based on this, Sega asked Arai to develop an online game when Smilebit was founded. That title was Hundred Swords which was developed for the Dreamcast. Smilebit as a name was chosen to bring happiness to its users and the digital term 'bit' gives it a more serious image.

Smilebit logo

Smilebit had about 105 employees and six lines of development, with a third of the staff coming from Sega PC. Other staff also joined from another Sega studio, Team Andromeda, which developed the Panzer Dragoon games for Saturn and disbanded after the third game, Panzer Dragoon Saga (1998).

Smilebit was known as the premier studio for sports games. It developed the successful sports simulator series Derby Tsuku, Pro Yakyuu Team o Tsukurou! and Pro Soccer Club o Tsukurou!. Non-sports titles were developed as well. Jet Set Radio was developed by former developers of Panzer Dragoon Saga, who hoped to develop something completely new and unlike the Panzer Dragoon series. A sequel was developed for Xbox, called Jet Set Radio Future, or JSRF. The team got many commendations when they went overseas to events such E3; however, they realized that this did not necessarily mean more sales. Panzer Dragoon was also revived with Panzer Dragoon Orta, which unlike the previous game, Panzer Dragoon Saga, became a regular rail shooter once again. The team hoped that by the time Orta was released, the Xbox market would mature and be more successful than the previous two Xbox titles, JSRF and Gunvalkyrie; however, sales in the US were dissatisfying. Toshihiro Nagoshi, who later lead several team members of Smilebit, commented on the studio, stating that while they did not have high sales, their technical capabilities were very high.

Smilebit was also interested in arcade development. The Typing of the Dead was initially presented to AM1, and Ollie King was originally developed under the Smilebit banner before it was released under Amusement Vision.

In 2003, Sega restructured its development studios and Amusement Vision and Smilebit merged, with the surviving Smilebit becoming solely focused on sports, adding the Virtua Striker games. At the same time Shun Arai left Smilebit to lead the Sega Creative Center. Takayuki Kawagoe took his place instead.

Sega and Sammy merged in 2004 to form Sega Sammy Holdings and all the studios merged back into Sega. Smilebit was named Sega Sports R&D, and continued to develop more sports games, including the first Mario & Sonic at the Olympic Games. Takayuki Kawagoe continued to oversee sports games but eventually oversaw the whole output of Sega of Japan as creative officer and then senior executive officer. The Mario & Sonic games and sports simulator series of games became assigned to the CS1 and CS2 designations, and a dedicated sports division ceased to exist.

== See also ==
- Sega development studios
- Sega AM1
- Sega AM2
- Sega AM3
- Amusement Vision
- Sonic Team
- United Game Artists
