= List of NYU Tisch School of the Arts people =

The following notable individuals have attended and/or graduated from New York University's Tisch School of the Arts.

== List ==
Academy Award winners				Ref
Mahershala Ali	Actor	M.F.A., 2000	Academy Award (2017), Moonlight (2019); Green Book	
Woody Allen	Actor, writer, director	TSOA (Note: Did not graduate.)	Academy Award (1978), Annie Hall (1986); Hannah and her Sisters (2012); Midnight in Paris	
Sean Baker	Director, producer, screenwriter, editor	B.F.A., 1998	Academy Award (2025), Palme d'Or winner (2024), Anora (2024), The Florida Project (2017), Tangerine (2015)	
James L. Brooks	Producer	Coursework	Academy Award (1984), Terms of Endearment	
John Canemaker	Director	M.F.A., 1976	Academy Award (2006), The Moon and the Son: An Imagined Conversation	
Joel Coen	Director, producer, screenwriter, editor	B.F.A., 1978	Academy Award (1997), Fargo (2007); No Country For Old Men	
Ejae	Singer, songwriter, record producer	B.F.A. 2014	Academy Award (2026), Golden	
Geoffrey Fletcher	Screenwriter	M.F.A., 1999	Academy Award (2010), Precious	
Lady Gaga	Actress, singer, songwriter, musician, producer	B.F.A.	Academy Award (2019), A Star Is Born	
Whoopi Goldberg	Actress	TSOA	Academy Award (1991), Ghost	
Marcia Gay Harden	Actress	M.F.A., 1981	Academy Award (2001), Pollock	
Anne Hathaway	Actress	Coursework	Academy Award (2013), Les Misérables	
Lora Hirschberg	Sound mixer	B.F.A., 1985	Academy Award (2010), Inception	
Philip Seymour Hoffman	Actor	B.F.A., 1989	Academy Award (2006), Capote	
Angelina Jolie	Actress	TSOA, 1997	Academy Award (2000), Girl, Interrupted	
Charlie Kaufman	Screenwriter, producer, director	TSOA, 1980	Academy Award (2005), Eternal Sunshine of the Spotless Mind	
Ang Lee	Director	M.F.A.	Academy Award (2006), Brokeback Mountain (2013); Life of PI	
Spike Lee	Director	M.F.A.	Academy Award (2019), BlacKkKlansman	
Kenneth Lonergan	Director, writer	B.F.A., 1986	Academy Award (2017), Manchester By the Sea	
Ken Perlin	Professor at TSOA	Ph.D., 1986	Academy Award (1997) for the development of Perlin noise	
Oliver Stone	Director	B.F.A., 1971	Academy Award (1979), Midnight Express (1987); Platoon (1990); Born on the Fourth of July	
Paul Francis Webster	Composer	1928–1930	Academy Award (1953), Secret Love	
Chloé Zhao	Director, filmmaker	Graduate Film Production	Academy Award (2020), Nomadland	
Emmy Award winners				
Jason Ardizzone-West	Production designer	M.F.A., 2012	Emmy Award (2018), Jesus Christ Superstar Live in Concert	
Alec Baldwin	Actor	B.F.A., 1994	Emmy Award (2008), 30 Rock	
Alexis Bledel	Actress	B.F.A.	Emmy Award (2017), The Handmaid's Tale	
Rachel Brosnahan	Actress	B.F.A., 2012	Emmy Award (2018), The Marvelous Mrs. Maisel	
Frankie Celenza	Culinary host	B.F.A., 2009	Emmy Award (2022), Struggle Meals	
David Chase	Head writer, creator	B.F.A.	Emmy Award (1999, 2003, 2004, 2007), The Sopranos	
Billy Crystal	Actor, writer	B.F.A., 1970	Emmy Award (1991, 1992, 1998), Academy Awards	
Vince Gilligan	Head writer, creator	B.F.A., 1989	Emmy Award (2013), Breaking Bad	
Donald Glover	Actor, writer, director, rapper	B.F.A., 2006	Emmy Award (2017), Atlanta	
Felicity Huffman	Actress	B.F.A., 1988	Emmy Award (2005), Desperate Housewives	
David Javerbaum	Head writer	M.F.A., 1995	Emmy Award (2003, 2004, 2005), The Daily Show	
Kristen Johnston	Actress	B.F.A.	Emmy Award (1997, 1999), 3rd Rock From the Sun	
Tony Kushner	Playwright	M.F.A., 1984	Emmy Award (2004), Angels in America	
Damon Lindelof	Head writer, co-creator	B.F.A., 1995	Emmy Award (2005), Lost	
Camryn Manheim	Actress	M.F.A., 1987	Emmy Award (1998), The Practice	
Debra Messing	Actress	M.F.A., 1993	Emmy Award (2003), Will and Grace	
David Milhous	Editor	B.F.A., 1991	Emmy Award (2017), Crime Watch Daily	
Andy Samberg	Actor	B.F.A., 2000	Emmy Award (2007), "D*ck in a Box", Brooklyn Nine-Nine	
Thomas Schnauz	Director, writer, executive producer	B.F.A., 1988	Emmy Award (2013), Breaking Bad	
Jeffrey Wright	Actor	M.F.A.	Emmy Award (2004), Angels in America	
Tony Award winners				
Nina Arianda	Actress	M.F.A.	Tony Award (2012), Venus in Fur	
Rachel Chavkin	Director	B.F.A., 2002	Tony Award (2019), Hadestown	
Billy Crudup	Actor	M.F.A., 1994	Tony Award (2007), The Coast of Utopia	
Nikki M James	Actress, singer	B.F.A	Tony Award (2011) The Book of Mormon	
Steve Kazee	Actor	M.F.A.	Tony Award (2012), Once	
Bradley King	Lighting designer	B.F.A., 2005 M.F.A., 2010	Tony Award (2018) Natasha, Pierre, and the Great Comet of 1812; Tony Award (2019), Hadestown	
Tony Kushner	Playwright	M.F.A., 1984	Tony Award (1994), Angels in America: Perestroika	
Mimi Lien	Set designer	M.F.A., 2003	Tony Award (2017) Natasha, Pierre, and the Great Comet of 1812	
Idina Menzel	Actress, singer, songwriter	B.F.A.	Tony Award (2004), Wicked	
Donna Murphy	Actress, singer	1977–1979	Tony Award (1994), Passion (1996); The King and I	
Clint Ramos	Costume designer	M.F.A., 1997	Tony Award (2016), Eclipsed	
Mel Shapiro	Director, writer	Founding member	Tony Award (1972), Two Gentlemen of Verona	
Neil Simon	Playwright	1944–1945	Tony Award (1965), The Odd Couple (1985); Biloxi Blues (1991); Lost in Yonkers	
Ali Stroker	Actress, singer	B.F.A, 2009	Tony Award (2019), Rodgers & Hammerstein's Oklahoma!	
Brandon Uranowitz	Actor	B.F.A., 2008	Tony Award (2023), Leopoldstadt	
Jeffrey Wright	Actor	M.F.A.	Tony Award (1994), Angels in America: Perestroika	
Other notable alumni				
Manish Acharya	Director, scriptwriter, actor	M.F.A., 2001	Loins of Punjab Presents, Sita Sings the Blues	
Cynthia Addai-Robinson	Actress	B.F.A., 2002	Spartacus, Arrow	
Karim Aïnouz	Director	M.FA., 1992	Invisible Life, Madame Satã	
Alan Aisenberg	Actor, producer	TSOA	Screen Actors Guild Award (2016): Orange Is the New Black	
Raymond Arroyo	Journalist, author	B.F.A.	EWTN news director and anchor	
Jeff Baena	Director, writer, producer	B.F.A., 1999	Joshy (2016), The Little Hours (2017), Horse Girl (2020)	
Annie Baker	Playwright	B.F.A.	Playwright of Pulitzer Prize-winning play The Flick	
Monica Barbaro	Actress		Chicago Justice and Top Gun: Maverick	
Kristen Bell	Actress	B.F.A., 2002	Veronica Mars, The Good Place, Reefer Madness, Forgetting Sarah Marshall, Frozen	
Julie Benko	Actress	B.F.A., 2013; M.F.A., 2021	Funny Girl	
Julie Benz	Actress	B.F.A., 1994	Jawbreaker, Buffy the Vampire Slayer, Angel	
Selma Blair	Actress	Coursework	The Fog, Cruel Intentions, Scream 2, Hellboy, Legally Blonde	
Justin Blanchard	Actor	B.F.A., 2001	Journey's End (Broadway), Law and Order: Special Victims Unit	
Rachel Bloom	Actress, comedian, singer, writer, producer, and songwriter	B.F.A., 2009	Crazy Ex-Girlfriend	
Barry Bostwick	Actor	TSOA, 1968	Rocky Horror Picture Show, Spin City	
Martin Brest	Director	B.F.A., 1973	Beverly Hills Cop, Meet Joe Black, Gigli	
Dean Fleischer Camp	Director, producer, screenwriter and editor	B.F.A.	Marcel the Shell with Shoes On short films and feature film, Fraud, Lilo & Stitch	
Salvador Carrasco	Director	B.F.A., 1991	The Other Conquest	
Susan Cartsonis	Film producer	M.F.A., 1984	What Women Want	
Rita Kogler Carver	Theater & lighting designer	M.F.A., 1989		
JuJu Chan	Hong Kong-American actress, singer, Taekwon-Do (ITF) athlete and Kung Fu actress	M.F.A., 2009	Palace of the Damned, Fist of the Dragon, Crouching Tiger, Hidden Dragon: Sword of Destiny, Savage Dog, Wu Assassins, The Invisible Dragon	
Derek Connolly	Screenwriter		Safety Not Guaranteed, Jurassic World, Monster Trucks, Kong: Skull Island	
Frank Coraci	Director	B.F.A., 1988	The Wedding Singer, The Waterboy, Click	
Bud Cort	Actor, horse trainer	1967–1969	M*A*S*H, Harold and Maude	
Hannah Doran	Playwright	MFA	The Meat Kings! (Inc) of Brooklyn Heights	
Del Water Gap	Singer-songwriter and record producer	B.F.A., 2016		
Julie Delpy	Actress	TSOA Directing Program	Before Sunrise, Homo Faber, Three Colors: White	
Joel Derfner	Composer, author	M.F.A., 1999	Signs of Life, Blood Drive, Swish	
Amanda Detmer	Actress	M.F.A.		
Lisa Edelstein	Actress		House M.D.	
Lindsay Ellis	Youtuber, author	B.A.	Axiom's End	
Kathryn Erbe	Actress	B.F.A., 1989	Oz, Law and Order: Criminal Intent, Grapes of Wrath, The Father	
Sam Esmail	Writer, director, creator	B.F.A., 1998	Mr. Robot	
Audrey Esparza	Actress	TSOA	Blindspot	
Raúl Esparza	Actor	B.F.A.	Tick, Tick... BOOM!, Taboo, Chitty Chitty Bang Bang, Company	
Nicolas Falacci	Creator, producer, writer	B.F.A., 1981	Numb3rs	
Jack Falahee	Actor	B.F.A., 2011	How to Get Away with Murder	
Wayne Federman	Comedian, actor, writer	B.F.A.	Legally Blonde, 40-Year-Old Virgin, Curb Your Enthusiasm, The X-Files	
Chloe Fineman	Actress, writer, comedian		Saturday Night Live	
FLETCHER	Singer-songwriter	B.F.A., 2016		
Bridget Fonda	Actress	B.F.A., 1986	Doc Hollywood, Jackie Brown	
Marc Forster	Director	1990–1993	Monster's Ball, Finding Neverland, Quantum of Solace	
James Franco	Actor, director, writer	M.F.A., 2011	Spider-Man trilogy, Pineapple Express, 127 Hours	
Melissa Fumero	Actress	B.F.A., 2003	One Life to Live, Brooklyn Nine-Nine	
John Fusco	Screenwriter	B.F.A., 1986	Young Guns, Thunderheart, Hidalgo, Forbidden Kingdom	
Meredith Garretson	Actress	M.F.A., 2017	Resident Alien, The Offer	
Gina Gershon	Actress	B.F.A., 1983	The Insider, Showgirls	
Alexandra Gersten-Vassilaros	Playwright, actress		Co-author of the Pulitzer Prize drama nominee Omnium Gatherum	
Isabel Getty	Singer-songwriter	2016		
Clark Gregg	Actor, director, screenwriter		Avengers	
Jason Grote	Playwright, screenwriter	M.F.A., 2003	Maria/Stuart, "The Crash"	
Matthew Gray Gubler	Actor, film director	B.F.A., 2002	Criminal Minds, Alvin and the Chipmunks, Alvin and the Chipmunks: The Squeakquel, (500) Days of Summer	
Richard W. Haines	Feature film producer, director; film historian	B.F.A., 1979		
Michael C. Hall	Actor	M.F.A., 1996	Six Feet Under, Dexter, The Game	
Wood Harris	Actor	M.F.A., 1983	Above The Rim, The Wire, Empire	
Ethan Hawke	Writer, actor	Coursework	Great Expectations, Snow Falling on Cedars, Training Day	
Leslye Headland	Director	B.F.A., 2002	Bachelorette, Russian Doll, The Acolyte	
Jessica Hecht	Actress	B.F.A., 1987	Breaking Bad	
Amy Heckerling	Director	B.F.A., 1976	Look Who's Talking, Loser, Clueless	
Antony Hegarty	Musician, visual artist	B.F.A., 1992	Swanlights, The Crying Light, UK Mercury Prize 2005, I Am a Bird Now	
Simon Helberg	Actor, comedian, and musician	B.F.A	Big Bang Theory, Florence Foster Jenkins, Annette	
Perez Hilton	Blogger, media personality	B.F.A., 2000		
Todd Holoubek	Actor	B.F.A., 2002		
Winnie Holzman	Playwright, screenwriter, producer	M.F.A., 1984	Wicked (musical), My So-Called Life, thirtysomething, Once and Again	
Robert Horn	Playwright, screenwriter, producer		Tony Award nominee, Tootsie (2019)	
Rubaiyat Hossain	Writer, director, producer	M.F.A., 2016	Under Construction and Made in Bangladesh	
Bryce Dallas Howard	Actress, director	B.F.A., 2003	Jurassic World, The Help, Spider-Man 3	
Shawn Michael Howard	Actor, producer	B.F.A., 1992	Above the Rim, Boycott	
Brianne Howey	Actress	B.F.A., 2011	Ginny & Georgia	
Jenny Jiao Hsia	Video game designer		Beglitched, Fortune-499, Consume Me	
Hu Ge	Chinese actor	TSOA		
Neal Huff	Actor	M.F.A.	Take Me Out, The Little Dog Laughed	
Stephanie Hsu	Actress	M.F.A., 2012	Everything Everywhere All at Once, 2023 Academy Award nominee	
Joe Iconis	Composer, lyricist, librettist	B.M., 2003; M.F.A., 2005	The Black Suits, Be More Chill, Tony Award nominee, Jonathan Larson Award 2006, Kleban Award 2007	
Nicholas Jarecki	Film director, writer, producer, actor, author	B.F.A., 1999	Arbitrage, Crisis, Tyson	
Jim Jarmusch	Director	Coursework	Night on Earth	
Max Jenkins	Actor, writer	B.F.A., 2007	The Mysteries of Laura, High Maintenance	
Tamara Jenkins	Writer, director	M.F.A., 1994	Slums of Beverly Hills, The Savages	
Jeffrey Katzenberg	Producer, co-founder of DreamWorks	Coursework	Shrek	
Ken Kelsch	Cinematographer	M.F.A., 1977	Bad Lieutenant, Big Night, The Funeral	
Daniel Dae Kim	Actor	M.F.A., 1996	Lost, Hawaii Five-0	
Matthew Yang King	Actor, director, producer, writer	B.F.A., 1996	Only Yesterday; Love, Death, and Robots; Numb3rs; Strong Medicine; 24; The World of Steam	
Stanley Kramer	Film producer	B.F.A., 1993	High Noon, Cyrano de Bergerac	
Peter Krause	Actor, director	M.F.A., 1990	Sports Night, Six Feet Under, Parenthood, 9-1-1	
Martin Kunert	Writer, director, producer	B.F.A.	Campfire Tales, MTV Fear, Voices of Iraq	
Eriq La Salle	Actor	B.F.A.	ER	
Fredric LeBow	Screenwriter	M.F.A., 1970	While You Were Sleeping	
Thomas Lennon	Actor, screenwriter	B.F.A., 1992	Reno 911, Night At The Museum	
Bai Ling	Actress, model	1991		
Zoe Lister-Jones	Actress, playwright, screenwriter	B.A.	The Little Dog Laughed	
Katie Lowes	Actress	B.F.A, 2004	Scandal	
Natasha Lyonne	Actress, producer, writer, director	Coursework	But I'm a Cheerleader, Orange is the New Black, Russian Doll, Poker Face	
Chloe Maayan	Actress	M.F.A, 2016	Three Husbands	
Darnell Martin	Director	M.F.A.	Cadillac Records	
Jesse L. Martin	Actor	M.F.A., 1989	Law and Order, RENT	
Mary Stuart Masterson	Actress	Coursework	Dogtown	
mc chris	Musician, writer, comedian	B.F.A.		
Elaine J. McCarthy	Projection designer	B.F.A.	Wicked	
John C. McGinley	Actor	B.F.A.	Scrubs, Platoon, Talk Radio	
John Melendez	Radio call screener and podcast presenter	Attended	The Howard Stern Show, The Tonight Show with Jay Leno, The Stuttering John Dabblecast	
Camila Mendes	Actress	B.F.A., 2016	"Veronica Lodge" on Riverdale	
April Mendez	Professional wrestler, author	Coursework		
Sally Menke	Editor	B.F.A., 1979	Jackie Brown, Kill Bill, Pulp Fiction, Reservoir Dogs	
Honor Molloy	Playwright, novelist, performance artist	B.F.A., 1983	Crackskull Row, Smarty Girl: Dublin Savage, Snapshot	
Karla Mosley	Actress	B.F.A	The Bold and the Beautiful, Beyond the Gates	
Kate Mulgrew	Actress	A.A., 1976	Star Trek: Voyager, Orange Is the New Black	
Andrew Muscato	Producer	B.F.A., 2008	The Greatest Beer Run Ever	
Ruba Nadda	Film director	Six-week film production course	Sabah, Cairo Time, Inescapable, October Gale	
Jules and Gédéon Naudet	Documentary filmmakers	1995	9/11, In God's Name	
Achintya Holte Nilsen	Singer, model, activist, Miss Indonesia 2017 & top 10 Miss World 2017	M.F.A., 2021	Beauty With a Purpose (2017)	
Karen O	Vocalist		Singer for indie rock band Yeah Yeah Yeahs	
Jerry O'Connell	Actor	B.F.A., 1995	Crossing Jordan, Mission to Mars	
Rebecca Odes	Author	M.F.A.	Co-founder of Gurl.com	
Elizabeth Olsen	Actress, producer	B.F.A., 2013	Emmy nomination for Best Actress (2021), Martha Marcy May Marlene, Wind River, Sorry For Your Loss, The Avengers franchise	
Haley Joel Osment	Actor	B.F.A., 2011	The Sixth Sense, Pay It Forward, A.I., Forrest Gump	
Genevieve Padalecki	Actress, blogger	B.F.A.	Supernatural, Walker (2021), Wildfire	
Dean Parisot	Director	B.F.A., 1979	Fun with Dick and Jane, Galaxy Quest	
Nicole Ari Parker	Actress, model, producer	B.F.A., 1993	Boogie Nights, Remember the Titans, Brown Sugar, Soul Food, Empire, And Just Like That...	
Pedro Pascal	Actor	B.F.A., 1997	Game of Thrones, Narcos, The Mandalorian	
Ethan Peck	Actor	B.F.A.	10 Things I Hate About You, Passport to Paris	
Gerianne Pérez	Actor	B.F.A., 2013	In Transit, Six, Waitress, Operation Mincemeat	
Todd Phillips	Director, screenwriter	B.F.A., 1994	Road Trip, Old School, Starsky & Hutch, The Hangover	
Matt Pizzolo	Director, writer, producer	Coursework	Threat	
Aubrey Plaza	Actress, producer, comedian	B.F.A., 2006	Parks and Recreation, Ingrid Goes West, The White Lotus	
Keith Powell	Actor	B.F.A., 2001	30 Rock	
Matthew Puccini	Director, writer, producer, editor	B.F.A., 2015	The Mess He Made, Lavender, Dirty	
Samantha Quan	Producer, actress	M.F.A., 2001	Anora, The Florida Project, CSI: Miami	
Danny Ramirez	Actor, writer	B.F.A., 2017	Assassination Nation, Top Gun: Maverick, The Gifted	
Brett Ratner	Director	B.F.A., 1991	Rush Hour, Red Dragon	
Ford Riley	Producer, screenwriter, lyricist	B.F.A.	The Lion Guard, Special Agent Oso	
Ernesto Ríos	New media artist and academic	M.F.A.		
Fred Ritchin	Writer		Former New York Times editor	
Gala Rizzatto	Singer		Freed from Desire	
James Roday	Actor	B.F.A.	Psych	
Maggie Rogers	Songwriter, producer	B.F.A	Grammy nomination for Best New Artist (2019), Heard It In a Past Life	
Daisy Rosario	Actor, comedian, journalist	B.F.A.	Latino USA, Mic's Future Perfect	
Alberto Rosende	Actor	B.F.A., 2015	Shadowhunters, Chicago Fire	
Adam Sandler	Actor, comedian, producer	B.F.A., 1988	Mr. Deeds, Big Daddy, Funny People	
Taylor Schilling	Actress	2008	Orange is the New Black, The Lucky One, Take Me, The Titan	
Rose Schlossberg	Filmmaker	M.P.S., 2013	Time: The Kalief Browder Story	
Brandon Scott	Actor	B.F.A., 2004	This Is Us, 13 Reasons Why, Dead to Me, Blair Witch	
Stephanie Sengupta	Writer, producer	M.F.A., 1999	Law & Order: Criminal Intent, Reign, Law & Order, The Good Wife	
Rachel Sennott	Actor, writer, producer	B.F.A., 2017	Shiva Baby, Bodies Bodies Bodies, Bottoms	
Molly Shannon	Actress, comedian, author	B.F.A., 1987	Other People, Divorce, I Love That For You	
M. Night Shyamalan	Writer, director	B.F.A., 1992	The Sixth Sense, Unbreakable, Signs, The Village, The Happening	
Maggie Siff	Actress	M.F.A., 2004	Billions, Mad Men, Sons of Anarchy	
Steven Sills	Screenwriter	B.F.A., 1993	Sinner	
Sarah Silverman	Comedian, actress, writer	TSOA, 1988		
Oren Soffer	Cinematographer	B.F.A., 2013	The Creator, Onslaught, Allswell in New York, Fixation, A Nightmare Wakes, Opera of Cruelty	
Todd Solondz	Director	M.F.A.	Welcome to the Dollhouse, Happiness, Palindromes	
Somi	Singer, songwriter, playwright, and actress	M.F.A.	2021 Grammy Award nominee, Holy Room - Live at Alte Oper; NAACP Image Award (2021)	
Morgan Spurlock	Director	B.F.A., 1993	Super Size Me	
Corey Stoll	Actor	M.F.A., 2003	House of Cards, Billions	
Chris Sununu	Politician		82nd governor of New Hampshire	
Miles Teller	Actor	B.F.A., 2009	Whiplash, Divergent series, The Spectacular Now, Top Gun: Maverick	
Maura Tierney	Actress	Coursework	ER, News Radio, Primary Colors	
AP Thomson	Video game designer		Beglitched, Consume Me, Titanium Court	
Colin Trevorrow	Director	B.F.A., 1999	Home Base, Safety Not Guaranteed, Jurassic World, The Book of Henry	
Omi Vaidya	Actor			
Amirah Vann	Actress	M.F.A., 2007	Underground, How to Get Away With Murder	
Simon Verhoeven	Director, writer, actor, composer	B.F.A. 1999	Men in the City, Welcome to Germany, winner, "Peace Prize of German Film" 2017	
Nitya Vidyasagar	Actress	TSOA	Sesame Street	
John Waters	Director	Coursework	Pink Flamingos, Polyester, Hairspray, Serial Mom	
Katherine Waterston	Actress	B.F.A., 2002	Fantastic Beasts and Where to Find Them, Alien: Covenant, Steve Jobs, Inherent Vice	
Jonathan Weisbrod	Film producer and screenwriter	B.F.A., 2015	Lies I Told My Little Sister (2012)	
Julia Whitworth	Episcopal priest	TSOA	Bishop of Massachusetts	
Chandra Wilson	Actress	B.F.A., 1991	Grey's Anatomy	
Mara Wilson	Actress	B.F.A., 2009	Mrs. Doubtfire, Matilda, Miracle on 34th Street	
Rainn Wilson	Actor	M.F.A., 1989	Six Feet Under, The Office	
Todd Wiseman Jr.	Filmmaker	B.F.A., 2009	Co-founder of Hayden5	
Agnieszka Wojtowicz-Vosloo	Director	B.F.A., 2002	Pâté, After.Life	
D. Woods	Musician	B.F.A., 2005	Member of girl group Danity Kane	
Doug Wright	Playwright	TSOA, 1987	Winner, 2004 Pulitzer Prize for Drama	
