= AP Thomson =

American video game designer

- AP Thomson at Independent Games Festival, 2025
- Education: New York University Tisch School of the Arts
- Occupations: Video game designer; director; programmer; composer

Alec Thomson, more well known as AP Thomson, is an American video game designer, director, and composer based in New York. He has collaborated with other notable developers such as Jenny Jiao Hsia and Bennett Foddy. He is also the first and so-far only person to win the Seumas McNally Grand Prize two years in a row for 2025's Consume Me and 2026's Titanium Court.

== Career ==
Thomson was a student at New York University Game Center where he worked alongside fellow students such as Jenny Jiao Hsia, and instructor at the university Bennett Foddy.

Thomson would work alongside Hsia and Foddy for multiple projects both during and after college. With Hsia, their 2016 title Beglitched would win Best Student Game at the Independent Games Festival Awards that year. With Foddy, the two would develop a showcase of various other video games entitled Multibowl using emulation to create a series of fast-paced mini-games that many critics likened to the Warioware series. The title would not receive a standard release and instead only be shown at various public events only, due to copyright concerns.

In 2018, Thomson would release a game alongside Hsia titled Fortune-499 exclusively through Humble Bundle. The two would co-director another title releasing in 2025, Consume Me, which would win the Seumas McNally Grand Prize. Thomson would develop another game by himself titled Titanium Court which would be released the following year in 2026. Titanium Court would also win the Seumas McNally Grand Prize, making Thomson the first person to win the award two consecutive years in a row.

== Ludography ==
Game Credits
| Year | Game | Notes | Ref(s) |
|---|---|---|---|
| 2014 | Stair | With Bennett Foddy | |
| 2014 | Stellar Smooch | With Jenny Jiao Hsia | |
| 2014 | DeepWeb | Made for Ludum Dare 29 | |
| 2016 | Beglitched | With Jenny Jiao Hsia | |
| 2016 | Multibowl | With Bennett Foddy; Unreleased due to copyright concerns | |
| 2016 | Swap Sword | With Diego Garcia | |
| 2018 | Fortune-499 | With Jenny Jiao Hsia | |
| 2025 | Consume Me | With Jenny Jiao Hsia | |
| 2025 | Baby Steps | Playtester | |
| 2026 | Titanium Court | - | |
