= Egging On =

2025 video game

- Developer: Egobounds
- Publishers: Alibi Games Limited; IndieArk
- Engine: Unity
- Platforms: PlayStation 5; Windows; Xbox Series X/S
- Release: November 6, 2025
- Genre: Platformer
- Mode: Single-player

Egging On is a 2025 3D platformer video game developed by Poland-based studio Egobounds and published by Alibi Games Limited and IndieArk. In the game, the player controls a chicken egg that can roll and jump, and must ascend progressively through vertically oriented levels. Egging On received generally positive reviews from critics.

== Gameplay ==
Egging On is a 3D platformer in which the player controls a fragile chicken egg that must ascend from a henhouse through a series of increasingly complex vertical environments. Movement is governed by physics that reflect the egg's uneven shape, requiring careful control and precise timing to execute low or high jumps depending on the point of contact with the ground. The game offers a standard mode built around a continuous climb without checkpoints, alongside an optional checkpoint system that uses drone pads to return the player to previously reached areas. As players progress through zones such as the Hen House, Factory, and Kitchen, they encounter hidden tasks, shortcuts, and a range of collectible shells and special skins that provide different abilities. A narrator—heard only occasionally—accompanies the player during the ascent, as the game layers in environmental interactions and optional challenges.

== Release and reception ==
First revealed during Summer Game Fest 2024, Egging On released its first demo during the event. The second demo was made available as part of the June Steam Next Fest on June 9, 2025. The full game was released on November 6, 2025, for PlayStation 5, Windows and Xbox Series X/S—after missing its originally planned August 7th full-release date. The title was developed by Egobounds and published by Alibi Games Limited and IndieArk. The game was developed using the Unity engine.

Critics offered a generally positive but varied reception to Egging On, with many praising its inventive premise, physics-driven precision platforming, and escalating difficulty. Jon Clarke from XboxEra highlighted its carefully tuned mechanics, distinct zones, and ambitious design, calling it a rewarding and distinctive experience, while Jason Flatt from But Why Tho? emphasized its minimal tutorials, intuitive learning curve, guiding narrator, and retro style that make progress feel intrinsically satisfying. Jord Tury from Gaming.net provided a more mixed view, acknowledging the game's creativity and memorable areas but arguing that its punishing terrain, sparse checkpoints, and rage-game structure make even simple movements frustrating, offering limited reward beyond personal accomplishment. Neil Watton from The Xbox Hub similarly noted the intentionally punishing design—where a single mistake can erase significant progress—though he praised its detailed environments, collectible stamps, and cosmetic shells for adding character. Cassie from Minimap compared the game to titles like Getting Over It and Only Up!, commending its tip-based precision mechanics, hazardous vertical level design, secrets, accessibility options, and specialty eggs, viewing it as a challenging yet approachable entry in the punishing-platformer genre despite minor issues such as repetitive narrator dialogue and unskippable drone returns.

== See also ==
- Chained Together
- Getting Over It with Bennett Foddy
- I Am Bread
- Only Up!
