= Deep Dip =

Series of racing courses in Trackmania

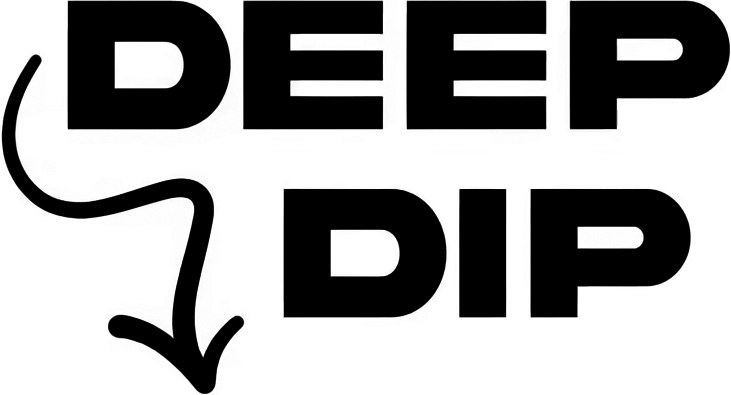
The logo for the series.

Deep Dip is a series of user-generated racing courses for the 2020 video game Trackmania. The courses consist of a tower with a certain number of floors, each made by a different creator. Deep Dip courses are notorious for their difficulty, requiring precision and substantial knowledge of the game's mechanics, bugs and exploits, as well as featuring no checkpoints; a player falling off the track can lose a substantial amount of progress, possibly falling all the way down to the start of the map. The courses' design was inspired by Getting Over It with Bennett Foddy.

== Deep Dip ==
In November 2022, Deep Dip was released, consisting of 14 floors made by various mappers. The map was originally made as a sequel for the level Bennett Foddy ate my CPs, a similar but shorter course. The Deep Dip event was also announced, with a prize pool of $1,000 given to the first three players who beat the map, with an additional $100 given to whoever first goes down the "snake", an obstacle that sends you to the beginning of the course, inspired by a similar object in Getting Over It. After 6 days, Brendan "Bren_TM2" Seve became the first person to finish the map, followed by Øyvind "Wirtual" Iversen and Ixxonn in second and third place respectively.

== Deep Dip II ==
In April 2024, Deep Dip II, a direct sequel to the original map, was announced in a video by Iversen covering the original map. The map released in May 2024, taking 18 months to develop. An event was organized, with a donation-funded prize pool of $30,000 distributed among the first three finishers. An in-game plugin was released, tracking the player's and the competitors' current and highest achieved altitude. With 16 floors, more intricate required tricks and a finish line right above a chasm that leads to the first floor, the map was considerably more difficult than its predecessor. The map was intentionally designed as a "spiral", to ensure harder recovery from falls, as stated by the event's organizer SparklingW, who noted that the mapping team "decided on the spiral shape before [they] even began mapping [their] floors". Seve stated that "an average player would be happy to reach floor four", noting that Trackmania gameplay "looks way easier than what it is... You watch pro players on the world cup, they do a mistake - it almost looks stupid - but it's so precise."

Deep Dip II became notable for not being beaten within one month of the map's existence. At that point, several professional players got stuck at the last floor because of a particular trick. Certain players decided to bow out of the competition altogether, most notably Iversen, who stated that "The map [...] is too difficult" and that continuing trying to beat the map will be "destructive to the rest of [his] life.", while opining that "The difficult floors should be earlier in the map".

After 36 days of the event and 220 hours of playtime, Brendan "Bren_TM2" Seve became the first person to finish Deep Dip II, followed by Filip "eLconn21" Šprungl the same day. After the map was beaten, the map's floors were later released as separate levels for players to practice. An easier version of the map was also released, adding checkpoints, decreasing the overall difficulty and removing obstacles that required knowing obscure gameplay mechanics.

== Deep Slip ==
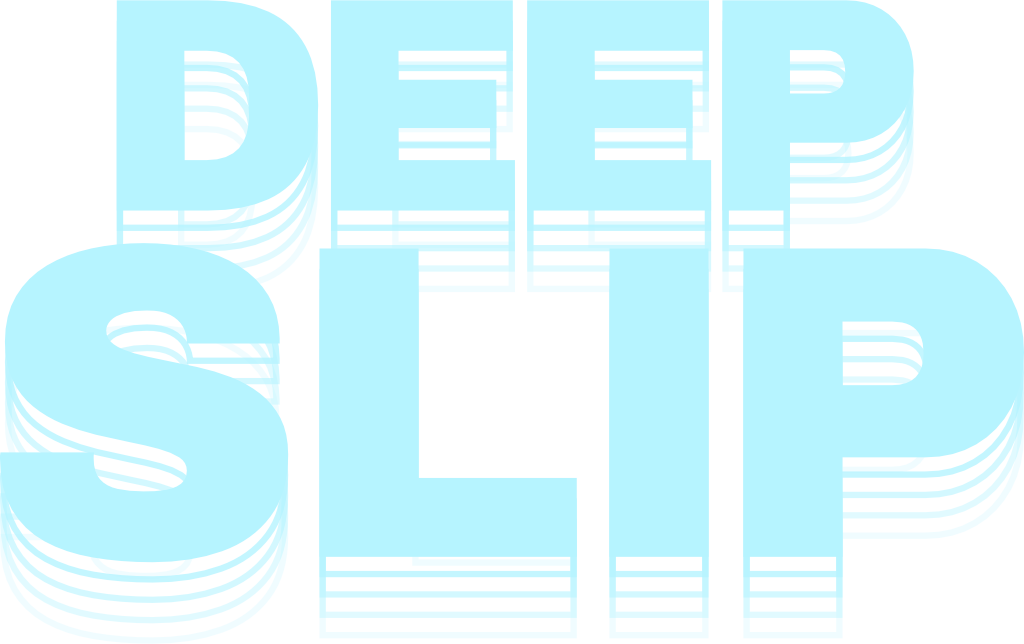
Deep Slip logo

Deep Slip, an ice tower following the same concept on 18 floors, organized and in big parts built by ice player BurlyPog, was released on 4th of July 2025. The event raised a prize pool of roughly $4000. After 12 days, over 92 hours of playtime and 264 falls, Iversen (also known as Wirtual) became the first person to finish Deep Slip, followed by Šprungl the same day and Lars Buchholz two days later.

== Reception and impact ==
Various news outlets noted the courses' difficulty, with Rock Paper Shotgun describing Deep Dip II as "a huge, winding gauntlet made of pieces suspended in midair" and PC Gamer stating that "Every single floor of this thing is a nightmare".

During the two Deep Dip events, Trackmania's viewership on Twitch increased considerably and Trackmania streamers were rapidly gaining subscribers.

SparklingW stated that if Deep Dip 3 were to release, the map's difficulty would be "somewhere between Deep Dip and Deep Dip II, rather than more difficult", noting that "If [Deep Dip II] was any harder, it would have possibly been problematic for the enjoyment of the event."

== See also ==
- A Difficult Game About Climbing
- Jump King
- Only Up!
- Getting Over It with Bennett Foddy
