= Chained Together =

2024 video game

- Developer: Anegar Games
- Publisher: Anegar Games
- Platform: Windows
- Release: June 19, 2024
- Genre: 3D platformer
- Modes: Single-player, multiplayer

Chained Together is a 2024 3D platformer game developed and published by Anegar Games. Connected by a chain, players must cooperate to escape hell. Released on June 19, 2024, the game has garnered a positive reception for its gameplay.

== Gameplay ==
In Chained Together, up to four players are connected by a chain and must reach the top of the map to escape hell. Throughout the game, players can find ten power-ups called Wings that allow them to recover from falling. Players may choose a hard mode, where lava constantly rises, or an easy mode, where there are checkpoints. A single-player mode is available. The game was released on June 19, gaining 80,000 players within its first week of release.

== Reception ==
Cass Marshall of Polygon compared the game to QWOP, Getting Over It, and Only Up!, adding that the multiplayer element built teamwork. GamesRadar's Kaan Serin commented that the chains made the game "stand apart". Brendan Caldwell, Edwin Evans-Thirlwell, and Nic Reuben of Rock Paper Shotgun praised the challenge of keeping a strong team.

=== Awards and nominations ===
Year	Ceremony	Category	Result	Ref.
2024	Golden Joystick Awards	Streamers' Choice Award	Won	
2024	The Streamer Awards	Stream Game of the Year	Won	

== Film adaptation ==
In November 2025, Anton Studios was reported to be developing a film adaptation of the video game, with Cory Todd Hughes and Adrian Speckert writing.

== See also ==
- It Takes Two
