= Multibowl =

Competitive minigame compilation

Multibowl is a competitive minigame compilation of scenes from 1980s and 90s video games. Its creators, Bennett Foddy and AP Thomson, intend to show the work at events and have no plans for a public release due to copyright issues.

== Gameplay ==
Similar to the microgames of WarioWare, Multibowl is a compilation of two-player scenarios culled from 230 commercial games and presented as a minigame competition. The games were first released in the 1980s to mid-90s. Each scenario is presented as a 30-second challenge, and the game awards a point to the first player to complete the objective within the time limit. The first player to ten points wins.

Scenarios include killing the other player in the original Mario Bros. or scoring a goal in Sensible Soccer. Each minigame is introduced with a custom title screen that includes the objective, game's title, and historical metadata (publisher, year).

== Development ==
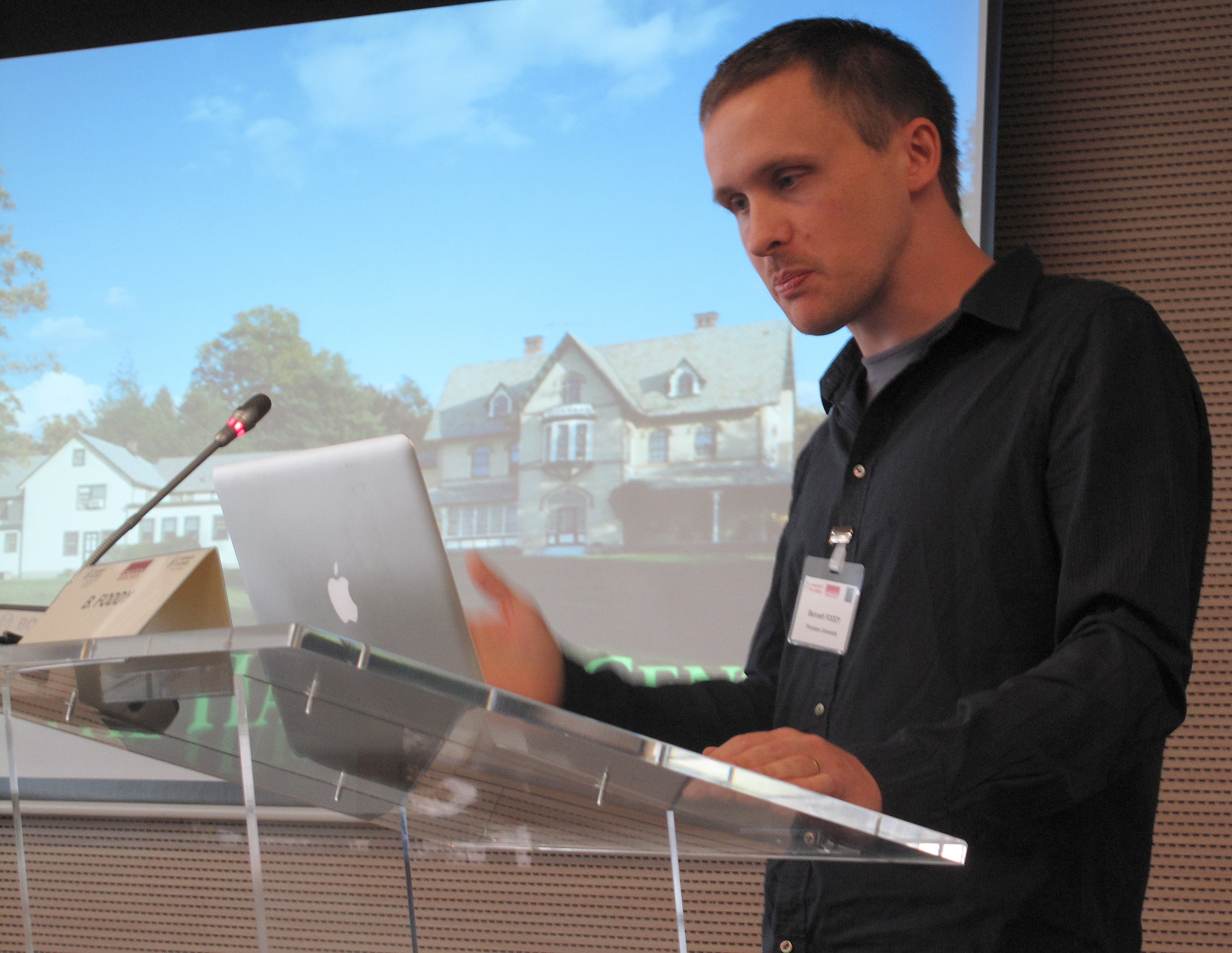
Foddy in 2009

Spurred by his interest in video game history and by the advancement and accessibility of video game emulators—in particular, the combination of MAME and Multi-Emulator Super System—Bennett Foddy sought to curate a selections from a series of video games across multiple platforms with no setup in-between. The indie developer and creator of QWOP noted how the technological advancement of emulators would let players cut right to the highlights of each game rather than dealing with the technical details of emulator setup. He was also concerned with how lesser-known but interesting games are lost from the cultural record by technological inaccessibility. Foddy recruited AP Thomson to help with the compilation's programming and together developed a prototype within three days.

The two then added original, simultaneous two-player games that fit the format. For example, basketball games with gameplay similar to NBA Jam were excluded for originality and games like F-Zero were excluded for lack of concurrent two-player modes. Some titles are included more than once, with different scenes, and some titles deviated in objective from the original title—such as attempting to arrest enemies in Narc rather than killing them. Foddy and Thomson considered how their curation changed the tone of the included games. They appreciated their compilation's element of confusion, where players enter minigames disoriented to the relation between the objective, controls, and on-screen images.

To avoid legal issues, the compilation will not be released to the public. Though the compilation will only play a selection from a title, the full game file must be included with the package by design and loaded into the game's memory. Instead, Foddy and Thomson intend to show the game at events, festivals, museums, streamers, and other limited events. It has been exhibited at XOXO and Fantastic Arcade.

== Reception ==
Eurogamer remarked that the game's format introduces players to retrogaming classics quickly.
