= A Difficult Game About Climbing =

- Developer: Pontypants
- Engine: Unity
- Platforms: Windows, macOS
- Release: March 6, 2024
- Genre: Platform
- Mode: Single-player

A Difficult Game About Climbing is a 2024 indie climbing video game and rage game produced by solo developer Pontypants in the Unity engine and inspired by the gameplay of Getting Over It with Bennett Foddy.

== Gameplay ==
The player reaching from one stable surface to another. The slippery green rocks would cause the player to slide downwards.

Taking inspiration from other rage games like Getting Over It with Bennett Foddy, Only Up!, Pogostuck, and Jump King, the primary objective is climbing through a themed platforming obstacle course to the top of a mountain. What sets A Difficult Game About Climbing apart is its unique movement style, where mouse or joystick input directs force vectors applied to the player character's arms through Unity's physics simulation tools. This behavior is somewhat similar to Getting Over It's hammer or the manual leg controls of QWOP. Restricting movement to the character's two arms and hands limits traversal to what is possible with only two points of contact, but gaps can be crossed by swinging to create momentum.

Bodies of water are used as a checkpoint system when players fall. Each new game area or level is associated with a new body of water, so falls resulting from failing platforming challenges do not return players to the beginning of the game, but the beginning of the area.

== Development ==
Pontypants released a dev log on YouTube on March 6, 2024, discussing the process of building out the physics, gameplay, sound design, and map design of the game. Prototyping began in Godot before migrating to Unity.

== Reception ==
The game performed well on the Steam charts immediately on release. Like with other rage games, A Difficult Game About Climbing became popular during a window on release as a livestreaming and Let's Play title on sites like Twitch and YouTube, with content created by YouTubers such as Markiplier, IShowSpeed, and Northernlion helping to bring interest to the game. It also became a popular game to speedrun.

Steven V. Santos gave a score of 70/100 for Game8.
