= Baby Steps (video game) =

2025 video game

- Developers: Gabe Cuzzillo; Maxi Boch; Bennett Foddy
- Publisher: Devolver Digital
- Platforms: PlayStation 5; Windows
- Release: September 23, 2025
- Genre: Walking simulator
- Mode: Single-player

Baby Steps is a 2025 walking simulator video game developed by Gabe Cuzzillo, Maxi Boch, and Bennett Foddy. Unlike other games of its genre, the act of walking is not automated; the player must raise and lower their character's feet. It was released for PlayStation 5 and Windows on September 23, 2025 to generally positive reviews.

== Gameplay ==
In Baby Steps, players must individually place Nate's leg as he walks forward.

Baby Steps is a walking simulation video game played from a third-person perspective. In the game, the player assumes control of a man named Nate, who must attempt to reach a distant mountain. The player must manually lift and place Nate's legs as he walks, shifting his weight side to side while maintaining balance. The game is set in an open world with numerous optional locations of interest; the map itself has no limits and wraps around horizontally. As players progress, the terrain will become more treacherous, and Nate will be faced with numerous environmental obstacles and hazards that may hinder his progress. Players will need to replay certain sections of the game if they misstep and fall off the track, though the game features occasional checkpoints. It also has no waypoint, fast travel or a map, though glowing campsites guide players to the correct direction. The game features a "fully dynamic onesie soilage system", in which Nate's costume will accumulate mud and dirt as he explores.

== Plot ==
Nate, a 35-year-old socially inept couch potato living in his parents' basement, is sleeping on a sofa when a power surge awakens him. As he touches the television remote control, he teleports to a surreal outdoor world and begins walking.

Nate meets Jim, a mountain guide, who repeatedly offers to provide Nate—barefoot in his onesie, unkempt, and desperate to pee—with a map, shoes and the location of a toilet. Nate continually refuses due to his social anxiety and awkwardness. He also meets hiking enthusiast Mike and a tribe of half-naked anthropomorphic donkeys who tell him about a castle where every walker gets to make one wish. Some of the donkeys are dismissive of his own wishes and hope that he will use his wish to get them cigarettes. Instead, upon reaching the wishing idol he momentarily has an out-of-body experience seeing himself on the couch back in his parents' house, and wishes that he were dead.

The next morning, a sympathetic donkey named Moose tries to cheer Nate up with ice cream and mentions that he is building a log cabin high in the mountains. Nate continues onward toward the mountains and finds a spiral staircase leading up a tall cliff. He can climb the cliff or use the staircase to bypass it, getting a different cutscene in each case.

Nate eventually climbs a snow-covered peak, and below the summit he finds a pit where Moose has built his cabin. Moose answers when he knocks on the door and greets him, but doesn't invite him in. This repeats when Nate knocks again, but the third time Nate gathers the courage to ask if he can come in, and Moose cordially agrees. Inside the cabin Nate finds a toilet for long-awaited relief and a map on which he retraces his journey.

After the credits, Nate naps on a sofa and mulls walking to the summit as Moose prepares dinner.

== Development ==
Baby Steps was developed by Gabe Cuzzillo, Maxi Boch, and Bennett Foddy. Foddy was known for developing difficult games such as QWOP and Getting Over It, and previously collaborated with Cuzzillo and Boch on Ape Out. The initial pitch for the game was suggested by Cuzzillo, who wished to develop a more refined version of QWOP. The scope of the game was expanded significantly, featuring a large, 3D environment while maintaining signature features of Foddy's previous games, such as gameplay mechanic heavily focused on locomotion, ragdoll physics, and major progress loss following an episode of failure. The team was also inspired by the concept of Death Stranding. As with Foddy's past games, the team wanted players to find fun through learning and understanding the gameplay mechanics. Commenting on the game's difficulty, Foddy added that there was a "latent love of punishing choices" among players, while Cuzzillo added that the game presented players with "situations that might prompt introspection", adding that players were the one who actively decide to complete the game's challenges despite not finding them fun.

The main character in the game was described by Foddy as "nerdy and unprepared", though the team decided to "turned that dial up and up", resulting in the creation of Nate, an unemployed, socially inept man-child wearing a onesie. Foddy added that Nate was very insecure. Throughout the game, he actively rejects any help from other non-playable characters to maintain a façade of masculine success. Cuzzillo provided the voice for Nate, while Foddy voiced most other characters and often improvised to put Cuzzillo off his guard. Real-life hiking trails, such as Old Rag Mountain and Angel's Landing, as well as locations from the Uncharted series inspired the game's world.

Baby Steps was announced by publisher Devolver Digital in June 2023. Originally set to be released in 2024, it was delayed to September 8, 2025, and then further delayed for few more weeks to avoid competing with Hollow Knight: Silksong. The game was released on September 23, 2025, for PlayStation 5 and Windows.

== Reception ==
Reception

Aggregate scores
Aggregator	Score
Metacritic	(PC) 77/100 (PS5) 75/100
OpenCritic	73% recommend

Review scores
Publication	Score
Eurogamer	4/5
Game Informer	6/10
GamesRadar+	3.5/5
IGN	9/10
PC Gamer (US)	85/100
Push Square	8/10
Shacknews	7/10

Baby Steps received "generally favorable" reviews, according to review aggregator site Metacritic. Fellow review aggregator OpenCritic assessed that the game received strong approval, being recommended by 73% of critics.

Kyle Orland from Ars Technica wrote that the game can be "punishing, unforgiving, tedious, and enraging" at times. However, he noted that player progression is entirely defined by players' understanding the game's mechanics and controls, and the game created "moments of the most genuinely satisfying sense of achievement I can remember having in modern gaming". He compared Baby Steps to Death Stranding and Foddy's previous games, describing it as a "wonderfully surreal, unique game". Travis Northup from IGN wrote that "despite centering itself around intentionally awkward controls, it has a deceptive level of depth that made me eager to master it". While he noted that the game can be difficult, most of its most frustrating challenges were optional, and he "couldn't really get too mad" at the game because he "voluntarily subjected" himself to completing them. Polygon's Giovanni Colantonio described Baby Steps as 2025's "funniest game", praising its slapstick comedy. He noted that despite the game's wacky premise, it was also a "sincere dissection of manhood and the societal pressures it creates".

Writing for GamesRadar, Luke Kemp felt that Baby Steps was much more accessible than Foddy's previous games, though he noted that certain segments of the game were significantly more infuriating than the overall experience. He added that the game camera did not adequately inform the player of Nate's surroundings. In a more negative review, Charles Harte from Game Informer noted that Baby Steps was a game designed for streamers, as it was funnier watching the game instead of playing it. While he understood the direction the game was going for, he found that the overall experience to be "annoying and grating" and largely unenjoyable.

=== Awards ===
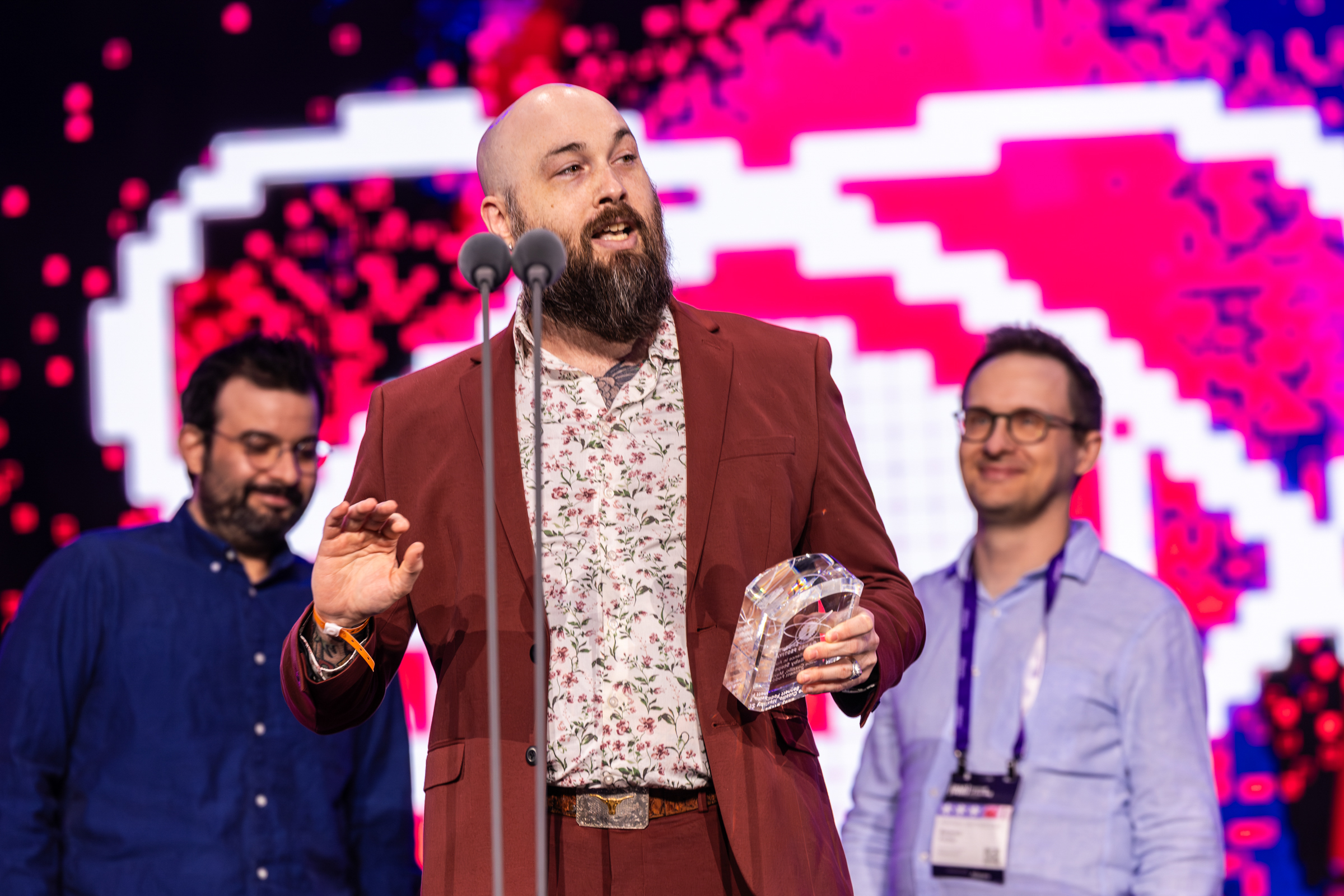
Baby Steps won Excellence in Audio at the 28th Independent Games Festival Awards.

Year	Award	Category	Result	Ref.
2025	Golden Joystick Awards	Best Indie Game	Nominated	
2026	15th New York Game Awards	Statue of Liberty Award for Best World	Nominated	
2026	15th New York Game Awards	Excelsior Award for Best New York Game	Nominated	
2026	29th Annual D.I.C.E. Awards	Outstanding Achievement for an Independent Game	Nominated	
2026	26th Game Developers Choice Awards	Innovation Award	Nominated	
2026	28th Independent Games Festival Awards	Seumas McNally Grand Prize	Nominated	
2026	28th Independent Games Festival Awards	Excellence in Audio	Won	
2026	28th Independent Games Festival Awards	Excellence in Design	Nominated	
2026	28th Independent Games Festival Awards	Excellence in Narrative	Nominated	
2026	28th Independent Games Festival Awards	Nuovo Award	Nominated	
