= CLOP =

2012 video game

- Developer: Bennett Foddy
- Release: 2012
- Genre: Sports
- Mode: Single-player

CLOP is a 2012 Flash game made by Australian game designer Bennett Foddy. It is considered a spiritual successor to Foddy's previous game, QWOP, released four years prior which had gone on to become a viral sensation. The game is similar to QWOP in gameplay but the player is tasked with controlling a unicorn rather than an athletic runner and escort it to a destination.

== See also ==
- GIRP, another similar game by Foddy
