= Jonathan Weisbrod =

American Entrepreneur

Jonathan Weisbrod is an American entrepreneur and former producer. His projects include the drama-comedy feature, "Lies I Told My Little Sister" (2012), and comedy-horror feature "Bear With Us" (2014), in addition to award-winning student shorts, "Break A Leg" (2011), "Beyond Belief" (2012), among other student film projects.

== Education ==
Weisbrod received a B.F.A. at the NYU Tisch School of the Arts, and J.D. at Seton Hall University School of Law.

== Awards and nominations ==
- Best Comedy Nomination, 2012 Supershorts International Film Festival, London, England, for "Beyond Belief"
- Best Picture and Best Producing, 2012 New Voices & Visions Film Festival, New York University, for short film, "Break A Leg," directed by William J. Stribling.
- 2008 AFI (American Film Institute) Screen Nation Grand Prize, AFI Screen Education News, American Film Institute, July 21, 2008
