= Jump King =

2019 platform game

- Developer: Nexile
- Publishers: Nexile, Ukiyo Publishing
- Engine: MonoGame
- Platforms: Microsoft Windows; Nintendo Switch; PlayStation 4; Xbox One
- Release: Microsoft Windows; May 3, 2019; Switch, PS4, Xbox One; June 9, 2020
- Genre: Platform

Jump King is a 2019 platform game developed by Nexile. Jump King was released on Steam for Microsoft Windows on May 3, 2019. It was released for PlayStation 4, Nintendo Switch, and Xbox One on June 9, 2020. In the game, players must ascend a vertical map and avoid falling down by making careful jumps. Multiple free expansions for the game have been released since its launch.

The game received viral attention due to its difficulty and has been featured in Twitch live streams.

== Gameplay ==
The player controls a king who can move by either jumping or walking, and must reach the top of an extremely tall tower to beat the game. Jumps can be charged, which affects how far the player moves each time they perform a jump. Missing a jump can be punishing as falls can cause the player to lose a significant portion of their progress, and there are no checkpoints. The game encourages players to experiment and features multiple routes to reach the top of the tower and beat the game. Additionally, at the top of the tower, there is a "smoking hot babe", teased through dialogue at the beginning of the game.

In addition to the main game, there are two additional maps titled "New Babe+" and "Ghost of the Babe".

The game's soundtrack has a total of 33 different songs, which belong to different areas. As the player progresses further up the map, these songs accompany the location they are currently in.

The game's difficulty and style of gameplay has been compared to Getting Over It with Bennett Foddy.

== Reception ==
The game received mostly positive attention. Oliver Roderick of Switch Player noted the game's intentional difficulty, but described it as "truly solid". Similarly, Andrew Shaw of The Digital Fix praised the game's difficulty, soundtrack, and "beautifully pared-down but still vibrant and evocative 16-bit art style and equally retro sound effects." Other reviewers were critical of the game's difficulty, with Paul Collett of Finger Guns feeling that the game's challenge was "left to chance and [not] to player skill" despite the game not having any luck elements.

== See also ==
- Getting Over It with Bennett Foddy
- Only Up!
- A Difficult Game About Climbing
