= Titanium Court =

2026 video game by AP Thomson

- Developer: AP Thomson
- Publisher: Fellow Traveller
- Engine: Unity
- Platforms: Microsoft Windows; macOS; Android; iOS; Nintendo Switch; Nintendo Switch 2; PlayStation 5
- Release: Windows, macOS; April 23, 2026; Android, iOS, Switch, Switch 2, PS5; October 29, 2026
- Genres: Strategy; Match-3; Tower defense

Titanium Court is a strategy game developed by New York-based creator AP Thomson and published by Fellow Traveller, released on April 23, 2026. The game features a combination of match 3, tower defense and roguelike mechanics where the player controls the eponymous Court and battles against other rival Courts.

The first public demo of the game was released during the February 2026 Steam Next Fest where the game received its first widespread attention and subsequently appeared on several 'Best of Next Fest' lists.

The game was praised by critics, particularly for its writing. At the 2026 Independent Games Festival Awards, Titanium Court was nominated in four categories and won the Seumas McNally Grand Prize and the Excellence in Design award.

== Gameplay ==
Titanium Court is a match 3 puzzle role-playing video game. It also contains aspects of tower defense, point-and-click, roguelite, resource management, deckbuilder, and visual novel games. You must redesign the landscape to your advantage, such as arranging mountains near your court which slows enemies from reaching you. There are two phases to keep track of: High Tide and Low Tide. High Tide has the player match tiles into lines of three for resources and benefits. In Low Tide, resources are expended to deploy soldiers or farmers. Farmers gather resources during battle while soldiers engage in the battle itself.

== Reception ==
Reception

Aggregate scores
Aggregator	Score
Metacritic	87/100
OpenCritic	89% recommend (Note: Based on 10 reviews)

Review score
Publication	Score
PC Gamer (US)	74/100

AP Thomson receiving the Seumas McNally Grand Prize for Titanium Court at the 2026 Independent Games Festival.

Titanium Court received generally favorable reviews from critics, according to the review aggregation website Metacritic. Fellow review aggregator OpenCritic assessed that the game received "mighty" approval, being recommended by 89% of critics.

Critics praised the game's meta writing and upon release the game received favorable reviews. Rock Paper Shotgun likened it to that of Alice in Wonderland and described it as "somewhat lynchian" as well. Shaun Prescott described the game as a "brilliantly singular roguelite with a surplus of style" in his PC Gamer review, but also added "you're going to need to love match-three to want to stick around.", giving the game a score of 74.

At the 2026 Independent Games Festival Awards, Titanium Court was nominated in four categories and won the Seumas McNally Grand Prize and the Excellence in Design award. AP Thomson also received the Seumas McNally Grand Prize (and Nuovo Award) in 2025 for his work on Consume Me, making him the only back-to-back winner of the award.

Titanium Court received a nomination for "Best Indie Game" at the Golden Joystick Awards 2026.
