= Bennett Foddy =

Australian video game designer

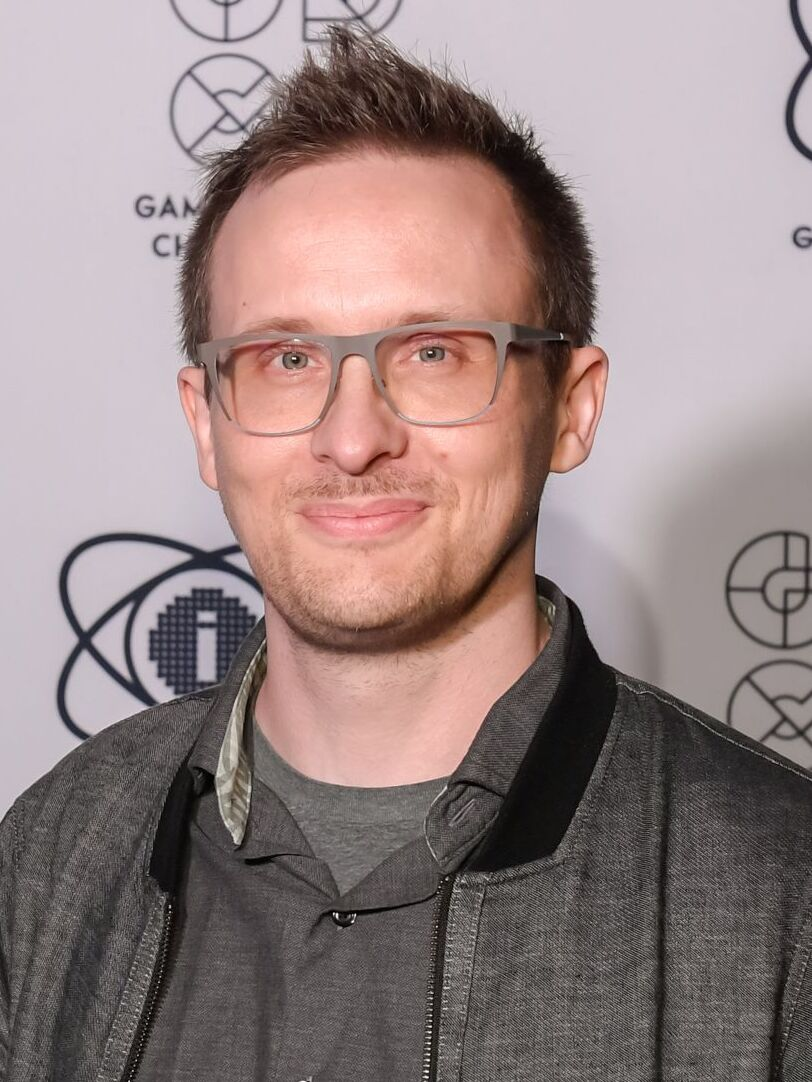
- Foddy in 2018
- Born: 1978 (age 47–48); Australia
- Education: University of Melbourne (PhD)
- Occupation: Video game designer
- Known for: QWOP, Getting Over It with Bennett Foddy, Baby Steps

Bennett Foddy (born 1978) is an Australian video game designer based in New York. He is known for creating QWOP and Getting Over It with Bennett Foddy.

Foddy was raised in Australia and trained as a moral philosopher on topics of drug addiction. He was a bassist in the electronic music group Cut Copy and a hobbyist game designer while he finished his dissertation. During his postdoctoral research at Princeton University and time on staff at Oxford University, Foddy developed games of very high difficulty, including QWOP (2008), which became an Internet sensation at the end of 2010 with the rise of new online social sharing tools. He later became an instructor at the NYU Game Center. His most famous game aside from QWOP is Getting Over It with Bennett Foddy, a philosophical, physics-based platform game released in 2017. He released Baby Steps in 2025.

== Early life and education ==
Bennett Foddy was born in Australia in 1978. His parents were academics. He studied philosophy in college and was working as a research assistant in the field when his childhood friend, Dan Whitford, started the Australian electronic group Cut Copy. Whitford was the sole writer for the first album but reached out to friends to expand the band. Foddy played bass, despite having little experience. When his duties to the band conflicted with his philosophy studies, he chose the latter. Foddy enrolled in a doctoral degree in philosophy in late 2003 at the University of Melbourne with an interest in cognitive science and human addiction and left Cut Copy in 2004. On the topic of leaving the band, he stated that the "touring life of waiting and partying did not fit my personality".

== Career ==
Foddy has said that his best design work happened while procrastinating on other work. He taught himself to program and design games starting in 2006 from online tutorials while working on his philosophy dissertation. In his first Flash game, Too Many Ninjas (2007), players defended their immobile ninja avatar against oncoming ninjas. The game mainly relies on reflexes and a small set of buttons. Its positive press encouraged Foddy to continue the pursuit. Still, Foddy hid this hobby from his colleagues to avoid the philosophy field's stigma against philosophers who do not wholly dedicate themselves to their philosophy work.

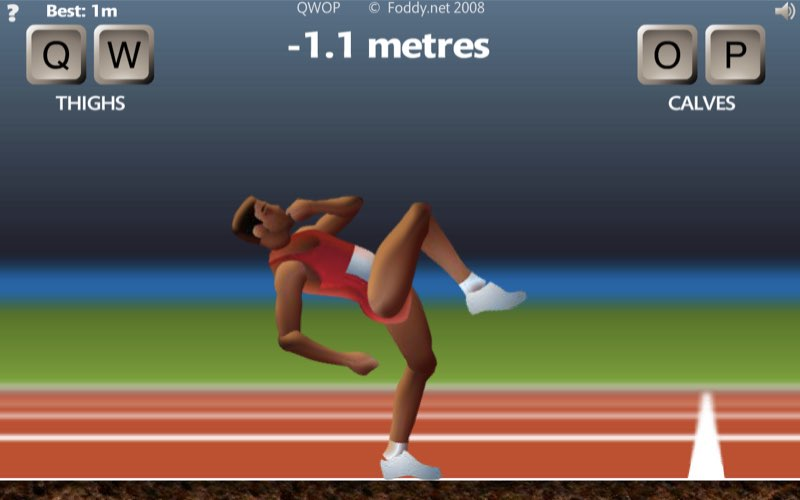
QWOP's title refers to the four keyboard keys used to move the muscles of the sprinter avatar.

He moved to the United States as a postdoctoral researcher at Princeton University from 2007 to 2010. Foddy wrote philosophy papers and lectured on topics of drug addiction. Meanwhile, he developed another simple game, QWOP, for release in 2008, in which the player uses the four keyboard keys of the game's title to control the muscles of an Olympic sprinter. It was a modest success at release but became an Internet sensation and one of his most recognizable titles following its popularisation on burgeoning websites Stumbleupon, Reddit, and YouTube in late 2010. QWOP enjoyed attention uncommon for indie games of its size. Kill Screen included the title in its 2011 Museum of Modern Art event and it appeared on the American television show The Office in 2012. As his postdoctoral work ended, Foddy's game design career outshined his philosophy career with the help of QWOP, but before he came to choose the former, Foddy served as the deputy director of Oxford University's Institute for Science and Ethics.

Foddy did not intend for QWOP to connect with his philosophy work. Still, he saw similarities between his use of reward–punishment cycles and the motivations behind addiction. He also worked on ascertaining the existence of game addiction and considered the intrinsic values of in-game rewards. Foddy later came to describe his game design aspirations as "literary", building atop a lineage of predecessors. In content, QWOP is based on the 1980s arcade game Track & Field. Foddy's childhood gaming experiences became touchstones for the themes he would develop in QWOP which would recur throughout his next titles. Foddy sought to recreate the vexing difficulty of games from his youth and the range of emotions they pique. He also wanted to create the "immediacy" of direct-to-TV video game appliances, which lacked the software load times characteristic of console games. Though several of his games prominently feature rhythm, it was not a consideration in his design.

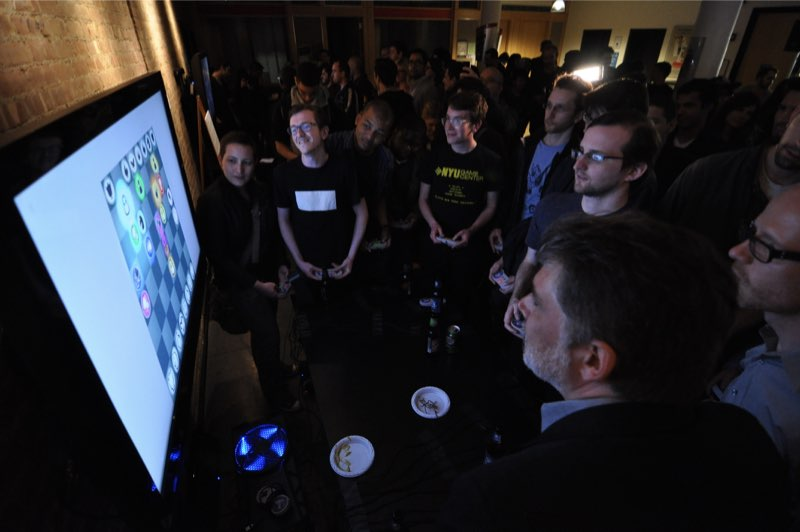
Bennett Foddy's Speed Chess, a 16-player chess deathmatch, debuted at NYU Game Center's 2013 No Quarter exhibition.

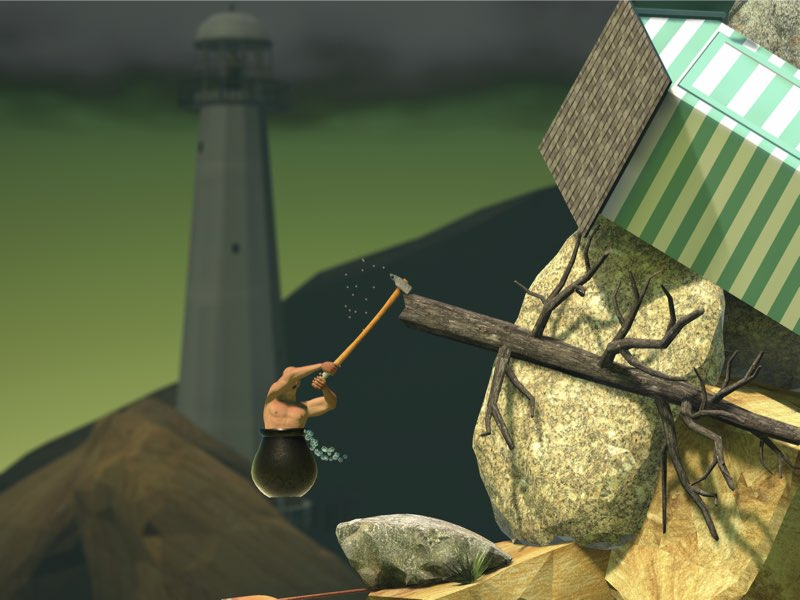
In Getting Over It with Bennett Foddy, the player-character ascends a mountain using only a rock climbing hammer.

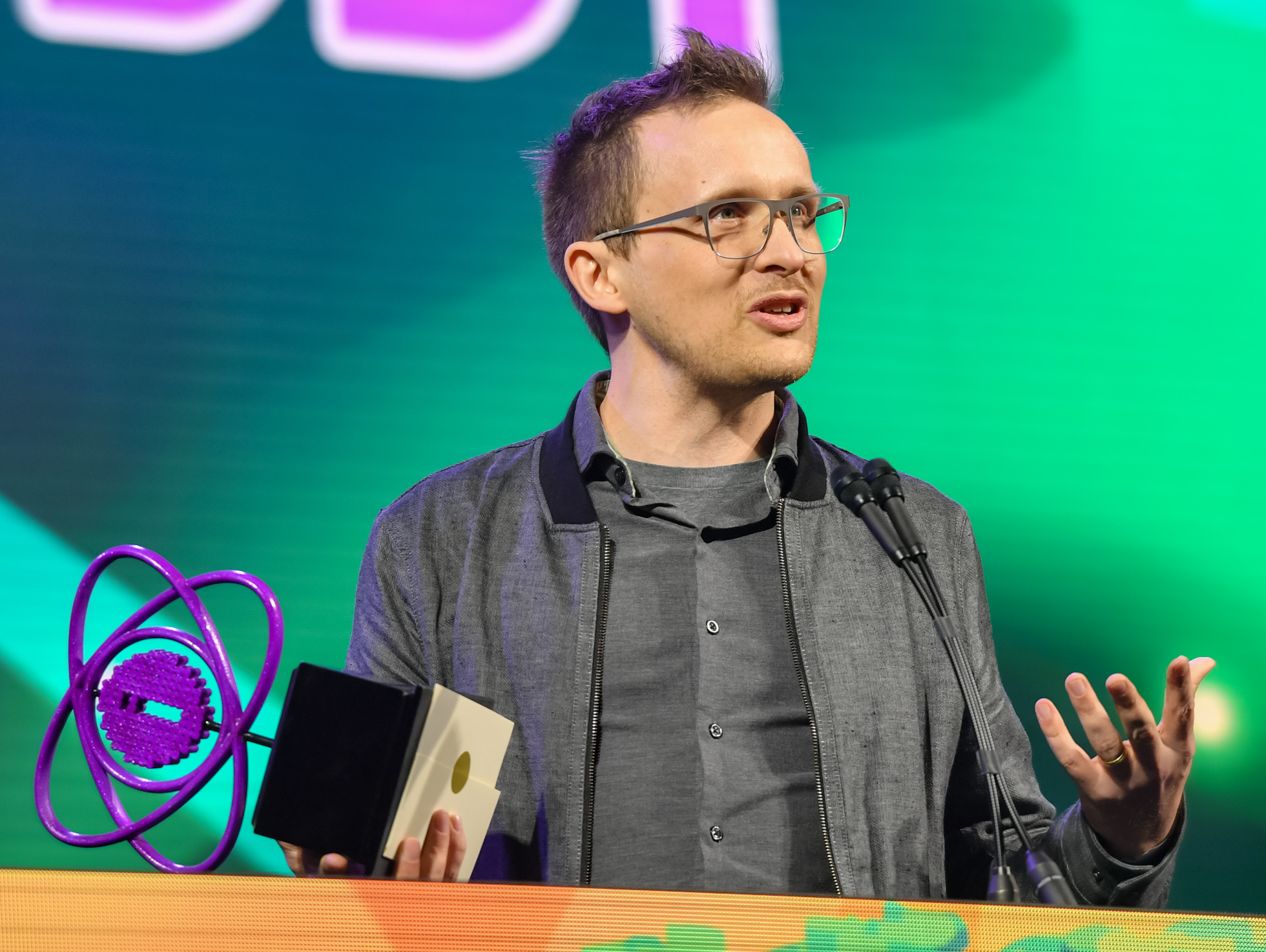
Foddy receiving the 2018 GDC Independent Games Festival Nuovo Award

His next game, GIRP (2011), is a rock climbing simulator in which the player presses keyboard keys assigned to rocks on a wall to flex and ascend its surface. Wired described the free game as "masochistically difficult", with the effect of making the player's keyboard similar to the physical skill game of Twister, in which the player grips the keyboard like the avatar grips the rock face. Like QWOP, both titles have awkward controls that push the player to embody the avatar once the controls are internalized. GIRP is designed for players to set their own goals, such as their maximum height, or once they reach the top, their own fastest score, rather than publicly comparing against an online leaderboard.

As New York University expanded its Game Center into Brooklyn in late 2013, Foddy taught his first studio class in game design. A colleague highlighted Foddy's expertise on "game feel": his use of in-game physics to create tension. Foddy created many other small games, including a 16-player chess deathmatch (Bennett Foddy's Speed Chess, 2013) and a maze of optical illusions (Zebra, 2016).

Foddy also expressed an interest in games history, particularly the English and European games not widely known in the United States. In 2014, his Indiecade presentation linked older, independently developed video games into the historical lineage of indie game development as it was contemporaneously known. In 2016, Foddy co-developed Multibowl, a competitive minigame compilation of scenes from 1980s and 1990s video games. Like the microgames of WarioWare, Foddy presents two-player, 30-second challenge scenarios culled from 230 commercial games, with a point awarded to the player who first completes the scenario's objective. Foddy was spurred by his interest in video game history and the accessibility of video game emulators. He privileged original titles in his selections. The game was exhibited at XOXO and Fantastic Arcade, and will not receive a public release to avoid legal issues.

Getting Over It with Bennett Foddy was released in late 2017. The player is tasked with scaling a mountain as a man stuck inside a cauldron using only a hammer. Wired described the game as both "uproariously, darkly funny" and "challenging to the point of impossibility." Foddy narrates the title on the topic of failure. The game was popular with video game streamers and nominated for the Independent Games Festival's top prize.

== Personal life ==
Foddy is married and lives in New York City as of 2018. His wife designs hats.

== Ludography ==
Credits
Year	Game	Collaborator(s)	Notes	Ref.
2007	Too Many Ninjas			
2008	Little Master Cricket			
2008	QWOP			
2010	VVVVVV	Terry Cavanagh		
2011	GIRP			
2011	Poleriders			
2012	CLOP			
2012	Get On Top			
2013	Bennett Foddy's Speed Chess			
2013	Cheque Please	Pendleton Ward	Unreleased	
2016	Zebra			
2016	Multibowl			
2017	Getting Over It with Bennett Foddy			
2017	Universal Paperclips	Frank Lantz	Programming (space combat feature)	
2019	Ape Out	Gabe Cuzzillo	Artist	
2022	Zipper		Included with the Playdate console	
2025	Baby Steps	Gabe Cuzzillo & Maxi Boch		
2026	Big Walk	House House	Playtester	
