= Trackmania (2020 video game) =

- Cover art
- Developer: Ubisoft Nadeo
- Publisher: Ubisoft
- Composer: Elliot "Ramova" Callighan
- Series: TrackMania
- Platforms: Windows; PlayStation 4; PlayStation 5; Xbox One; Xbox Series X/S
- Release: Windows; July 1, 2020; Consoles, Cloud; May 15, 2023
- Genre: Racing
- Modes: Single-player, multiplayer

Trackmania is a racing video game developed by Ubisoft Nadeo and published by Ubisoft, and is part of the TrackMania series. It was released on July 1, 2020, for Windows. A remake of TrackMania Nations, it was given the soft reboot title of Trackmania. The base game is free-to-play, with additional content available with a paid subscription model, including community tracks, online events and car customization. The game was also released for consoles and cloud platforms on May 15, 2023. The game has received mixed to positive reviews, with the gameplay being received positively, and its subscription model being criticized.

== Gameplay ==
Trackmania is a soft reboot of the eponymous series, and by extension, a remake of Trackmania Nations. It features gameplay similar to that of previous titles in the series, in which the player must race from start to finish on a selected track in the quickest time possible, with a heavy emphasis on fast-paced stunts and arcade behaviour.

Trackmania features the return of the Stadium environment seen in previous entries, but all blocks and track pieces that were seen in previous games have been removed and replaced entirely by a new set of blocks built from scratch. For example, in addition to standard road and dirt surfaces, a new ice surface was introduced, containing flat and bobsleigh-style blocks. The game also features tools that allows players to create their own custom blocks and objects, which in turn can be uploaded and featured in-game for other players to use in their own creations.

Trackmania also features the return of 3 other environments, called "Snow", "Rally" and "Desert", each environment featuring a new car and many new building blocks. These 3 environments were also previously featured in other Trackmania games, such as TrackMania United.

Previous games in the series featured a permanent campaign of 65 tracks, however Trackmania replaces this with a seasonal campaign of 25 tracks, which rotates every three months, alongside a permanent "Training" campaign of 25 tracks which remains available to all players. Players with Club access receive retroactive, permanent access to past campaigns, however, the leaderboards in these campaigns are locked and will not have any effect on global leaderboards should a player improve their personal best time on any track in a past campaign.

"Trophies" are given to players for certain accomplishments, and award points for the level of trophy received. For example, winning a Cup of the Day in division 1 will give 1 trophy 7, which is worth 1,000,000 points, and being first in the official campaign when it finishes will give 1 trophy 9, which is worth 100,000,000 points.

In addition, Track of the Days and Cup of the Days are available to players with Club access. The Track of the Day is a user-made map chosen by the developers and rotates every day. It highlights a well-built map with calculated corners and beautiful scenery. The Cup of the Day is a competition run three times a day on the Track of the Day in a round-based format. The mode begins with a 15 minute seeding phase in time attack, where players must set the best time they can on a global leaderboard. After this phase, players are then matched together in divisions of 64 players each to begin the knockout phase. At the end of every round, players who have finished in the bottom positions, or who have failed to finish, are eliminated. The bottom 4 players are eliminated in the rounds with 64 to 17 players, the bottom 2 are eliminated in the rounds with 16 to 9 players and only the last player is eliminated in the rounds from 8 to 2 players. At the end of the match, there is one winner.

=== Content and Gameplay Updates ===
Trackmania has received several updates since its initial release which have added gameplay features.

On November 2, 2020, a "Cup of the Day" gameplay mode was released in beta, which runs alongside every newly released "Track of the Day". The gameplay mode has been positively received, with players citing its fun factor and replay value. The "Cup of the Day" mode was fully released on December 12, 2020.

On February 4, 2021, a matchmaking gameplay mode was released in beta. It features two teams of players racing against each other on a randomly selected track on the current seasonal campaign, with the goal being for each team to finish in as high a position as they possibly can on each round. Each position attributes a certain number of points to a players' team. At the end of each round, the team with the most points wins the round; the first team to win 5 rounds wins the match. The mode also features a ranking ladder, which players can move up or down depending on wins and losses in a match. Matchmaking was positively received by players, although some have criticized the decision for a 1v1 option to have not been implemented. Matchmaking was fully released on 1 June 2021, and was renamed to Ranked.

On June 12, 2021, Nadeo announced the release of the "Royal" gameplay mode, as well as several new blocksets, including water, plastic blocks and animated and dynamic items. Plastic has very high acceleration at low speeds, and hitting into it on your side or roof will cause you to "plastic bounce" sending you in the opposite direction. The "Super Royal" mode was also added which is a large game of Royal happening three times per day.

On August 11, 2021, Nadeo made Cup of the Day available three times a day, instead of just once, to let people from all timezones participate. The new times were 7pm, 3am, and 11am CEST/CET.

On October 1, 2022, Nadeo made improvements to ice and water, fixing the infamous "ice-wiggle" which could be used to gain time on flat ice parts, changing bobsleigh physics to no longer favor controller as much, and also fixing water wiggles where you could bounce sideways in water to gain speed.

On December 14, 2022, Nadeo added over 290 new blocks and items, many around the "show" theme with new lights and dynamic signs but also including some new stages and canopies.

On March 29, 2023, Nadeo added 150 new blocks and items, as well as improving some UI and fixing some bugs.

On May 15, 2023, Trackmania was released for Xbox One, Xbox Series X/S, PlayStation 4, and PlayStation 5. Almost everything is the same as it was on PC, but there is a new track editor designed specifically for consoles players, which includes larger pieces of blocks to make building easier, but it can also limit possibilities.

On July 1, 2023, Nadeo introduced a new campaign progression system, fixed bugs including the ice-wiggle which was never fully patched out, and added new blocks.

On November 21, 2023, coinciding with the 20th anniversary of the TrackMania franchise, Nadeo announced the release of additional car types and blocksets originally used in the Alpine, Desert, and Rally environments from the TrackMania 2003 game, affectionately referred to as the "original trilogy". The Alpine car, now known as the Snow car, and its associated blockset, released the same day. The new blocks introduced a new surface to the game, wood, which has very high grip making it impossible to drift. The snow car is styled similarly to off-road pickup trucks, and drives very differently from the stadium car, with a smaller turning radius, altered acceleration, and higher center of mass. The Snow Discovery campaign was released.

On January 9, 2024, Starter access was changed to only include the first 10 maps of the official campaign instead of all 25, Standard access was removed, and the price of Club access was lowered from $29.99 to $19.99 per year. This was a controversial update as many players already didn't like the subscription based system.

On February 27, 2024, the Rally car was released. The Rally car has a tighter turning radius than the stadium car, but much lower grip in most circumstances. This update also fixed the snow car's "landing bugs", which would cause the car to jump and lose speed after some landings. The Rally Discovery campaign was released.

On May 22, 2024, the Desert car was released. The car is distinctive in that it is unstable while turning, and will tip on two wheels. The update also featured 70 new blocks and 200 variables into the game. The Desert Discovery campaign was released.

On July 1, 2024, the Stunt gamemode was released. It includes flips and jumps and the aim is to get the best score possible. You get points for how long you are in the air, how many flips you do and how clean the landing was. It was not received very well as it does not match well with the competitive nature of the game.

On October 1, 2024, the Platform gamemode was released, along with a discovery campaign where maps were released weekly. This mode has players trying to beat the track with as little respawns as possible. At first, many players didn't like it as the tracks in the campaign were simple and easy to finish. However, the later tracks proved to be a real challenge and some of them saw no completions in zero respawns until days after. The mode was not used much after the first few weeks.

On December 17, 2024, a weekly free-to-play campaign called "Weekly Shorts" was released. Every Sunday, Nadeo publishes five new short maps, generally created by the community mappers. Throughout the week, the leaderboard times and replays on the new maps remain "secret", encouraging the players to independently discover unique strategies. On March 10, 2025, the new format of Weekly Shorts was introduced where the maps fit the following five styles: "Wide" (open roads without obstacles), "Slow" (low-speed surfaces and tight road turns), "Puzzle" (intended cuts and re-routes to find), "Fast" (high-speed gameplay), and "LOL" (tricky and luck-based maps).

On July 1, 2025, Ranked was changed from a 3v3 mode to a 2v2 mode. New blocks were added, freecam was enabled for controller, and Track of the Days could be seen in the loading screens.

On January 27, 2026, four new track landscapes were introduced from the styles of older games – the white shore, green coast (valley), red island (canyon) and blue bay (lagoon) vistas. New in-game competitions were also added. The Cup of the Week was introduced, with the same format as Cup of the Day, but held weekly and on one of the campaign tracks. If a player qualifies into division 1, they join the Elite Cup of that week, which is instead held on a black track of the campaign, tracks designed especially to be used for esports. The Elite Cup also follows a similar Cup of the Day, but less players are eliminated per round, and you receive points which will serve as part of the qualification process for the Esports World Cup and the Esports Nations Cup. The points are very top-heavy, and only the top 5 results count out of the 10 Elite Cups.

== Events and esports ==
Trackmania has had success in esports, building off the limited success in previous Trackmania titles.

=== Major Events ===
==== 2020 ====
Since Trackmania was launched in the middle of 2020, the year did not see very many major tournaments. The largest events were the ZrT Cup, hosted by Zerator in July, Trackmania Grand League in November, Twitch Rivals in October with a $25,000 prizepool and Trackmania Holiday Showdown in December.

==== 2021 ====
The Trackmania Grand League's various different rounds and competitions in 2021 added up to a total prize-pool of $61,554, a much larger amount than what the players were used to. Other major competitions included Gamers Assembly in April, and ZrT Cup in July.

==== 2022 ====
Trackmania Grand League continued with a total prizepool of $44,920. Many other competitions started to get larger prizepools including Trackmania Formula League, Trackadia, Kacky Reloaded, Arctic Gaming Experience, TimeHunters, Zerator Cup, Comic Con Baltics, Twitch Rivals, Efrei Trackmania Cup, and Gamers Assembly. Deep Dip was released, a tower map famous for being difficult and punishing.

==== 2023 ====
Trackmania Grand League was revamped into Trackmania World Tour, with a prizepool of $91,205, larger than ever. The format was also changed to 2v2. This year, the other major competitions were Twitch Rivals, Ascension, Comic Con Baltics, XPEvo, Kacky Reloaded, Maji Mondays, Trial & Error, BDSxPringles, Cupra Cup, and Efrei Trackmania Cup.

==== 2024 ====
The Trackmania World Tour had a prizepool of only $27,145. The other major competitions were Formula E, Kacky Reloaded, XPEvo, Volvic Duo Dash, Beacon World League, GameWard Cup, Comic Con Baltics, and Maji Mondays. Deep Dip 2 was released, a sequel of Deep Dip, made even harder than before. Many streamers played this map, which boosted the popularity of the game, and it took over a month to beat. It had a prizepool of $32,694.

==== 2025 ====
The Trackmania World Tour had a prizepool of $32,639. The other competitions included Big Trackmania Cup, Kacky Reloaded, Out of the Blue, Die Bayerische Duo Dash, XPEvo, Comic Con Baltics, Trent on Track, Beacon Duo League, and Twitch Rivals. Red Bull Faster was an event funded by Red Bull and hosted by Wirtual with a $51,891 prizepool. Deep Slip was a tower map inspired by Deep Dip, but where everything is ice. The event lasted 2 weeks.

==== 2026 ====
Trackmania joined the Esports World Cup and the Esports Nations Cup, which will have prizepools of $500,000 and $250,000 respectively. Wirtual hosted the second Red Bull Faster with the same prize pool, and the Trackmania Games was a large event similar to the Olympics where countries compete in different disciplines. Deep Slid was another tower map, this time with the theme of driving everything in reverse and the event lasted a week. Other notable competitions include Dreamhack Birmingham, which also contributed to qualifying for EWC, and Maji Mondays.

== Reception ==
Reception

Aggregate score
Aggregator	Score
Metacritic	74/100

Review score
Publication	Score
IGN	7/10

Trackmania received an aggregate score of 74/100 on Metacritic.

Benjamin Schmädig of 4Players rated the game 85/100, praising its time trials and track editor.

Alex Santa Maria of IGN rated the game 7/10, saying that it was "addictive" and had a robust amount of content, but criticized its menus as looking "cobbled-together". He also criticized the idea of "gating off access" through a subscription model, saying that it risked hindering the game's long-term community support.

Gianluca Musso of Eurogamer Italia also rated the game 7/10, saying that while it was beautiful and fun, he criticized the fact that it was aimed solely at the hardcore audience.

The game was initially criticized by players due to unstable servers and unoptimized netcode; however, these issues have been mostly resolved over time via patches and updates.
