= Consume Me =

2025 video game

- Developers: Jenny Jiao Hsia; AP Thomson
- Publisher: Hexacutable
- Directors: Jenny Jiao Hsia, AP Thomson
- Engine: Unity
- Platforms: Windows, macOS, iOS
- Release: Windows, Mac; September 25, 2025 iOS; June 2, 2026
- Genre: Life simulation
- Mode: Single-player

Consume Me is a semi-autobiographical life simulation video game developed by Jenny Jiao Hsia and AP Thomson and published by Hexacutable. It centers primarily around the player character's daily schedule, with a particular emphasis on the effects of an eating disorder on their day-to-day life.

== Gameplay ==
Consume Me has a semi-autobiographical story, revolving around the daily, teenage life of developer Jenny Jiao Hsia. The gameplay consists of a series of minigames that simulate everyday activities, such as eating, exercising and applying makeup. The player needs to manage Jenny's schedule by strategically allocating her limited time throughout the day. In addition, the player must maintain different character attributes, including energy, mood and money, which are affected by the outcomes of the minigames.

== Development ==
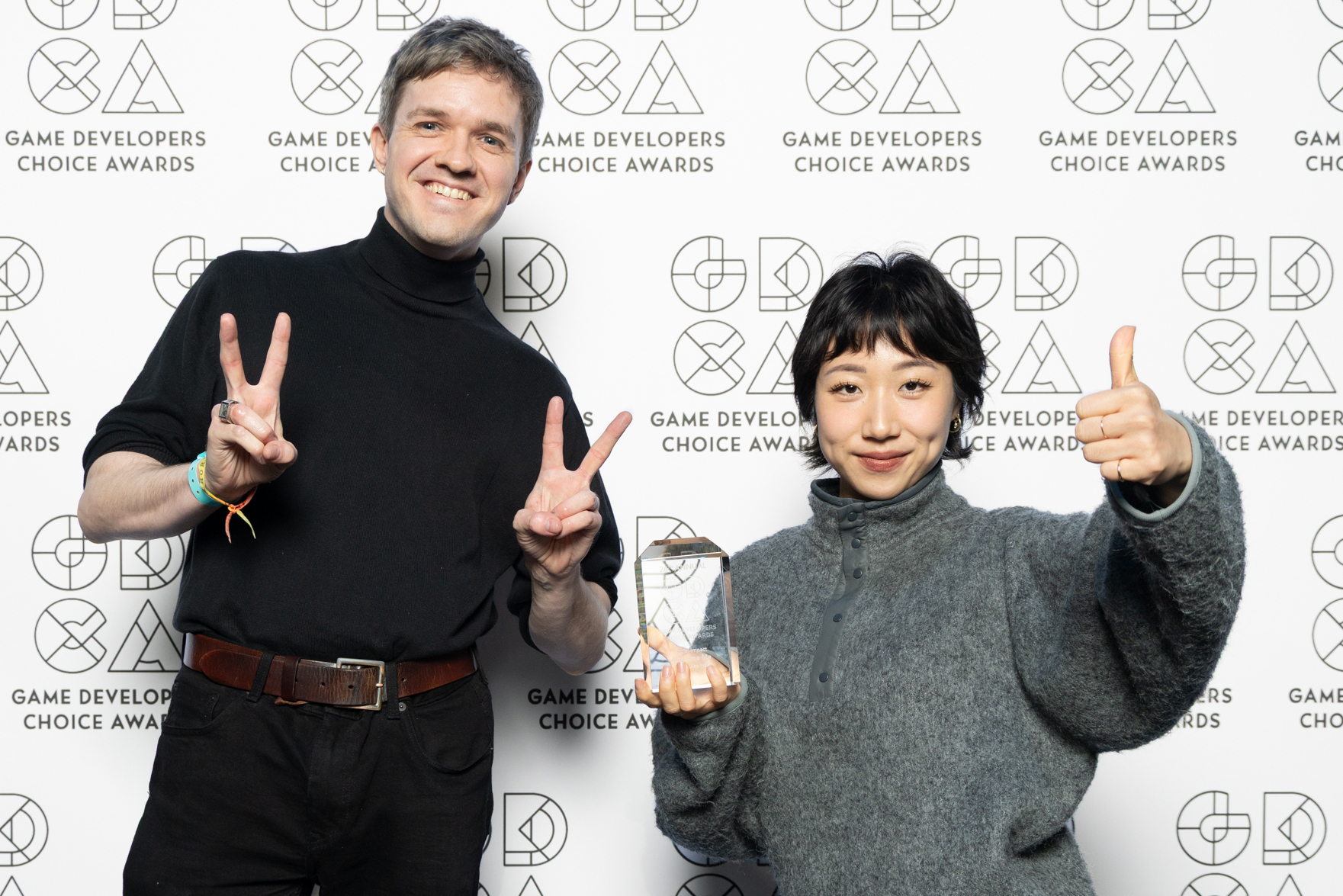
AP Thomson (left) and Jenny Jiao Hsia at the Game Developers Choice Awards 2026

Jenny Jiao Hsia and AP Thomson co-directed the game. They met as students in the NYU Game Center program and have collaborated on multiple projects, including Beglitched. Consume Me began as Hsia's capstone project for her undergraduate degree. Hsia prototyped the minigames, created the art direction and narrative, and built the non-interactive sequences. Thomson programmed most of the game, designed its systems, and contributed its text and musical scene. They were joined by Ken "coda" Snyder (soundtrack) and Violet W-P (sound design). Jie En Lee created much of the game's art.

Prototypes of two minigames were playable at the Victoria and Albert Museum's Videogames: Design/Play/Disrupt exhibitions in Kensington and Dundee between 2018 and 2019, exhibited alongside objects from Hsia's moodboard and her sketchbook. The game was built with the Unity game engine and released on September 25, 2025 for Windows and macOS. A version for iPhone and iPad was released on June 2, 2026.

== Reception ==
Reception

Aggregate scores
Aggregator	Score
Metacritic	(PC) 80/100
OpenCritic	84% recommend

Consume Me received "generally favorable" reviews from critics, according to review aggregator website Metacritic. OpenCritic determined that 84% of critics recommended the game.

=== Awards ===
Year	Award	Category	Result	Ref.
2025	Independent Games Festival	Seumas McNally Grand Prize	Won	
2025	Independent Games Festival	Wings Award	Won	
2025	Independent Games Festival	Excellence in Design	Nominated	
2025	Independent Games Festival	Excellence in Narrative	Nominated	
2025	Independent Games Festival	Excellence in Visual Art	Nominated	
2025	Independent Games Festival	Nuovo Award	Won	
2025	Golden Joystick Awards	Best Indie Game - Self Published	Nominated	
2025	The Game Awards 2025	Games for Impact	Nominated	
2026	15th New York Game Awards	Off Broadway Award for Best Indie Game	Nominated	
2026	15th New York Game Awards	Herman Melville Award for Best Writing in a Game	Nominated	
2026	29th Annual D.I.C.E. Awards	Outstanding Achievement for an Independent Game	Nominated	
2026	29th Annual D.I.C.E. Awards	Outstanding Achievement in Story	Nominated	
2026	26th Game Developers Choice Awards	Best Debut	Honorable mention	
2026	26th Game Developers Choice Awards	Innovation Award	Honorable mention	
2026	26th Game Developers Choice Awards	Social Impact	Won	
2026	22nd British Academy Games Awards	Debut Game	Nominated	
2026	22nd British Academy Games Awards	Game Beyond Entertainment	Nominated	
