= Fortune-499 =

Role-playing video game

- Producer: AP Thomson
- Designers: AP Thomson; Jenny Jiao Hsia
- Platforms: Microsoft Windows, MacOS
- Release: February 2, 2018
- Genre: Role-playing video game
- Mode: Single-player

Fortune-499 is a role-playing video game in which the player takes on the role of an oracle working in the "magical resources" department of an unnamed corporation, and has to prevent an acquisition by monsters after the company makes an initial public offering. In-game combat is card-based and takes the form of rock paper scissors matches. The game was initially released for Windows in February 2018.

== Gameplay ==
Fortune-499 is a card-based role-playing game. The player takes on the role of Cassie, short for Cassandra, an oracle working in the "magical resources" department of an unnamed corporation. After the company makes an initial public offering, monsters begin appearing, and Cassie has to use her powers as an oracle to prevent a merger and acquisition by the monsters by fighting them.

Gameplay screenshot from Fortune-499

The turn-based battle system of Fortune-499 takes the form of rock paper scissors matches, which the player can influence using spells of which Cassie is capable (including buffs and debuffs as well as damage-dealing effects). Additionally, the player can draw up to four cards per turn from a deck to predict the likelihood of the opponent using rock, paper, or scissors, and also to boost MP or HP. The player moves through various rooms, in which some environmental puzzles are also included. Some rooms have photocopiers which allow the player to print additional cards, paper shredders to remove cards from the deck, or filing cabinets to change the order of cards in the deck.

== Development ==
Developed by AP Thomson, who previously created Beglitched, and co-developed and -designed by Jenny Jiao Hsia who also assisted with Beglitched, Fortune-499 was released for PC on February 2, 2018. It has a minimalist and retro art style that uses pastel colors and simple lines, and a soundtrack made up of guitars with an audio filter.

=== Release ===
Fortune-499 was initially exclusively available through Humble Bundle, and was made available on Steam and Itch.io later in 2018. In June 2020, it was included in the "Bundle for Racial Justice and Equality" on Itch.io. It is playable on Microsoft Windows and MacOS.

== Reception ==
In VentureBeat, Stephanie Chan gave Fortune-499 a score of 88/100, praising the gameplay, dialogue, and Cassie character while criticizing the facts that dialogue is unskippable and that finishing the game took only four hours. Suggesting that more development of Cassie's character arc might have been beneficial, Chan concluded that the game was "a charming package. It's got witchcraft, mid-20s malaise, and puns and witty monsters galore [...] It's a fantastic blend of nostalgia and modern sensibilities, with terrific art and soundtrack to boot."

In Kotaku, Heather Alexandra described Fortune-499 as short but fun, writing that "it holds the player's attention and is worth checking out." In PC Gamer, Jessica Famularo praised the sound design and card-based battle system, describing the game as "quite a pleasant surprise" and writing that it "packs a lot of personality into its short playtime, weaving an effective story of capitalist humdrum".

Fortune-499 received an honorable mention for Excellence in Narrative at the 2019 Independent Games Festival.
