= GIRP =

2011 video game

- Developer: Bennett Foddy
- Release: 2011
- Genre: Sports
- Mode: Single-player

GIRP is a 2011 rock-climbing simulator Flash game by Australian game developer Bennett Foddy. It is a sequel to his 2008 game QWOP. GIRP was nominated for the Nuovo award for innovative games at the 2012 Independent Games Festival, but lost out to Daniel Benmergui's Storyteller.

== Gameplay ==
In the game, the player presses keyboard keys assigned to rocks on a wall to flex and ascend its surface. All the while, the water level is rising higher by the second, and if it reaches over the player's head, they will drown and have to start over. Wired described the game as "masochistically difficult" and "maddeningly compulsive", with the effect of making the player's keyboard similar to the physical skill game of Twister. Foddy designed GIRP to hijack the neurological reward-system by allowing players to set their own achievable goals in the game.

A sanctioned multiplayer version of GIRP intended for festival use was released under the name Mega GIRP by game developer Douglas Wilson.
