= Jenny Jiao Hsia =

Video game developer

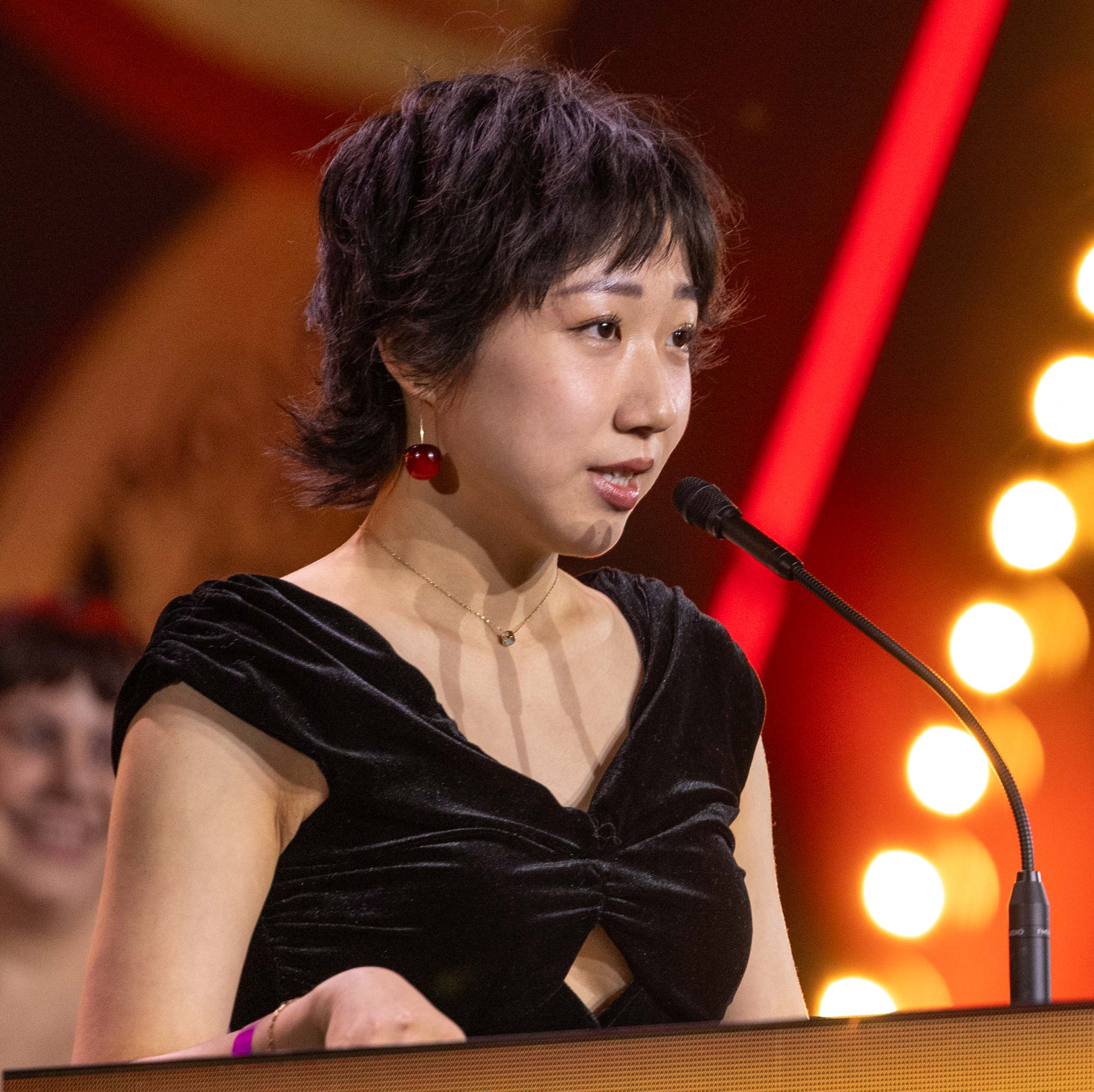
- Hsia in 2025
- Born: 1994 (age 31–32)
- Education: New York University
- Occupation: Video Game Designer
- Years active: 2016–present
- Notable work: Beglitched, Consume Me
- Website: qdork.com

Jenny Jiao Hsia (born 1994) is a video game developer best known for Beglitched and Consume Me.

== Selected works ==
- Beglitched, 2016
- Wobble Yoga, a QWOP-like game of holding yoga poses, created for the 2016 Ludum Dare game jam
- Morning Makeup Madness, a 2016 minigame inspired by three-minute makeup challenges on YouTube
- and i made sure to hold your head sideways, for the 2016 Flat Game game jam
- chat with me, a long-distance relationship simulator
- Fortune-499, 2018
- Consume Me, 2025
