= Wirtual =

Norwegian YouTuber and video game streamer

- Born: Øyvind Iversen; 12 September 1999 (age 27); Romerike, Norway
- Occupations: Video game streamer, YouTuber

Twitch information
- Channel: wirtual
- Followers: 579,000

YouTube information
- Channels: wirtual; WirtualTV
- Subscribers: 2.06 million
- Views: 637 million
- Last updated: 2026-07-11

Øyvind Iversen, better known as Wirtual is a Norwegian video game streamer and YouTuber known primarily for playing and competing in the TrackMania racing game series, as well as being a co-host for the Red Bull Faster tournament. He won the Best Speedrun Streamer award at the 2023 Streamer Awards.

== Career ==
Since 2013, Wirtual has been an avid TrackMania player and has participated in various TrackMania competitions and events. Since 2019, he has also made content about the game on YouTube.

In July 2021, Wirtual participated in the Summer Games Done Quick event, where he played Trackmania blindfolded.

In July 2022, Wirtual released a Trackmania map called Midori as an attempt to create a map for the daily competition, Track Of The Day. Wirtual also gave a $1000 prize pool in a time attack mode to encourage people to beat the target time that he set. He revealed that he had used an analog keyboard to limit the car's steering to a range not normally possible. Nadeo, Trackmania’s developer, clarified in a social media post that using software to set specific steering values was an unfair advantage and was thus not allowed. Shortly after, Nadeo reworked ice physics to limit the competitive advantage of analog input devices on ice.

In 2023, Wirtual participated in the online amateur chess tournament for streamers, PogChamps. He won 5 points in the group stage and won the consolation bracket.

In 2025 and 2026, Wirtual co-hosted and broadcast the Red Bull Faster tournament organized by Red Bull.

=== Tower Maps ===
In 2022, Wirtual participated in the community-hosted Deep Dip event, where players raced to complete a very difficult map in the form of a tower with no checkpoints, where he finished in second place. In 2024, he took part in the Deep Dip II event featuring a similarly designed (though more difficult) tower map, though he later decided to bow out of the competition, citing the overwhelming difficulty and time investment negatively affecting him. He eventually finished the map in 10th place. In 2025, Wirtual participated in the Deep Slip event, which featured an ice-themed Deep-Dip-style tower map, becoming the first player to complete the map 12 days after the event began. In 2026, he also took part in the Deep Slid event, which is again the same theme, but this time every jump has to be driven backwards. He was the third player to finish after 5 days.

He has also released multiple videos on his YouTube channel covering the tower maps.

=== Involvement with Riolu ===
In May 2021, Wirtual and Trackmania community member "donadigo" launched an investigation of several top TrackMania players, who were suspected and later confirmed to be cheating using slow motion. The most notable of these players was Riolu, a well-known community figure who was found by the investigation to have cheated thousands of records over the course of more than a decade.

Prior to the publicization of his cheating, Riolu had managed to hold the world records on all 200 of the official maps in Trackmania Turbo, as well as 62 out of 65 of the official maps in Trackmania 2: Canyon. He had also built a successful career as a Trackmania streamer, and was a friend of Wirtual. When Wirtual publicly accused Riolu and other top players of cheating, Riolu in turn accused Wirtual during a live stream of blackmail and of instigating a witch hunt. As a consequence, Wirtual received considerable backlash from the community, and ultimately had to expedite the publication of his and donadigo's report. After the stream, Riolu became publicly inactive on Trackmania and social media. The investigation prompted Nadeo to initiate a widespread cheating investigation throughout various games within the franchise and motivated the creation and widespread adoption of the fan-made "Competitive Patch", designed to make cheating more difficult by logging programs injecting into the game.

In February 2024, Wirtual published a video to YouTube speculating that Riolu had returned to Trackmania under the identity "92BOB". He later stated that he received criticism for appearing to endorse an attempt at doxxing 92BOB.

In March 2025, Wirtual followed up on his post from the previous year with a second investigation, in which he accused Riolu of playing under a multitude of aliases including 92BOB and Eddy Reising. In particular, Riolu fabricated the Eddy Reising identity—which he used to interact with the Trackmania community on YouTube and Discord—based on a childhood friend of the same name. Moreover, Wirtual found that Riolu had, since the first investigation in 2021, been using these aliases as sock puppets, flooding leaderboards and harassing community members on YouTube and Reddit. In response, Nadeo purged Riolu's records for a violation of fair play.

== Awards and nominations ==
Year	Ceremony	Category	Result	Ref.
2021	The Streamer Awards	Best Speedrun Streamer	Nominated	
2022	The Streamer Awards	Best Speedrun Streamer	Nominated	
2023	The Streamer Awards	Best Speedrun Streamer	Won	
2024	The Streamer Awards	Best Speedrun Streamer	Nominated	
