= Beglitched =

2016 video game

- Developer: Hexecutable
- Publisher: Hexecutable
- Engine: Unity
- Platforms: Linux, macOS, Windows, iOS
- Release: macOS, Windows; October 7, 2016 iOS; March 11, 2017
- Genre: Puzzle
- Mode: Single-player

Beglitched is a 2016 tile-matching video game. It won Best Student Game at the 2016 Independent Games Festival Awards.

== Gameplay ==
Beglitched is a match three game with themes of hacking, computer viruses, and spam.

== Development ==
Jenny Jiao Hsia and Alec Thompson developed Beglitched within the NYU Game Center's incubator. The game released for macOS and Windows in October 2016. An iOS release followed in March 2017.

== Reception ==
Beglitched won the Best Student Game category at the 2016 Independent Games Festival Awards.

== See also ==
- Fortune-499
