= Getting Over It with Bennett Foddy =

2017 video game

- Developer: Bennett Foddy
- Designer: Bennett Foddy
- Engine: Unity
- Platforms: Windows; macOS; iOS; Android; Linux
- Release: Windows; October 6, 2017; macOS, iOS; December 6, 2017; Android; April 25, 2018; Linux; 2018
- Genre: Platform
- Mode: Single-player

Getting Over It with Bennett Foddy is a platform game developed by the titular Bennett Foddy. The game was released as part of the October 2017 Humble Monthly, on October 6, 2017, where it went on to be played by over 2.7 million players. A Steam version of the game was later released by Foddy on December 6, 2017, with a release on iOS that same day. The Android version was later released on April 25, 2018. The Linux version was made available for beta testing in August 11, 2018, and received a public release in the following day.

== Gameplay ==
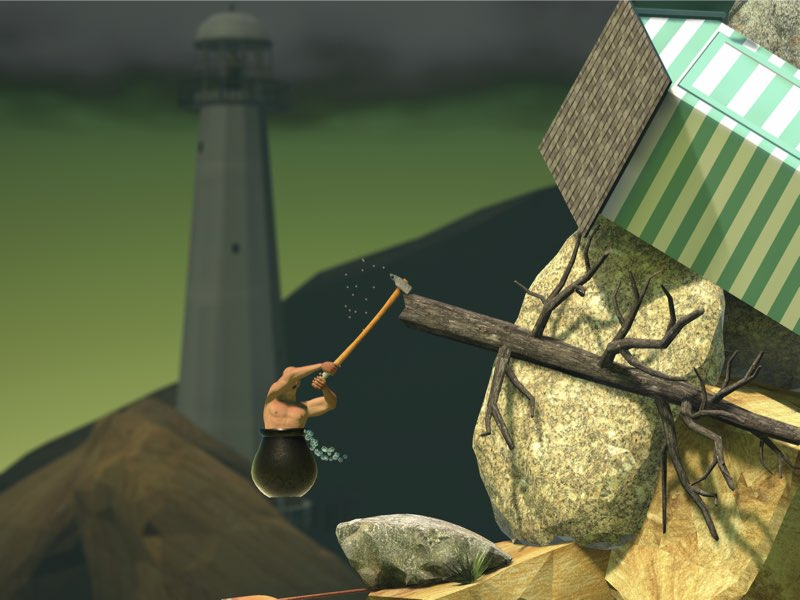
The player-controlled character ascends a mountain using only a hammer.

Getting Over It revolves around the player-controlled character, residing in a large metal cauldron and named Diogenes in reference to the pot-dwelling philosopher. He wields a Yosemite hammer, which he can use to grip objects and move himself. Using the mouse or trackpad, (Note: Controllers are supported, but make the game considerably harder because of the lack of precision the joysticks provide.) the player tries to move the man's upper body and sledgehammer in order to climb a steep mountain. As the player progresses up the mountain, they are at a constant risk of losing some or all of their progress; there are no checkpoints.

The game concludes when the player reaches the highest point of the map, entering space. Closing credits fade in, where at the conclusion, a message asks players if they are recording the gameplay. If the player indicates that they are not, the game provides access to a chatroom populated by other players who completed the game.

== Narration ==
Getting Over It is accompanied by voice-over commentary from Bennett Foddy, who does philosophical observations about the climb up the mountain. He also talks about how the Jazzuo's game Sexy Hiking inspired him into crafting this kind of experience. According to Foddy, the narration was initially supposed to be much more sarcastic. However, he felt like making it "more or less totally encouraging" instead would be better, since players would already be frustrated by the game itself. The resulting design was a script that mixes provoking one-liners with straight, uplifting phrases.

== Development ==
Foddy had been drawn to difficult games while growing up. Living in Australia in the 1980s and 1990s, he was limited to what was brought into the country through imports. Many of these games lacked any type of save mechanism and sent players back to the start of the game if their character died, such as Jet Set Willy. Into the 1990s, video game developers in the United States and Japan began adding checkpoints or means to save. Foddy said, "The flavor of being sent back gradually disappeared up to the point now where it's this boutique thing. People of a certain age still have that taste, or maybe everyone has it, but it's been written out of the design orthodoxy." In 2018, Foddy stated that the main reason he put his name in the title of Getting Over It was due to a culture that does not generally "recognize the individuals who make games".

Getting Over It was aimed towards "a certain kind of person, to hurt them" and took inspiration from Sexy Hiking, a similar game released by Czech video game designer Jazzuo in 2002. Foddy learned of Sexy Hiking around 2007 from a post by Derek Yu on TIGSource. According to Foddy, the game was "somewhat of a meme among indie game developers", with Adam Saltsman having described Sexy Hiking as "the single worst game I have ever played". While dismissing Sexy Hiking at the time, Foddy found the game memorable, and later showed the game to students of his class on game design at New York University Tisch School of the Arts, whereupon he "realized how timeless the design" of Sexy Hiking was. Foddy stated that he is a fan of "messy, realtime physics puzzle games", and further expressed that they are "a huge area of inspiration in my own work". In a subsequently deleted tweet from 2014, Foddy asked his followers "would it be wrong if I made a sequel to Sexy Hiking? Given that I am not actually Jazzuo (as far as you know)".

Into the late 2010s, Foddy had seen a return of difficult games such as through the Dark Souls series. In August 2017, he observed that while there was outcry by players over the mechanism in Hellblade: Senua's Sacrifice, which reportedly erased the player's save file if they died, other players readily took to the challenge, showing renewed interest in games that were difficult by design. He said, "whenever you see something that disproves a strongly held design orthodoxy it's extremely exciting because it opens up new avenues for exploration", and considered Getting Over It as his exploration of this new development space.

== Reception ==
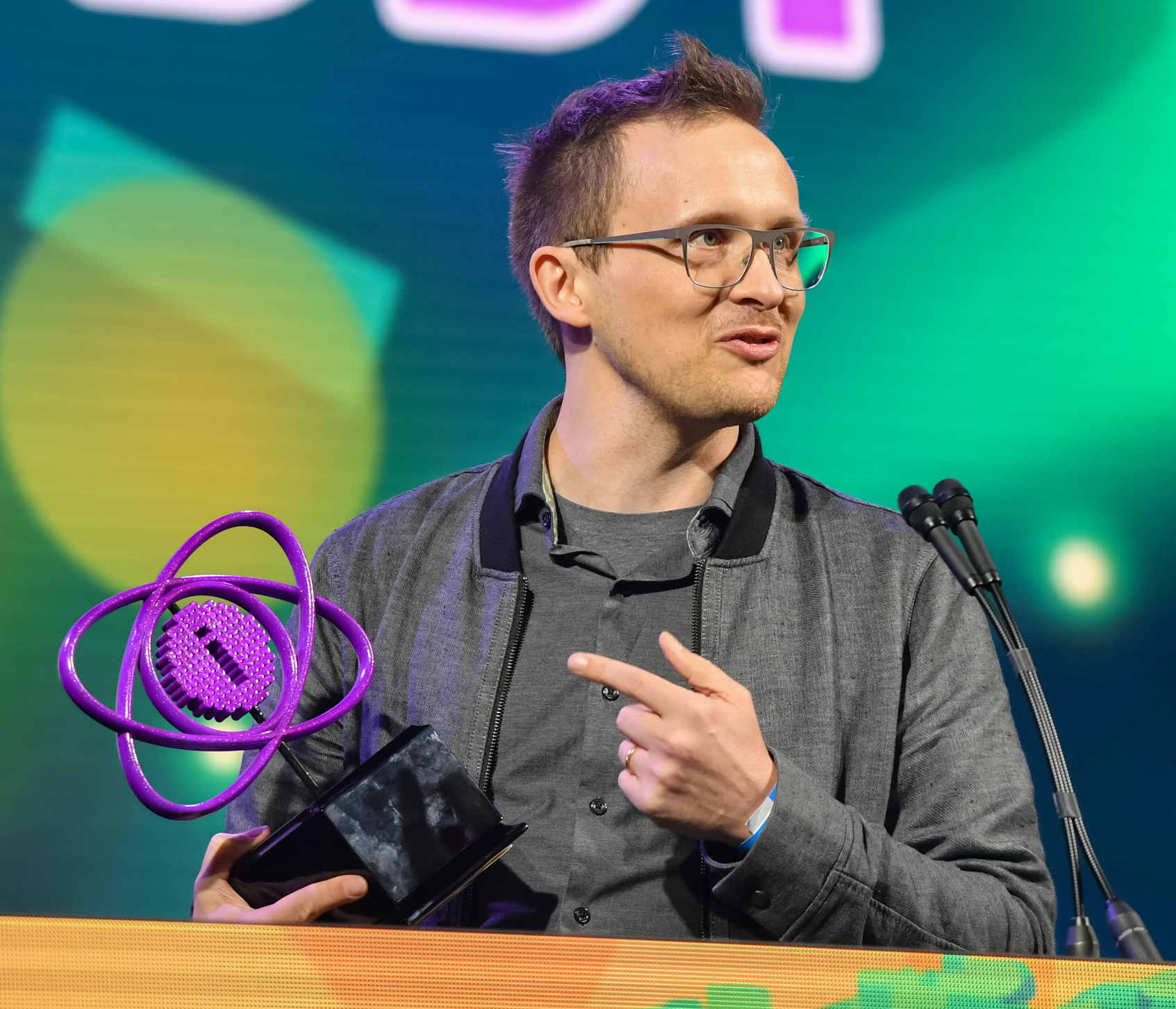
Foddy receiving the Nuovo Award for Getting Over It at the 2018 Independent Games Festival

Getting Over It's difficult gameplay was praised by reviewers, including PC Gamer writer Austin Wood. Rock, Paper, Shotgun listed it as one of the best PC games of 2017, and GameSpot said it might have been the "weirdest game" to come out of 2017. Polygon ranked it 36th on their list of the 50 best games of 2017.

Awards
Year	Award	Category	Result	Ref.
2018	SXSW Gaming Awards	Trending Game of the Year	Nominated	
2018	SXSW Gaming Awards	Mobile Game of the Year	Nominated	
2018	Independent Games Festival Competition Awards	Seumas McNally Grand Prize	Nominated	
2018	Independent Games Festival Competition Awards	Excellence in Design	Nominated	
2018	Independent Games Festival Competition Awards	Nuovo Award	Won	

== Legacy ==
Getting Over It's gameplay design has inspired many other games called Foddian games or "Rage games", such as Jump King, Only Up!, and A Difficult Game About Climbing, as well as community maps in other games such as the Deep Dip series in Trackmania. An Easter egg appears in the game Just Cause 4. At a point on the game map, the player can guide the protagonist to where a cauldron and hammer are located. Activating them puts the game into a side-view mode, challenging the player to move about scattered obstacles as in Getting Over It, with Foddy narrating about atop the folly of the exercise and meta-humor of the Easter egg. Diogenes was added as a playable character to the crossover fighting game Indie Pogo in May 2019. Diogenes also appears as an assist character in the crossover fighting game Fraymakers.
