= QWOP =

- Developer: Bennett Foddy
- Publisher: Bennett Foddy (Note: The Android version was published by Noodlecake Studios)
- Designer: Bennett Foddy
- Engine: Adobe Flash, HTML5
- Platforms: Browser, iOS, Android
- Release: Browser: November 2008; iOS: December 13, 2010; Android: July 4, 2013
- Genre: Sports
- Mode: Single-player

QWOP (/kwɒp/) is a 2008 ragdoll-based browser video game developed by Bennett Foddy. The player controls an athlete named "Qwop" using the Q, W, O, and P keys.

== Gameplay ==
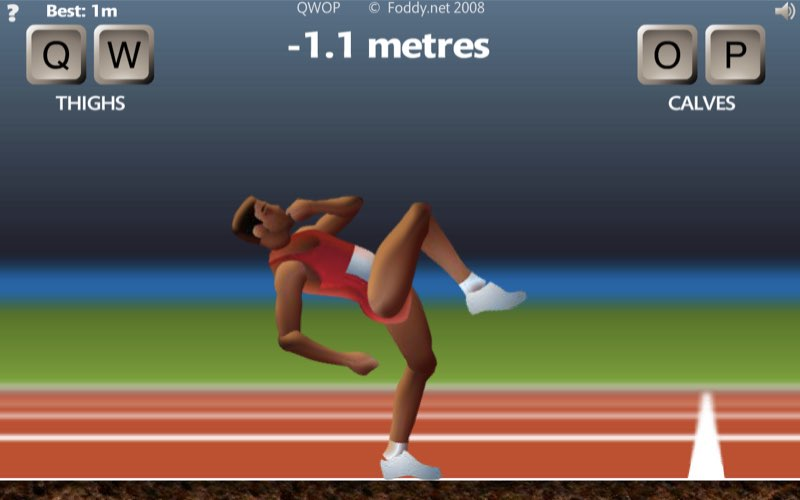
QWOP's title refers to the four keyboard keys used to move the muscles of the sprinter avatar.

QWOP is a ragdoll-based video game. The player assumes in a role of an athlete named "Qwop", who is participating in a 100-meter event at the Olympic Games. The player must control the movement of the athlete's legs to make the character move forward to reach the finish line, while trying to avoid falling over.

By using the Q, W, O and P keys on a keyboard, the player can command movement of the runner's thighs and calves, with each part of both limbs are being controled individually. They can also restart their current attempt by pressing the R key.

For the mobile versions the player controls QWOP's legs and arms by moving their thumbs around in the diamonds on the screen.

== Development and release ==
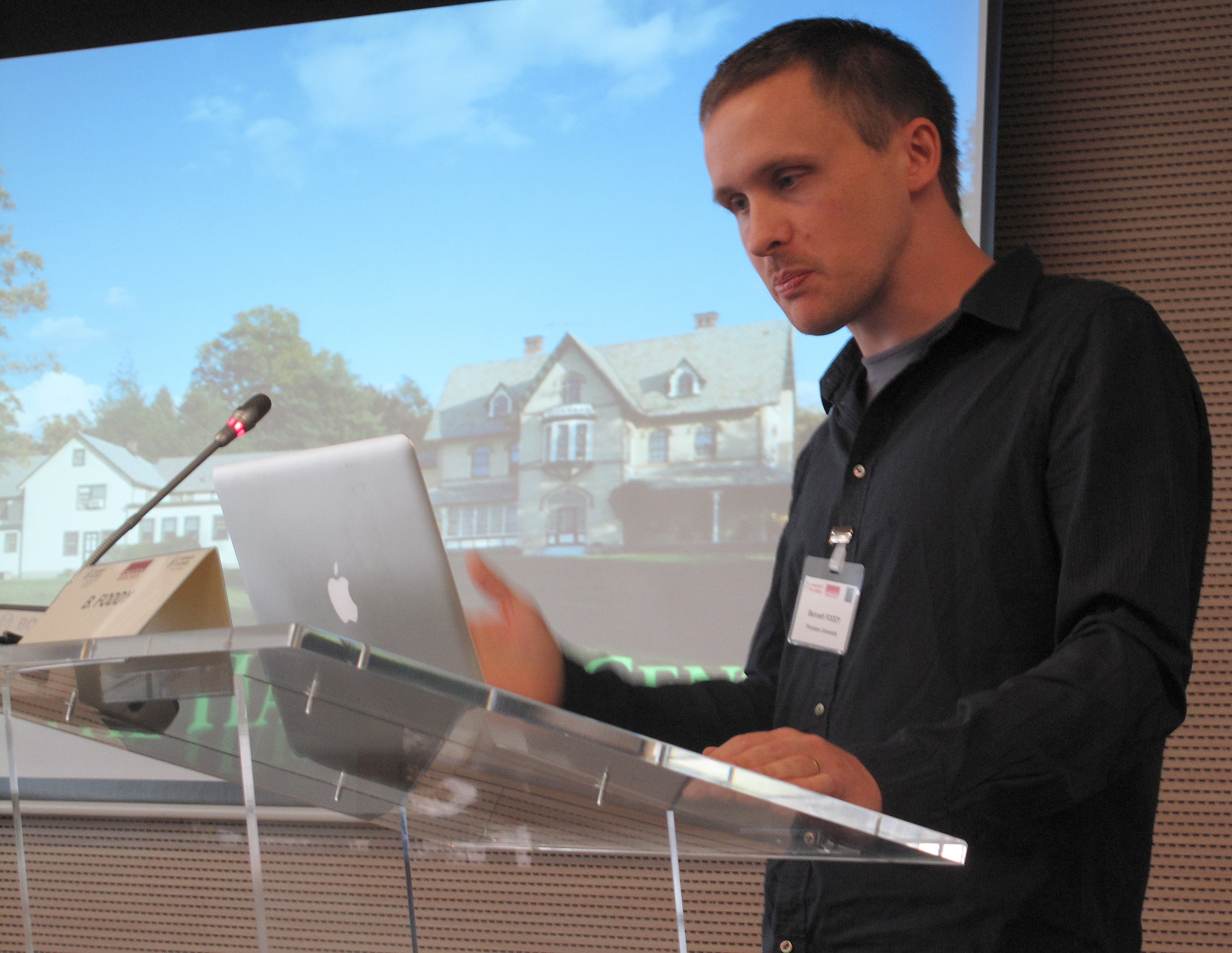
Bennett Foddy, QWOP's creator, at Fondation Brocher in October 2009

QWOP was created and developed by Bennett Foddy, who had played video games since he got his first computer (a ZX Spectrum 48K) at age 5. Years later, he served as a deputy director and senior research fellow of the Programme on the Ethics of the New Biosciences, The Oxford Martin School, part of the University of Oxford. He taught himself to make games while he was procrastinating from finishing his dissertation in philosophy. Foddy stated that "One of the things I found with QWOP is that people like to set their own goals in a game. Some people would feel like winners if they ran 5 meters, and others would feel like winners if they inched all the way along the track over the course of an hour. If I had put a social leaderboard or par system in, those people would probably have all quit out of frustration, leaving only the most determined or masochistic players behind."

The game was released in November 2008. The iOS was released in December 13, 2010. An Android version was announced in February 2013, and later released on July 4, 2013. That same year, this version was also added as a bundle for a limited-time promotion live sevice, "Humble Mobile Bundle 2" on October 9.

== Reception ==
Owen Good of Kotaku found the iOS version more difficult than the original game, multitouch and accelerometer controls. Michael McWhertor also from Kotaku, described that "QWOP may not be fun in the traditional sense. It's wacky. It's challenging. But one can make the argument that, as video games go, this is a clumsy control scheme. As QWOP, “the local sporting hero of a prosperous country in the Scandinavian Alps,” even crossing the finish line isn't easy. Taking control of QWOP's legs and his sense of balance might test your patience—or even better the patience of your friends when you hand them this thing." Justin McElroy included QWOP among "Best of the Rest: Justin's Picks of 2009".

The game helped Foddy's site (Foddy.net) reach 30 million hits, by August of 2011.

== Legacy ==
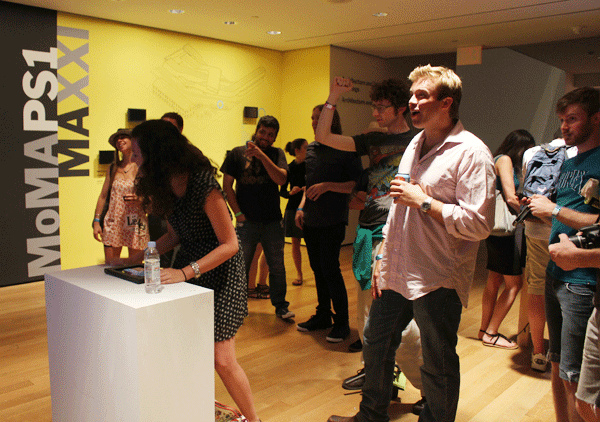
QWOP featured at the Museum of Modern Art in New York City in July 2011.

On July 27, 2011, QWOP was featured at the Museum of Modern Art in New York City and was part of an event called "Arcade" hosted by the video game art and culture company Kill Screen. The game helped Foddy's site (Foddy.net) reach 30 million hits. The Guinness World Records awarded Chintamani resident Roshan Ramachandra for doing the fastest 100m run on the game on April 10, 2013, doing it in 51 seconds. QWOP also appeared on the season 9 premiere of the American sitcom The Office.

=== Sequel ===
A sequel to QWOP named 2QWOP, was released in February 16, 2012, after being featured at an event in Austin named "The Foddy Winter Olympics" displaying a selection of Bennett Foddy's games, earlier that month. Serving as a 2-player multiplayer version of the original game, it features vertical splitscreen, automatically assigning one player's thighs and calves to the Q, W, E, and R keys, while the other player uses the U, I, O, and P keys.

=== Future games from Bennett Foddy ===
The game's creator, Bennett Foddy, would later develop Getting Over It with Bennett Foddy, released in 2017.

== See also ==
- GIRP – a sequel to QWOP
- CLOP – another sequel
- Getting Over It with Bennett Foddy – another of Foddy's games
