= Only Up! =

2023 video game

- Developer: SCKR Games
- Publisher: SCKR Games
- Engine: Unreal Engine 5
- Platform: Windows
- Release: May 24, 2023
- Genre: Platformer
- Mode: Single-player

Only Up! is a 2023 platformer game developed and published by SCKR Games. It was released on Steam on May 24, 2023, and permanently removed in September of that year following controversy over the use of copyrighted assets. Players control the character Jackie and must reach the moon through a series of obstacles consisting of real-life items.

Only Up! was praised for its difficulty but criticized for its graphics and level design. It was compared to difficult climbing games such as Getting Over It with Bennett Foddy. Only Up! became one of the most popular games on Twitch shortly after its release and was nominated for the first Vtuber Awards and The Streamer Awards.

== Gameplay ==
Only Up! begins with the character in a junkyard.

Only Up! begins in a junkyard where the player character, Jackie, must run, climb, jump, and vault through assorted objects and platforms. Around the map, there are beds the player can use as trampolines to skip portions of the obstacle course. The player must reach the top of the map to win and may slow down time to control Jackie's movements. There are no checkpoints, and the player cannot save their progress.

== Release ==
Only Up! was created by the solo developer SCKR Games and released via Steam on May 24, 2023. It was partly inspired by the folktale "Jack and the Beanstalk". On June 15, 2023, SCKR Games updated it to add camera controls like switching between first- and third-person perspectives and centering the camera. The update was criticized for removing "all the fun of watching streamers suffer".

=== Removal from Steam ===
Only Up! was removed from Steam on June 30, 2023, after numerous assets in it were found to be copyright violations. This notably included "Blanket in the Wind" by Aboulicious, a 3D model of a girl released under a non-commercial license. It also contained sound effects from Final Fantasy VII and Minecraft. SCKR Games consequently removed all copyrighted material and relaunched Only Up! on July 1. They also contacted Aboulicious for the creation of a replacement of their model.

On September 7, 2023, SCKR Games removed Only Up! from Steam permanently, citing stress. The solo developer said they needed "peace of mind and healing" and sought to move on from it. Additionally, SCKR Games announced Kith as their next game, saying it would be vastly different from Only Up!.

=== Promotions of non-fungible tokens ===
Blockchain games that buy and sell non-fungible tokens (NFTs) had been banned from Steam since October 2021. Only Up! placed images from the Goblintown NFT series on the player character's shirt and as one of the masks found in the starting area. The NFT series later sold clothing based on it. As Truth Labs had released Goblintown under a Creative Commons 0 license, which allows for commercial use, it is unknown whether SCKR Games had partnered with Truth Labs.

== Reception ==
=== Initial reception ===
Only Up! garnered popularity shortly after its release. By late June 2023, it was among the most popular games on Twitch, a video game livestreaming service, at 85,000 total viewers. Livestreamers and speedrunners shared themselves rage quitting after falling down and losing progress from the absence of a save system.

=== Critical reception ===
Many reviewers felt that Only Up!'s gameplay was stressful—which is what made it go viral—and that it was similar to the platform game Getting Over It with Bennett Foddy. Ayuo Kawase of Automaton Media praised the "high feeling of tension" players felt while in it. Writing for TechRadar, Elie Gould believed that Only Up! could give the player "a slight adrenaline boost" with the thought that they could lose their progress by making a simple mistake. Ben Lyons of Gamereactor noted the lack of checkpoints and wrote that players must figure out a way to navigate obstacles without falling. Dexerto's Rishabh Sabarwal summarized the "captivating" gameplay, writing that the player, when close to winning, could fall at any moment, thus losing significant progress.

Most critics felt that the graphics of Only Up! were poorly constructed. Christian Harrison of Try Hard Guides, Gould, and Lyons felt that the obstacles and overall design were not polished. Lyons and Sabarwal stated that the hidden Easter eggs in each section could surprise the player. Although Kawase wrote that Only Up! was "poorly optimized", Harrison noted that the graphics settings were set to their maximum. Harrison considered it a "rushed cash grab". Gould, Lyons, and Sabarwal expressed similar sentiments and felt that Only Up! was not unique.

=== Accolades ===
Year	Award	Category	Result	Ref.
2023	The Vtuber Awards	Stream Game of The Year	Nominated	
2023	The Streamer Awards	Stream Game of The Year	Nominated	

=== OnlyUp Fortnite ===
OnlyUp Fortnite is a custom Fortnite map created by a user known as ARMY. The adaptation shares most gameplay aspects with its predecessor while adding Fortnite references. With eight times the player count of the original Only Up!, the Fortnite version had over 100,000 players in early July 2023.
