= New York University Tisch School of the Arts =

Arts school of New York University

Tisch School of the Arts
- Type: Private
- Established: 1965; 61 years ago
- Parent institution: New York University
- Dean: Rubén Polendo
- Faculty: 265
- Undergraduates: 3,163
- Postgraduates: 939
- Location: Manhattan, New York City, New York, United States; 40°43′45.2″N 73°59′37.6″W
- Campus: Urban
- Website: tisch.nyu.edu

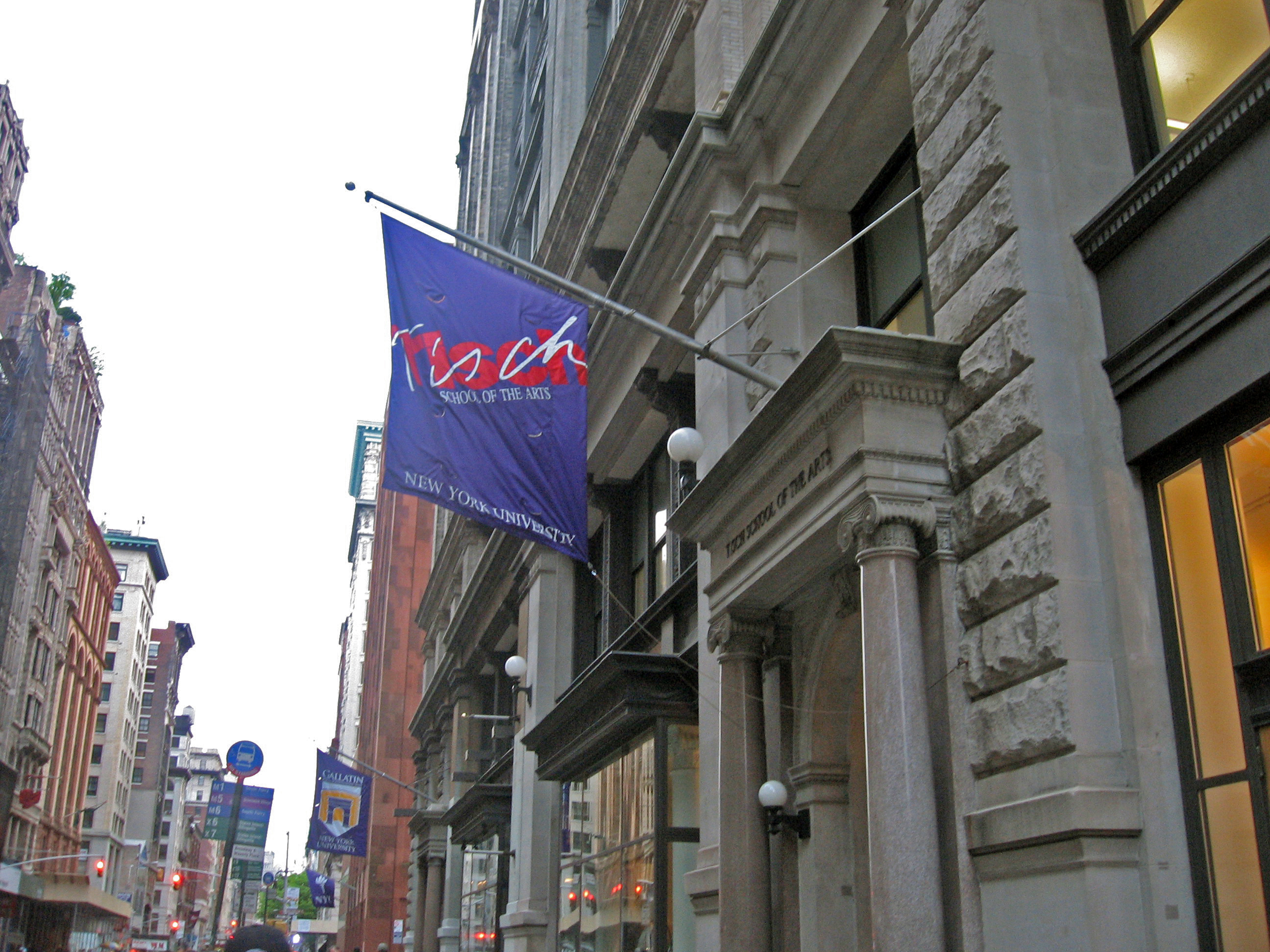
A Tisch School flag (with an older logo) displayed at the building's main entrance, c. 2007

The New York University Tisch School of the Arts (also known as NYU Tisch) is the performing, cinematic, and media arts school of New York University, a private research university in New York City, New York, United States. It was founded on August 17, 1965, as the School of the Arts at New York University, as a training ground for artists, scholars of the arts, and filmmakers. The school is divided into four institutes: the Institute of Performing Arts, the Institute of Emerging Media, the Maurice Kanbar Institute of Film & Television, and the Martin Scorsese Institute of Global Cinematic Arts.

The school also offers an inter-disciplinary "collaborative arts" program, high school programs, continuing education in the arts for the general public, as well as the Clive Davis Institute of Recorded Music, which teaches entrepreneurial strategies in the music recording industry. A dual MFA/MBA graduate program is also offered, allowing students to take coursework at both Tisch and NYU's Stern School of Business. It is located at 721 Broadway (the intersection of Broadway and Waverly Place), adjacent to the university's Department of Philosophy building and the Gallatin School of Individualized Study, in the Greenwich Village neighborhood of Lower Manhattan, New York City. In 2013, NYU opened a new technology hub on its Brooklyn campus called the Media and Games Network (MAGNET). Located at 2 MetroTech Center and, beginning in 2019, 370 Jay Street, MAGNET houses three Tisch programs: the Clive Davis Institute of Recorded Music, the Interactive Telecommunications/Interactive Media Arts programs (ITP & IMA), and the Game Center; these programs work in collaboration with departments in media technology from NYU's Tandon School of Engineering and Steinhardt School of Culture, Education, and Human Development.

As of 2019, 22 Academy Award winners, 17 Emmy Award winners, 12 Tony Award winners, and 4 Grammy Award winners have been affiliated with Tisch alumni and faculty. As of 2017, the school had more than 25,000 alumni working in the arts and related professions, and the school has more alumni in Broadway theatre than any other school for theater in the United States.

== History ==
The School of the Arts at New York University was founded on August 17, 1965, to provide conservatory training in theater and film in the context of a research university. The school created additional departments such as dance, theatre design, and cinema studies within a few years. Following the creation of the undergraduate Department of Drama in 1974, the school expanded to include the Interactive Telecommunications Program, Department of Dramatic Writing, Department of Performance Studies, Graduate Musical Theatre Writing Program, Department of Photography and Imaging, and The Department of Art and Public Policy.

In 1982, the school's second dean, David Oppenheim, solicited a donation from Laurence A. and Preston Robert Tisch that made possible the acquisition and renovation of the location at 721 Broadway where most of the school's programs are housed. In recognition of the generosity of the Tisch family, the school was renamed Tisch School of the Arts in 1982.

== Departments and programs ==
Tisch School of the Arts has three institutes and 16 programs and offers the Bachelor of Fine Arts (BFA), Bachelor of Arts (BA), Master of Fine Arts (MFA), Master of Arts (MA), Master of Professional Studies (MPS), and Doctor of Philosophy (PhD) degrees. Tisch also offers a selection of classes to NYU students not enrolled in any of its programs through the Open Arts curriculum.

The three institutes are:

- Institute of Performing Arts
- Maurice Kanbar Institute of Film & Television
- Institute of Emerging Media

The school offers an inter-disciplinary "collaborative arts" program, as well as the Clive Davis Institute of Recorded Music (founded by Arista Records founder Clive Davis), one of the few programs in the US to combine musical arts and business strategies in the recording industry. There is the Martin Scorsese Virtual Production Center, a result of the largest-ever gift to the Tisch School of the Arts, and which achieved LEED Platinum certification, the university's first such interior space designation. A dual MFA/MBA graduate program is offered, allowing students to take coursework at both Tisch and NYU's Stern School of Business. It offers high school programs (the "Tisch Summer High School Program" and "Spring Future Artists Programs") as an outgrowth of the undergraduate classes, and professional courses for the general public as part of a commitment to continuing education in the arts.

== Tisch School of the Arts, Asia ==
NYU's first branch campus abroad was the result of a partnership with Singapore Government agencies under Singapore's Global Schoolhouse program. Tisch Asia was also Singapore's first graduate arts school and offered Master of Fine Arts degrees in animation and digital arts, dramatic writing, film, and international media producing. Summer programs included professional workshops and non-credit certificate courses. The campus opened in fall 2007 on the former Ministry of Education & Republic Polytechnic grounds at 3 Kay Siang Road, Singapore, with the intention to enroll approximately 250 students.

The anticipated enrollment figures were not achieved, financial losses and embezzlement were alleged and Tisch Asia President Pari Sara Shirazi was dismissed from her post by NYU in November 2011. She subsequently lost a lawsuit claiming defamation and breach of contract. The Tisch Asia campus closed in 2014, with polarised recollections, ranging from positive endorsement, to allegations that it had been "an educational scam" in a failed lawsuit brought by three former students.

== COVID-19 ==
During the COVID-19 pandemic of 2020, which forced NYU to move academic instruction online, many Tisch students demanded a tuition refund, believing that virtual classes did not adequately meet their academic needs as a school for performing, cinematic, and media arts. In one of many pandemic-related emails, the school's dean sent students a video of herself dancing to R.E.M.'s "Losing My Religion", intended to raise community spirit. After hearing from students, the dean further clarified that individual schools have no control over tuition and that it was "challenging" for the university to give students their money back at the time.

== See also ==
- Glossary of motion picture terms
- Laurence Tisch
- List of NYU Tisch School of the Arts people
- List of New York University alumni
- New York University Tisch School of the Arts alumni
