= Iron Galaxy =

American video game developer

Iron Galaxy Studios, LLC
- Type: Private
- Industry: Video games
- Founded: August 13, 2008; 18 years ago
- Founder: Dave Lang
- Headquarters: Chicago, Illinois, U.S.
- Number of locations: 3 studios (2023)
- Area served: Worldwide
- Key people: Chelsea Blasko (CEO); Dave Lang (Founder)
- Products: Wreckateer; Divekick; Videoball
- Number of employees: over 200 (2021)
- Website: irongalaxystudios.com

Iron Galaxy Studios, LLC is an American video game developer studio based in Chicago, Illinois, with additional studios in Orlando, Florida, and Nashville, Tennessee. Iron Galaxy often collaborates with publishers and developers to provide "technical consulting", port games to different platforms, co-development, lead development, and support.

Iron Galaxy is most known for its lead development of Rumbleverse and Killer Instinct reboot Seasons 2 & 3, as well as its port work for PC and console games.

== History ==
=== First projects ===
Iron Galaxy was founded by Dave Lang in 2008 as a work-for-hire support and technical consulting studio. Lang had worked for Midway Games for several years before using his contacts at Capcom to get work porting games such as Bionic Commando and Dark Void.

Lang eventually was able to gain the trust of Capcom and Iron Galaxy developed Street Fighter III: 3rd Strike Online Edition, released in 2011. Capcom also hired Iron Galaxy to port Marvel vs Capcom Origins and DarkStalkers Resurrection.

=== Original games ===
In 2011, Microsoft approached Iron Galaxy to pitch an original game for the Kinect. The company developed a concept where the player uses motion controls to destroy castles, similar to Angry Birds. Iron Galaxy released Wreckateer, its first original property, in July 2012.

In 2013, Iron Galaxy worked with One True Game Studios to release the parody fighting game Divekick on PlayStation 3, Vita, and Windows. A second studio in Orlando was opened to assist with development. An updated version of the game, called Divekick: Addition Edition, released on PlayStation 4 and Xbox One.

=== Arkham games ===
Iron Galaxy worked on the Windows port of Batman: Arkham Origins. Upon release in 2013, the PC version suffered from numerous bugs and performance issues. After some initial fixes were released, Warner Bros. Games announced in February 2014 that it would not be addressing the game's remaining bugs and glitches.

In 2015, Iron Galaxy returned to work on the PC port for Batman: Arkham Knight. This version of the game was also plagued by serious performance issues. Just days after release, WB pulled the game from sale. Reports indicated that Warner Bros. knew of the game's issues prior to release. Rocksteady, developer of the console versions, worked to fix the PC port's issues. After four months, Arkham Knight was put back on sale in October.

=== Killer Instinct reboot ===
Iron Galaxy was initially in consideration to work on the 2013 reboot of Killer Instinct. According to Lang, it made it to the final round but was ultimately passed over due to its commitment on Wreckateer. However, following Amazon's purchase of Double Helix Games in 2014, Microsoft hired Iron Galaxy as the new ongoing developer for Killer Instinct.

Under Iron Galaxy, season 2 was released in October 2014 and season 3 in March 2016. A 10th anniversary update was also released in 2023 that added 4K support, updated balancing, and improved matchmaking.

In January 2015, Gearbox announced the Borderlands Handsome Collection, which brought Borderlands 2 and Borderlands: The Pre-Sequel to PlayStation 4 and Xbox One. Iron Galaxy was one of the developers that handled the port. Iron Galaxy also handled the PlayStation Vita port of Borderlands 2.

=== Move into publishing ===
In 2015, Iron Galaxy also expanded into publishing under its own label. It released Capsule Force in 2015 and Tim Roger's Videoball in 2016. This initiative ultimately failed and a third game, Gunsport, took several more years to complete.

=== Executive changes ===
In July 2016, Adam Boyes took over as CEO of Iron Galaxy, replacing co-founder Dave Lang who remained with the company to oversee prototypes and business development. The company had 130 employees at the time.

In June 2017, Iron Galaxy announced Extinction, its first full-priced game, published by Maximum Games. The game was released for PC, PlayStation 4, and Xbox One on April 10, 2018. Chelsea Blasko was promoted to Co-CEO in October 2020.

=== Nintendo Switch ports ===
Following the release of the Nintendo Switch, Iron Galaxy found a niche porting high-profile titles to the console. The studio worked with Bethesda to port The Elder Scrolls V: Skyrim in 2017. In 2018, it worked with Blizzard to release Diablo III on the Switch. The port took just nine months to develop and received positive reviews from critics.

After that, Iron Galaxy worked on the 2019 ports of Dauntless and Overwatch and the Apex Legends conversion in 2021. It was also one of the support studios that helped Retro Studios on the 2023 Metroid Prime Remastered.

=== Rumbleverse ===
In December 2021 the company unveiled Rumbleverse, with Epic Games attached to publish the wrestling-themed free-to-play battle royale game. Iron Galaxy pitched the game in 2017 and took three years to fully develop it. By this point, the company had 230 employees with 80 people working on Rumbleverse. However by January 2022, a month before its February release, the game was delayed indefinitely, though playtests continued.

It wasn't until July that the game received a new release date. Rumbleverse was released in August 2022, but failed to meet the necessary expectations to continue support. By January 2023, Iron Galaxy announced the game would shut down the following month—six months after launch. Those who paid for in-game currency or the Battle Pass would be eligible for a refund. A version for the Nintendo Switch was in the works at the time. Despite some initial excitement, the game ultimately suffered due to competition from similar games, limited multiplayer modes, exclusivity to the Epic Games Store, and a lack of interest from the streaming community. In the end, the game couldn't generate the revenue it needed to stay afloat.

=== Post-Rumbleverse ===
Despite the high-profile failure of Rumbleverse, Iron Galaxy avoided layoffs by reassigning developers and returning to work-for-hire clients, like Naughty Dog. It handled the PC port for the Uncharted: Legacy of Thieves collection in 2022. Iron Galaxy then worked on the 2023 PC port of The Last of Us Part 1. Initially expected to release on March 3, it was delayed three weeks until March 23. The game was released with many glitches and performance issues. Iron Galaxy also ported the sequel to PC The Last of Us Part II.

In 2022, Iron Galaxy opened a new studio in Nashville, Tennessee. By April 2024, it moved to a bigger space. Plans for a new studio in Austin were announced but later delayed following the Rumbleverse shutdown.

Boyes stepped down from his position as co-CEO in August 2024 and Blasko remained as the company's sole CEO. In February 2025, Iron Galaxy announced it would lay off 66 developers and support staff as a "means of last resort" for the company to stay afloat.

In March 2025, Iron Galaxy announced its next game, Tony Hawk's Pro Skater 3 + 4, a remake of the third and fourth games in the Tony Hawk's series which was released on July 11 of the same year.

Iron Galaxy worked on ports of Call of Duty: Black Ops and Black Ops II, which were both exclusive to PlayStation 4 and PlayStation 5. The ports were released on July 9, 2026.

== Games ==
=== Original works ===
Year	Title	Platform(s)	Ref.
2012	Wreckateer	Xbox 360	
2013	Divekick	Microsoft Windows, PlayStation 3	
2014	Divekick: Addition Edition	PlayStation 4, Xbox One	
2016	Killer Instinct Season Two	Microsoft Windows, Xbox One	
2016	Killer Instinct Season Three	Microsoft Windows, Xbox One	
2018	Extinction	Microsoft Windows, PlayStation 4, Xbox One	
2022	Rumbleverse	Microsoft Windows, PlayStation 4, PlayStation 5, Xbox One, Xbox Series X/S	
2025	Tony Hawk's Pro Skater 3 + 4	Microsoft Windows, PlayStation 4, PlayStation 5, Xbox One, Xbox Series X/S, Nintendo Switch, Nintendo Switch 2	

=== Published games ===
Year	Title	Platform(s)	Ref.
2015	Capsule Force	Microsoft Windows, PlayStation 4	
2016	Videoball	Microsoft Windows, PlayStation 4, Xbox One	

=== Port and support work ===
Year	Title	Platform(s)	Ref.
2009	Snood	iOS	
2009	Bionic Commando	Xbox 360	
2010	Kinect Adventures	Xbox 360	
2010	Dark Void	PlayStation 3, Xbox 360	
2010	Supreme Commander 2	Xbox 360	
2010	The Lord of the Rings Online	Microsoft Windows	
2010	BioShock 2	PlayStation 3	
2010	Tron: Evolution	PlayStation 3	
2010	Sleeping Dogs	PlayStation 3, Xbox 360	
2011	You Don't Know Jack	PlayStation 3, Wii, Xbox 360	
2011	BioShock 2: Minerva's Den	Microsoft Windows	
2011	Street Fighter III: 3rd Strike Online Edition	PlayStation 3, Xbox 360	
2011	Scribblenauts Remix	Android, iOS	
2011	Ms. Splosion Man	Windows Phone	
2011	The Lord of the Rings: War in the North	PlayStation 3	
2012	Back to the Future: The Game	Wii	
2012	Borderlands 2	PlayStation Vita	
2012	Marvel vs. Capcom Origins	PlayStation 3, Xbox 360	
2013	Darkstalkers Resurrection	PlayStation 3, Xbox 360	
2013	BioShock Infinite	PlayStation 3, Xbox 360	
2013	Dungeons & Dragons: Chronicles of Mystara	Microsoft Windows, PlayStation 3, Wii U, Xbox 360	
2013	Epic Citadel	Android	
2013	Batman: Arkham Asylum	Microsoft Windows	
2013	Batman: Arkham City	Microsoft Windows	
2013	Batman: Arkham Origins	Microsoft Windows, PlayStation 3, Xbox 360	
2013	Enslaved: Odyssey to the West	Microsoft Windows, PlayStation 3	
2013	Crimson Dragon	Xbox One	
2014	D4: Dark Dreams Don't Die	Xbox One	
2014	Destiny	PlayStation 3	
2014	The Elder Scrolls Online: Tamriel Unlimited	Xbox One, PlayStation 4	
2015	Borderlands: The Handsome Collection	Xbox One, PlayStation 4	
2015	Batman: Arkham Knight	Microsoft Windows	
2015	Deadpool	PlayStation 4, Xbox One	
2015	Destiny: The Taken King	Xbox 360	
2016	Lichdom: Battlemage	Xbox One	
2016	7 Days to Die	Xbox One, PlayStation 4	
2016	Dreadnought	Microsoft Windows, PlayStation 4	
2016	Alekhine's Gun	Xbox One	
2016	Dungeon Defenders II	Xbox One, PlayStation 4	
2017	Batman: Arkham Underworld	IOS, Android	
2017	The Elder Scrolls V: Skyrim	Nintendo Switch	
2017	The Elder Scrolls V: Skyrim VR	Microsoft Windows	
2017	Fallout 4 VR	Microsoft Windows	
2018	Conan Exiles	Xbox One	
2018	Fortnite	PlayStation 4, Xbox One, iOS	
2018	Quake Champions	Microsoft Windows	
2018	Crash Bandicoot N. Sane Trilogy	Microsoft Windows	
2018	Diablo III	Nintendo Switch	
2018	Fallout 76	Microsoft Windows, Xbox One, PlayStation 4	
2019	Spyro Reignited Trilogy	Microsoft Windows	
2019	Overwatch	Nintendo Switch	
2019	Dauntless	Nintendo Switch	
2021	Apex Legends	Nintendo Switch	
2022	Uncharted: Legacy of Thieves Collection	Microsoft Windows	
2022	Crash Bandicoot 4: It's About Time	Microsoft Windows	
2023	Metroid Prime Remastered	Nintendo Switch	
2023	The Last of Us Part I	Microsoft Windows	
2023	Tony Hawk's Pro Skater 1 + 2	Microsoft Windows	
2025	The Last of Us Part II Remastered	Microsoft Windows	
2026	Call of Duty: Black Ops	PlayStation 4, PlayStation 5	
2026	Call of Duty: Black Ops II	PlayStation 4, PlayStation 5	
