= Ziggurat (disambiguation) =

A ziggurat is a pyramidal structure that first appeared during ancient times in the Middle East. It may also refer to:

- A ziggurat algorithm, a number generating algorithm
- The Ziggurat, the Chet Holifield Federal Building in Laguna Niguel, California, U.S.
- The Ziggurat, an office building in West Sacramento, California, U.S.
- Ziggurats (album), a 2007 album by The Beautiful Girls
- Zigurat (company), a Spanish video game developer
- Ziggurat (2012 video game), a 2012 iOS video game by Action Button Entertainment
- Ziggurat (2014 video game), a 2014 video game by Milkstone Studios released on PC, Xbox One and PS4
- Ziggurat Pyramid, Dubai, a pyramid-shaped arcology conceived for Dubai
- Norfolk Terrace and Suffolk Terrace - halls of residence at the University of East Anglia
