= BGF =

BGF may refer to:

- Bangui M'Poko International Airport, Central African Republic (by IATA code)
- Banque de Gestion et de Financement, a bank in Bujumbura, Burundi
- Black Guerrilla Family, an American gang
- Bob's Game Forum, in video gaming
- Border Guard Forces of Myanmar
- Business Growth Fund, a British private equity firm
