= Fae Farm =

2023 video game

- Developer: Phoenix Labs (Note: Fae Farm has been operated by Gambit Digital since September 2025. Phoenix Labs was the original developer and publisher of the game.)
- Publishers: Phoenix Labs (until Sep 2025); Gambit Digital (from Sep 2025)
- Engine: Unreal Engine
- Platforms: Nintendo Switch; Windows; PlayStation 4; PlayStation 5; Xbox One; Xbox Series X/S
- Release: Nintendo Switch, Windows: WW: September 8, 2023; PS4, PS5, Xbox One, Series X/S: WW: October 22, 2024
- Genre: Farm life sim
- Modes: Single-player, multiplayer

Fae Farm is a 2023 farm life simulation video game originally developed and published by Phoenix Labs. The game begins after the player is shipwrecked on an island where they meet the town's mayor. The mayor then provides the player with a house and a farm. Players have various tasks in the game such as farming, combat, completing side quests and customizing their house similar to other farm sims such as Stardew Valley (2016).

It was released on September 8, 2023, for Windows and Nintendo Switch. It was later ported to PlayStation 4, PlayStation 5, Xbox One and Xbox Series X/S on October 22, 2024. Since September 2025, the game has been run by Gambit Digital after Phoenix Labs laid off most of their development team in January 2025.

The game received positive reviews from critics, who have described Fae Farm as a cozy game, but a couple have commented on the price of the Switch version. It was also nominated for Family Game of the Year at the 27th Annual D.I.C.E. Awards in 2024.

== Gameplay ==
Fae Farm (2023) allows players to grow crops similar to Stardew Valley (2016).

Fae Farm is a farm life simulation video game with role-playing elements. After being shipwrecked on an island, players are rescued by the mayor of a friendly farming community and given an unused farm. Farming and crafting are major aspects of the game. The island has four seasons with 28 days each. Players can grow crops, provided that they get watered regularly, similar to Stardew Valley (2016). The player can also craft items from a loom, food prep table or gem polisher.

Besides farming and crafting, players may explore the world, complete quests, engage in combat in dungeons and romance NPCs (non-playable characters). Personalizing their house using furniture they craft raises players' attributes, known as "cozy ratings", which increases the players' maximum health, energy and mana. Players have stamina that, when exploring, can be replenished with orbs found on the map. Combat can occur between enemies found in dungeons, but can similarly be avoided by drinking magic potions that turn characters invisible. Resources can be gathered through foraging, cutting down trees and extracting materials from dungeons. Crafting takes resources from the player's storage shed. The player progresses in the game after removing environmental hazards (such as whirlpools and thorns) by finding the source of the hazard. Characters do not die when exposed to extreme elements or suffering from other hazards; instead, they are safely returned to town and suffer no other penalties. Players can also unlock Wayshrines by obtaining certain crafted seals in order to quickly move between places. The game supports up to four players via online cooperative multiplayer or locally through the Nintendo Switch.

== Plot ==
The player discovers a message in a bottle that invites them to an island called Azoria. After encountering a whirlpool, the player is shipwrecked on the island where they meet Merritt, the mayor of a town located on the island. Merritt reveals that it was she who sent the message that the player found. She then provides the player with a house and a farm. They also meet a wizard named Alaric, who gifts them with a magical staff to help eliminate the thorns on the island, which appear from the beginning.

During their stay on the island, the player meets a mystical dragon-like sprite named Neppy, who created the whirlpools for fun. Upon learning that they are threatening humans out at sea, he helps the player stop the whirlpools in exchange for a meal. The player also meets the Wisp Mother, the island's guardian, who provides them with wings and opens the portal to the Fae Realm located in an alternate version of the island, where magical creatures live. Humans used to interact with those from the Fae Realm, but a dangerous mist called miasma has forced them to evacuate and the Wisp Mother sealed off passage to the realm to protect them. The miasma is discovered to have been caused by Boletal, a mushroom-like sprite, who enjoys making miasma but does not realize it is harming others. The player provides Boletal with a meal in exchange for his help in removing the miasma.

They later meet Grell, a frost sprite, and Flammo, a lava sprite. By providing them with meals, the sprites help the player stop a savage blizzard and a volcano eruption in return. It is soon discovered that the natural disasters occurred because the Wisp Mother left the island, which caused the island's magic to grow out of control due to the sprites being left unattended. Once the Fae Realm is fully restored, the humans and magical creatures reunite, and the Wisp Mother vows to be more responsible in the future.

== Development and release ==
Fae Farm was developed and published by Phoenix Labs, running on Unreal Engine. A demo was released as part of the Steam Next Fest in June 2023. Phoenix Labs later released Fae Farm for Windows and the Nintendo Switch on September 8, 2023, the studio's second title after Dauntless (2019). The first downloadable content (DLC), Coasts of Croakia, was released in December 2023, adding a new area to explore and creatures that can be befriended. A second DLC, Skies of Azoria was released in June 2024, featuring new content, such as quests, character customization and new wings. Both DLCs are free for owners of the Deluxe version (on PC) or the Switch version. The game was later ported to PlayStation 4 and PlayStation 5, as well as the Xbox One and Xbox Series X/S on October 22, 2024.

On August 12, 2025, it was announced that Phoenix Labs would no longer support online play from September 10, 2025, as well as ending future updates. This occurred after Phoenix Labs laid off most of its studio in January 2025 and shut down the servers for its other title, Dauntless, four months later. The game remains playable in single-player mode. Fae Farm has also been quietly delisted from the Epic Games Store. On September 15, 2025, five days after online play was no longer supported, Gambit Digital acquired the rights to Fae Farm and announced plans to continue game support, including reinstating online features.

== Reception ==
Reception

Aggregate scores
Aggregator	Score
Metacritic	PC: 75/100; Switch: 75/100
OpenCritic	59% recommended (Note: Based on 61 reviews)

Review scores
Publication	Score
GamesRadar+	4.5/5
Nintendo Life	8/10
Nintendo World Report	7/10
RPGamer	76/100
Shacknews	7/10
TouchArcade	4/5

Fae Farm received generally favorable reviews according to the review aggregator website Metacritic. Fellow review aggregator OpenCritic assessed that the game received strong approval, being recommended by 59% of critics. It is considered to be a cozy game by several critics, although some also criticised the game's $59.99 price tag. The game was nominated for Family Game of the Year at the 27th Annual D.I.C.E. Awards (2024).

Katie Wickens of GamesRadar+ called it "a low-stakes, inclusive, and supremely cozy farming sim". She praised the lack of grinding, but said it "maybe too chill for some". RPGSite's reviewer Scott White said that it is "one of my favorite relaxing games of the year". Sam-James Gordon of RPGFan said it "can flip-flop from feeling new, fresh, and polished to an Early Access title that needs some refining". In particular, he disliked the combat system, which felt to be too barebones, and said he encountered many bugs. He expressed hope that it would become "the next go-to game in the farming sim genre" after post-release updates. Ben Lyons of Gamereactor said that the game keeps the player mostly engaged, and also noted that it gets repetitive over time. They additionally noticed the similarity with the popular life simulation game Stardew Valley (2016). Siliconera noted that the game prioritizes "completing quests over farming and living a virtual life", unlike Stardew Valley and Story of Seasons. Although Kate Gray of Nintendo Life said the social dynamics were unimpressive and she felt a bit overwhelmed by the sheer number of things to do, she said it is a "gloriously thoughtful and beautiful farming game that's packed to the brim with details and charm". Joel DeWitte of Nintendo World Report has reported that despite the limited map space, it took him "a full fifty seconds to load from the title screen to the game" and finds it "all-in on a cute and playful tone". Nick Tan of Shacknews noted that "[players] can easily lose track of time, spending hours crafting items, petting animals, and spelunking in dungeons" and also stated that it is "more of a crafting game than a farming one".

While Shawn Musgrave of TouchArcade noted that the quality of life improvements make the premium game stand out and prevent wasting players' time, they commented on the fact it costs $59.99 to buy it on the Nintendo Switch, compared with $39.99 on PC. They noted that the game justifies the price tag, as it was in a "polished and content-packed state at launch", despite expecting it to be free to play. Another review from PocketTactics reviewer Holly Alice has also pointed out the game's "steep" price, and that it is steep even for Triple-A games like Pikmin 4 (2023).
