= Crimson Dragon =

- Developer: Grounding Inc. (Note: Co-developed with Land Ho Inc., support development from Iron Galaxy and Microsoft Game Studios Japan)
- Publisher: Microsoft Studios
- Director: Yukio Futatsugi
- Producers: Yutaka Noma; Toshiharu Tange
- Designer: Tomohiro Kondo
- Programmer: Hitoshi Nakanishi
- Artist: Ryoji Nakamura
- Writer: Tadashi Ihoroi
- Composers: Saori Kobayashi; Jeremy Garren
- Engine: Unreal Engine 3
- Platform: Xbox One
- Release: WW: 22 November 2013; JP: 4 September 2014
- Genre: Rail shooter
- Modes: Single-player; Multiplayer (Note: Added in Februery 2014)

Crimson Dragon (Note: Kurimuzon Doragon (Japanese: クリムゾンドラゴン)) is a rail shooter primarily developed by Grounding Inc. and published by Microsoft Studios as an Xbox One launch title. The game was published in 2013 in the West, with a Japanese release the following year. Set on the planet Draco, the story follows a dragon-riding soldier hunting the source of a disease that threatens Draco's human colony. The gameplay features the player moving an aiming reticle and shooting enemies while the dragon flies through 3D environments either on a fixed track or freely within arena-like zones. The dragon can be moved using either a standard gamepad or the console's Kinect peripheral.

Crimson Dragon was announced in 2010 for Xbox 360 under the title Project Draco, using Kinect-only controls. After changing platform, standard controls were added and elements of its graphics and music were changed. Several Panzer Dragoon staff worked on the game including director Yukio Futatsugi, designer Tomohiro Kondo, artist Manabu Kusunoki, and composer Saori Kobayashi. A spin-off tying into the narrative, Crimson Dragon: Side Story, was developed by Grounding and released in 2012 for Windows Phone. Upon release, Crimson Dragon received mixed reviews from critics. While praise was given to its core gameplay and art design, its graphical quality and progression systems saw frequent criticism.

== Gameplay ==
A level in Crimson Dragon, with the current dragon fighting enemies during an on-rails section

Crimson Dragon is a rail shooter in which players take on the role of a dragon rider, navigating through 26 levels across the planet Draco. Levels are divided into sections lasting a few minutes each, featuring both enemies and environmental hazards. Most levels take place on rails, mixed in with boss encounters in a large open area. Some missions offer alternate paths unlocked on repeat playthroughs. Missions have a main objective, and optional objectives such as completing a battle within a time limit or not taking damage. Clearing a stage rewards in-game currency and experience points, along with items collected during gameplay such as revival gems and food which can be used to raise the dragon between missions.

The player uses an aiming reticle to fire at enemies and incoming projectiles. The dragon has a lock-on attack for multiple enemies, as well as a more powerful attack that is aimed manually. Attacks are color coded green or red depending on their effectiveness against a selected target. The dragon can perform a dodge roll to quickly evade attacks, and change its position through standard movement. There are six dragon types with fixed elemental powers, statistics, and skills, as well as a selection of interchangeable secondary abilities. Each dragon type has a different evolved form which impacts their gameplay performance.

The dragon is controlled through a standard Xbox One gamepad, optionally incorporating the console's Kinect peripheral. The Kinect functions map body movements to dragon movement and attacking, and uses voice commands to alter its position or activate its special attack. The game includes asynchronous cooperative play through Xbox Live, allowing players to hire each others' dragons and share in the rewards from each mission. There are also online leaderboards where players can post their completion scores. Online multiplayer was added in an update, allowing up to two players to join in on missions. The game also incorporates microtransactions, with revival gems being purchasable with real-world money.

== Plot ==
Crimson Dragon takes place on Draco, a planet populated by dragons and human colonists; one century prior humans arrived on Draco from an overpopulated Earth, but have since lost contact and now fight a disease called Crimsonscale. The protagonist, a resident of the New Amara colony who can tame and ride dragons after surviving Crimsonscale, is drafted by New Amara's government into their Seeker defence forces. On orders from his superiors Sana and Cadmus, the protagonist pursues a dragon called White Phantom, who is spreading Crimsonscale through lesser dragons known as the White Reavers. During his missions, the protagonist discovers the original and prohibited Amara colony ruins, with Sana shielding him from government retribution and warning him to forget about it. In contrast, Cadmus sends the protagonist on missions surrounding the ruins, including finding an ancient body identified as a still-living Seeker.

Once the protagonist defeats White Phantom, they see a vision through a portal in Amara, revealing that Draco has become part of Earth's Crimsonscale experiments to discover immortality. With each failure of Crimsonscale to produce perfect immortality, Earth's government reset Draco using alien technology discovered on the planet to perform a multiverse transference that wipes out the original population. Before the reset happens again, the protagonist leaves behind a message to seek out Amara and the White Phantom in the hope that the cycle will be broken. A post-credit scene shows Cadmus, who found the message, asking the protagonist to help find Amara.

== Development ==
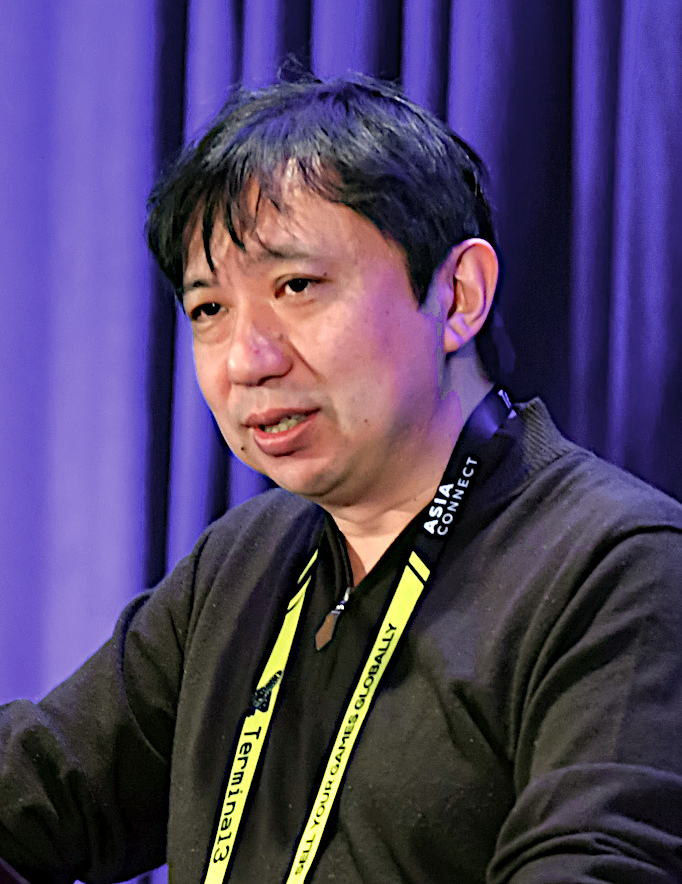
Director Yukio Futatsugi in 2019

Crimson Dragon was directed by Yukio Futatsugi, noted for his work on the Panzer Dragoon series and Phantom Dust. He conceived of the project when talking to Microsoft Studios about developing a small-scale game that would use the Kinect peripheral for the Xbox 360. Futatsugi had previously worked at Microsoft, which was struggling to break into the Japanese market with their Xbox console line. The proposal coincidentally came when his company Grounding Inc had spare development capacity to work on multiple projects.

Many Crimson Dragon staff members previously worked on the Panzer Dragoon series. These included Panzer Dragoon II Zwei director Tomohiro Kondo as lead designer, and lead programmer Hitoshi Nakanishi. Concept art was created by Manabu Kusunoki and Phantom Dust art lead Takehiko Yamamoto, the latter joining later in production. The lead artist was Ryoji Nakamura. Futatsugi acted as director, while Toshiharu Tange and Yutaka Noma co-produced the game. The scenario was written by Tadashi Ihoroi of Studio Monado.

The game was co-developed by Grounding Inc. and Land Ho Inc., with support from Iron Galaxy. Active production began in 2010 shortly before its announcement that year, with the original design only using Kinect controls. Following E3 2012, both in response to negative feedback around the Kinect-only controls and to bolster the launch line-up of the in-production Xbox One, Microsoft decided to shift the game onto the new console. The sudden change came as a shock to Futatsugi, but he was still overall happy to work on a system launch title. The porting process was difficult due to the team's small size.

=== Design ===
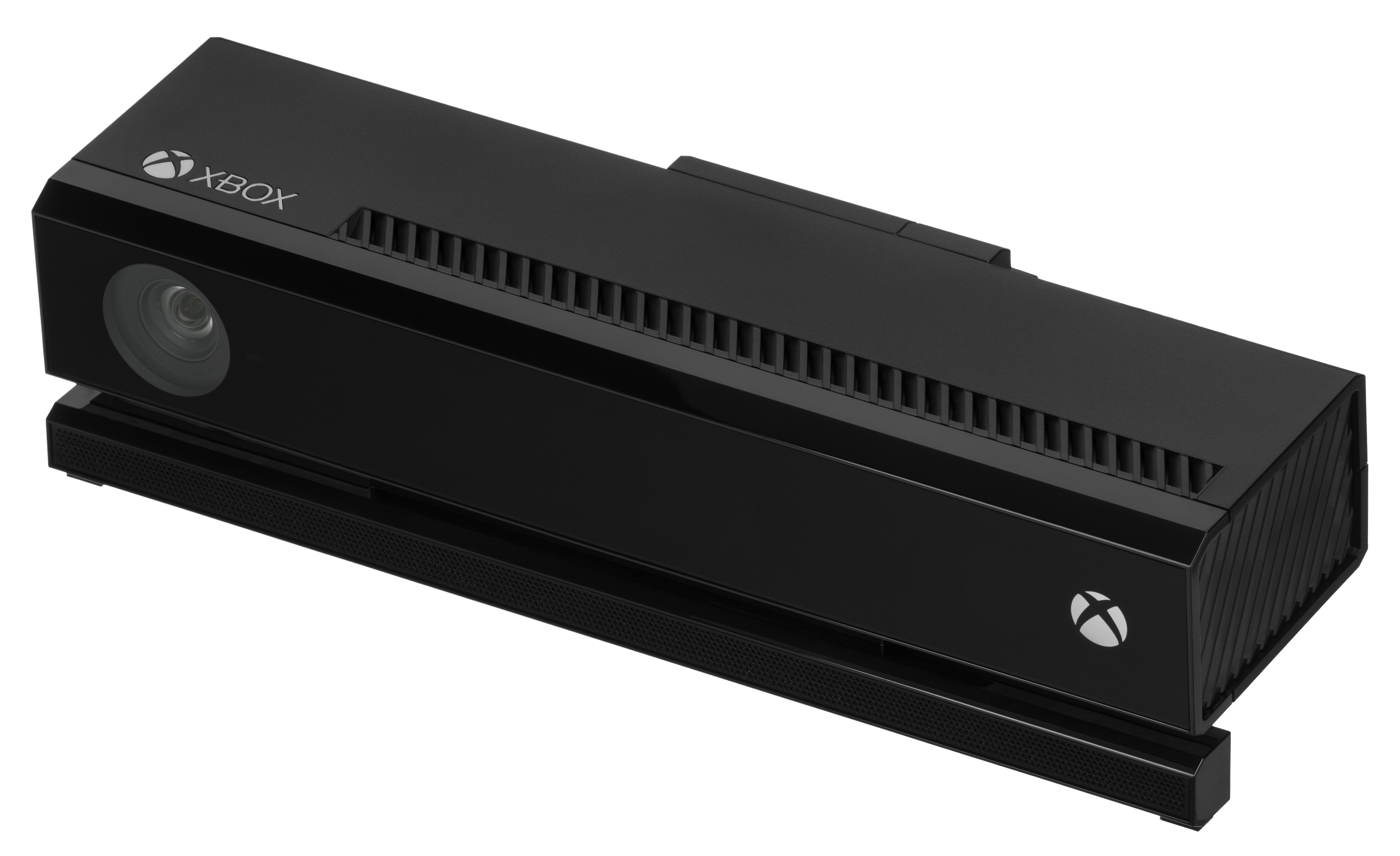
Crimson Dragon was designed with Kinect in mind, with the original design featuring no traditional controller support.

From its announcement through to its eventual release, the game was referred to by journalists as a spiritual successor to Panzer Dragoon. Futatsugi and Microsoft's Phil Spencer did not use the term, with Spencer saying there were no direct references, and Futatsugi explaining that the design premise worked best as a rail shooter similar to Panzer Dragoon. Like his other projects, Futatsugi's interest in new technology drove the design. Compared to other titles at the time, Futatsugi was using a fairly small budget, creating the game as a niche title without expecting major sales. Speaking about the intended audience, Tange requested a project that would appeal to both "core gamers" and a wider audience in contrast to Futatsugi's earlier work which was seen as very niche.

The team found it challenging to create a Kinect-driven rail shooter, as they wanted the game to be approachable for new players. The project became more challenging after shifting platforms due to balancing Kinect-based and gamepad-based control styles. Other changes stemming from the platform change were the additions of online elements, Kinect voice commands, and free flight missions. Just prior to release, based on feedback from play testers, the game balance was adjusted with increased experience rewards and lower prices for items, and adjustments to the difficulty.

Throughout development, the game used Unreal Engine 3, with the final levels using a mixture of old and new graphical assets. Futatsugi included dragons over other potential mounts because the concept was "an awesome thing that everyone would dream of". The dragons were designed to have an organic appearance, contrasting against the weapon-like creatures of Panzer Dragoon. The dragon breeding system was included based on fan requests. In both versions, the role-playing elements of dragon growth were added to mitigate the difficulty for players and deepen the gameplay. Due to an intended focus on multiplayer, the scenario did not focus on a single character.

=== Music ===
The music of Crimson Dragon was created by Panzer Dragoon composer Saori Kobayashi, with Jeremy Garren of Pyramind Studio arranging her score and adding tracks. Given full creative freedom by Futatsugi, Kobayashi made an effort not to mimic her Panzer Dragoon scores. Her score was written while the game was still intended for the 360. After the platform change, Garren was brought in by Microsoft to redo Kobayashi's score in an orchestral style. Garren described arranging and expanding the score as "a big blur", and was unable to consult Kobayashi about the changes. Speaking in 2017, Kobayashi felt that while the change was not "a bad thing in and of itself", it was unfortunate that the original score went unused. Speaking in 2017, Garren felt guilty about the amount of changes he made to the soundtrack, finding the choral elements overdone. Despite these changes, all of Kobayashi's music was retained. Woodwind solos were performed by Chris Bleth, percussion by Mark Yeend, Jillian Aversa performed the solo vocal work, and the New York Film Chorale performed the chorus parts.

A digital soundtrack album was released by Microsoft Studios's music label alongside the game on 22 November 2013. Kobayashi later stated that she would love to release her original soundtrack mixes if there was fan demand. She included remixes of two Crimson Dragon tracks in her intended musical style on Journey, an album of remixes created by Kobayashi and singer Yumiko Takahashi for their band Akane. The album was released on 29 September 2014 by Brave Wave Productions.

== Release ==
The game was revealed under its Project Draco title at the 2010 Tokyo Game Show, shortly after development began. Its final name was revealed in February 2012. Initially scheduled for release 13 June 2012 on the 360, the game was delayed indefinitely and an apology issued. The platform change was announced publicly at E3 2013. Crimson Dragon was a console launch title in all regions. It was first released in the West on 22 November 2013. An update was released in February 2014, adding online multiplayer and a new harder difficulty level. In Japan, the game released on 4 September 2014, with a unique dragon being offered for download for a month after release.

Depending on its reception, Futatsugi was willing to extend long-term support for the game through downloadable content with new dragons and gameplay features. Also dependant on the game's success, Futatsugi expressed a wish to create a role-playing video game sequel, which would feature a strong lead character and follow on from the ending of Crimson Dragon, which also acted as an introduction to the world and enemies.

=== Crimson Dragon: Side Story ===
A spin-off project for Windows Phone, Crimson Dragon: Side Story, was developed by Grounding Inc. and published by Microsoft Studios on 12 September 2012. It is a side-scrolling rail shooter with gameplay adapted to phone-based touch controls. Futatsugi acted as producer and director, Ihoroi as writer, Kusunoki as concept artist, Yasunari Hiroyama as lead designer, Hideaki Takamura as lead artist, and Mark Swan as lead programmer. Kobayashi created both the music and arrangements, expressing satisfaction with her work. Side Story was based on the concept of a shooter for Windows Phone that would promote on the 360 release, sharing characters with the main game. It was planned to release the two simultaneously, but Side Story ended up releasing first.

The narrative of Side Story follows Sana on a secret assignment from the New Amara government, where she uses a White Reaver to track the infection path of Crimsonscale carrier Dark Phantom. Her narration further details Crimsonscale's effects, granting a form of immortality to people at the cost of crippling deformity, with her father being one of its victims. Cadmus pursues Sana at one point, hinting at the cycle Draco is trapped in, and she discovers that the White Reavers are ancient humans converted into dragon-like carriers by Crimsonscale. After killing Dark Phantom, Sana vows to keep Crimsonscale from reaching Earth, while wondering if the infected humans are instinctively trying to reach home.

== Reception ==
Reception

Aggregate score
Aggregator	Score
Metacritic	55/100

Review scores
Publication	Score
Destructoid	8/10
Edge	5/10
Eurogamer	6/10
Famitsu	27/40
Game Informer	6/10
GameSpot	5/10
GamesRadar+	3.5/5
GameTrailers	6.2/10
IGN	5.9/10
Official Xbox Magazine (UK)	6/10
Polygon	4/10

Crimson Dragon met with "mixed or average" reception, with review aggregate website Metacritic giving it a score of 55 out of 100 based on 39 reviews. Futatsugi and Garren attributed the mixed reaction from players to its online elements, and use of microtransactions. Several gaming websites outside reviews criticized the use of microtransactions in Crimson Dragon, further noting increasing player backlash against their growing presence in gaming.

Destructoid's Chris Carter liked the gameplay and presentation overall, with his only complaints being occasional camera problems and the microtransactions. The four reviewers for Japanese magazine Famitsu enjoyed the gameplay, but several noted low-quality graphics and control issues, and one said the gameplay became monotonous due to a lack of variety. Martin Robinson of Eurogamer praised the art direction despite its technical quality, while criticizing the game as "a thin and troubled tribute to the original [Panzer Dragoon games], slim on the ambition, vision and art that made its predecessors what they were." Game Informer's Ben Reeves was also critical of the art and graphics, while also criticizing the music, controls, and shallow gameplay. Writing for the UK edition of Official Xbox Magazine, Jon Blyth praised the gameplay and art design, but faulted the game's microtransactions, RPG elements, and short length. Rob Slusser of GameTrailers enjoyed the Kinect implementation, but felt there was not enough content or polish for the game to gather more than a cult following.

Edge Magazine praised the game's easier levels, while criticizing the game's difficulty spikes as forcing a choice between repeat playthroughs or paying for microtransactions. GamesRadar's Ryan Taljonick praised the on-rails sections and graphic design, but faulted the free roaming controls and lack of mission variety. Jose Otero of IGN felt that the open levels created control issues compared to the rail shooter sections, while also criticizing the game's graphics and AI-companions. Peter Brown, writing for GameSpot, praised the later levels for their design and challenge, but highlighted the camera controls as off-putting alongside the high difficulty. Justin McElroy of Polygon expressed frustration with both the core gameplay and its secondary systems, concluding that Crimson Dragon "manages to take riding on a sweet flying dragon and make it a bland, frustrating slog."
