= Ziggurat (2012 video game) =

2012 video game

- Developer: Action Button Entertainment
- Publishers: Freshuu, Action Button Entertainment
- Platform: iOS
- Release: February 17, 2012
- Genre: Shooter
- Mode: Single-player

Ziggurat, stylized as ZiGGURAT, is a retro-style shooter video game developed by Action Button Entertainment for iOS platforms. As the world's last human fighting off incoming alien freaks from atop a ziggurat, the player uses touch controls to charge and shoot the enemies away, and dies if hit by an enemy. The game has 16-bit graphics style and an 8-bit chiptune soundtrack. Action Button designer Tim Rogers developed the game idea based on his experience with Angry Birds, which later led to his forming Action Button as a company with Ziggurat as its first release on February 17, 2012.

The game received "generally favorable" reviews, according to video game review score aggregator Metacritic. Reviewers praised Ziggurat's nuanced controls and minimalism. Time magazine picked the game as one of the best for the then new high-resolution third generation iPad.

== Gameplay ==
As the "Last Human on Earth", the player fights off approaching enemies with their laser rifle. The player-character, stationary atop a mountain peak (ziggurat) at the top of the world and end of time, attacks incoming mono-eyed alien freaks and dies upon the first hit from any enemy. The player earns a score based on their number of aliens killed before succumbing. The aliens vary in size and shape, from "blue freaks" who pogo like the Tektites from Zelda, to stealth yellow freaks, to shielded, aggressive red freaks, to bullet-sponge giant freaks.

The player charges their shot as enemies approach from both sides of the screen.

There are two shooting modes: Precision and Slingshot. In Precision, players control the shot by sliding their fingers along the bottom of the screen, (Note: Corresponding to the direction of the shot, the far left of the bottom of the screen shoots towards the bottom right and the middle of the bottom of the screen shoots directly above the character.) which calculates the arc and direction of the shot. In Slingshot, like Angry Birds, players draw back their shots like slingshots. The shot grows in power the longer the screen is held, and the shot is fired when the player lets go. Weak shots will also arc down with gravity, and strong shots will decrease in power if held too long. There are no power-ups, no gamified micropayments, and no pause function, but there are achievements such as living to see the end of the universe. It also integrates "pro-social" features like GameCenter and Twitter.

Ziggurat uses retro-style 16-bit graphics and an 8-bit chiptune soundtrack. The player-character is blonde and dressed in a red jumpsuit, and clouds pass by in parallax motion in the background. The sun's position in the distance appears as a function of game's duration. The chiptune soundtrack includes wailing solos, and its pitch appears to intensify with the game's difficulty. The player's death is accompanied by a "wince-inducing digital screech" or siren and a "blood-red screen".

== Development ==
Action Button Entertainment was founded by Tim Rogers. The studio consists of Rogers, Brent Porter, Michael Kerwin, and Nicholas Wasilewski, who have built all of the studio's four games from Ziggurat through Videoball. Their games are consistently simple in their aesthetics and controls. Rogers cited Angry Birds as the inspiration for Ziggurat. (Note: Ziggurat is stylized as ZiGGURAT.) He found the former "an incredible collision of game design concepts" that worked, though he wanted the game to be more of a "driving range" where he could throw birds at falling stuff, an idea which he refined into a Raiders of the Lost Ark-themed game of slowly hurling projectiles that push back bats in a corridor with no limit of projectiles. When riding the Bay Area Rapid Transit from Oakland to San Francisco a year later, Rogers watched a man play Angry Birds as he perfected a level, whereupon Rogers decided to make his game idea. He asked his friend and indie developer Adam Saltsman for advice, who confirmed and encouraged Rogers's interest in trying Flixel, the Adobe Flash tools used to make Saltsman's Canabalt. Upon deciding that he lacked the expertise, he tweeted to recruit others on the project and received some responses that later fell through.

Rogers continued to work as a video game design consultant and met Bob Pelloni (of Bob's Game) at the 2010 Game Developers Conference. The two worked on games (including Ziggurat) together. Rogers put out a call for artists on Twitter with a submissions request of "fan art of the Japanese box art of Phantasy Star II", and Action Button artist Brent Porter replied in under an hour with an entry Rogers called "incredible". In mid 2011, Rogers decided to work on an iPhone game for a few weeks as a break from a larger project. While Pelloni was against the buttonless iPhone as a platform, Rogers said the team was convinced by his design document. He contacted an Internet acquaintance who had previously mocked up a design idea from Rogers's Kotaku column, programmer Michael Kerwin, who came through in a week with a version without graphics or sound, which was later added. Rogers recorded "some insane and rough music" with his band, Large Prime Numbers, that Andrew Toups converted into an 8-bit soundtrack in the "original Nintendo sound format" that Rogers found "breathtaking". His friend, QWOP creator Bennett Foddy, deemed the game "sort of interesting".

Six months passed as Rogers worked on a social game before he chose to make a few more changes: more enemy types and progression, graphics in the background, and so emailed people to continue development. Rogers described his own critical list of video games (Note: His top 25 video games include Panzer Dragoon, Cave Story, Canabalt, with Out of This World at the top.) as having minimalist aesthetics with no overt story to tell other than through its game mechanics, and wanted the game to live up to those expectations. He fine-tuned the game with gut-driven decisions. For example, he applied a concept he called "sticky friction" from Super Mario Bros. 3 to the game's controls. One of the final features was the "scream sound effect" Rogers made with his guitar and "crushed" for a distorted and quasi-digital sound that he compared to those made by eccentric Japanese musicians whose records he owned.

Rogers explained that they did not add a pause option because he did not want non-game icons in the screen and because (like in Contra) players would die too soon after resuming. He saw the game as simultaneously a "snow globe of an electric toy" and a "gosh darn airtight hardcore video game" homage to the Super Nintendo Entertainment System and Sega Genesis, and called Ziggurat a descendant of his hobbies: Ibara: Black Label and the Rubik's Cube. Rogers added that the game contained nine hours of scripted events and that the Archenemy alien "is only the beginning". Rogers produced a trailer for the game. It was released for iOS platforms on February 17, 2012. Two months later, Freshuu, then the game's publisher, signed Ziggurat as the first client for Gimme, an in-game achievement to "real-life rewards" incentive program. The game received two spikes in sales following positive reviews from journalists, and from a mock infomercial's release on YouTube, all postrelease and not at the time of launch. Brandon Sheffield, writing for Game Developer, thought that Rogers handled the postrelease well since leaking details to the press before the game was available may have impacted sales. Action Button later became the game's publisher.

== Reception ==
Reception

Aggregate score
Aggregator	Score
Metacritic	83/100

Review scores
Publication	Score
Edge	9/10
Eurogamer	8/10
TouchArcade	4.5/5
Paste	9.0/10

The game received "generally favorable" reviews, according to video game review score aggregator Metacritic. It won a Destructoid Editors' Choice Award, and Time magazine picked the game as one of the best for the then new high-resolution third generation iPad.

Edge compared the game to a more pleasurable version of Halo: Reach's final scene. The magazine also compared the feeling of prioritization as a swarm of enemies appear to the feeling of clutter when stacking Tetris blocks haphazardly. Edge also called the red screen and sound effect that flashes upon the player's death "brash and lo-fi and unexpectedly poignant", for which they noted Rogers's interest in noise rock and credited the effect as "a beguiling personal signature". Alternatively, Paste's Joe Bernardi thought the sound did not accomplish what it intended. Joseph Leray of TouchArcade noticed how the guitar sound in Gears of War was reaffirming but the opposite in Ziggurat. Edge noted that nuances such as gravity's influence on the arc of uncharged shots make Ziggurat more of a basketball or golf-like sport skill than a "2D Halo". Edge awarded the game a 9 of 10, adding that it "prized immediacy" in a manner that matched the iOS platform.

Eurogamer's Martin Robinson said the game made him nostalgic for a score attack game from the early 90s that does not exist, and as such called Ziggurat "one of the finer simple score-attack shooters ... on the App Store" and an expression of the golden age of the Super Nintendo and Sega Genesis. He called the game's mechanics "fine-tuned" and the gun's abilities collated from the best elements of other video games. Danny Cowan of IndieGames.com likewise found the controls "very well suited" for touchscreens. He also praised the chained explosions and shot charging as "satisfying", and compared the game to Missile Command in its allure. Robinson of Eurogamer said the game's deserving peers were Geometry Wars and Robotron for their refined play styles that make players predict what enemies are about to act. TouchArcade's Leray praised the game design and never reached a place where his skills plateaued. He advised against using the Slingshot mode controls.

Joe Bernardi of Paste put Ziggurat in a lineage of iOS games where the player tries to do a fun thing as much as possible before dying, including Canabalt, Bit Pilot, and Super Crate Box. He connected Ziggurat's mechanics to Rogers's longstanding interest in "infinite mode" without external rewards, and praised the charge time mechanics as "excellent" and the perfect awkward length to confuse muscle memory. Leray of TouchArcade praised its attention to detail, especially in the character sprites. Paste's Bernardi called Action Button's design restraint "admirable" and lauded the game's balance. He noted its "extremely focused shallowness" as defining, like a Dorito, and called it "one of the best iOS games [he had] ever played". Reviewing for ActionButton.net, indie developer Adam Saltsman called Ziggurat "French New Wave action videogame fan art".
