= PictureBook Games: Pop-Up Pursuit =

2009 video game

- Developer(s): Grounding Inc.
- Publisher(s): Nintendo
- Platform(s): WiiWare
- Release: JP: March 26, 2009; PAL: October 23, 2009; NA: August 17, 2009
- Genre(s): Party
- Mode(s): Single-player, multiplayer

PictureBook Games: Pop-Up Pursuit (Asoberu Ehon Tobida Sugoroku! in Japan) is a 2009 party video game developed by Japanese studio Grounding Inc. and published by Nintendo for the Wii's WiiWare download service. It was released on March 26, 2009 in Japan for 1000 Nintendo Points, on August 17, 2009 in North America for 800 points and in the PAL regions on October 23, 2009, also for 800 points. A sequel, PictureBook Games: The Royal Bluff, was released in 2009 for the Nintendo DSi's DSiWare download service.

The game takes the form of a board game set inside a pop-up picture book. Gameplay bears similarities with Nintendo's Mario Party series. The game supports up to four players with optional computer-controlled players taking the place of spots not filled by human players.
