= Wreckateer =

2012 video game

- Developer: Iron Galaxy Studios
- Publisher: Microsoft Studios
- Engine: Unreal Engine 3
- Platform: Xbox 360
- Release: July 25, 2012
- Genre: Puzzle
- Modes: Single-player, multiplayer

Wreckateer is a puzzle video game developed by Iron Galaxy Studios and published by Microsoft Studios for the Xbox 360. Set in a fantasy medieval era, Wreckateer casts players as part of a demolition team tasked with destroying various structures. Players use the Kinect motion sensor to launch projectiles from a ballista and then guide them in-flight to their targets.

== Gameplay ==
In Wreckateer, the player is the newest employee of the Wreck & Tinker Destruction Company, which has been hired to demolish castles and other structures that have been infested by goblins. The player is armed with a ballista that launches various enchanted projectiles, and the object of the game is to destroy as much of the structure as possible using the provided projectiles. After the projectile is loaded, the player readies and aims the ballista by pulling away from the Kinect sensor, then launches the shot by spreading their arms.

Many shots can be nudged in-flight by swiping at them in the desired direction, while some have special abilities that can be activated when the player spreads their arms widely above their head. For example, a Bomb Shot will explode on command, a Split Shot will break into four smaller, linked projectiles, and a Flying Shot will sprout wings, allowing the player to fly the projectile into a target.

The level starts with a pre-set number of shots, and the level ends after the last shot has been fired. Points are scored for damage to structures, elimination of goblins and for collection of floating bonus icons. Players receive medals for reaching certain scores, and receipt of at least a bronze medal unlocks the next level.

== Development ==
The game was announced in 2012 with an announcement trailer. The game was more formally unveiled during Microsoft's press conference at the Electronic Entertainment Expo 2012. A spokesperson demonstrated the gameplay stage, complete with motion gestures.

The game was released as a part of the Xbox 360 Summer of Arcade series.

== Reception ==
Reception

Aggregate score
Aggregator	Score
Metacritic	67/100

Review scores
Publication	Score
Destructoid	9/10
Electronic Gaming Monthly	5/10
Eurogamer	7/10
Game Informer	7.5/10
GameRevolution	3.5/5
GameSpot	7/10
GameTrailers	5.5/10
GameZone	8.5/10
IGN	6.5/10
Official Xbox Magazine (US)	7.5/10
Polygon	6/10
The Guardian	3/5
Metro	6/10

Wreckateer received "average" reviews according to the review aggregation website Metacritic. Chris Watters of GameSpot lauded the game's "enjoyable score-chasing and good Kinect controls", while Mitch Dyer of IGN said the game "falls just short of 'irresistible addiction' and instead settles for 'amusing distraction'."

The Digital Fix gave it a score of six out of ten and said, "With no real story to speak of, and little variety in the levels besides the occasional addition of snow or a waterfall, this isn't the kind of game you'll play for hours. In fact, Wreckateer is highly reminiscent of a smartphone game, the kind of thing that is a lot of fun, but only in short bursts." The Guardian similarly gave it three stars out of five and said that "as good as it is, The Wreckateer [sic] won't win over anyone who isn't already convinced by Kinect. It looks like players may have to wait for the next generation of consoles before that's even possible. Metro also gave it six out of ten and said it was "the closest thing so far to a 3D Angry Birds game, but although the Kinect controls are fine it's the gameplay and visuals that need adjusting."
