= Action Button Entertainment =

American video game developer

Action Button Entertainment LLC
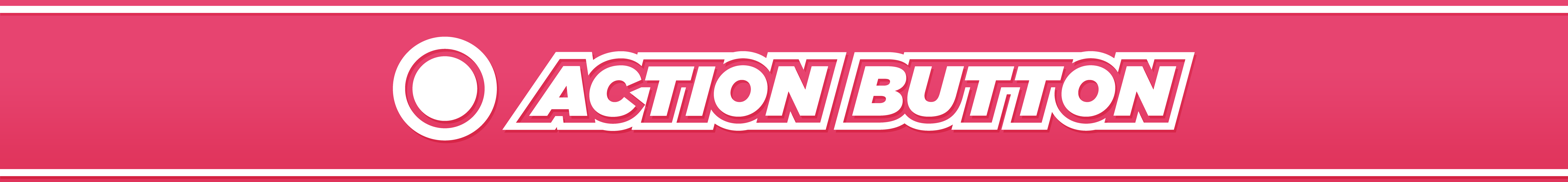
- Type: Private
- Industry: Video games
- Founded: September 1, 2010; 16 years ago
- Founder: Tim Rogers; Michael Kerwin
- Headquarters: Oakland, California, United States
- Area served: Worldwide
- Key people: Tim Rogers (director)
- Products: Ziggurat; Videoball
- Number of employees: 5 (2016)
- Website: actionbutton.com

Action Button Entertainment is an American video game development studio. The studio consists of Tim Rogers, Brent Porter, Michael Kerwin, and Nicholas Wasilewski and has produced five games: Ziggurat (2012), TNNS (2013), Ten by Eight (2013), Tuffy the Corgi (2014), and Videoball (2016). The group came together in 2010 as Rogers worked on Ziggurat. Porter joined Action Button after responding to a call for artists Rogers made via Twitter, and Kerwin joined based on a connection he had with Rogers from producing a mockup of a game concept Rogers outlined in his Kotaku column.

== History ==
Action Button Entertainment was founded by Tim Rogers. The studio consists of Tim Rogers, Brent Porter, Michael Kerwin, and Nicholas Wasilewski, who have built all of the studio's four games from Ziggurat through Videoball. Their games are consistently "simple" in their aesthetics and controls. The team formed during the development of Ziggurat, which began with an idea Rogers had while playing Angry Birds about pushing back a swarm of bats by shooting projectiles at them. He decided that he could not make the game alone. Rogers put out a call for artists on Twitter with a submissions request of "fan art of the Japanese box art of Phantasy Star II", and Action Button artist Brent Porter replied in under an hour with an entry Rogers called "incredible". In mid 2011, Rogers decided to work on an iPhone game for a few weeks as a break from a larger project. Rogers said the team was convinced by his design document—this game would become Ziggurat. Rogers contacted an Internet acquaintance who had previously mocked up a design idea from Rogers's Kotaku column, programmer Michael Kerwin, who came through with a rough draft within a week. Andrew Toups converted a soundtrack created by Rogers's rock band into an 8-bit soundtrack. After six months of hiatus, Rogers rekindled development and the team finished the Ziggurat, which was released in February 2012.

Rogers has said that he aspires for Action Button Entertainment to make games that share his preferred gaming styles and his hobbies. Realizing that the common link between his favorite video games (including Panzer Dragoon, Cave Story, Canabalt, and Out of This World) was minimalist aesthetics with no overt story to tell other than through game mechanics, Rogers wanted Ziggurat and future games to live up to those expectations and used his gut to fine-tune design decisions. The games also reflect aspects of Rogers's personality, such as in the "scream sound effect" on Ziggurat made and distorted from his guitar based on sounds made by eccentric Japanese musicians whose records he owned. He also called Ziggurat a descendant of his hobbies: Ibara: Black Label and the Rubik's Cube.

Rogers has continued to use the "Action Button" brand name for his YouTube channel, on which he publishes long-form games criticism video essays. Such as a six-hour video review of Tokimeki Memorial, which has been credited by games journalists with generating greater interest for the title in the West. In October 2022, The Guardian described Rogers' 2022 video review of Boku no Natsuyasumi as "a meditation on art’s capacity to give meaning to life," praising the narration and animation commissioned for the video.

== Games ==
=== Ziggurat ===
Ziggurat, stylized as ZiGGURAT, is a retro-style arcade shooter video game developed by Action Button Entertainment for iOS platforms. As the world's last human fighting off incoming aliens from atop a ziggurat, the player uses simple touch controls to charge and shoot the enemies away, and dies if hit by an enemy. The game has 16-bit graphics style and an 8-bit chiptune soundtrack. Action Button designer Tim Rogers developed the game idea based on his experience with Angry Birds, which later led to the formation of Action Button as a company with Ziggurat as its first release on February 17, 2012.

The game received "generally favorable" reviews, according to video game review score aggregator Metacritic. Reviewers praised Ziggurat's controls and minimalism. It won a Destructoid Editors' Choice Award, and Time magazine picked the game as one of the best for the then new high-resolution third generation iPad.

=== TNNS ===
TNNS, pronounced "tennis", is a brick-breaking action game released in November 2012 for iOS. As a universal app, it is playable on iPhones, iPads, and iPods. It was developed by Action Button Entertainment and produced by Rabbx. Players use a paddle along the screen's left side to bounce a ball towards breakable objects on the right side of the screen, and to avoid getting the ball in their goal. A star box ends the level. The game's over 500 stages are built as puzzles and played at random. Level features include wormholes that move the ball from one part of the screen to another and arrows that change the ball's trajectory. Power-ups include "multi-ball", which puts multiple balls into play. TNNS also includes objectives, a same-device two-player mode, in-app purchases, and Facebook and Twitter integration. Action Button later released an Android version.

The game Action Button described as "about keeping your eyes on balls" was inspired by tennis. It was released with little advanced notice in early November 2012. Danny Cowan of IndieGames.com compared it with Sidhe Interactive's Shatter and VG247 called it a rendition of Breakout. Pocket Gamer's Mark Brown likened it to both and further compared it with Alleyway, Arkanoid, and Super Hexagon with a "telekinetic power" to alter the ball's direction apart from the panel (as in Shatter). He found the game frustrating at times when unable to control the ball. Though Brown found TNNS fun, different, and addictive, it had "not quite won [him] over".

=== Ten by Eight ===
Ten by Eight, stylized as 10×8, is a puzzle video game by Action Button Entertainment where players match tiles. It was released on July 31, 2013, in North America for PlayStation Mobile—the PlayStation Vita and compatible devices. International editions followed. Players align similarly colored blocks and trace the path they create when aligned. The goal is to make the longest path possible, and bonus points are awarded for paths that connect the screen's edges. Star blocks act as power-ups that extend combos, such that a chain of green tiles can link to a chain of red tiles using a star block. Points can be spent on new character unlocks, including some from Ziggurat, that have no gameplay function. Ten by Eight has three modes of play. In endless mode, rocks around the grid block possible paths and can only be cleared by making paths that envelop the rocks. The game ends if a rock fully crosses the grid. The zen mode has no rocks or time limit. The timed mode sets a several-minute restriction on gameplay and has no rocks. Rogers produced an "infomercial-style trailer" for the game, which VG247 called one of his signature moves and that IndieGames.com called "glorious".

Paste's Garrett Martin rated the game 8.0 of 10. Though he acknowledged untimed "endless" modes as usually the best puzzle game mode, he found Ten by Eight's endless and zen modes "problematic", citing the difficulty and frustration in removing the endless mode's rocks and the dearth of urgency in the zen mode. Martin found the timed mode's length to be "perfect", but suggested that the Vita's screen was less so, recommending a tablet release. He compared the minimalist soundtrack to Kraftwerk, and noted that players uninterested in high scores would not stay interested for long.

=== Videoball ===
Videoball is a minimalist sports video game by Action Button Entertainment. Using solely one analog stick and one button, players control triangles that shoot projectiles to knock a circular ball into the opposing team's endzone. Holding the button creates a projectile (a "unit") that fires upon release. The projectile can propel the ball, nullify other projectiles, or incapacitate opponents. The projectile charges the longer the button is held, such that a charged "slam" shot can sail across the full screen. Games last an average of four minutes.

Videoball designer Tim Rogers describes the game as "an abstract minimalist electronic sport". Its development began as a dare from QWOP developer Bennett Foddy, Rogers's friend, to make a "one-button StarCraft". Rogers compared the game's design process to Gordon Ramsay's Kitchen Nightmares, where Ramsay convinces failing restaurants to provide fewer menu options and to make those dishes well. Polygon's Tracey Lien discussed their process as "chasing a certain purity" and mentioned the strong role of strategy in playing the game. Rogers noted basketball-like strategy in prototype games, with players positioned as center or forward positions or playing zone defense. He livestreams prerelease sessions of Videoball via Twitch. The game is expected for release in 2014 with cross-platform multiplayer and support for more than six simultaneous players.

Reviewers all cited Videoball's minimalism both in aesthetics and gameplay, and compared the game with the skill and strategy of football and basketball. Before its release, PC Gamer's Wes Fenlon wrote that he thought about Videoball daily after last playing two weeks prior due to its "addictive sort of fun" and his excitement for local multiplayer on PC following Hokra and TowerFall. He felt that the game's tagline of being appropriate for both a child's birthday party and prison was correct albeit silly. Fenlon praised the game's minimalist visuals, "peppy music, and chirpy sound effects". He compared the player's controls to that of Asteroids and contrasted its simplicity with the 100-hour onboarding process for League of Legends, having learned Videoball after "a couple minutes". Polygon's Tracey Lien compared the game's feel to basketball, football, and hockey. Citing the strong role of strategy in playing the game, she compared the array of projectiles fired to military strategy or a football play.

=== Tuffy the Corgi ===
Tuffy the Corgi and the Tower of Bones is a 2D platform adventure game for PlayStation Mobile where the player attempts to collect all 108 bones about a single, long level. As the player-character Tuffy is constantly running, the player can only jump and change direction by pressing any button on either side of the screen. When the player touches a spike or enemy, they must restart the game from the beginning. It features a counter that shows how many times the player has died. Rogers produced a video trailer for the game. The game was designed by Rogers, programmed by Kerwin, and illustrated by Porter. Ken "Coda" Snyder made the music. It was released in June 2014. Game Informer's Jeff Marchiafava wrote that the platformer was "hopelessly difficult", as it required a "level of perfectionism only speedrunners possess". He added that Tuffy was both what he "loved and hated" about the video games of his youth, between its 16-bit era art, tight platforming controls, "unforgiving" gameplay, and "reliance on rote memorization" of path through the level. Marchiafava added that gameplay trends had forgotten these types of games for a reason, and concluded that he "never warmed to Tuffy" despite his interest in "punishing retro platformers like Spelunky and Super Meat Boy".
