= PictureBook Games: The Royal Bluff =

2009 video game

- Developer: Grounding Inc.
- Publisher: Nintendo
- Platform: Nintendo DSi (DSiWare)
- Release: JP: September 16, 2009; PAL: November 12, 2009; NA: October 26, 2009
- Genre: Party
- Modes: Single-player, multiplayer

PictureBook Games: The Royal Bluff (Asoberu Ehon: Mind Ten in Japan) is a party video game developed by Japanese studio Grounding Inc and published by Nintendo for the Nintendo DSi's DSiWare download service. It is a sequel to PictureBook Games: Pop-Up Pursuit, which was similarly released as a downloadable title for the Wii's WiiWare service. PictureBook Games: The Royal Bluff was released on September 16, 2009, in Japan, on October 26, 2009, in North America and in the PAL regions on November 12, 2009, for 500 Nintendo Points points.

The game takes the form of a tabletop game for two to four players over one to five rounds. It can be played by multiple human players when they each have a Nintendo DS, DSi, 2DS, or 3DS. Only one copy of the game is required using DS Download Play. Multiplayer is also supported with multiple copies of the game. When there is only one human player, the CPU fills the place of other players. There is also a single player 1v1 Tournament Mode against CPU players of increasing difficulty.

Gameplay is involves playing cards to control the number of five different coloured chips in rows on the table. Each player has two secret colours (or goals) chosen for them at the start of the game. These determine each players score at the end of each round, based on the difference between the number of chips in play of each secret colour. The round ends when any of the rows reaches ten chips.

Bluffing plays a major part in the gameplay, as one gains additional points by successfully guessing another player's hidden colour, which is then revealed to all players. A loss of points occurs with an incorrect guess.

Trick Cards can also be used (except during DS Download Play). These have varying effects on play, including adding two chips to the colour with the shortest row, or removing two chips from the colour with the longest row. Only 2 different types of Trick Cards are available at the start of play, and an additional 8 types of card can be purchased by spending Medals which are won during games against the CPU.
