= Yukio Futatsugi =

Japanese video game developer (born 1970)

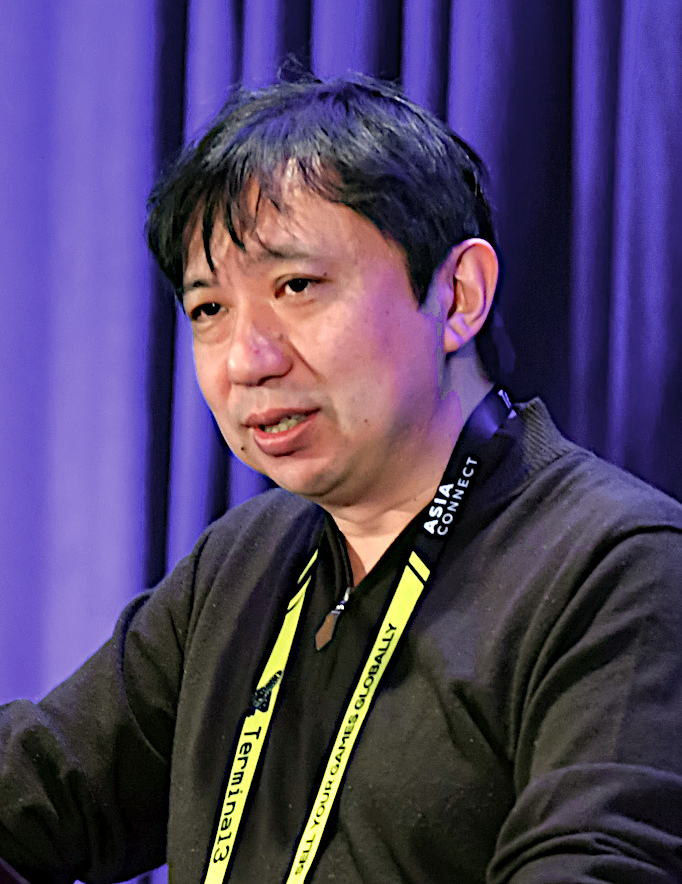
- Yukio Futatsugi presenting at the Game Developers Conference 2019
- Born: 1970 (age 55–56); Kobe, Japan
- Occupation: Video game developer
- Organization: Grounding Inc

Yukio Futatsugi (二木 幸生, Futatsugi Yukio; born 1970) is a Japanese video game developer. His work includes leading the teams which created Sega Saturn games Panzer Dragoon, Panzer Dragoon II Zwei, Panzer Dragoon Saga, and Xbox title Phantom Dust. He is the co-founder of video game development company Grounding Inc, developers of Crimson Dragon.

== Personal life ==
Futatsugi grew up in Kobe, Japan, where he attended high school. While spending a year in San Francisco at primary school age he fell in love with games such as Pong and Space Invaders, and later decided to pursue a career in video games over his other hobby, filmmaking. Of this choice Futatsugi said "I went with videogames, because I thought the world of games was about to become interesting." He attended the University of Tsukuba in Tokyo where he graduated with a degree in computer science.

== Career ==
"I want to create something with permanence; something that will remain in the hearts of the group of people I made the game for; something for those who are starving for a new experience; something that will stay fresh and unique ten years after its release; something that uses graphics and sound to leave a mark in the minds of players; something that doesn't look like any other game -- that's what I want to create."

— Yukio Futatsugi in 2005, while developing Phantom Dust.

In 1991, after finishing his degree, Futatsugi joined Sega. After two years of what he considered "menial tasks" he submitted a proposal for Panzer Dragoon which Sega accepted, placing him in charge of the project, aiming for release alongside the Sega Saturn in 1995. Futatsugi had originally been told he could either create a shooter or a racing game. When another Sega game, Gale Racer, was greenlit first, Futatsugi was forced to opt for a shooter. The game was originally imagined as having vehicles rather than dragons but Futatsugi said "Who doesn't want to try to ride on a dragon?... I wanted more of a softness to the game, and because of that I thought it was perfect." He was heavily influenced by Starblade when designing the game.

Following the success of the game Futatsugi's team went on to make two sequels, Panzer Dragoon II Zwei and Panzer Dragoon Saga, both for the Sega Saturn, which they developed simultaneously.

Futatsugi left Sega after the release of Panzer Dragoon Saga, moving to Konami for a year where he worked on Ring of Red, and then to Japan Studio where he made the Japan-only PlayStation 2 title Genshi No Kotoba. Futatsugi went on to work at Microsoft where he, for a short while, contributed to the development of Magatama before successfully pitching the idea for Phantom Dust which released for Xbox in 2004. Futatsugi was then made a Design Manager, overseeing some early games for the Xbox 360 and as head of the game unit which judged whether certain titles were suitable for release in Japan. In November 2013 Futatsugi said that he had ideas for a sequel to Phantom Dust, and would be open to developing the game if Microsoft wanted to make it. Futatsugi expressed interest in funding the game through Kickstarter, though geographical limitations on the platform stopped him from pursuing it.

=== Grounding Inc. ===
In 2007, Futatsugi co-founded the development company Grounding Inc. in Shibuya, Tokyo. The company's first games were released in 2009; WiiWare title Pop-Up Pursuit and DSiWare title The Royal Bluff. The company have released a number of games, including 2011's Sakura Samurai: Art of the Sword for the Nintendo 3DS and 2017's Beat Legion.

In 2010, Futatsugi announced that Grounding Inc. were working on Project Draco; an Xbox 360 game which would use the system's Kinect for release in 2011. The game was later renamed to Crimson Dragon, with some calling it a spiritual successor to Panzer Dragoon. Following some delays, including the cancellation of a finished version for the Xbox 360, the game was released for the Xbox One on 22 November 2013. Futatsugi said that he hoped the game would be successful enough that he could create an RPG sequel, and that he would like to make a Panzer Dragoon remake in high-definition.

Futatsugi has said that Grounding have a good relationship with both Nintendo and Microsoft as a result of their games and are interested in working on a mobile game and with Nintendo again. Looking back on his career, Futatsugi said "I used to want to do all sorts of things by myself, but I learned that it's better to draw on the talents of people around you and create something that equals more than the sum of its parts."

In 2018, Grounding Inc. announced their involvement in the development of Hidetaka Suehiro's The Good Life. Launched with a Kickstarter campaign, the game released on 15 October 2021. In September 2020, World's End Club, was released on Apple Arcade. The game was later released on the Nintendo Switch in May 2021.
