= Phoenix Labs =

Canadian video game developer

- Type: Private
- Industry: Video games
- Founded: April 2014; 12 years ago
- Founder: Jesse Houston; Sean Bender; Robin Mayne
- Headquarters: Vancouver, British Columbia, Canada
- Number of locations: 4 (as of 2021)
- Parent: Forte
- Subsidiaries: Bot School Inc.
- Website: phxlabs.ca

Phoenix Labs was a Canadian video game developer based in Vancouver, British Columbia. The company was founded in April 2014 by former Riot Games developers Jesse Houston, Sean Bender, and Robin Mayne. The studio's first project, Dauntless, launched in open beta on Microsoft Windows in May 2018 and has been released on PC, PlayStation 4, and Xbox One on May 21, 2019 and released on Nintendo Switch on December 10.

== History ==
Phoenix Labs was founded in 2014 by Jesse Houston, Sean Bender, and Robin Mayne, all former developers of Riot Games. The founders were joined by former Bioware, Riot Games, Capcom, and Blizzard Entertainment developers. The first 23 of the studio's employees had all shipped games with Houston previously.

In February 2018, Phoenix Labs opened its first US studio in San Mateo, California. In February 2018, Phoenix Labs received Series B funding from tech investors including Sapphire Ventures, GGV, Next Frontier, and MTGx, though they maintained independent control of the studio. Throughout Dauntless development and pre-release, the company encouraged back and forth conversations between developers and players. Game designers, directors, and executives all connect with players regularly through forums and social media. Since the game's beta release, the studio has continued to make changes based on player feedback and discussion. For example, Dauntless originally featured a paid loot boxes system called "Chroma Cores," which were removed after they received negative feedback from players.

In July 2018, Phoenix Labs announced that Dauntless had reached 2 million registered accounts. The studio raised another round of funding in October 2018, led by Sapphire Ventures, intended to help expand the live service operations of Dauntless. In December 2018 Phoenix Labs launched a season pass feature called Hunt Pass, a series of challenges that promise limited-time rewards while the season lasts.

The studio had originally promised a PlayStation 4 and Xbox One launch for Dauntless in April 2019, though this date was later pushed to summer 2019. The game officially launched on consoles on September 26, 2019.

Phoenix Labs acquired Bot School Inc. in August 2019 to help with Dauntless support and cross-play features. Phoenix Labs were acquired themselves by Garena in January 2020. The acquirement did not affect normal operation of Phoenix Labs or Dauntless, and served to bolster Garena's international presence. For Phoenix, the acquisition potentially allowed them to develop towards mobile game space.

On January 29, 2020, Garena announced the acquisition of Phoenix Labs for an estimated US$150 million. On December 2, 2020, Phoenix Labs announced it was opening two new offices in Los Angeles, California and Montreal, Quebec.

In February 2023, Phoenix Labs re-gained its independence through a management buyout. In May, the developer cut 9% of its workforce in order to focus on few releases. Studio CEO and co-founder Jesse Houston and COO Jeanne-Marie Owens stepped down in September. In December 2023, Phoenix Labs laid off 34 staff members across publishing, HR, IT, and shared services teams.

In May 2024, more than 100 employees were laid off and multiple projects were cancelled in order to focus on supporting Dauntless and Fae Farm. Reportedly, one such game was weeks away from being released in early access. It was also reported that Phoenix Labs had been acquired by blockchain company Forte "over a year ago" in an unannounced transaction.

Phoenix Labs announced in January 2025 that they were letting go of most of the rest of their development team "as part of unfortunate but necessary changes to [their] operations".

== Games developed ==
Year	Title	Genre(s)	Platform(s)
2019	Dauntless	Action role-playing	Microsoft Windows, Nintendo Switch, PlayStation 4, Xbox One
2023	Fae Farm	Farm life sim	Microsoft Windows, Nintendo Switch, PlayStation 4, PlayStation 5, Xbox One, Xbox Series X/S
