= Tim Rogers (writer) =

American video game journalist (born 1979)

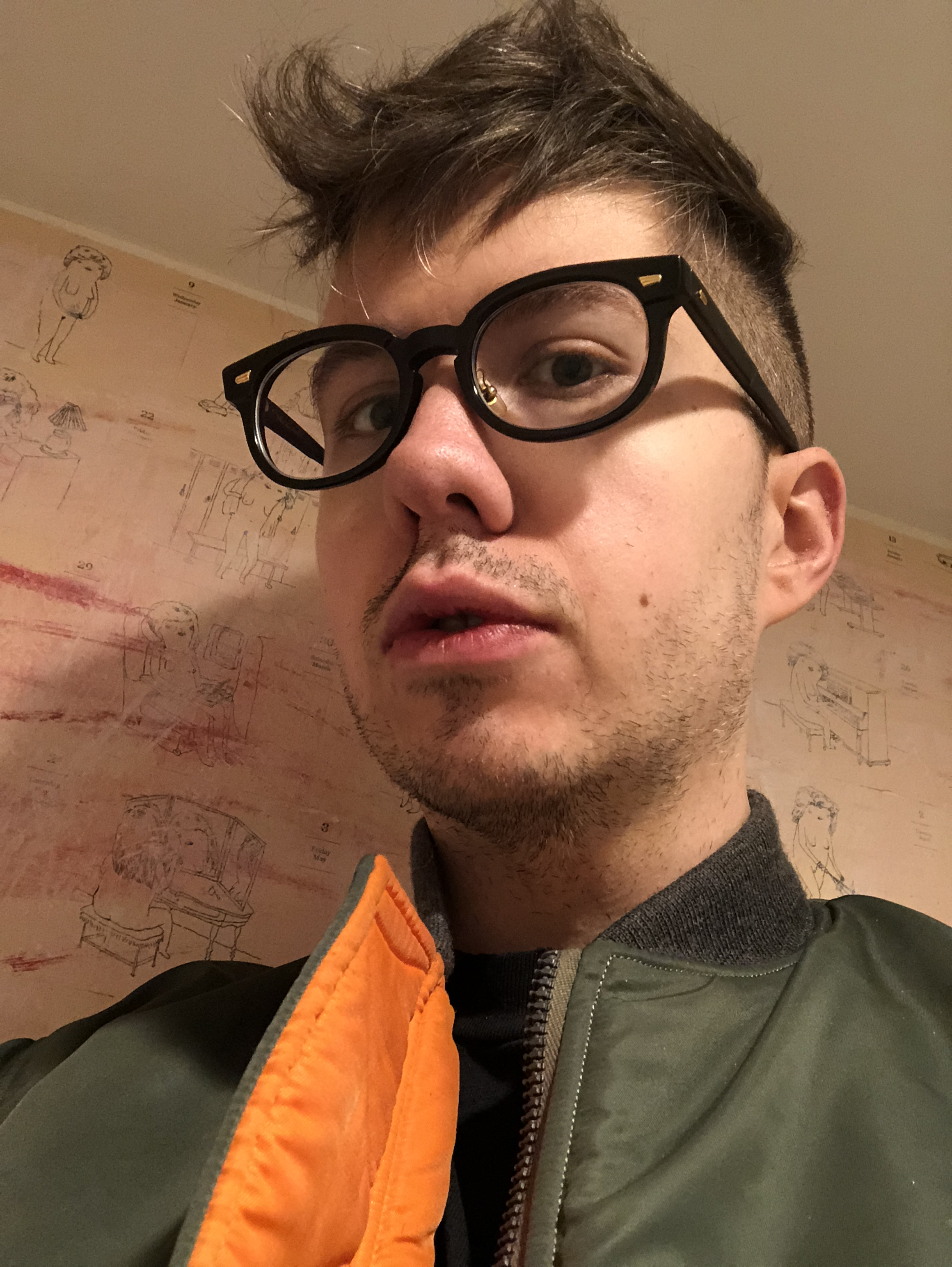
- Rogers in 2018
- Born: William Timothy Rogers Jr. June 7, 1979 (age 47); United States
- Other name: 108
- Education: Indiana University Bloomington
- Occupations: Video games journalist (formerly), developer, YouTuber
- Known for: New Games Journalism, Action Button Entertainment

YouTube information
- Channel: ActionButton
- Years active: 2020–present
- Subscribers: 169 thousand
- Views: 9.8 million
- Last updated: 15 February 2026

William Timothy Rogers Jr. (born June 7, 1979) is an American video game journalist, developer, and video essayist. His work is associated with mid-2000s New Games Journalism, a style of video game journalism that emphasizes the author's subjective and personal experiences in relation to the game world. The Guardian cited his 2005 opinion piece "Dreaming in an Empty Room: A Defense of Metal Gear Solid 2" as a core example of the genre. Rogers is additionally known for his hyper-articulate writing style and his video game reviews website ActionButton.com. He has also written for Next Generation, GamesTM, Play, Game Developer, and Kotaku. He later edited videos for Kotaku before resigning from the site and becoming an independent YouTuber.

Rogers co-founded Action Button Entertainment, where he designed games including Ziggurat and Videoball. The four-person studio specializes in simple aesthetics and controls, following from Rogers's own video game aesthetic and minimalist esports interests. He compared the studio's design philosophy to the spartan menu selections of Gordon Ramsay's Kitchen Nightmares.

== Video games journalism ==
Rogers is a video games journalist known for his verbosity. Danny Cowan of IndieGames.com described him as "infamous" in New Games Journalism, a style of subjective video game journalism in which authors emphasize their personal experiences in relation to the game world. The Guardian cited Rogers as one of the "unmissable examples of New Games Journalism" in 2005 for his Insert Credit piece on Metal Gear Solid 2, "Dreaming in an empty room: a defense of Metal Gear Solid 2". Gaming journalist Kieron Gillen called the article "highly discussed and fairly brilliant". Jim Rossignol of Rock, Paper, Shotgun recommended "Who Killed Videogames?", a new Rogers essay, as another standout work. Simon Carless, remarking on an 80,000-word Rogers essay, described the author as "the Lester Bangs of video games" for his "disruptive and iconoclastic" approach to games writing. As an originator of New Games Journalism, Carless wrote of Rogers, online communities were both fascinated with and dismissive of his work.

Rogers started ActionButton.net, a video games reviews website, in early 2007 as an outgrowth from Insert Credit and its forums, SelectButton. At the time of its launch, Simon Carless praised its "great writing" and signature "self-conscious metacommentary" style. GamesRadar called Tim Rogers "loquacious" and "a character" as profiled in Cara Ellison's "Embed With..." profile series, where they discussed "sticktion" as the role of "sticky friction" in Super Mario Bros. 3 and how it was used in Rogers' own Ziggurat and Videoball. Edge described Rogers as a "polarizing author of so much 'publish-now-edit-never' brain spew". In 2013, Rogers was selected to publish in the first round of digital books on games criticism published by Press Select. Rogers has also written for Insert Credit, Next Generation, GamesTM, Play, N-Revolution, Kotaku, Atomix, and Game Developer magazine. He later edited videos for Kotaku. As of June 2016, Rock, Paper, Shotgun reported ActionButton.net to be "dormant".

Rogers translated the 1997 PlayStation game Moon: Remix RPG Adventure into English for its 2020 re-release on the Nintendo Switch.

In February 2020, Rogers announced via Twitter that he was resigning from his position at Kotaku. He currently creates long-form video reviews under his Action Button channel as an independent YouTuber, such as a six-hour video review of Tokimeki Memorial, which has been credited by games journalists with generating greater interest for the title in the West. In October 2022, The Guardian described Rogers' 2022 video review of Boku no Natsuyasumi as "a meditation on art’s capacity to give meaning to life," praising the narration and animation commissioned for the video.

== Action Button Entertainment ==
Rogers is a co-founder of Action Button Entertainment, a four-person studio that consists of Rogers, Brent Porter, Michael Kerwin, and Nicholas Wasilewski, who together have built all of the studio's four games from Ziggurat through Videoball. Their games are consistently simple in their aesthetics and controls, following from Rogers's own video game aesthetic interests. His interest in minimalist esports and simple games parlays into his design philosophy, which he compared to Gordon Ramsay's Kitchen Nightmares, a show in which Ramsay advises failing restaurants to improve by trimming their menus to a spartan few great dishes. Rogers also felt simple games were "less work".

Rogers has said that he aspires for Action Button Entertainment to make games that share his preferred gaming styles and his hobbies. In finding that the common link between his top 25 video games (including Panzer Dragoon, Cave Story, Canabalt, and his favorite, Out of This World) was minimalist aesthetics with no overt story to tell other than through game mechanics, Rogers wanted Ziggurat and future games to live up to those expectations and used his gut to fine-tune design decisions. The games also reflect aspects of Rogers's personality, such as in the "scream sound effect" on Ziggurat made and distorted from his guitar and based on sounds made by eccentric Japanese musicians whose records he owned. He also called Ziggurat a descendant of his hobbies: the video game Ibara: Black Label and the Rubik's Cube. Rogers also became known for producing promotional "infomercial-style trailers".

=== Ziggurat ===
Ziggurat is a retro-style arcade shooter video game where the player fights off incoming aliens as the world's last human from atop a ziggurat. The player uses simple touch controls to charge and shoot the enemies away, and dies if hit by an enemy. The game has 16-bit graphics style and an 8-bit chiptune soundtrack.

Rogers co-founded Action Button Entertainment while working on Ziggurat, which began with an idea Rogers had while playing Angry Birds about pushing back a swarm of bats by shooting projectiles at them. He decided that he could not make the game alone. Rogers put out a call for artists on Twitter with a submissions request of "fan art of the Japanese box art of Phantasy Star II", and Action Button artist Brent Porter replied in under an hour with an entry Rogers called "incredible". In mid 2011, Rogers decided to work on an iPhone game for a few weeks as a break from a larger project. Rogers said the team was convinced by his design document—this game would become Ziggurat. Rogers contacted an Internet acquaintance who had previously mocked up a design idea from Rogers's Kotaku column, programmer Michael Kerwin, who came through with a rough draft within a week. Andrew Toups converted a soundtrack created by Rogers's rock band into an 8-bit soundtrack. After six months of hiatus and working at a social games company, Rogers rekindled development and the team finished the Ziggurat, which was released in February 2012 for iOS platforms.

Edge related the "unexpectedly poignant" red screen and sound effect that flashes upon the player's death to Rogers's personal interest in noise rock. They called it a "beguiling personal signature".

=== TNNS ===
TNNS, pronounced "tennis", is a brick-breaking action game where players use a paddle along the screen's left side to bounce a ball towards breakable objects on the right side of the screen, and to avoid getting the ball in their goal. It was released with little advanced notice in November 2012 for iOS as a universal app playable on iPhones, iPads, and iPods. Danny Cowan of IndieGames.com compared it with Sidhe Interactive's Shatter and VG247 called it a rendition of Breakout. Pocket Gamer likened it to both and further compared it with Alleyway, Arkanoid, and Super Hexagon with a "telekinetic power" to alter the ball's direction apart from the panel (as in Shatter).

=== 10×8 ===
Ten by Eight, stylized as 10×8, is a puzzle video game where players match tiles. Players align similarly colored blocks and trace the path they create when aligned. Star blocks act as power-ups that extend combos. Rogers produced an "infomercial-style trailer" for the game, which VG247 called one of his signature moves and that IndieGames.com called "glorious". It was released on July 31, 2013, in North America for PlayStation Mobile—the PlayStation Vita and compatible devices. Around the same time, Rogers presented at the GDC 2013 Indie Soapbox, where he told the story of how he "went indie".

=== Videoball ===
In Videoball, players use solely one analog stick and one button to control triangles that shoot projectiles to knock a circular ball into the opposing team's endzone. The triangle shoots a projectile, which charges the longer the button is held, such that a charged "slam" shot can sail across the full screen. Rogers, the game's designer, describes the game as "an abstract minimalist electronic sport". Its development began as a dare from QWOP developer Bennett Foddy, Rogers's friend, to make a "one-button StarCraft". Rogers compared the game's design process to Gordon Ramsay's Kitchen Nightmares, where Ramsay convinces failing restaurants to provide fewer menu options and to make those dishes well. Rogers acknowledged the role of noted basketball-like strategy in its playtests, and the difficulty in crafting a minimalist game with a high importance on nuanced detail. He livestreamed prerelease sessions of Videoball via Twitch and broadcast gameplay from Twitch's booth at PAX East 2014 with indie publisher Midnight City. The game released in 2016.

== Personal life ==
"Gentlemen, Start Your Clown Shoes" by Rogers's rock band, Large Prime Numbers

William Timothy Rogers Jr. was born on June 7, 1979. He graduated from Indiana University Bloomington in 2001 with a degree in East Asian languages and cultures. He is a guitarist in his rock band, Large Prime Numbers. He is in a relationship with video game developer Jenny Jiao Hsia.
