= Videoball =

2016 video game

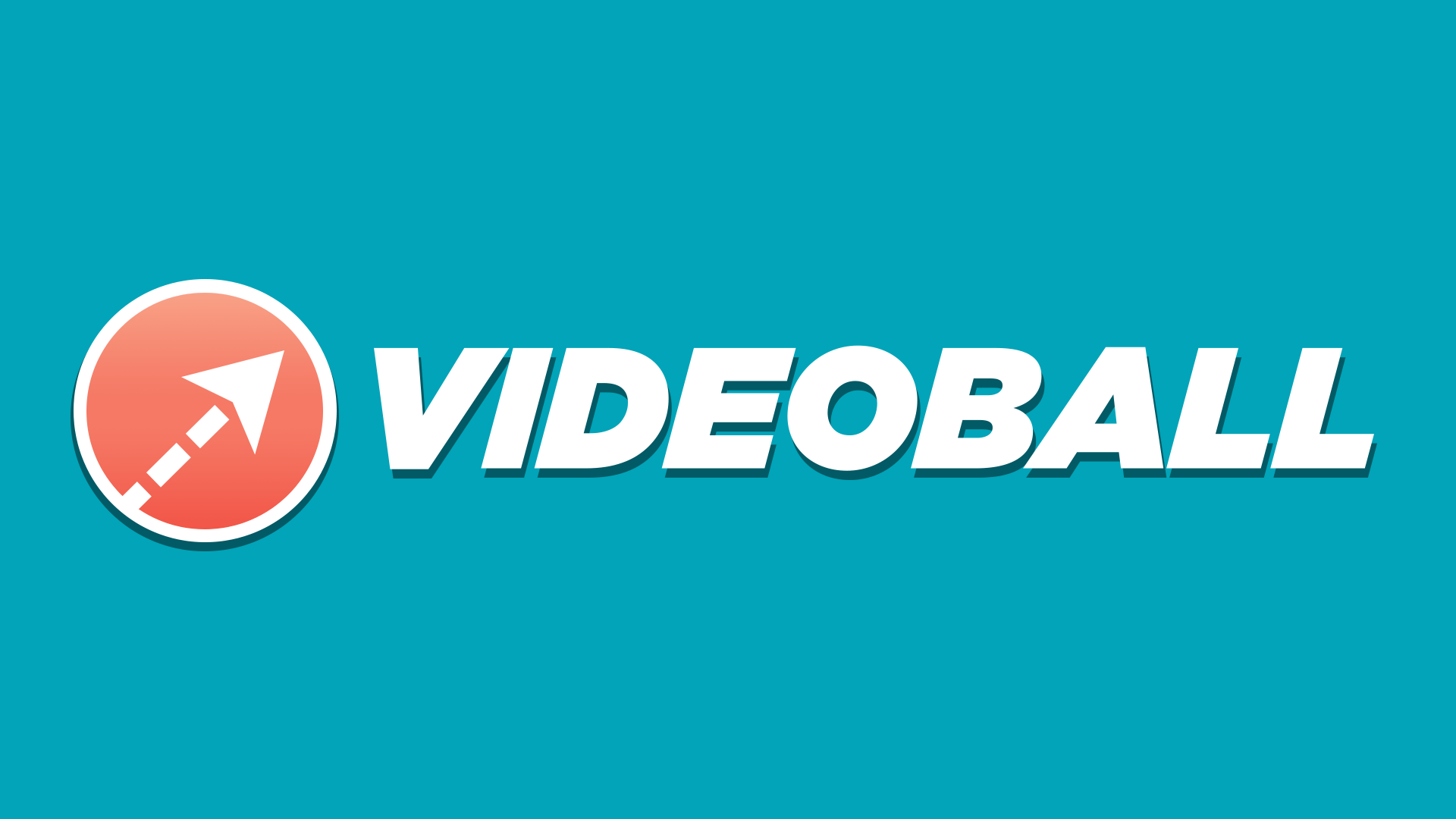
- Developer: Action Button Entertainment
- Publisher: Iron Galaxy
- Director: Tim Rogers
- Designer: Tim Rogers
- Programmers: Brent Porter; Michael Kerwin; Nicholas Wasilewski
- Artist: Brent Porter
- Composer: Ken Snyder
- Engine: Unity
- Platforms: PlayStation 4, Windows, Xbox One
- Release: July 12, 2016
- Genre: Sports
- Modes: Single-player, multiplayer

Videoball is a minimalist sports video game by Action Button Entertainment. Up to six human and computer-controlled players form two teams. Each uses an analog stick and a single button to control triangles that shoot charged projectiles at a ball and other players. The objective is to knock the ball into the opposing team's goal. Apart from exhibition matches, the game has a scenario challenge-based Arcade mode, and supports online team and ranked multiplayer matchmaking. Videoball has a simple visual style with bright colors, basic shapes, and many customization options.

The game originated in a dare to make a "one-button StarCraft". Videoball designer and Action Button founder Tim Rogers prototyped the game and challenged himself to keep its game mechanics spartan and accessible, yet challenging for competitive players. Action Button and publisher Iron Galaxy released Videoball for PlayStation 4, Windows, and Xbox One platforms on July 12, 2016. Linux and OS X releases were planned, but have since been cancelled. Videoball received favorable reviews. Critics praised the precision and craft of its game design as well as its welcoming aesthetics but remarked that its visual simplicity belied the depth of its gameplay.

== Gameplay ==
Videoball plays as a two-dimensional hybrid of air hockey and soccer on a single screen. Players form two teams of one to three players. Each player uses an analog stick to control a triangle-shaped avatar and presses a single button to shoot triangle-shaped projectiles. The object of the game is to knock one or more circular balls into the opposing team's goal. Players hold the button to charge a shot, which fires upon release. The projectile can propel the ball, block other projectiles, and incapacitate opponents. Since the shot is triangle-shaped, it can only drive the ball for some distance before the ball veers off-course.

The longer the player charges their shot, the more powerful the projectile becomes. A tap of the button shoots a small, low-impact projectile that disintegrates upon impact. A medium tap, about a second long, creates a larger, persistent triangle that dribbles the ball as long as the two continue to make contact. The third charge level shoots a large triangle that fires the ball with explosive force. This "slam" can be reversed by an opponent by firing any projectile into the slammed ball. If held for an additional second, the fourth level of a charged shot creates a defensive square barrier for the player to place on the playing field. These square barriers will disintegrate upon absorbing player projectiles. Player triangles that collide with balls or projectiles are knocked back and briefly incapacitated. Many of the game's common actions are named. For instance, players hit by projectiles are "tackled" and projectiles that hit projectiles are "intercepted".

The game supports up to six human or artificial intelligence players in local and online multiplayer, except on the PlayStation 4, which has a human player limit of four per console. Videoball has team and ranked matchmaking multiplayer modes. There is no set practice game mode, but players can train against computer-controlled opponents in exhibition matches and the scenario-based Arcade mode, in which the player faces two computer-controlled opponents in specific level configurations. The Arcade mode artificial intelligence personalities each have fitting names, such as Homer (who stays near its endzone) and Punchy (who bullies players with projectiles). Some work in pairs to establish gameplay concepts, such as Tippy, who passes the ball to Toppy, who maintains the top of the field.

Videoball's rules are fully customizable. Players choose from several color schemes, field layouts and patterns, and the number of balls in play. They can also choose the time limit and allow for special scoring, in which special shots count as more than one point. The game is visualized in all solid, bright colors and basic shapes, and features voiceover announcers. Games last an average of four minutes, though they can last several times more.

== Development ==
Videoball designer Tim Rogers describes the game as "an abstract minimalist electronic sport". Its development began as a dare from QWOP developer Bennett Foddy, Rogers's friend, to make a "one-button StarCraft". Rogers, the founder of Action Button Entertainment, made what he estimated as 40 or 50 inconsequential prototypes before adding an analog stick to the button. Videoball evolved from a slow-paced strategy game to a fast-paced sports game as it graduated from early prototypes.

Rogers compared the game's design process to the austerity of Gordon Ramsay's Kitchen Nightmares, wherein Ramsay convinces failing restaurants to reduce their menu size and make those few dishes well. Rogers commented that this emphasis on fewer elements makes each element's nuances more prominent. Polygon's Tracey Lien described the development team's process as "chasing a certain purity". Rogers conceived Videoball as a sport without narrative or artifice and thus sought to avoid traditional video game metaphors, such as knowing the triangle avatars and projectiles as "ships" or "bullets". He wanted the game to be accessible to newcomers but still fun and strategic for experts. The game designer applied his conception of Super Mario Bros. 3's "sticky friction"—a sense through which the player feels the physics affecting their avatar—to the game's controls. Rogers emphasized the importance of strategy in playing the game and noted that players in prototype games played roles or zones like in competitive basketball (e.g., center or forward positions).

Rogers has livestreamed prerelease sessions of Videoball via Twitch. He broadcast gameplay from Twitch's booth at PAX East 2014 with indie publisher Midnight City. In February 2014, PC Gamer's Wes Fenlon reported that the game still had work left in its artwork, soundtrack, new arenas, and online multiplayer mode. Videoball was selected for the July 2014 Evolution Championship Series fighting game tournament's Indie Showcase. The developers had plans to include cross-platform multiplayer, support for more than six simultaneous players, and a campaign mode. Rogers has said that ranked matchmaking was highly requested by fans. Videoball was planned for release in 2014, and ultimately launched on July 12, 2016, on PlayStation 4, Xbox One, and Microsoft Windows, with Iron Galaxy as its publisher. Linux and OS X releases were planned, but have since been cancelled.

== Reception ==
Pre-release reviewers all cited Videoball's minimalism both in aesthetics and gameplay, and compared the game with the skill and strategy of football and basketball. Before its release, PC Gamer's Wes Fenlon found himself thinking about Videoball daily after last playing two weeks prior. He credited its "addictive sort of fun" and his own excitement for local multiplayer on PC alongside titles such as Hokra and TowerFall. He felt that the game's tagline of being appropriate for both a child's birthday party and prison was correct albeit silly. Fenlon praised the game's minimalist visuals, "peppy music, and chirpy sound effects". He compared the player's controls to that of Asteroids and contrasted its simplicity with the 100-hour onboarding process for League of Legends, having learned how to play Videoball in just "a couple minutes". Jason Bohn (Hardcore Gamer) wrote that the simple controls made the game accessible for new teams to quickly strategize. Polygon's Tracey Lien compared the game's feel to basketball, football, and hockey. Citing the strong role of strategy in playing the game, she compared the array of projectiles fired to military strategy or a football play. Game Informer's Kyle Hilliard said his time with the game left him "wanting more". Graham Smith (Rock, Paper, Shotgun) found Videoball difficult to spectate and had trouble distinguishing between the players' triangle avatars. Jason Bohn (Hardcore Gamer) only became interested in the game after testing it, and credited the quality of its game design with changing his opinion.

Reception

Aggregate score
Aggregator	Score
Metacritic	82/100

Review scores
Publication	Score
Destructoid	9/10
GameSpot	8/10
Polygon	9/10
Kill Screen	77/100

The game received generally favorable reviews at launch. Reviewers noted the precision and craft of its game design. Reviewers compared Videoball to other games including the South Asian board game Carrom, and a cross between Asteroids (1979) and Rocket League (2015). GameSpot's reviewer wrote that Videoball was the 2016 equivalent of Rocket League, in that both had idiosyncratic concepts and little prior anticipation, but simple and fun gameplay.

Samit Sakar (Polygon) felt that he was in control of all parts of his play, even as he lost to computer-controlled opponents. Joshua Calixto (Kill Screen) found himself naming his preferred ball-handling techniques as he played. While Nic Rowen (Destructoid) said that he would normally avoid game mechanics discussion in his reviews, "Videoball is all about its mechanics". He praised the momentum and "pleasing grip" behind the avatars and the acceleration physics of changing direction or moving out of a full stop. Polygon's Sakar noted the game's balance between competition and enjoyment. Despite the game's simple controls, Destructoid found that sloppy play could easily backfire on the player. Jason D'Aprile (GameSpot) said that the game depends on things knocking into each other for its entertainment, such as bank shots and hitting opponents. He disliked that the only control style was tank-style controls. Polygon's initially wanted a tutorial mode but ultimately felt that the single-player Arcade mode, with set scenarios against two computer-controlled opponents, filled this need. Destructoid called the Arcade mode increasingly unfair in its addition of field disadvantages to the player. While Polygon and Destructoid praised the artificial intelligence of the computer-controlled avatars, GameSpot wrote that they were simple, and often ignored balls during single-player matches.

Critics praised the game's welcoming aesthetics, and some, its visual design. Kill Screen considered the game's affect delightful and Destructoid said its bright color scheme and rubber-like surfaces were disarming and recalled the feel of an inflatable castle. Polygon's reviewer described the title as having "old-school sensibilities" in its arcade-style visual design, with simple geometry and flat 2D art. He added that the game succeeds in particular because of its "goofy tone" and "delightful wrapper" of music, scrolling ticker, and fanciful announcers, which managed to charm him without appearing inauthentic. GameSpot's reviewer wrote that Videoball's audiovisual replication of 1990s-era Sega aesthetics triggered instant "warm and fuzzy ... nostalgia". Reviewers said that the game's visuals deceptively betrayed the depth of its gameplay. Calixto of Kill Screen concluded that Videoball "feels like it's trying to knock down barriers to entry" in its "bubbly and peaceful" visual design, with gradients and 90s Japanese arcade-style music. He thought, however, that the voiceovers were somewhat campy.

Reviewers noted the game's accessibility. Calixto of Kill Screen said that Videoball countered a trend in games culture that relied on learning professional strategies online in order to play competitively. He cited the affordances for experimentation in the game's controls and saw Videoball as being primarily concerned with awakening "its own brand of DIY metagaming", hence the reviewer's interest in naming his own techniques. Calixto further praised the game for resisting the standardization of one correct way to play with its variety of game fields. While Rowen (Destructoid) doubted that Videoball would be the future of eSports, he concluded that the game made for good local multiplayer fun, and vastly preferred the experience of local to online multiplayer. He compared the title to Super Bomberman in how quickly the game escalates from a friendly match to cut-throat competition.
