= Phantom Dust =

2004 video game

- Box art in English
- Developer: Microsoft Game Studios Japan (Note: Remastered version developed by Code Mystics)
- Publishers: JP: Microsoft Game Studios; NA: Majesco (Note: Remastered version published by Microsoft Studios)
- Director: Yukio Futatsugi
- Producer: Yukio Futatsugi
- Designer: Toshiharu Tange
- Programmer: Hiroyuki Ogasawara
- Artist: Takehiko Yamamoto
- Writers: Takashi Okamoto; Atsushi Ogata; Takayuki Satsuma
- Composers: Yoshiyuki Usui; Yuko Araki
- Platforms: Xbox; Windows; Xbox One
- Release: Xbox: JP: September 23, 2004; NA: March 15, 2005; Windows, Xbox One: WW: May 16, 2017
- Genres: Action, real-time strategy
- Modes: Single-player, multiplayer

Phantom Dust (ファントムダスト, Fantomu Dasuto) is a 2004 real-time strategy action video game developed by Microsoft Game Studios Japan and published by Microsoft Game Studios for the Xbox console. The game was released in Japan on September 23, 2004 and in North America on March 15, 2005, licensed for release in North America by Majesco.

Phantom Dust is an action/strategy game with elements of digital collectible card games. Taking place on a post-apocalyptic Earth, the unnamed player-character must interact with the few human outposts that remain, all of whom have suffered a form of amnesia, to understand what has happened to the planet. Throughout the game, the player takes missions to collect artifacts of the past to help piece the past together, and where they face off in battles with other non-player characters. The player collects numerous skills by completing missions, which are used to assemble customized "arsenals" that they take into battle arenas against enemies. The game also included a multiplayer mode, allowing players to compete against each other using their arsenals.

Microsoft sought to use Phantom Dust to draw in a larger market in Japan for the Xbox, bringing in Yukio Futatsugi, director of Panzer Dragoon, to design and produce the game. Later, it was decided to localize and release for Western markets. Phantom Dust was generally well-received, but was not a commercial success. At E3 2014, a Phantom Dust remake was announced for the Xbox One, to be developed by Darkside Game Studios. However, due to monetary issues, Microsoft decided to cancel the remake, leading to the closure of Darkside. A remastered version of the game developed by Code Mystics was released in May 2017 for Windows 10 and Xbox One.

== Gameplay ==
Phantom Dust is a video game that combines elements of third-person shooters with collectible card games. The players take the role of the unnamed protagonist, an Esper that can control the Dust that covers the earth to use in combat. The game is divided between combat stages and non-combat gameplay that includes interactions with non-player characters, reviewing and optimizing the Skills in their Arsenal (the equivalent of cards in a collectible card deck), and obtaining missions that lead to combat situations. The player may have the opportunity to select a non-player character to assist in combat.

In combat, the player, their ally, and their opponents use various skills, powered by Aura, that are collected around the level as the match proceeds in order to take their opponents' health bar to zero. Skills typically require 1 or more Aura points to activate. The player starts with minimal Aura but can increase their maximum capacity by collecting and using Aura Particles from their spawn point. When a skill is used, the Aura is temporarily drained from the player but will recover slowly up to the maximum capacity.

Skills include attack moves, defensive moves, restorative elements, and buff and debuffing skills. Skills themselves fall into 5 Schools, describing the type of damage or effect they do or have and the amount of damage that they deal or protect against. Each School has general strengths and weaknesses to other Schools. Skills are generally one-shot; once the skill is used, it is removed from the combatant's loaded skills and lost for the rest of the match. However, some skills have two or more uses and other skills can be used indefinitely.

If the player falls in combat, they will have to retry the mission. Surviving combat can earn rewards such as in-game money that the player can use to improve their Arsenal. An Arsenal has a maximum of 30 skills and will have a limit on the number of Schools represented by the Arsenal; for example, a player will start the game with an Arsenal limited to 2 Schools, but can later gain Arsenals that can utilize more Schools.

=== Multiplayer ===
Phantom Dust supports multiplayer through split-screen (on the same console), System Link or over Xbox Live, allowing up to 4 combatants to battle with an Arsenal based on their progress within the game.

== Plot ==
In Earth's far future, the surface has become an uninhabitable dust-ridden wasteland, forcing the remains of humanity to take shelter underground. Some humans are Espers, gifted with the ability to control the dust, allowing them to survive the surface for limited periods. All humans lack much of their memories, and with no records for how Earth has become this way, Espers are sent to the surface to find artifacts of the past and to seek out the fabled Ruins, the only shared memory all humans have.

One day, a team of Espers from the main human underground complex find a pair of capsules in one of the ruined structures, containing two men: the player protagonist and a man named Edgar. Both lack memories like the rest of humans, and have Esper-like powers. Edgar wears a locket with a picture of a young woman in it, his only connection to his past. The two agree to help explore the surface. During one mission, the protagonist and Edgar encounter Freia, a freelance Esper. Edgar realizes she is the woman in the locket photo, and feeling a strong connection to her, leaves with her. The next time the protagonist encounters Edgar, Edgar claims that the protagonist had betrayed him sometime in the past and fights against him.

Later, the protagonist encounters Freia alone, and after battle, recovers a memory box that has stored a set of memories that have been lost. In this case, the box shows that Edgar was an astronaut from a time prior to Earth's desolation. He flew too close to the event horizon of a black hole, and though the trip was only three days to him, he found that 10,000 years had passed on Earth due to gravitational time dilation, humanity having wiped itself out long ago, leaving the empty Dust-filled planet. Edgar found he was able to control the dust to a point where he could create self-aware human constructs, including Freia, his girlfriend before he left Earth, and the protagonist, his best friend.

On seeing this memory, many of the human characters, realizing they are just constructs, are unable to hold themselves together and disintegrate; the memory box was meant to be kept from them to prevent this self-awareness from happening. A second memory reveals that Edgar became pessimistic after creating the illusions of humanity; he sent out a large wave of energy that wiped most of the memories of those illusions while instilling the memory of the Ruins, a site where he and Freia last saw each other before he left for space. Freia later provides another memory box that shows that Freia had tried to stop Edgar before he could release this wave, and the protagonist came to help. He and Edgar got into a large battle that rendered both of them in a coma, upon which Freia placed them in the capsules to protect them.

With Freia having provided this last memory box, she believes Edgar has no more use for her, and her construct disintegrates. A furious Edgar confronts the protagonist, but loses out in the end. From the fight, the protagonist learns that this Edgar is himself a dust-made construct; the real Edgar's body succumbed to the dust ten years after returning to Earth, but before dying, had created a dust-clone of himself to continue to recreate humanity from the dust. The clone was flawed with overly pessimistic manners, and instead of rebuilding the Earth, sought instead to destroy it. When the Edgar dust-clone learns of this, he too disintegrates, leaving the protagonist as the only remaining character.

The protagonist, now aware of Edgar's goals and after burying the real Edgar's skeletal remains, begins to rebuild the Earth as the original Edgar wanted. The final shot of the game shows the protagonist walking into the desert, leaving a trail of footprints in the sand that suddenly fade away.

== Development and release ==
By 2004, Microsoft had not found great success with the Xbox console in Japan compared to the North American and European markets. To try to cater to these audiences, Microsoft developed games that were designed towards Japanese audiences with the potential to bring these to Western markets if they were successful. While early development began, Microsoft Game Studios Japan were shown an early development demo of Gears of War, where Yukio Futatsugi noticed the use of normal mapping, and decided to use it within Phantom Dust.

Phantom Dust was revealed alongside Blinx 2 in June 2004 at Japanese press events. Lead director Yukio Futatsugi and his team developed an English version concurrently with the Japanese version, and the English localization was included in the Japanese release. A United States release had originally been planned until August 2004, when Microsoft announced the U.S. version's cancellation, but left open the possibility of U.S. sales if Western demand was high enough. In December 2004, Majesco and Microsoft signed a deal to bring Phantom Dust to North America.

=== Xbox One reboot ===
While the original release of Phantom Dust was not a strong commercial success, Microsoft still valued the property, championed by Microsoft Studios' vice president Phil Spencer. Spencer had praised Phantom Dust and felt the mechanics in the original Xbox version were "ahead of their time" and could be better released in more modern gaming systems. In a November 2013 interview regarding the just-released Xbox One console, Spencer stated that discussions for a possible reboot of Phantom Dust for the new console were ongoing.

Around early 2014, Microsoft had been evaluating its older software properties and determining which ones could be brought inexpensively to the new console. Darkside Game Studios, a small studio that had assisted in a number of large titles, including the then-recent Sunset Overdrive, but now looking to develop a title on its own, started discussions with Microsoft about taking the lead on one of these titles, which included Phantom Dust, Perfect Dark, and Battletoads. Darkside had been interested in the Battletoads but was told this was off the table, so instead started discussions about bringing a reboot of Phantom Dust to the new console.

The two companies agreed in Q2 2014 for a $5 million budget to create a multiplayer-only version of Phantom Dust that would fit well into the growing eSports community, working under the codename "Babel" and targeting an August 2015 release. Shortly after starting development, Microsoft asked Darkside to include a single-player campaign alongside the multiplayer element, but did not grant any additional funds or time. Darkside, not wanting to lose their opportunity with this title, decided to start creation on a vertical slice of a single-player campaign to help convince Microsoft to provide the additional funds and time. The Darkside opted to go with an art style that balanced realism vs cartoonish approach, describing it somewhere between that of 2008's Prince of Persia and Infamous Second Son.

Microsoft formally announced this title during Electronic Entertainment Expo 2014. According to former Darkside employees, this announcement was a surprise to them, and none of the pre-rendered footage shown was work created by Darkside. Furthermore, the developers were under confidentiality agreements and could not state they were working on the title, nor was their name associated with the announcement. Darkside took this as a sign of concern from Microsoft that they would not be able to deliver. They also feared that the rendered art, far different from what they had proposed, would set certain expectations in players' minds, and had to work to adjust to meet those new expectations. Over the next several months, Microsoft would continue to add more requests for the game and to help with the planned tie-in mobile title, according to Darkside employees, but they remained committed to the project, eventually moving all fifty of their staff onto the game. Further difficulties arose when late in 2014, a key person in Microsoft who was committed to Phantom Dust left the company and was never replaced, leading to some wavering support from Microsoft.

By January 2015, Darkside had completed the promised vertical slice of the game, and according to Darkside, the feedback from Microsoft seemed very positive, giving praise to the studio. With funding and schedule issues looming, the executives of Darkside flew out to meet Microsoft in mid-February 2015 to ask for more money to make the game that Microsoft was asking for, but Microsoft refused. Microsoft contacted Darkside on February 17, 2015 to formally cancel the project, and because they had put all their efforts into the game, the studio was forced to lay off all of its employees and close down. It was estimated that about $2 million of the $5 million budget had been spent already at this point. Microsoft publicly announced that they had ended their working relationship with the studio, though they still intended to produce the title.

In June 2015, Microsoft stated that since the removal of Darkside, the project was placed on hold until they could find a studio to work with to develop the title, but they remain committed to producing a new game. Spencer admitted that they likely announced the game too early in 2014, but feels confident that they will release another Phantom Dust game with the involvement of Yukio Futatsugi, the game's creator, once they decide on the best studio to develop the title.

=== Xbox One re-release ===
Microsoft announced its plans to re-release Phantom Dust in emulation for the Xbox One during its press conference at Electronic Entertainment Expo 2016. The re-release, developed by Code Mystics, will use the original graphics and other assets updated for better resolution, and improve support for Xbox Live. The game would also run on Windows 10 as part of the Xbox Play Anywhere program. This version was expected to be released in 2017. In an interview with Polygon following the announcement, Spencer said he had only learned of this remake three weeks prior, as the effort to craft it was led by Shannon Loftis, the head of publishing for Microsoft Studios. According to Spencer, Loftis was able to use internal funds to support its development, keeping it a secret outside of Microsoft Studios, and then revealed the trailer to Spencer prior to the Expo, noting that the game was almost done at that point.

Adam Isgreen, creative director for Microsoft Studios, said that details about the re-release of Phantom Dust had been light as at the time of its announcement, they were still not clear how much they could improve upon the game, complicated by the fact that they did not have the complete final source code from Japan, requiring them to reverse engineer and hack into the original game's binaries to assure what steps they could take. The re-release would support 1080p resolution on the Xbox One and 4K resolutions on Windows, running at 30fps on both versions. They were able to rework all of the arsenal sets so that they can be updated and rebalanced through patches, and the release will include free and paid downloadable content to expand the title. The studio also reworked the single-player story mission to introduce arsenal building as a core gameplay feature much earlier compared to the original release, and will provide means for players to skip missions if they prove difficult without forfeiting rewards.

Spencer stated in January 2017 that the goal was to have the game released prior to the Electronic Entertainment Expo in June 2017, though Loftis would make the final call on the timing. The game was released on May 16, 2017, which Microsoft confirmed a day prior to that. Microsoft released it as a free-to-play title for Xbox One and Windows 10 users with Xbox Play Anywhere support.

== Reception ==
Reception

Aggregate score
Aggregator	Score
Metacritic	81/100

Review scores
Publication	Score
Famitsu	36/40
GameSpot	8.5/10
IGN	8.5/10

Phantom Dust has received "generally favorable" reviews, according to review aggregator Metacritic, with an aggregate score of 81 for the Xbox version. IGN praised the Xbox version for its "spectacular" graphics and "incredibly deep" gameplay. 1UP, awarding the game an 85 out of 100, said it "scores big points for offering the most strategic Xbox Live experience available". Many reviewers, including GameSpot, have noted the game's low purchase price of $20 as a bonus, especially in relation to its high gameplay content.

The original game had very poor sales; in Japan, its first month sales were only about 6,000 units, and in North America, only about 50,000 units were sold. The remastered version had seen more than 1 million players after the first month of its release. The game became a cult hit. In June 2013, Futatsugi expressed interest in making a Phantom Dust sequel, possibly using Kickstarter for funding.
