= Dauntless (video game) =

2019 video game

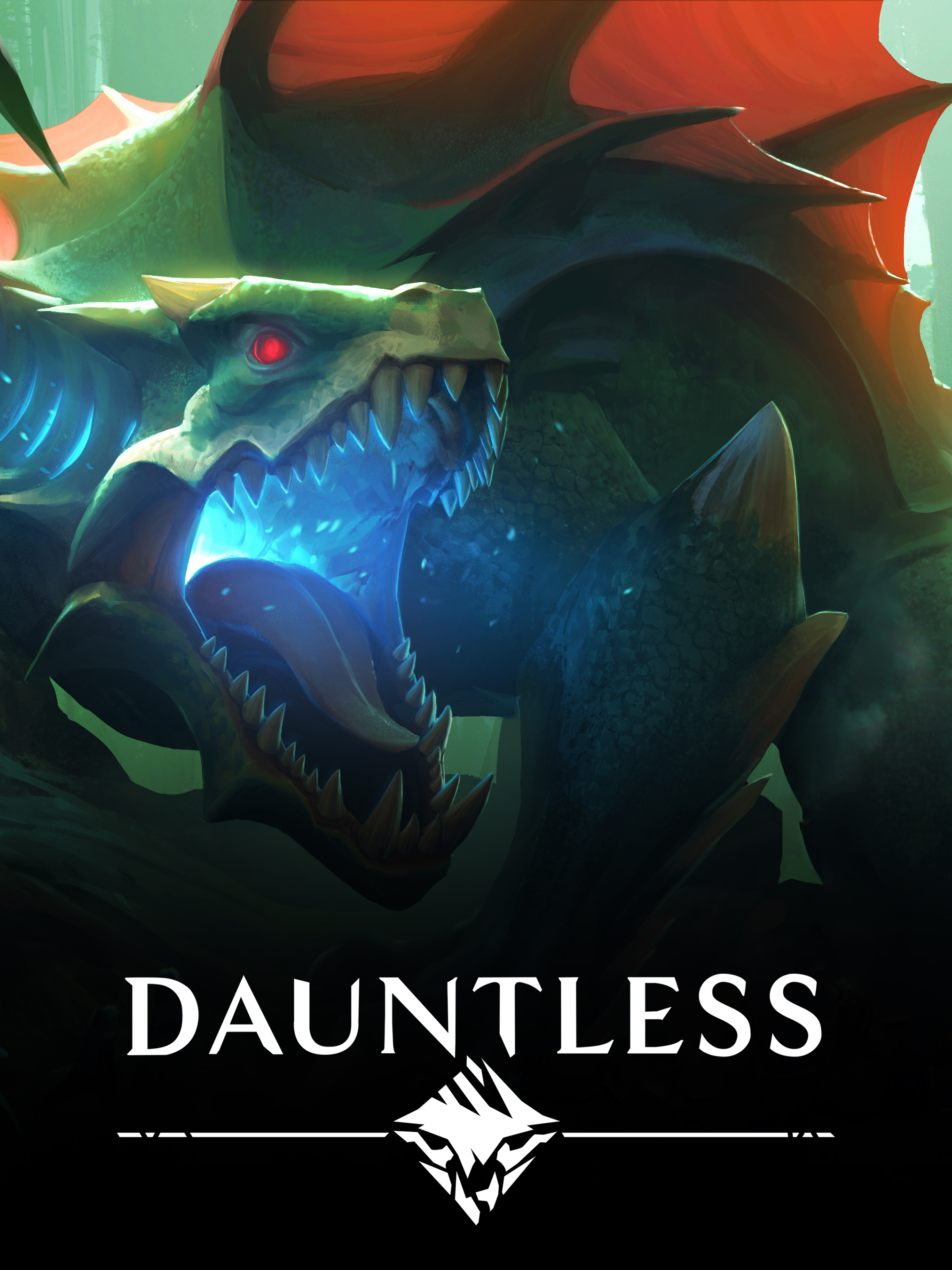
- Developer: Phoenix Labs
- Publisher: Phoenix Labs (Note: PlayStation 4 and Xbox One versions published by Epic Games)
- Engine: Unreal Engine 4
- Platforms: Microsoft Windows; PlayStation 4 Xbox One; Nintendo Switch; PlayStation 5 Xbox Series X/S
- Release: Windows, PS4, Xbox One; September 26, 2019; Nintendo Switch; December 10, 2019; PS5, Xbox Series X/S; December 2, 2021
- Genre: Action role-playing
- Modes: Single-player, multiplayer

Dauntless was a free-to-play action role-playing game developed by Phoenix Labs. Either alone or in teams with others, players would fight enormous monsters called Behemoths.

The game initially launched in beta for Microsoft Windows, in May 2018. An early access version was published by Epic Games on 21st May 2019 for PlayStation 4 and Xbox One, including full support for cross-platform play. The game was fully released for those platforms on 26th September 2019. The Nintendo Switch version was released on 10th December 2019. Versions for PlayStation 5 and Xbox Series X/S were released on 2nd December 2021.

Following the acquisition of Phoenix Labs by a blockchain company in 2023, most of the development team were made redundant by January 2025. As Dauntless was a live-service game with no offline content, the game was discontinued when its servers were shut down on 30th May 2025.

== Gameplay ==
Dauntless takes place in a fantasy setting, where a cataclysmic event has torn the world apart, releasing monstrous creatures known as Behemoths that prey on the surviving humans and absorbing the aether on the scattered islands. Players take on the role of Slayers to take down Behemoths, collecting loot that they use to craft and upgrade weapons and equipment as to take down larger and more powerful Behemoths. While hunting, the game plays as a third-person action game; the player uses a combo system to attack the creature, while monitoring their own health and stamina gauge. Such hunts can take upwards of twenty minutes of in-game time to complete. The game can be played both as single-player, cooperatively in a party of up to four or in public cooperative instances of up to six people.

== Development and release ==
Phoenix Labs was formed by former Riot Games developers Jesse Houston, Sean Bender, and Robin Mayne. In January 2017, Phoenix Labs employed 40 developers formerly from BioWare, Blizzard Entertainment, and Capcom. While a small studio compared to the AAA studios they left, Houston said that they are positioned in a way to offer "a new, unique approach to crafting AAA experiences".

Dauntless was heavily inspired by, as well as frequently compared to, Capcom's Monster Hunter series. The developers themselves have a combined playtime of over 6000 hours in various Monster Hunter titles. Dauntless was also influenced by Dark Souls and World of Warcraft. Houston credits Dark Souls specifically for helping to prove out that there is a market for "hardcore action games" focused on player versus environment encounters, which allowed them to take a safe risk on their approach to Dauntless. The game is intended to be played cooperatively as they see it as a social experience. Houston said that they had planned to make extremely difficult quests within the game, so that while most players will be able to reach a principle endgame state, only a few will be skilled enough to take on these harder quests. The game's graphics were inspired by the animated film Tangled and other Disney films and designed to avoid hyper-realism so that the game's graphics would age well.

Since its announcement, the game has garnered a great deal of interest from players, prompting Phoenix Labs to be much more transparent about the development plans for the game and interact with their fans to help guide development. They also planned to move the closed alpha sooner by a few months to get more early feedback. They later announced plans to start the alpha testing in April 2017.

The game was first revealed during The Game Awards in December 2016. Phoenix Labs planned to start with a closed alpha period, followed by an open beta period prior to the game's full release in the last quarter of 2017. The alpha was launched August 18, 2017; though players could register to be selected for the alpha, Phoenix Labs also offered premium early alpha access in for-cost packages that included in-game buffs, features for customization, and the ability to create guilds. By the PAX East 2017 event in March 2017, they had the basic combat for the game completed, and were starting the development of the impact of skills and boosts into the game. By September, Phoenix Labs pushed back the release schedule for the game, citing issues found during the closed alpha period including game stability and game balance in comparison to the Monster Hunter formula. The open beta was moved to early 2018, and formally launched in May 2018, though prior to that, they invited small waves of players to the closed beta to increase feedback. Within two weeks of the open beta period, over one million new players had played the game. By July 2018, they had seen over 2 million players.

While there would be microtransactions in the game, the developers plan to limit this to cosmetic items and temporary boosts, rather than be required for players to access game content. Houston said it was important to the team that any players shown wearing powerful armor or weapons in the game had obtained them through skill, and not via "a deep wallet". While initially they had offered cosmetics through loot boxes within the game, the team opted to remove them following criticism towards the growing trend of loot boxes that was raised in October 2017. Instead, they allow players to directly purchase cosmetics with real-world funds. Having previously worked with Electronic Arts on Mass Effect 3, one of the first games that introduced loot boxes, Houston said that they wanted to give players "a clearer relationship to the content that [they're] purchasing" and so removed loot boxes from Dauntless. Instead, Phoenix Labs opted to use a battle pass system to provide cosmetics and emotes.

Dauntless was initially planned for release only on personal computers (pc), but Phoenix Labs began discussion their game with publishers for consoles. To support their vision of Dauntless as a cooperative, multiplayer experience, Phoenix Labs decided to support cross-platform play between console and pc. Houston said that his team was not worried about potential competition from Monster Hunter: World, which was announced to be coming in 2018, during the Electronic Entertainment Expo 2017 in June 2017. Houston said "The more AAA products that are coming into this genre, the wider it's going to get", believing that Dauntless differentiates itself by being a co-operative experience using free-to-play mechanics. The studio later affirmed in May 2019 that Monster Hunter World had initially siphoned some of its player count, but that Dauntless had since grown steadily thanks to the increased interest in this style of game created by the success of Monster Hunter World.

At The Game Awards 2018, Phoenix Labs affirmed that Dauntless would release for PlayStation 4 and Xbox One in early 2019, and with future plans for Nintendo Switch and mobile versions. Phoenix Labs successfully implemented a save system in which players' progress was saved to a single account regardless of which platform they play on. By January 2019, Phoenix Labs announced the game would be migrated to the Epic Games Store and into the Store's account systems. This helped Phoenix Labs to support cross-platform play through Epic Games as Epic Games had previously implemented for Fortnite Battle Royale.

On May 21, 2019, while still in early access, Dauntless was released for PlayStation 4 and Xbox One, as well as transitioned Windows players to the Epic Games Store. Prior to release, Phoenix Labs only had anticipated having cross-platform play between Windows and Xbox One users, as they were still in discussions with Sony on PlayStation 4 cross-platform support, but by May 21, they had secured the approval from Sony. As such, Dauntless is the first game to ship at launch with cross-play between these three major platforms. Within days of launch, the 3-million player base doubled to 6 million, putting initial stress on the game's servers during this period while Phoenix worked to expand server capacity. The game officially left early access on September 26, 2019 with its 1.0 launch and first major expansion "Aether Unbound", with a total of 15 million players at that point.

The Switch version was released on December 10, 2019, and versions for the PlayStation 5 and Xbox Series X/S launched on December 2, 2021. These versions support cross-platform play and progression with Microsoft Windows, PlayStation 4, and Xbox One versions.

A major update to the game, entitled Dauntless Awakening, released on December 5, 2024, along with the game's debut on the Steam storefront. This update included new weapons, bringing the total to 18, and revamped the game's quest structure based on community feedback.

Phoenix Labs was acquired by blockchain company Forte Labs sometime in 2023. Following this, Phoenix Labs announced one set of layoffs in May 2024 due to cancellation of one game, and then said they had let go of most of its development staff in January 2025. Subsequently, the company announced in February 2025 that Dauntless servers will shut down on May 30.

As of June 2025, Dauntless servers have shut down, and the game can no longer be downloaded on all platforms.

== Reception ==
Reception

Aggregate score
| Aggregator | Score |
|---|---|
| Metacritic | PC: 78/100; PS4: 80/100; XONE: 82/100; NS: 73/100 |

Review scores
| Publication | Score |
|---|---|
| Game Informer | 8/10 |
| GameSpot | 7/10 |
| IGN | 8.5/10 |
| Nintendo Life | 7/10 |
| PCMag | 3.5/5 |
| VentureBeat | 75/100 |

Dauntless received tentatively positive reviews at the time of release. Game Informer thought that the core monster hunting gameplay was focused and fun, but warned that advanced players would run out of new content fairly quickly. GameSpot was less enthusiastic, praising the weapon variety and monster design, but criticizing the bugs in the early version of the game and the setting, story, and characters being unfulfilling and not fleshed out.

The release of Awakening in December 2024 was met with large volumes of criticism from players complaining about the change to the progression within the game and incorporation of loot boxes and battle passes which locked out much of the original content from the game. The game subsequently received an overall overwhelmingly negative review on Steam from these players.
