= Bob's Game =

Unreleased role-playing video game

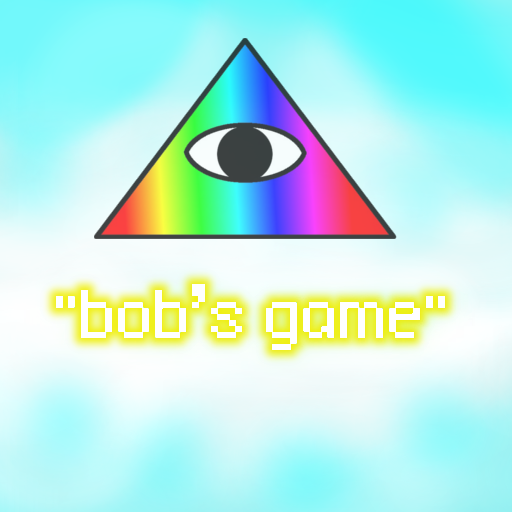
- Logo from 2016
- Developer: Robert Pelloni
- Platforms: Nintendo DS, Windows (Demo), Mac, Linux, Android
- Genre: Role-playing video game

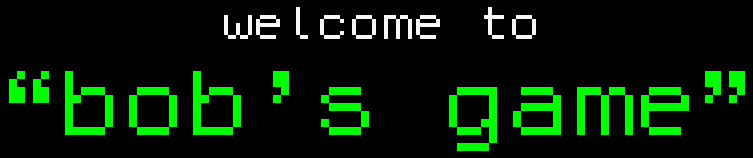
Original logo from 2008

Bob's Game (stylized as "bob's game") is a role-playing video game under development since 2003 or 2004 by independent video game developer Robert Pelloni. The project is most notable for the erratic behaviour of its developer, whose quest to get an official SDK for the Nintendo DS eventually escalated into a 30-day protest, vandalizing a store, an announcement of a competing console, and several crowdfunding campaigns, with Pelloni intermittently giving eccentric statements and interviews.

== Development ==
Bob's Game was to be a 2D role-playing video game developed solely by Pelloni since 2004 for the Nintendo DS. According to an interview he gave to the Orlando Sentinel, Pelloni spent over five years and over 15,000 hours working on it. It was to feature over 200 characters and, according to the interview, "more gameplay than just about anything out there on the portable system." In August 2008, Pelloni posted a preview of it on YouTube that had received over 100,000 views by September 15, 2008.

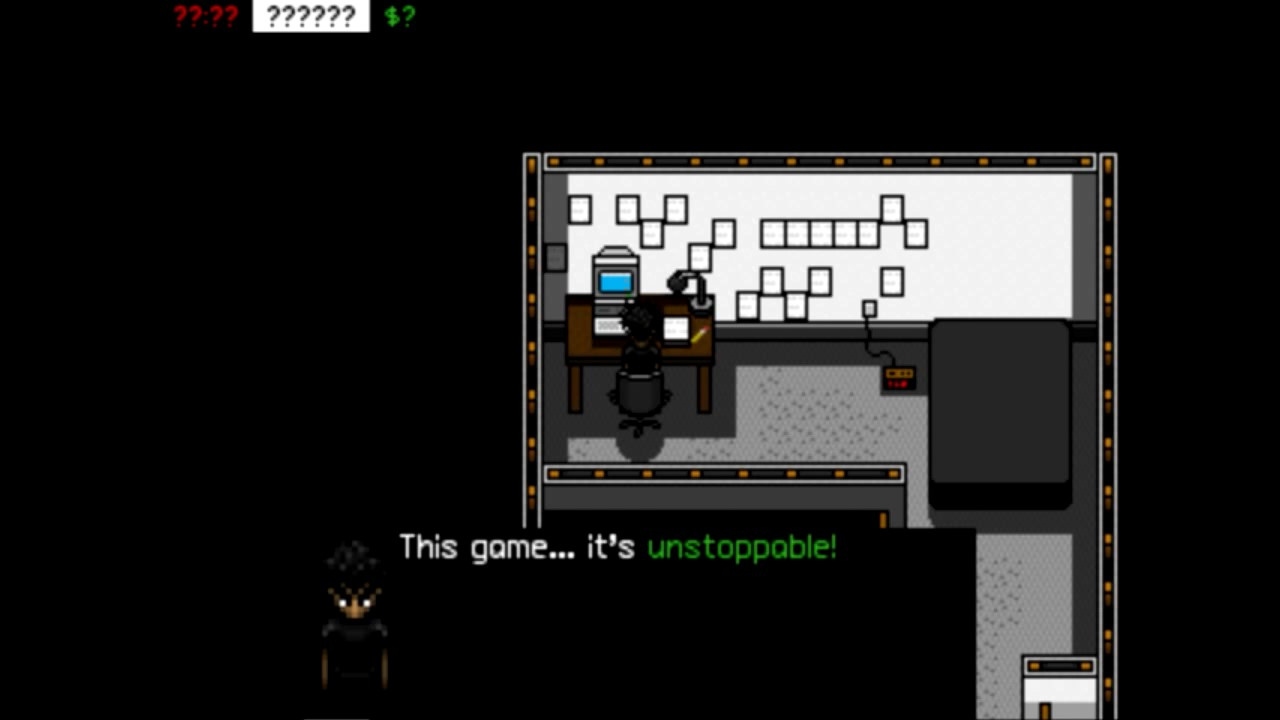
Gameplay screenshot from an early version in 2009

Development started as a result of a conversation about video games that Pelloni had with friends, discussing creating a video game based in the suburbs that had a Dungeons & Dragons mindset, similar to the EarthBound series. He also drew motivation from titles such as Super Mario 64, Super Metroid, the Dance Dance Revolution series, and a similar game developed by one person titled Cave Story. According to the Sentinel interview, Pelloni was fascinated by other similar video game projects getting published after participating in online Internet forums. At the same time, he was also "disheartened" over how the video game industry did business, saying that "it's a standard practice for some publishers to take a game engine and put in licensed assets to coincide with, say, a movie release for example." This motivated Pelloni to self-develop Bob's Game and, as a result, he spent most of 2006 and 2007 in isolation while developing.

Pelloni said that the hardest part of developing was the background graphics, as he had no artistic experience. He would not consider it "100% complete" until he received the software development kit (SDK) from Nintendo, which would allow him to compile it according to Nintendo's code specifications. However, he stated in the Sentinel interview, "[Y]ou can't get access to [the SDK] unless you've published a game before." Pelloni had received responses from some video game publishers but did not start talks with any of them as he wanted to retain creative rights. As a replacement for the standard credits roll at the end of most video games, he said he would provide a summary of the making of Bob's Game.

=== Publisher rejection and protest ===
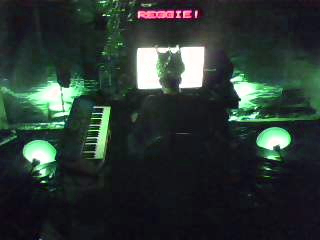
Robert Pelloni in 2009 protesting by locking himself in his own room. Pelloni broadcast a live feed of him in his room via a webcam (pictured)

According to an article in The Escapist, in 2008 Pelloni was directed by Nintendo to talk to the WarioWorld division, which directed him to marketing; marketing then directed him back to the WarioWorld division. Nintendo told him that they would inform him of their decision whether to grant him an SDK for Bob's Game in between six and eight weeks. No response came from Nintendo. After 17 weeks of trying and failing to get Nintendo to provide him with the SDK, on December 11, 2008, Pelloni decided to publicly protest by locking himself in his room for 100 days or until Nintendo provided him with the SDK, whichever came first. According to Owen Good of Kotaku, he staged the protest in an effort to gain publicity by making Nintendo look like a corporate bully beating down on an indie game developer. His room had no Internet access (save for broadcasting a live feed of him in his room via a webcam) or television and had only a mobile phone with which he could make calls and send emails and the materials he needed to work on it. Pelloni made the following comment when he decided to protest:

"I cannot leave this viridian room. The door is locked and barricaded from the outside. I am sleeping behind the camera, and yes- I've got a shower. Food is delivered once a week by a friend...This is my 100 day protest to Nintendo!"

— Robert Pelloni

Pelloni's protest garnered popularity on various Internet forums and websites. On the 21st day, December 31, 2008, he started to release addresses of Nintendo executives and to send Nintendo of America president Reggie Fils-Aimé holiday greetings. He also threatened to bundle the game as a killer app using a Nintendo DSi homebrew device, and said that he was translating the game into several languages, planning to release it worldwide to "significantly cut into Nintendo's bottom line". According to Chris Greenhough of Joystiq, he said that he was talking to a Chinese firm about releasing Bob's Game on a flash cartridge and negotiating with Walmart to distribute the game. He also threatened to get the game released on other distribution platforms including Xbox Live Arcade, Steam, the iPhone, and the PlayStation Network. On January 6 he declared that he was better than Shigeru Miyamoto, Shigesato Itoi, Hideo Kojima, John Carmack, and Will Wright combined. Though he apologized for his comment two days later, according to Andy Chalk in an Escapist article, he threatened to "exact a horrific vengeance if the company continued to deny him the SDK." At this point, he started to complain about paranoia and having persistent headaches.

=== Protest aftermath ===
The protest ended on the 30th day on January 10, 2009, with Pelloni saying that he was suffering from a "wicked headache". Pelloni described Nintendo as a "heartless corporation, only interested in the biggest profits". He ransacked his room in frustration and posted a lengthy comment on his website, declaring his defeat. In light of the statement and the lack of any visible movement on the webcam, a concerned user from the /v/ board on 4chan was able to retrieve Pelloni's telephone number from his Whois information. The user contacted his sister in an attempt to have somebody check on him. Then, on January 11, the police broke into his room to check on him, finding him well.

According to Rob Hearn in an article on the website Pocket Gamer, shortly after conceding, Pelloni resumed his protest and attack on Nintendo. He had apparently worked himself into Bob's Game, portraying himself as the main antagonist and final boss. He redefined the object of it as being to take down "Gantendo" (a portmanteau of "Ganon" and "Nintendo"), with the main protagonist being named "Yuu". In addition, he had retooled the story to incorporate events leading up to and after his protest. On February 1, Griffin McElroy of Joystiq reported that Pelloni had vandalized the Nintendo World Store in New York City, saying that this was "Level 50" of his newly revived protest.

On February 6, 25 weeks after sending his request for an SDK, Pelloni received a letter from Nintendo rejecting his request. According to JC Fletcher of Joystiq, this was the same form letter that Xiotex Studios received on their rejection to develop games for WiiWare. In the letter, Nintendo said that they require "secure business facilities, sufficient equipment and staffing, financial stability and other attributes that would distinguish the developer" and that they deal with confidential information, making them highly selective in whom they grant SDK access.

In March 2009, Pelloni announced on his website that the protest and ensuing events had been a viral marketing ploy to advertise Bob's Game. According to an email he sent to the press, he said that he had been able to fool the entire Internet gaming community and expressed disappointment in the media, saying that "'angry developer litters' is considered more newsworthy than 'angry developer'." He referred to the marketing of Bob's Game as "an old-school marketing style for an old-school style game." According to James Stephanie Sterling of Destructoid, he claimed that his stunts "are the mark of somebody who deserves to be a part of the game industry."

== Release ==
On March 31, 2009, it was reported that Pelloni had released a playable demo of Bob's Game, which, according to his website, required a flash cartridge and was playable on the NO$GBA emulator. On April 2, 2009, MTV.com's Stephen Totilo interviewed Reggie Fils-Aime about the Bob's Game incident. Fils-Aime said that Pelloni had applied to be a licensed developer for Nintendo, but Nintendo rejected his application after a standard evaluation because he did not meet their requirements. He noted that he is happy that people are motivated by games developed under similar circumstances, such as 2D Boy's World of Goo as well as Tetris and Pokémon, and that Nintendo enjoys "taking big ideas with small budgets and bringing them to life."

=== Portable console announcement ===
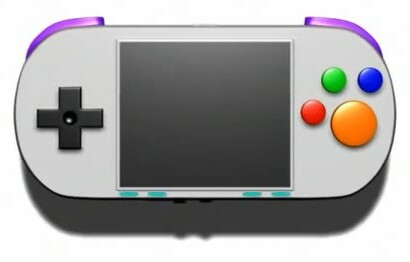
In 2011, Pelloni announced a portable console called the nD, (pictured) it never released

On March 4, 2011, Pelloni announced a new portable console called the nD that would be sold for $20 with Bob's Game as the first title. On June 9, 2011, the final day of Electronic Entertainment Expo 2011, Pelloni uploaded a video called "nD Commercial" to YouTube. In early 2013 Bob silently deleted all the references to the nD and put up a live stream of him working on to his official site bobsgame.com. As of May 8, 2013, the website has been updated to show a "new phase" of Bob's Game called "Bob's Game Online: nDworld". After playing a short demo, players are asked to register and after doing so are directed to a website telling them to wait for future updates; at first they were also told they would have to pay for the service in the future.

=== Crowdfunding campaigns ===
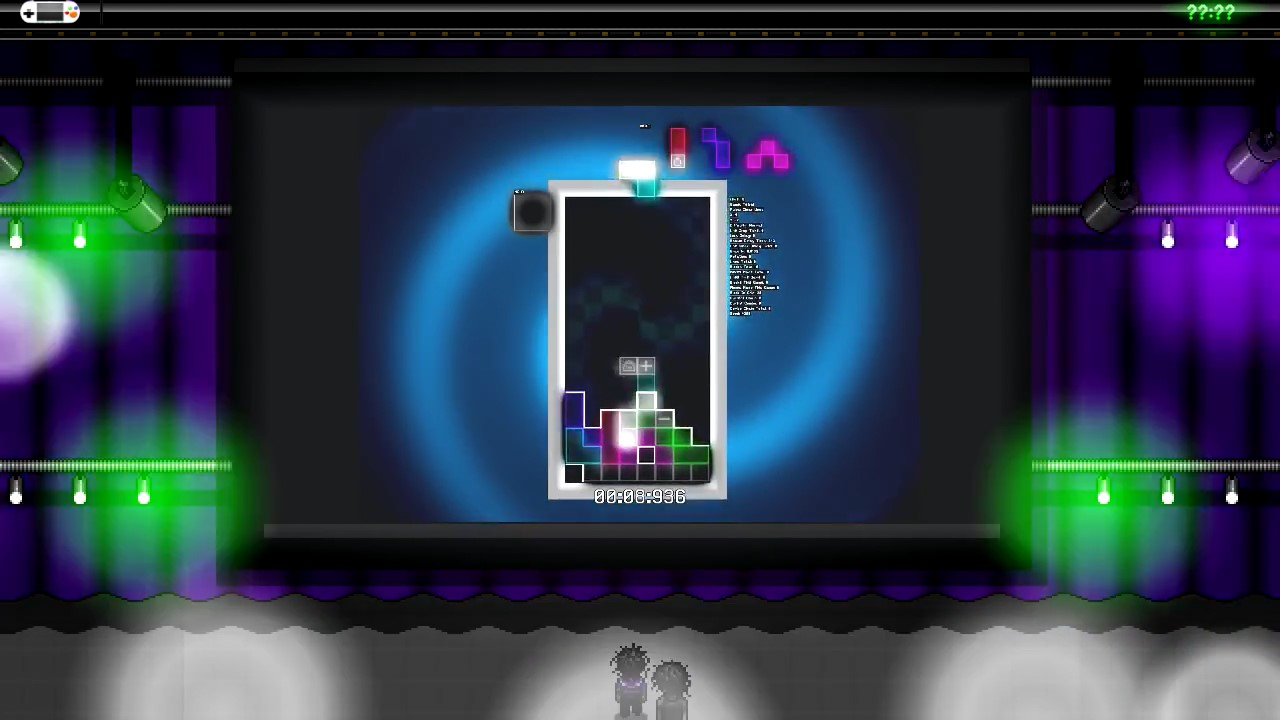
Gameplay screenshot from a 2013 version. Pelloni started that he wanted to separate Bob's Game into a puzzle game and a RPG game.

On November 25, 2013, Pelloni made a Kickstarter for the puzzle game from Bob's Game, which failed on December 15, 2013, with $477 out of the goal of $6,667. Despite the Kickstarter failing, it was released on the Ouya on January 1, 2014. Shortly after the Kickstarter failed, Pelloni created a Patreon page, which he later removed. On April 23, 2014, Pelloni launched the first and only Kickstarter for the previously announced action-RPG Bob's Game, saying that if the crowd-funding venture was successful, he would invest the money to work from a "hack-van" in order to complete development on the title, and if not, he would put development on indefinite hiatus. On May 22, 2014, with 17 hours left, it was successfully funded. Pelloni acknowledged this success shortly thereafter on his website. According to a Forbes article published in January 2015, the developer has given up on the project, and plans to refund backers. However, on January 20, 2016, Pelloni denied this claim as he stated via Kickstarter that he had not permanently stopped working on Bob's Game, and had been pitching Bob's Game to investors and publishers, to no success. Pelloni cited an unstable living condition and extensive re-writes to its code as additional reasons for the delay, he also started to separate Bob's Game into a puzzle game and a RPG game.

=== Windows, Mac, Linux ===
In May 2016 an alpha version of Bob's Game was successfully Steam Greenlighted. In September 2016, the puzzle game Bob's Game was released on itch.io for Windows, MacOS and Linux while being under ongoing development. This was followed by a full Steam release on February 21, 2017. On June 24, 2021, Bob's Game was renamed to ok, shortly after the Steam store page for it was removed.

=== Source code release ===
In August 2016 the source code was released on GitHub under a non-commercial source available software license, to allow the community to contribute. The author says that he wrote it originally in C, switched then to Java, and later converted it with an automatic code converter to C++.
