= Juan Catalan case =

American homicide case

- Location: Los Angeles, California
- Date: May 12, 2003; 10:40 p.m.
- Attack type: Shooting, revenge killing
- Deaths: 1
- Victim: Martha Puebla
- Perpetrators: Javier Covarrubias, Raul Robledo, Jose Ledesma
- No. of participants: 3
- Verdict: Javier Covarrubias, Raul Robledo and Jose Ledesma sentenced to life in prison for murder; Juan Catalan found innocent
- Litigation: Lawsuit by Juan Catalan against Los Angeles settled in March 2007 for $320,000; Lawsuit by family of Martha Puebla against Los Angeles and LAPD results in them being awarded $1 in compensation in 2010
- Judge: Leslie A. Dunn

The Juan Catalan case is a 2003 homicide case in the United States, in which Los Angeles resident Juan Catalan was arrested in August 2003 and falsely accused of murdering 16-year-old Martha Puebla, a police informant and witness in his brother's trial. Juan Catalan maintained his innocence and said he was not at the scene of the crime, but rather at Dodger Stadium watching a baseball game with his daughter on the day of the murder.

After spending five and a half months in Los Angeles County Jail and facing potential death penalty, Catalan was found innocent in January 2004 after his lawyer managed to prove that he was present at the stadium during the murder, relying on Catalan's cell phone records and footage of him by HBO crew, who happened to film the stadium for the television show Curb Your Enthusiasm. Afterwards, Juan Catalan filed a lawsuit against Los Angeles for defamation, police misconduct and false imprisonment. In March 2007, Los Angeles City Council paid Catalan $320,000 to settle the lawsuit.

Two Vineland Boys gang members, Jose Ledesma and Raul Robledo, were later arrested and sentenced to life imprisonment for the murder of Martha Puebla. Multiple documentary films about the case were made.

== Murders ==
=== 2002 murder of Enrique Acosta and Christian Vargas ===
In 2002, brother of Juan Catalan, Mario Catalan Jr., was driving a Ford Mustang with the Vineland Boys gang member Jose Ledesma in Lankershim Boulevard, a thoroughfare the gang considered their territory. After shouting "Where you from?" at Enrique Acosta, who was a driver of a nearby car, Ledesma shot and killed him and wounded a passenger, then fled the scene with Mario. A few days later, Joseé Ledesma arrived at the home of his girlfriend, 16-year-old Martha Puebla, who was waiting for him with her friends; Maribel and Cristian Vargas. Upon arrival, Ledesma pulled out a gun and shot Cristian Vargas five times, he was found dead at the scene.

After the murders, Jose Ledesma went into hiding from law enforcement in Tijuana together with Mario Catalán Jr. A friend of Christian Vargas told the police that Martha Puebla had identified Ledesma as the person responsible for the murders; however, during questioning, she stated that she had merely been speculating and provided little details about the crime. Subsequently, the police searched the Ledesma's family home and discovered a loaded assault rifle under his mattress, as well as letters from members of the Vineland Boys.

Two days after the search, Mexican police received a call regarding a domestic violence incident involving a fight between Catalan Jr. and his girlfriend. Upon questioning, the girlfriend said that the two men were wanted in Los Angeles for murder. Jose Ledesma and Mario Catalan Jr. were then taken into custody and extradited to a jail in North Hollywood. During the interrogation, LAPD homicide detective Martin Pinner told Ledesma that a witness had identified him and gave him a mugshot lineup where his face was circled with the initials "M.P." (Martha Puebla) next to it along with a caption: "Those is the guy that shot my friends boyfriend" and her signature. The writings, including her signature, were forged by Pinner and it was him who circled the photograph. After being returned to his holding cell, Ledesma used a nearby payphone to talk to his friend, who was Vineland Boys member Javier Covarrubias. During the conversation, Ledesma ordered the murder of Martha Puebla, saying; "You know the bitch who lives…by my house?…Her name starts with an M. I need her to disappear. She’s throwing dimes”. The conversation was recorded, but the detective did not listen to it.

=== 2003 murder of Martha Puebla ===
Jose Ledesma and Mario Catalan Jr. were both charged with murder; a preliminary hearing for Mario Jr. was scheduled for May 1, 2003. A search warrant was executed on Catalan Jr.'s family house where they found drugs. Despite belonging to Catalan Jr., Juan Catalan, who was in the house with his father, decided to take the blame for them because he feared the police would arrest his father for drug possession. Juan Catalan was charged with intent to distribute marijuana and faced up to five years in prison. Catalan hired attorney Todd Melnik to represent him after hearing other inmates speak of him as a “badass”.

At the preliminary hearing for Mario Catalan Jr., attended by Juan Catalan, Martha Puebla stated that she did not want to be there and did not know the details of the murder. On May 12, 2003, Martha Puebla was sitting outside her home in Sun Valley, talking to a friend. A man approached her from behind and asked who she was. When she replied, "I'm Martha, you know me", the man pulled out a 9mm pistol and shot Puebla in the face, killing her. He then chased to a man named Juan Ibáñez, who had been standing next to her, and fired in his direction, causing him to drop his phone at the scene. The shooting happened at 10:40 p.m. Three days after the incident, detective Pinner was informed by the ex-girlfriend of a Vineland Boys gang member that the gang was responsible for Puebla’s death; however, no progress was made in the investigation. The police questioned Juan Ibáñez, who recalled seeing a car circling the block, parking at the end of the street and seeing a man exiting the vehicle and walking past him and then shooting Puebla twice. The police had shown Ibáñez a list of mugshots, and he circled two of them for resemblance to the killer.

Later, two police officers patrolling Burbank Boulevard detained a suspicious man on a bicycle who claimed to be a member of the Vineland Boys. After being searched, the man agreed to be interviewed about the murder of Martha Puebla. He told the officers that Puebla’s killer was a man named Juan who had a girlfriend named Alma and a brother named Mario, he also falsely claimed that Juan drove a Ford F-150 pickup truck and had recently returned from Mexico, where he had been hiding from police. Without verifying the claims, the police decided to arrest Juan Catalan.

== Juan Catalan's arrest ==
=== Jail ===
Juan Catalan was arrested in August 2003 and charged with murder of Martha Puebla made in retaliation for her testifying against his brother. The arrest was conducted by LAPD Special Investigation Section, who intercepted him as he was driving to his father's store. After spending six hours in a jail cell, Catalan was interrogated by detective Pinner who accused him of murdering Puebla and told him that he was identified by various witnesses. Catalan insisted on his innocence, stating that he did not know why he had been arrested and had no connection to the murder. He asked to take a lie detector test but was refused.

Catalan spent three days in Van Nuys Jail before a judge transferred him to a jail in Los Angeles County. After Catalani’s arrival, a trustee inmate, who was allowed to freely walk around the facility, learned that a new inmate charged with murdering a child had arrived, though he did not know his identity; he began discussing with another inmate how they might hurt or kill him. The trustee was later detained by deputies and put solitary confinement after they caught him looking through inmate files in search of the name. Two days after the incident, Catalan was transferred to a Wayside maximum security jail where he meet with his attorney Todd Melnik.

=== Investigation, trial and release ===
Juan Catalan told Todd Melnik that he was innocent and had an alibi; watching a baseball game with his six-year-old daughter at Dodger Stadium during Martha Puebla's murder, where they watched the Los Angeles Dodgers lose to the Atlanta Braves 11-4 minutes before the murder took place 20 miles away from the stadium. Melnik issued subpoenas to the Los Angeles Dodgers and its owner, Fox Networks, requesting the television recordings and surveillance camera footage of the baseball game. The footage showed the spot where Catalan had been sitting during the game, but the image was too blurry to make him out. Melnik spent 24 hours reviewing the footage, which was three hours long.

Later, Catalan told Todd Melnik that he remembered seeing a film crew in the bleachers during the game, filming something. Melnik questioned stadium staff, who gave him the phone number of a crew member from the HBO television show Curb Your Enthusiasm. In December 2003, Melnik was allowed to enter the show's studio to review the footage for the Curb Your Enthusiasm episode "Carpool Lane" together with Larry David, which was being filmed at the stadium on the day of the murder. After reviewing several tapes lasting five to seven minutes, Melnik managed to find the time segment showing Catalan walking at the stadium, captured between 8:58 p.m. and 9:10 p.m. Since the murder of Martha Puebla happened shortly after 10:00 p.m. a dozen miles from the stadium, the evidence was insufficient to dismiss the case. The prosecution stated that Catalan still had enough time commit the murder. Inspired by O. J. Simpson case, Melnik decided to find Catalan's cell phone data using cell phone towers near the stadium to prove his innocence.

Beth Silverman, nicknamed "Sniper" because she had never lost a murder trial, was the prosecutor of Juan Catalan. If convicted of murder, Catalan could potentially have been sentenced to death. A preliminary hearing took place on December 17, 2003. Detectives said that Catalan was identified as the killer by Juan Ibáñez, the only witness to the murder of Marta Puebla, who picked him from a series of mugshots. No recording was made the first time, so the judge ordered the procedure to be repeated with an audio recording, during which Ibáñez once again identified Catalan as the killer.

Melnik challenged Ibáñez at the hearing, stating that his description of the killer's skin colour and height did not match Catalan. He also questioned detective Pinner about the killer’s vehicle, which witnesses had described as a dark blue or black Toyota, Honda, or Chevrolet with tinted windows. Melnik said Catalan did not own a car matching that description and that he had arrived at the stadium in a Chevrolet Tahoe. The motive of the murder was also questioned by him, as Martha Puebla has only testified as a witness in the murder of Cristian Vargas, committed by José Ledesma, in which Mario Catalan Jr. was not involved, meaning her death would have gave him no benefit.

In a January 2004 hearing, Todd Melnik presented Catalan's cell phone data on the day of the murder. The records showed that on May 12, 2003, at 10:11 p.m, Catalan was called by his girlfriend Oseguera while he was at Dodger Stadium, pinging a cell phone tower located within a one-mile radius. At 10:36 p.m, he callled Oseguera back to inform her that he got back home. The prosecutor argued that Catalan was at a distance that made it possible for him to commit the murder. In response Melnik said that minutes prior to the murder, the killer's black Chevrolet Malibu circled around her block. It was confirmed by several boys who were with Puebla and left shortly before the murder, as well as by a man she had called on her family's cordless phone on the day of the murder. Melnik stated that it would have been impossible for Catalan to leave the parking lot, switch vehicles, and shoot Puebla.

Judge Leslie A. Dunn found Catalan innocent and dismissed the case, saying; “I do not have any suspicion that the defendant committed this crime, and this case is dismissed”. Catalan was released from jail, being incarcerated five and a half months.

== Aftermath ==
=== Juan Catalan ===
Juan Catalan described his release as the "happiest moment" in his life. However, he was arrested again on January 5, 2004 for unresolved drug possession charges with prosecutor Beth Silverman being assigned to the case. Todd Melnik proposed crediting the time Catalan had already served on the murder charge and releasing him, but Silverman refused. She offered him the option of serving a two-week sentence in the county jail and being released; otherwise, the drug charge would be referred to court, and he be sentenced for up to five years in prison.

Catalan accepted the offer and was put in a cell with black gang members, who recently had two of their members killed by a Latino gang and were planning a revenge. Because Catalan was Latino, he feared that they might kill him. On his last night in jail, a trustee inmate handed blankets to gang members, one of the ways knives are smuggled into cells. During the night, a sheriff's deputy visited the cell and asked Catalan if he was all right. Fearing that gang members would kill him if he answered in the negative, he said yes; however, the deputy did not believe him and moved him to another cell housing Latino inmates, where he spent the rest of the night. After his release, Juan Catalan became friends with Todd Melnik, who set up a GoFundMe page for him. ABC News reported that Catalan became a "devoted fan" of Curb Your Enthusiasm.

=== Legal action ===
On July 29, 2004, Juan Catalan filed a lawsuit against LAPD, the city of Los Angeles and four detectives accusing them of defamation, misconduct and false imprisonment, and seeking unspecified damages. Catalan’s civil attorney, Gary S. Casselman described the case as a "nightmare that only by good fortune turned out right". The defendants in the lawsuit were listed as police chief William J. Bratton, detectives Mike Coffey, Martin Pinner and Tim Shaw, as well as police commander William Sweet. On March 8, 2007, Los Angeles City Council settled the lawsuit for $320,000. Detective Martin Pinner was barred from participating in murder investigations while detective Mike Coffey was transferred to the auto fraud unit. In court hearing, detective Pinner said that Puebla did not circle Ledesma's photo, and called it a "ruse".

On May 15, 2008, family of Martha Puebla filed a lawsuit against the city of Los Angeles, LAPD, police chief William J. Bratton and detective Martin Pinner, alleging that they caused her death by failing to provide her with adequate protection as a witness. On April 17, 2010, a federal jury found that detectives Martin Pinner and Juan Rodriguez had acted maliciously and recklessly toward Martha Puebla, but also determined that the greater share of the blame lay with her family. The jury determined that the family was 80% at fault, while the detectives were 20% at fault. Judge Christina A. Snyder gave the family $1 in compensation for violations of their constitutional rights.

Attorney representing the city stated that Marta Puebla and her family had been warned of the dangers she might face by testifying in the trial and had been offered participation in a witness relocation program, an offer they declined. Deputy City Prosecutor Elizabeth Fitzgerald stated that it was Puebla’s testimony at the preliminary hearing, rather than interrogation by detectives, that led to her murder. According to Fitzgerald, Puebla provided the court with information about Ledesma, including his ties to the gang, that could have caused the gang to retaliate against her.

In June 2006 Javier Covarrubias, Raul Robledo and Jose Ledesma were charged with murder of Martha Puebla. Federal prosecutors sought the death penalty. In August 2007, Raul Robledo and Jose Ledesma pleaded guilty to murder and drug trafficking to avoid the death penalty, accepting life in prison without parole if convicted. On November 5, 2007, Javier Covarrubias was sentenced to life in prison for murder of Martha Puebla and other crimes. Judge John Walter described his crimes as “most heinous and most despicable”. On January 28, 2008 Ledesma was sentenced to life in prison without parole. On June 29, 2008, Raul Robledo was also sentenced to life in prison.

=== Media coverage and documentaries ===
The first article about the case was made by New York magazine, attracting nationwide attention. After his release, Catalan moved to New York CIty with his family where gave multiple interviews, appearing on television shows such as Good Morning America and The Today Show. On September 29, 2017, a documentary film about the case titled Long Shot was released on Netflix, featuring interviews with Larry David and Catalan's lawyer. The 40-minute film was created by Jacob LaMendola and produced by company Hayden5, taking him five years to create. A short documentary film about the case by HBO was also made. On September 2, 2018, Juan Catalan was interviewed by Australian journalist Liam Bartlett for television program 60 Minutes.
