= La bellissima estate =

The Beautiful Summer
- Directed by: Sergio Martino
- Screenplay by: Sauro Scavolini; Sergio Martino
- Story by: Luciano Martino; Sauro Scavolini
- Produced by: Luciano Martino
- Starring: Alessandro Cocco; Senta Berger; John Richardson
- Cinematography: Giancarlo Ferrando
- Edited by: Daniele Alabiso
- Music by: Alberto Pomeranz; Luciano Michelini
- Production company: Dania Film
- Distributed by: Titanus (Italy); Toho Towa (Japan)
- Release dates: 6 December 1974 (Italy); 27 September 1975 (Japan); 13 June 1978 (U.S.)
- Running time: 95 minutes
- Country: Italy
- Language: Italian

The Beautiful Summer (Italian: La bellissima estate) is a 1974 Italian melodrama film directed by Sergio Martino. It stars Alessandro Cocco, Senta Berger and John Richardson.

The film is part of the genre of melodramatic films known as "lacrima movies" or "tearjerker movies". It has been best remembered for the soundtrack piece "Il barone rosso" by Luciano Michelini, which would eventually become the theme song of the comedy show, Curb Your Enthusiasm. It was originally released in the United States as Summer to Remember, with other titles such as Smile of Love and Never Ending Love.

== Plot ==
Gianluca, son of Emanuela and Vittorio Bennati, is in Versilia for the summer holiday. His father, to whom he is very attached, often stays away both for business (he is an engineer and owner of an industry) and because he has a hobby of car racing as an amateur, secretly from his wife. Consequently, when his mother announces that they will not return to Milan in the autumn, Gianluca suspects that it is because of an imminent divorce between his parents: the misunderstanding isn't helped by Manuela's friendship with the architect Giorgio Savona, with whom he often meets. The difficulties of being accepted by his fellow villagers and his friendship with little Olga, the daughter of millionaires like him, are not enough to calm the boy who one day, secretly from his mother, manages to escape to Milan, in search of his father, with the help of his friend Marco and the bizarre "The Red Baron". There he discovers that his father died in an accident during a car race. Distraught, Gianluca returns home, but a few days later he crashes with a toy cart and suffers serious injuries: admitted to hospital, he dies in the arms of his desperate mother, who still dreams of reuniting with his father.

== Cast ==
- Alessandro Cocco as Gianluca Bennati
- Senta Berger as Emanuela Bennati
- John Richardson as Vittorio Bennati
- Lino Toffolo as "The Red Baron"
- Caterina Boratto as The princess
- Mario Erpichini as Giorgio Savona
- Renzo Marignano as Pietro, the driver
- Duilio Cruciani as Marco
- Brizio Montinaro as The Teacher
- Sabina Gaddi as Olga
- Gildo di Marco as Giuseppe
- Carla Mancini
- Bernardo Toccaceli
- Lorenzo Piani

== Release ==
The Beautiful Summer was originally released in Italy on December 6, 1974 where it was distributed by Titanus.

In Japan, the film was released on September 27, 1975, and was retitled Smile of Love; it was released by Toho-Towa. Through 1978, the film was released in other countries, and on June 13, the film was released in the United States, and other countries, and was given the title Summer to Remember.

== See also ==
- List of Italian films of 1974
