= Frolic (instrumental) =

1974 song composed by Luciano Michelini

Frolic
A 18-second instrumental sample of "Frolic", an instrumental track composed in 1974 that was later used in the TV series Curb Your Enthusiasm and later became subject of internet memes.

"Frolic" is an instrumental by the Italian composer Luciano Michelini. It was composed in 1974 for the film La bellissima estate, where it was used to represent the character of the barone rosso. "Frolic" is better known as the theme from the American sitcom Curb Your Enthusiasm. It was chosen by the series' creator, Larry David, who had heard the music in a bank advertisement four years prior. Apart from that, "Frolic" has been used as backing music for several advertisements, and in a rap song by Snoop Dogg.

"Frolic" takes inspiration from circus music and bossa nova. The piece features a combination of a tuba, a mandolin, a banjo, and a piano, as well as several instruments used for effects. This combination of instruments is considered unusual and has been a frequent subject of commentary.

== History ==
=== La bellissima estate ===
Luciano Michelini is an Italian composer, born in 1945. Michelini originally composed "Frolic" for the 1974 film, La bellissima estate. When used in the film, the song was called "Il barone rosso". It was created by Michelini to represent the barone rosso (red baron), a comedic character played by Lino Toffolo who entertains a group of children. Following La bellissima estate, "Frolic" was included in a music library (Universal Production Music) and was used sparingly in advertisements and Italian television, such as Le Iene.

=== Advertisements ===
"Frolic" has been used as background music for multiple advertisements. In 2008, "Frolic" was used in a political campaign by the Republican congressman Lee Terry. The ad, which is entitled Jim Esch Doesn't Care About Us, mocked the Democratic candidate challenging Terry. The whimsical nature of "Frolic", coupled with other images of idleness, was used to imply that Esch would not be a proactive candidate. "Frolic" was also featured in a 1990s advertisement created by a Californian bank and various European advertisements.

=== Curb Your Enthusiasm ===
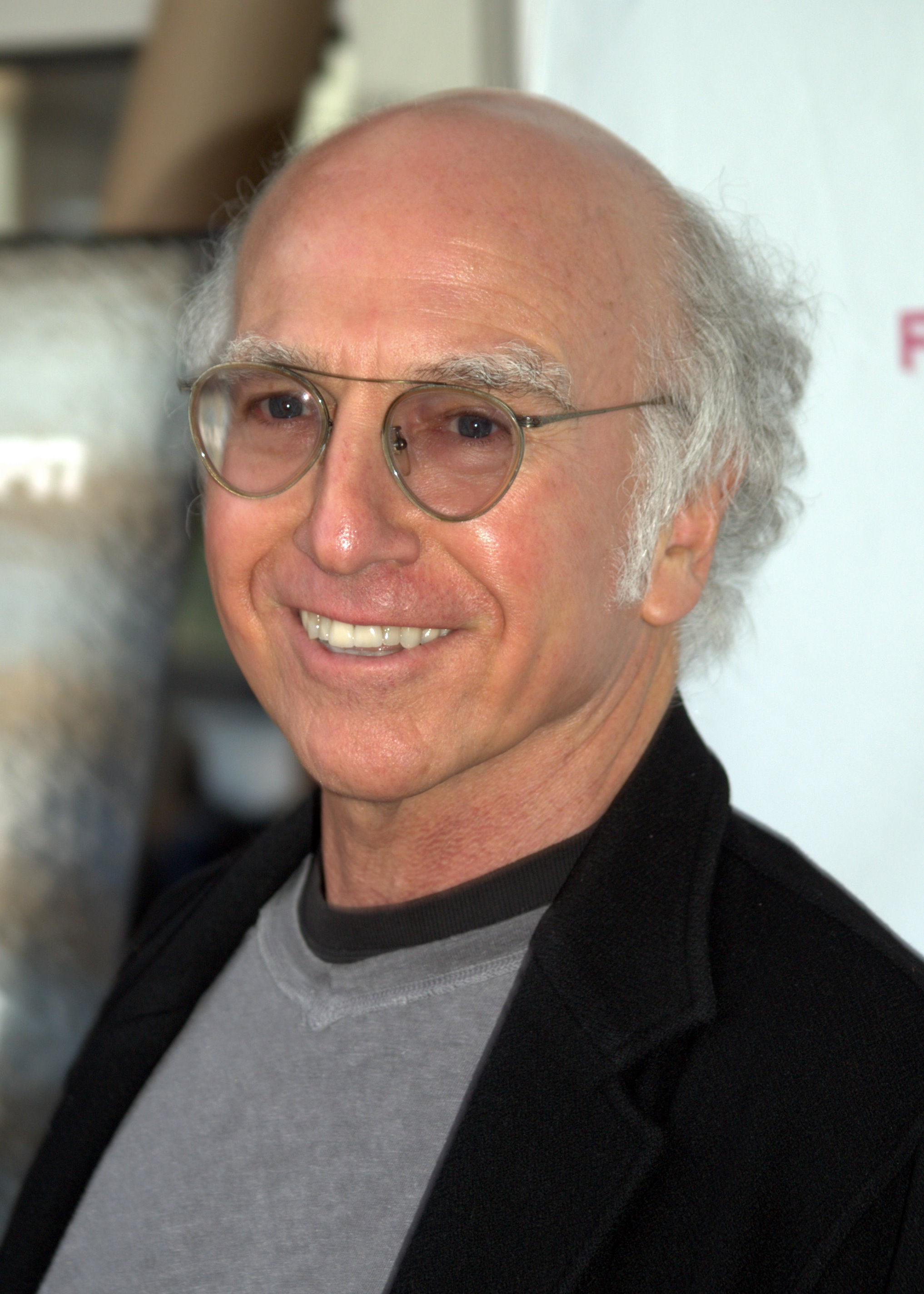
Larry David decided to use "Frolic" as the theme for Curb Your Enthusiasm after hearing it in a bank advertisement.

"Frolic" is used as the opening and closing theme song to Curb Your Enthusiasm, an American television series created by Larry David. However, the song is not listed in the show's credits. Curb Your Enthusiasm regularly uses Italian classical pieces for incidental music, with some songs originating from the same music library as "Frolic". These other songs include "The Puzzle" and "Amusement", both of which were composed by Franco Micalizzi.

David came across the song being used in the advertisement for the Californian bank. He decided to use the song for Curb Your Enthusiasm to serve as relief from the show's often exaggerated themes. David first hired a composer to recreate the song he had heard in the ad, but due to issues with quality, the synthesised recording was not used. The production team decided to find the original song instead. Michelini was contacted for his permission to use the song in 2000, almost four years after David had seen the bank advertisement. (Note: David has stated also that this happened two years prior) Michelini gave his permission and gave HBO the rights to "Frolic".

In "The Five-Foot Fence" (season 11, episode 1), "Frolic" is a part of the episode's plot. As part of the plot, Michelini has a guest appearance conducting a live orchestra at a concert. David, alongside Albert Brooks, attends the concert at the episode's end. The orchestra then plays "Frolic", signalling the end of the episode.

== Structure and music ==
"Frolic" is commonly seen as being connected to circus music. This connotation comes from the rhythms and instruments (specifically tuba and mandolin) used in the song by Michelini. Additional inspiration comes from bossa nova, which can be heard in the harmony of the song.

The song uses an unusual combination of instruments: a tuba, mandolin, piano and banjo. The tuba, which has connotations of humour and the circus, features heavily in the song's texture. Other instruments are used in the piece as effects, including slide whistle and bass drum.

The song's melody is played on a mandolin and features a downward-moving chromatic line atop various seventh chords, which also move downwards. The harmony used in "Frolic" reflects the whimsical nature of the music; according to Paul Christiansen, a musicologist specialising in music for advertisements:

[...] the melody and harmony just "spin their wheels" – that is, there is no discernible melodic or harmonic progression.

== Reception and legacy ==
The song proved successful with audiences due to its synergy with Curb Your Enthusiasm's themes and comedic nature. According to Rob LeDonne, an American writer, "Frolic" is a classic theme song and "has firmly planted itself in the pantheon of television theme song history". Steven Rasch, an editor of the ninth season of Curb Your Enthusiasm, commented on the song's usage in the show as light relief. He stated:

Music is our tool to bring the mood back up and cue the audience to laugh [...] It's this enjoyable circus track that has good energy and counterbalances the sour humor in the show.

"Frolic" is regularly included on various lists of "the best television theme songs", usually achieving somewhat high placings:

- Rotten Tomatoes: "The 21 Best TV Theme Songs of the Past 21 Years" – No. 8
- Entertainment Weekly: "The 25 best TV theme songs of the 21st century" – No. 8
- Paste: "The 50 Best TV Theme Songs of All Time" – No. 22

=== Meme culture ===
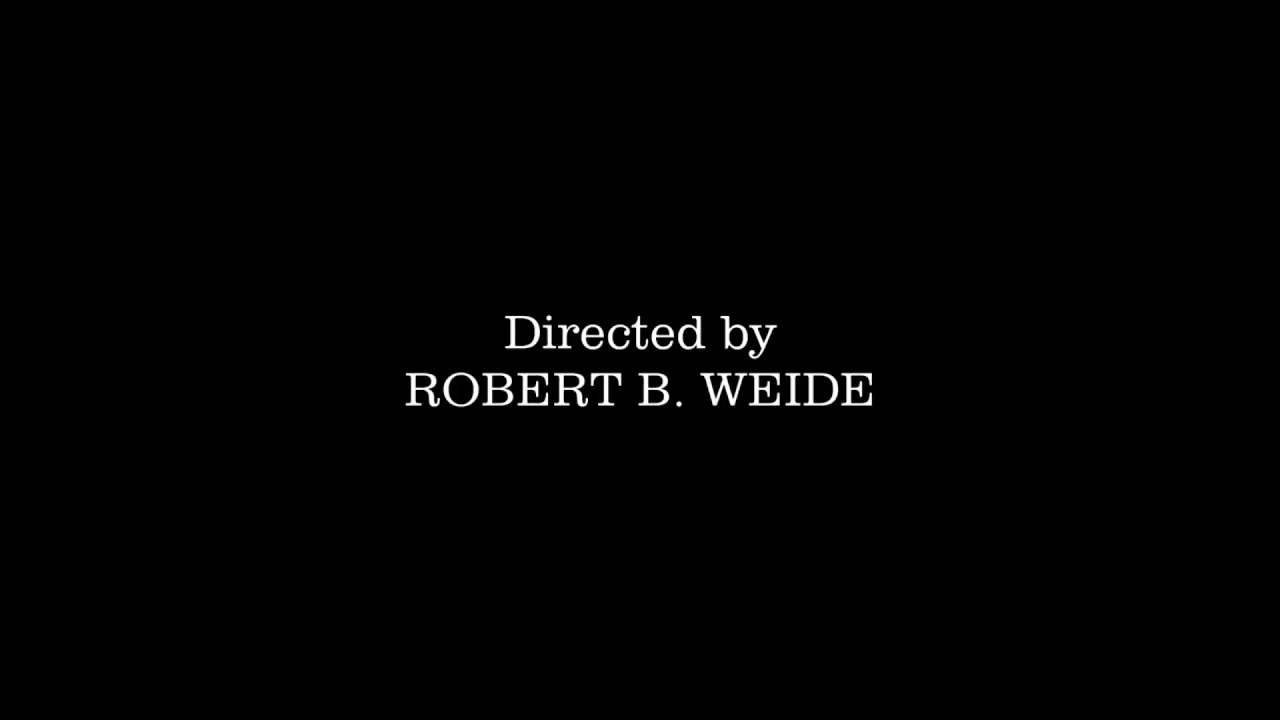
"Directed by Robert B. Weide" title card

"Frolic", along with the Curb Your Enthusiasm credit sequence starting from "Directed by Robert B. Weide", has been used as a meme to highlight awkward or embarrassing scenarios. In these memes, the song is played over short video clips, such as those of Steve Harvey announcing the wrong winner of Miss Universe 2015 or La La Land being mistakenly given the Academy Award for Best Picture in 2017. Michelini has acknowledged the song's usage in this capacity, stating that the meme "works in his favor".

The song's popularity is such that it was used as a ringtone by Steven Spielberg, who stated that the song "makes [him] smile". It has been used by Dustin Ballard in his mashup project There I Ruined It, where it was combined with Metallica's "Enter Sandman". A remix of "Frolic" produced by DJ Green Lantern was used as the backing for the Snoop Dogg song "Crip Ya Enthusiasm". The track appeared on his album, BODR.

== Notes, references and sources ==
=== Sources ===
- Burlingame, Jon (3 March 2023). Music for Prime Time. Oxford University Press. ISBN 9780190618308.
- Christiansen, Paul (10 February 2021). "From the Subliminal to the Ridiculing". The Oxford Handbook of Music and Advertising. Oxford University Press. pp. 625–642. doi:10.1093/oxfordhb/9780190691240.013.19. ISBN 9780190691240.
- Corbella, Maurizio (2020). Morricone/Nicolai: The sound dimensions of a mysterious synergy. Ennio Morricone/Bruno Nicolai, Dimensioni sonore: Musiche per l'immagine e l'immaginazione (Media notes). Translated by Daniela Travaglini. Dialogo.
- James, Daron (26 September 2017). "No Cutting Corners With Return of 'Curb'". Artisans. Variety. ISSN 0042-2738. OCLC 810134503.
- Lavery, David (18 January 2008). "Curb Your Enthusiasm". In Edgerton, Gary R.; Jones, Jeffrey P. (eds.). The Essential HBO Reader. Essential Readers in Contemporary Media and Culture. University Press of Kentucky. ISBN 9780813172651.
- Levine, Josh (2010). Pretty, Pretty, Pretty Good. ECW Press. ISBN 9781550229479.
- Rodman, Ron (Winter 2019). "Television Genre / Musical Genre / Expressive Genre". American Music. 37 (4): 435–457. doi:10.5406/americanmusic.37.4.0435. JSTOR stable/10.5406/americanmusic.37.4.0435. S2CID 208619691.
