= Long Shot (2017 film) =

2017 documentary film

- Directed by: Jacob LaMendola
- Produced by: Jacob LaMendola; Mary Beth Minthorn; Milos S. Silber; Todd Wiseman Jr.
- Starring: Tasha Boggs; Juan Catalan; Melissa Catalan
- Cinematography: Adam Newport-Berra; Gus Sacks
- Edited by: Matt Cascella; Jacob LaMendola
- Music by: Jay Wadley
- Production company: Hayden5
- Distributed by: Netflix
- Release dates: September 3, 2017 (Telluride Film Festival); September 29, 2017
- Running time: 40 minutes
- Country: United States
- Language: English

Long Shot is a 2017 American documentary film about how Juan Catalan was arrested for a murder he did not commit. A TV show, Curb Your Enthusiasm, contains raw footage that was instrumental in proving his innocence.

The documentary was released on Netflix on September 29, 2017.

== Synopsis ==
In August 2003, Juan Catalan was arrested for the murder of Martha Puebla in Los Angeles County, California. Puebla had been a witness at the hearing of gangster Mario Catalan (Juan's brother) a few days prior which he had attended. Police officers arrested him, as he fit the facial composite a witness described. He was cleared after footage from Curb Your Enthusiasm revealed that he was at a Dodgers game, and a phone call traced him to Dodger Stadium before the murder.

== Cast ==
- Tasha Boggs
- Juan Catalan
- Melissa Catalan
- Miguel Catalan
- Larry David
- Bob Einstein
- Kym Whitley
- Leslie Dunn
- Sam Fernandez
- Eric Gagne
- Robert Gajic
- Tim Gibbons
- Marcus Giles
- Todd Melnik
- Alma Oseguera
- Martin Pinner
- Juan Rodriguez
- Beth Silverman

== Release ==
It was released on September 29, 2017, on Netflix.

== Reception ==
On the review aggregator website Rotten Tomatoes, 88% of eight critics' reviews are positive, with an average rating of 8/10.
