= There I Ruined It =

Music project created by Dustin Ballard

Background information
- Genre: Parody
- Members: Dustin Ballard
- Website: www.there-i-ruined-it.com

There I Ruined It is an ongoing music project created by Dustin Ballard during the COVID-19 pandemic. Through the project, Ballard aims to “ruin” songs by making covers of them in styles very different to those of the originals. There I Ruined It distributes these covers via social media, such as TikTok, YouTube and Reddit. Since the project's beginning, Ballard has made covers of various artists, including Taylor Swift, Michael Jackson, Eminem, Dolly Parton, Radiohead and Metallica.

== Background and history ==
There I Ruined It is a musical project "with the simple goal of ruining as many beloved songs as possible before it's banned from the Internet". It was created by Dustin Ballard, a Texan musician, during the COVID-19 pandemic. The first cover he created for the project was "Shallow – Polka Edition", which is a remix of "Shallow" from A Star is Born in polka style. Most of the covers created for the project are genre-swapping remixes, although Ballard has also created song mashups. Ballard operates various accounts on social media which he uses to upload creations for There I Ruined It.

To create one of his covers, Ballard first uses MIDI-controlled VST instruments to make a cover of the song. He then dictates the song's lyrics to set down their rhythm, before recording vocals. To finish a cover, Ballard then edits the song's music video to better fit the genre of the cover.

Ballard’s covers and mashups have received recognition from popular artists such as Snoop Dogg, Charlie Puth, Paul Reubens, Jack Black, Michael Bublé, Lin-Manuel Miranda, Scott Bradlee, Avenged Sevenfold, “Weird Al” Yankovic, Questlove, and Ed Sheeran.

On 28 November 2023, Ballard announced via YouTube that all videos on the channel had been made private for 90 days due to receiving two copyright strikes from the Universal Music Group.

On 2 February 2024, his cover of "Barbie Girl" by Aqua in the style of Johnny Cash was played in a demonstration in a House Judiciary Committee hearing on artificial intelligence by Darrell Issa.

== Reception ==
Although the project's overall aim is to ruin songs, the covers released have had mixed reviews. Tim Marcin of Mashable called the covers "straight-up terrible re-imaginings of good songs" and "hilariously bad". However, Fraser Lewry of Metal Hammer commented that some covers are better than the original song, saying that "some have benefited from There I Ruined It's fiendish musical butchery". In 2024 Rapper 50 Cent responded positively to Ballard’s reinterpretation of his 2002 hit single “In da Club” as a country song under the name “Conway Fitty” (a reference to the rapper’s “Fitty” nickname and star Conway Twitty). On social media, he joked: “My country album on the way Beyoncé ain’t got shit on me LOL”, a nod to the recent album Cowboy Carter.

Graeme Boone, who is professor of musicology at Ohio State University, has commented on the covers created by Ballard. Boone stated that Ballard's covers are successful due to playing on a vulnerable point in the human psyche with emotional connections to existing songs. According to Boone, by targeting this vulnerability, the cover "can get inside you" in the same way as an earworm.

== Live Band ==
In 2024, Ballard launched There I Ruined It - Live, featuring 8 musicians performing songs from the channel. The band is based in Dallas, Texas.

== Discography ==
- "Anti Anti Hero" – mashup of "Anti-Hero" by Taylor Swift and sound effects from the Mario franchise
- "Baby" – mashup of vocal clips of celebrity musicians saying "baby" and the b word at the swear word warnings with a bonus round featuring them saying "girl"
- "Break Stuff (Limp Bizkit) – Broadway Edition" – remix of "Break Stuff" by Limp Bizkit in the style of a Broadway musical
- "Chop Suey! – Bluegrass Edition" – remix of "Chop Suey!" by System Of A Down into bluegrass style
- "Come As You Are – Swing Edition" – remix of "Come As You Are" by Nirvana into swing style
- "Curb Your Metallica" – mashup of "Frolic" by Luciano Michelini and "Enter Sandman" by Metallica
- "Creep (Radiohead) – Honky Tonk Edition" – remix of "Creep" by Radiohead into honky-tonk style
- "Enter Sandman – Kid's Edition" – remix of "Enter Sandman" by Metallica into children's music
- "Hey" – mashup of vocal clips of celebrity musicians saying "hey"
- "Lose Yourself – Super Mario Bros. Edition" – mashup of "Lose Yourself" by Eminem and sound effects from the Mario franchise
- "Party in the USSR" – cover of "Party in the U.S.A." by Miley Cyrus
- "Shallow – Polka Edition" – remix of "Shallow" by Lady Gaga and Bradley Cooper into polka style
- "The Real Slim Shady – Mardi Gras Remix" – mashup of "The Real Slim Shady" by Eminem and the jazz standard "Darktown Strutters’ Ball"
- "Yeah" – mashup of vocal clips of celebrity musicians saying "yeah" with a bonus round featuring them saying "no"

== See also ==
- SiIvaGunner – A musical parody project based mostly around bait-and-switch YouTube videos claiming to be "high quality rips" of video game music
