= Peabody Awards =

International awards for excellence in radio and television

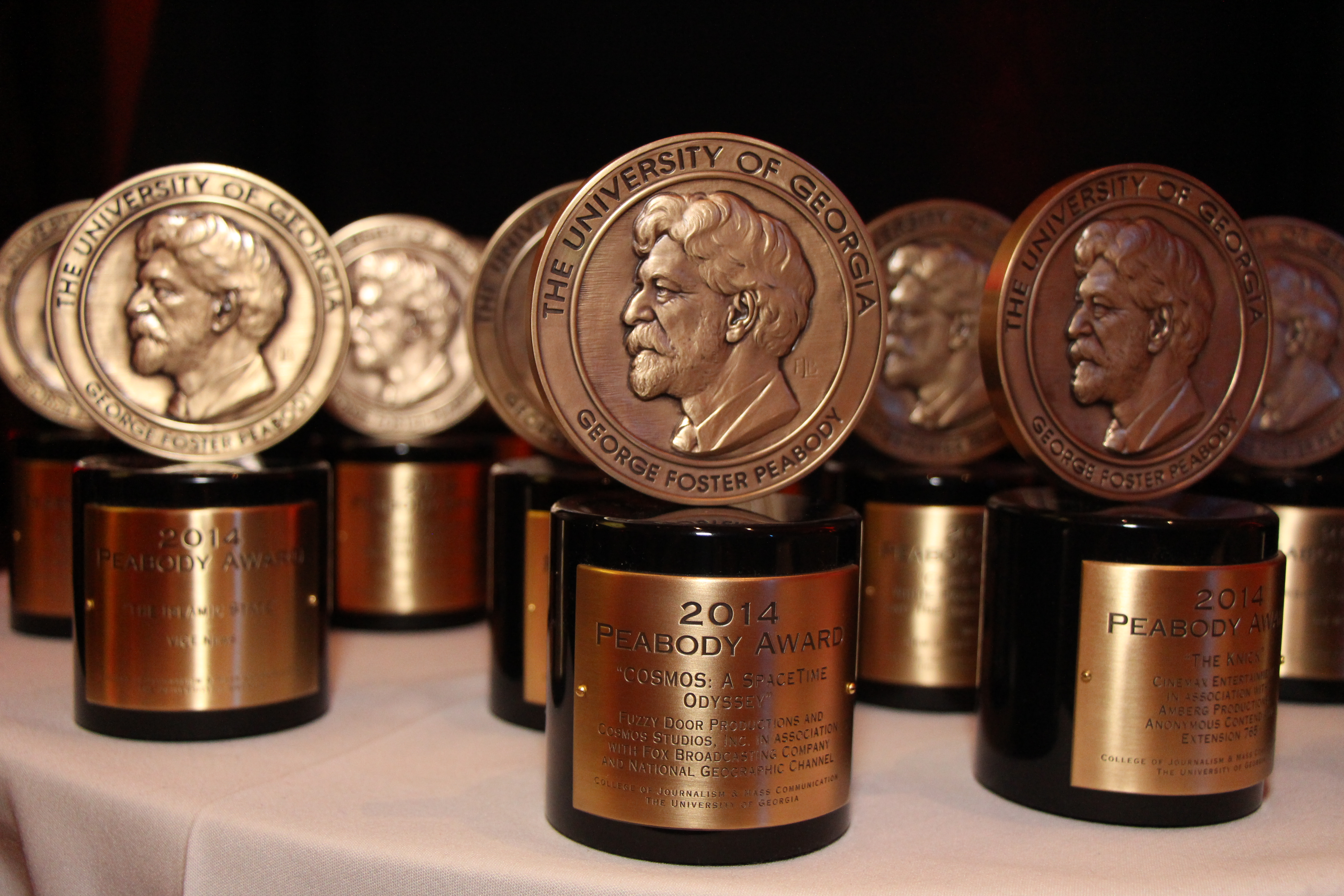
- 2014 statuettes
- Awarded for: Distinguished achievement and meritorious public service by television and radio stations, networks, producing organizations, individuals, and the World Wide Web
- Country: United States
- Presented by: Henry W. Grady College of Journalism and Mass Communication at the University of Georgia
- First award: March 29, 1941; 85 years ago
- Website: peabodyawards.com

The George Foster Peabody Awards (or simply Peabody Awards or the Peabodys) program, named for the American businessman and philanthropist George Peabody, honor what are described as the most powerful, enlightening, and invigorating stories in all of television, radio, and online media. Because of their academic affiliation and reputation for discernment, the awards are held in high esteem within the media industry.

It is the oldest major electronic media award in the United States. Established in 1940 by the National Association of Broadcasters, the Peabody Award was created to honor excellence in radio broadcasting as the radio industry's equivalent of the Pulitzer Prizes. It was later expanded to include television, and then to new media including podcasts and streaming. Final Peabody Award winners are selected unanimously by the program's Board of Jurors. Because submissions are accepted from a wide variety of sources and styles, reflecting excellence in quality storytelling rather than popularity or commercial success, the deliberations seek "Excellence On Its Own Terms".

Programs are recognized in eight categories: Entertainment, Documentary, Arts, Children's/Youth, News, Podcast/Radio, Interactive & Immersive, and Public Service. Each entry is evaluated on the achievement of standards established within its own context. Peabody Award winners include radio and television stations, networks, online media, producing organizations, and individuals from around the world.

== History ==
In 1938, the National Association of Broadcasters formed a committee to recognize outstanding achievement in radio broadcasting. Committee member Lambdin Kay, public-service director for WSB radio in Atlanta, Georgia, at the time, is credited with creating the award, named for businessman and philanthropist George Foster Peabody, who donated the funds that made the awards possible. Fellow WSB employee Lessie Smithgall introduced Lambdin to John E. Drewry, of the University of Georgia's Henry W. Grady College of Journalism and Mass Communication, who endorsed the idea. The Peabody Award was established in 1940 with the Grady College of Journalism as its permanent home.

The Peabody Awards were originally issued only for radio programming, but television awards were introduced in 1948. In the late 1990s additional categories for material distributed via the World Wide Web were added. Materials created solely for theatrical motion picture release are not eligible.

== Peabody judging ==
Close-up view of the medallion

The Peabody Awards judging process changed in 2014. Previously, more than 1,000 entries were evaluated by some 30 committees composed of a number of faculty, staff, and students from the University of Georgia and other higher education institutions across the country. Each committee was charged with screening or listening to a small number of entries and delivering written recommendations to the Peabody Board of Jurors, a ~17-member panel of scholars, critics, and media-industry professionals. Beginning in 2015, the preliminary round of judging is done by faculty members at major research universities across the United States, most of which are not at UGA. The 18-member Board of Jurors selects the nominees and winners each year. Board members discuss recommended entries as well as their own selections at three intensive preliminary meetings. The Board convenes at the University of Georgia in early April for final screenings and deliberations. Each entrant is judged on its own merit, and only unanimously selected programs receive a Peabody Award. For many years, there was no set number of awards issued. However, in 2016 the program instituted the Peabody 30, representing the best programs out of a field of 60 nominees.

== Key people ==
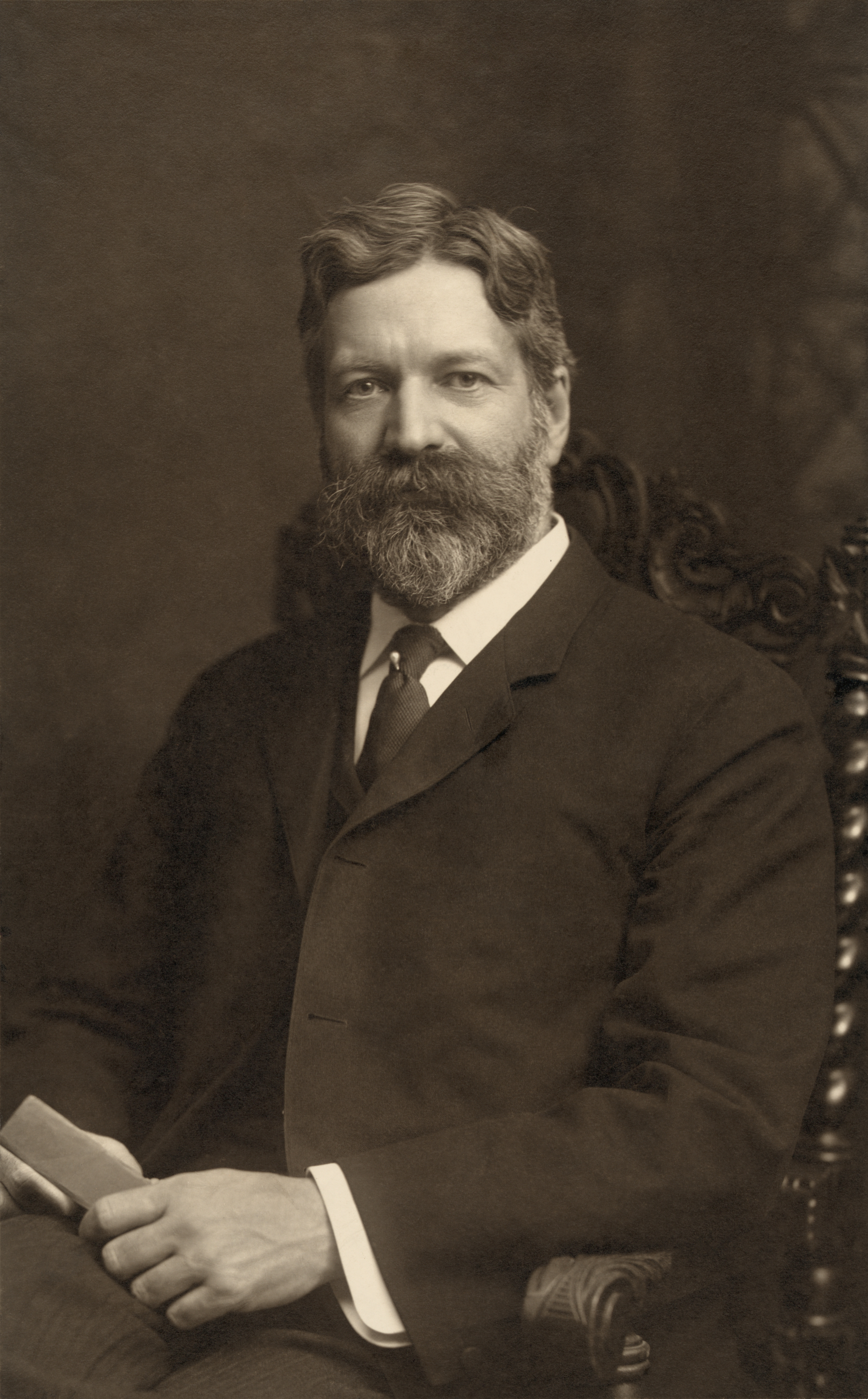
George Foster Peabody, 1907

- George Foster Peabody (1852–1938), namesake of the awards, was a highly successful investment banker who devoted much of his fortune to education and social enterprise.
- Lambdin Kay was the awards chairman for the National Association of Broadcasters when he was asked to create a prize to honor the nation's premier radio programs and performances.
- John E. Drewry (1902–1983) was the first dean of the Henry W. Grady College of Journalism and Mass Communication at the University of Georgia. He accepted the position of dean when it was created in 1940. That same year he helped Lambdin Kay, general manager of Atlanta's WSB Radio, create the Peabody Awards recognizing excellence in broadcasting.
- Worth McDougald (1926–2007) served as director of the Peabody Awards program from 1963 until his retirement in 1991.
- Barry Sherman (1952–2000) was the director of the George Foster Peabody Awards program at the University of Georgia from 1991 until his death in 2000.
- Horace Newcomb held the Lambdin Kay Chair for the Peabodys in the Grady College of Journalism and Mass Communication at the University of Georgia from 2001 to 2013.
- Jeffrey P. Jones succeeded Horace Newcomb in July 2013 as the Lambdin Kay Chair for the Peabodys in the Grady College of Journalism and Mass Communication at the University of Georgia.

== Award announcements and ceremonies ==
Each spring, the Peabody Awards Board of Jurors announces award recipients for work released during the previous year. Traditionally, the winners' announcements have been made via a simple press release and/or a press conference. An April 2014 segment of CBS This Morning included an announcement of 2013 Peabody winners. In April 2015, the 2014 Peabodys were revealed over an 8-day period, with the entertainment-based recipients revealed on ABC's Good Morning America.

The formal presentation of the Peabody Awards is traditionally held in late May or early June. The awards were given during a luncheon in New York City for many years. The ceremony moved to a red carpet evening event for the first time on May 31, 2015, with Fred Armisen serving as host. Several famous names have served as Peabody Awards ceremony hosts over the years, among them Walter Cronkite, Lesley Stahl, Jackie Gleason, Jon Stewart, Morley Safer, Craig Ferguson, Larry King, and Ira Glass. From 2014 to 2016, the Peabody Awards aired on a tape-delayed basis on the TV channel Pivot. On June 2, 2017, a television special of the 76th Peabody Awards aired on PBS and Fusion.

== Brown Media Archives & Peabody Awards Collection ==
The Peabody Awards Collection is the flagship of The Walter J. Brown Media Archives & Peabody Awards Collection. The archives are housed in the Richard B. Russell Building Special Collections Libraries on the north campus of The University of Georgia. The mission of the Peabody Archive is to preserve, protect, and provide access to the moving image and sound materials that reflect the collective memory of broadcasting and the history of the state of Georgia and its people. The collection contains nearly every entry for the first major broadcast award given in the United States. Entries began in 1940 for radio and 1948 for television, and at least 1,000 new entries are received every year—programs created by local, national, and international producers. The collection provides a cultural cross-section of television from its infancy to the present day, featuring news, documentary, entertainment, educational, and children's programming. Once judging is complete, all entries are moved to the Main Library for in-depth cataloging, access, and long-term preservation.

In 2017 the Walter J. Brown Media Archives & Peabody Awards Collection at the University of Georgia (BMA) and WGBH, on behalf of the American Archive of Public Broadcasting, were awarded a grant from the National Historical Publications and Records Commission to digitize, preserve, and provide access to approximately 4,000 hours of public broadcasting programming nominated for a George Foster Peabody Award between 1941 and 1999. The full collection will eventually comprise 4,000 digitized hours of audio and video recordings from 230 local, state, and regional public broadcasting stations in 46 states as well as Puerto Rico and the District of Columbia.

== See also ==
- List of American television awards
- List of Peabody Award winners (1940–1949)
- List of Peabody Award winners (1950–1959)
- List of Peabody Award winners (1960–1969)
- List of Peabody Award winners (1970–1979)
- List of Peabody Award winners (1980–1989)
- List of Peabody Award winners (1990–1999)
- List of Peabody Award winners (2000–2009)
- List of Peabody Award winners (2010–2019)
- List of Peabody Award winners (2020–2029)
