= Todd Wiseman Jr. =

American filmmaker and entrepreneur

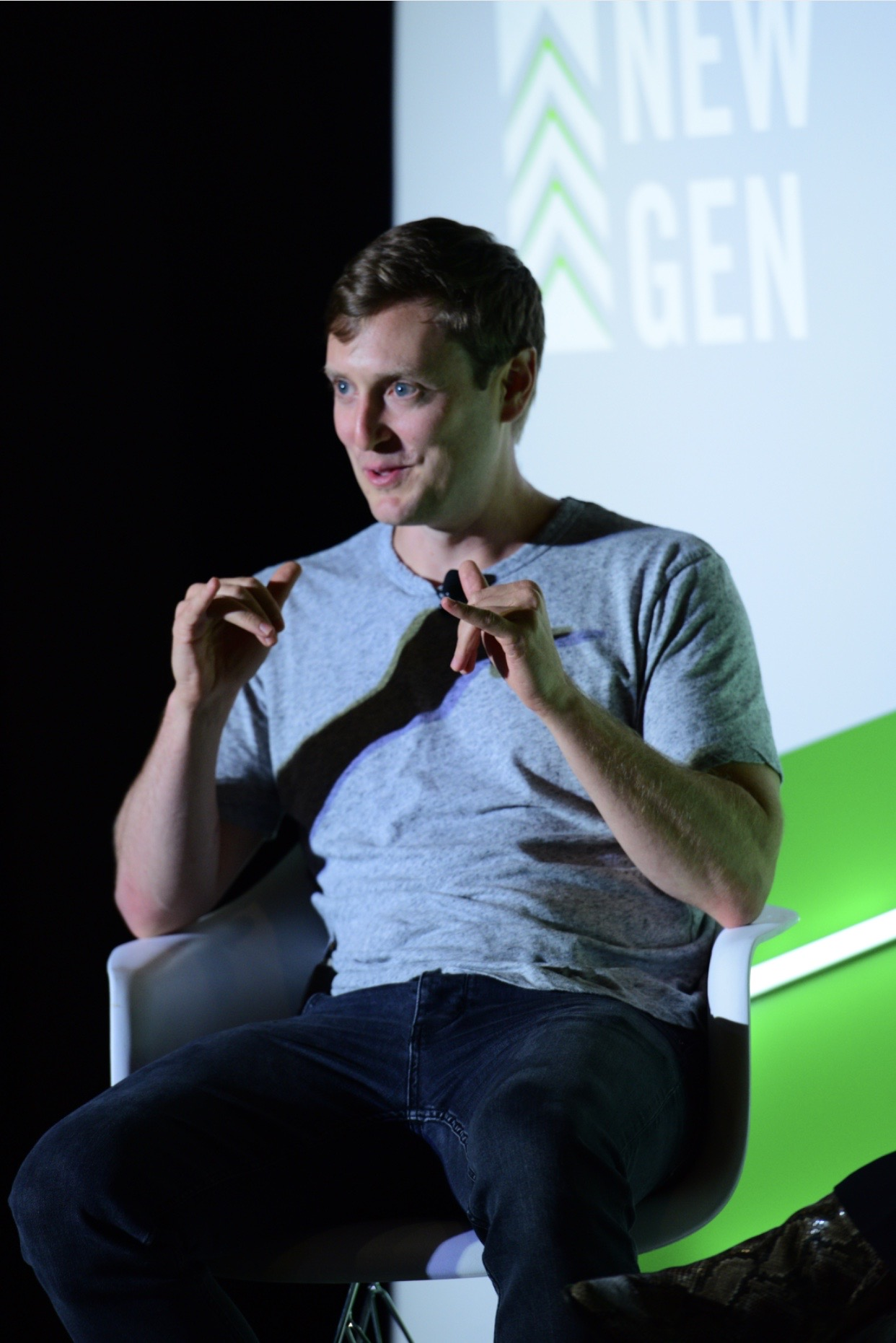
- Wiseman speaking at Advertising Week in New York City, 2019.
- Born: July 15, 1987 (age 39); Hollywood, Florida, U.S.
- Education: New York University (BA)
- Occupations: Filmmaker and Co-Founder of Hayden5
- Years active: 2006–2023

Todd Wiseman Jr. (born July 15, 1987) is an American filmmaker and film producer. He directed the feature film The School Duel, which premiered at the Deauville American Film Festival in 2024. Wiseman is the co-founder of Hayden5, and has worked in commercial and narrative film production.

== Early life ==
Wiseman was born in Hollywood, Florida, the son of Todd Alan Wiseman, a television executive and inventor, and Robin (née Rollins), a school teacher. In 2005, Wiseman enrolled in New York University's Tisch School of the Arts; he received his Bachelor of Arts in Film and Television in 2009.

== Career ==
Wiseman wrote, directed, and produced the sci-fi short film, The Exit Room starring Christopher Abbott, about a journalist who faces government execution during a future American Revolution. It was later nominated for Best Narrative Short at the Tribeca Film Festival in 2013.

In 2015, Wiseman helped produce the American drama film, Knucklehead, starring Gbenga Akinnagbe, Alfre Woodard, and Amari Cheatom. The film earned recognition at the American Black Film Festival.

Long Shot is a Netflix short documentary produced by Wiseman, which was released in 2017 and features Larry David. Long Shot earned several film nominations, including an Emmy Nomination for Best Short Film.

Lightningface, a short film starring Oscar Isaac, premiered in 2016 and was produced by Wiseman. The film debuted on Vimeo.

=== Hayden5 ===
Wiseman co-founded the production company Hayden5 with Milos Silber in 2009. Wiseman left the company in the summer of 2023.
