= SiIvaGunner =

Comedic video game music collective

- SiIvaGunner's main YouTube icon, (Note: The channel's profile picture changes regularly based on channel events.) an edited picture (Note: The original picture) of a bust of Antinous
- Other name: GiIvaSunner (formerly)

YouTube information
- Channels: SiIvaGunner; SiIvaGunner2
- Years active: 2016–present
- Genres: Video game music, parody music, mashup, remix
- Subscribers: 727 thousand (SiIvaGunner); 42.2 thousand (SiIvaGunner2)
- Views: 1.55 billion (SiIvaGunner); 378.7 thousand (SiIvaGunner2)
- Last updated: July 1, 2026

SiIvaGunner (Note: Stylized with the third letter being an uppercase "i", not a lowercase "L".) (/ˈsiːvəˌɡʌnər/ SEE-və GUN-ər), formerly GiIvaSunner (/ˈɡiːvəˌsʌnər/ GEE-və SUN-ər), is a comedic musical collective based mostly around bait-and-switch YouTube videos claiming to be "high quality rips" of video game music that are in reality remixes, parodies, and/or mashups, often incorporating internet memes and popular music.

== Content ==
Athletic Theme (PAL Version) - Super Mario World
An excerpt from a SiIvaGunner parody "rip" of Super Mario World's "Athletic Theme". In this parody, the melody of the song is replaced by Ross Bagdasarian's song "Witch Doctor", making light of the similarity of the two melodies.

The SiIvaGunner channel uploads videos in the style of many other video game soundtrack-based YouTube channels; the channel's videos are typically static images, usually of the relevant game's logo, box art or title screen, with a piece of music playing over it, though they may contain visuals such as GIFs, different images or clips from other videos appearing. Such videos are intentionally misleading as to trick the viewer into believing they are actual songs from a game's soundtrack. The uploaded songs, however, are instead remixes, mashups, covers, or simple editing jokes. Internet memes and other channel-specific running gags are often incorporated into the rips, including "Meet the Flintstones", 7 Grand Dad, The Nutshack, Love Live!'s "Snow Halation", Kirby: Planet Robobot, and LazyTown's "We Are Number One".

The SiIvaGunner collective is strictly non-commercial and the artists involved do not monetize their music. The channel was originally presented as being run by a mysterious artist, but over time the collective has become more open about its true nature as a group of artists. Despite this, the channel continues to have a policy of crediting music collectively rather than to the individual member artists.

The channel features complex internal lore and backstory within its music. A long-running web-series, called the SiIvaGunner Christmas Comeback Crisis, has taken several years to conclude and includes many characters from other franchises. The King for a Day series featured characters competing in a bracket tournament, with the winner hosting the channel for a day. An original character named the Joke-Explainer™ 7000 serves as the channel's mascot, appearing as a robotic version of Smol Nozomi [sic], a chibi version of the character Nozomi Tojo from the Love Live! franchise. She occasionally appears in the comment sections of the channel's videos, explaining the jokes within.

== History ==
An unrelated YouTube channel named GilvaSunner (spelled normally, with a lowercase "L") was created in 2010 that uploaded video game music (VGM), mostly from Nintendo games. The channel remained active until it was deleted by its creators in 2022 due to YouTube copyright strikes.

On January 9, 2016, a YouTube channel parodying the GilvaSunner channel was created by Chaze the Chat, but with a capital "i" used in place of a lowercase "L" (with the effect of making the channel names appear identical). The channel was terminated for impersonation and rebooted in April 2016, taking the new name SiIvaGunner (still using a capital "i" in place of a lowercase "L").

From 2018 onwards, SiIvaGunner started presenting as guests at MAGFest. Initially starting with Q&A panels, the channel's involvement with MAGFest eventually expanded to include game show panels, meet & greets, official merch, and specially made DJ showcases for the main stage.

In 2018, The Daily Dot attributed the popularity of internet meme "Yoshi Commits Tax Fraud" to the channel, which uploaded soundtracks purportedly belonging to an entirely fictitious "Yoshi Commits Tax Fraud" video game.

In late 2019, the art gallery Gallery Aferro featured an exhibit titled "Elevator Music 6: SiIvaGunner", curated by Juno Zago. An auditory exhibit, it was a collection of SiIvaGunner remixes of classic and new video game music played inside an early-1900s refurbished Otis elevator.

== See also ==
- There I Ruined It – A musical parody project by Dustin Ballard dedicated to satirical covers, mashups, and "ruined" versions of popular songs
