= Hudson Meek =

American actor (2008–2024)

- Born: Hudson Joseph Meek; August 5, 2008; Birmingham, Alabama, U.S.
- Died: December 21, 2024 (aged 16); Birmingham, Alabama, U.S.
- Occupation: Actor
- Years active: 2014–2024

Hudson Joseph Meek (August 5, 2008 – December 21, 2024) was an American child actor, known for his role as young Baby in the 2017 film Baby Driver.

== Life and career ==
Meek was born on August 5, 2008, to Derek Meek and Lani Wells where he lived in the Birmingham suburb of Vestavia Hills. He and his brother began acting at an early age. He was a Baptist.

In 2014, he briefly appeared in the Lifetime film The Santa Con. He later appeared in episodes of the MacGyver reboot, and as young Baby in Baby Driver (2017). He also acted in Found (2023) and The School Duel (2024). He was cast as Chris Piper in the film 90 Minutes in Heaven (2015).

== Death ==
On December 19, 2024, Meek fell from a vehicle traveling in Vestavia Hills and was taken to UAB Hospital, where he died from his injuries on December 21, at the age of 16. The End of Oak Street and The School Duel which he had filmed prior to his death, were dedicated to his memory.

Following his death, The Hudson J. Meek Memorial Scholarship was established and will be awarded annually to a Vestavia Hills High School student.

== Filmography ==
Film
Year	Title	Role	Notes
2015	90 Minutes in Heaven	Chris Piper	
2017	Baby Driver	Young Baby	
2024	The School Duel	Sirius	
2026	The End of Oak Street	Kaden Tucker	Posthumous release

Television
Year	Title	Role	Notes
2018	MacGyver	Son	Episode: "Dia de los Muertos + Sicarios + Family"
2022	Legacies	Tiberius	Episode: "Was This the Monster You Saw?"
2023	Found	Teenage Sir	Episode: "Missing While Scamming"
2024	Genius	Arnold	Episode: "MLK/X: Graduation"
