= The School Duel =

American science fiction film

- Alternative film poster.
- Directed by: Todd Wiseman Jr.
- Written by: Todd Wiseman Jr.
- Produced by: Christa Boarini; Todd Wiseman Jr. Bobby Marinelli; Bryan Gaynor
- Starring: Kue Lawrence; Oscar Nuñez
- Cinematography: Kyle Deitz
- Edited by: Bryan Gaynor
- Music by: Trevor Gureckis
- Release dates: June 9, 2024 (Deauville American Film Festival); April 24, 2026 (United States)
- Running time: 90 minutes
- Country: United States
- Language: English

The School Duel is a 2024 American science fiction drama thriller film written and directed by Todd Wiseman Jr. The film is Wiseman Jr's debut feature film, as well as Hudson Meek’s final acting role.

== Premise ==
The School Duel is based in a near-future Florida where gun control in the state has been abolished. Florida’s governor, played by Oscar Nuñez of The Office, introduces a state-wide, televised fight-to-the-death competition known as "The School Duel," which acts as his solution to school shootings. In hopes of notoriety, Sammy, a troubled 13-year-old boy, secretly enlists against his mother's wishes.

== Cast ==
- Kue Lawrence as Samuel Miller
- Christina Brucato as Beth Miller
- Oscar Nuñez as Governor Anthony 'The Ram' Ramiro
- Jamad Mays as Coach Williams
- Michael Sean Tighe as Captain Stegmann
- Eugenie Bondurant as Principal Wigton
- Hudson Meek as Sirius
- Clayton Royal Johnson as James

== Production ==
Todd Wiseman Jr. directing actor Kue Lawrence on set of The School Duel.

In October 2025, it was announced that Tim Blake Nelson would executive produceratifize The School Duel along with previously announced Jonathan Gray and Drake Sutton-Shearer.

Filming took place around the Tampa Bay, St. Petersburg, and Orlando areas of Florida in 2024.

== Release ==
The film debuted in competition at the 50th Deauville American Film Festival in France on September 6, 2024, where director Wiseman Jr was nominated for Grand Special Prize, and the film won Canal+ Special 50th Anniversary Jury Prize. It screened abroad at Night Visions Film Festival in Finland, Fantaspoa Film Festival in Brazil, Fantasia International Film Festival in Canada. It won Best Film at Terra di Siena in Italy and Best Director at Dark Nights Film Fest in Australia.

It appeared at Miami Film Festival in 2024, where Wiseman Jr was nominated for the Jordan Ressler First Feature Award. The School Duel won Best Film, Best Director, and Best Screenplay at Sunscreen Film Festival 2025. It also screened in the United States at Florida Film Festival.

In October 2025, it was announced that Altered Innocence would distribute The School Duel in North America.

The School Duel opens in select theaters in the United States on Friday, April 24, 2026.

The original motion picture soundtrack composed by Trevor Gureckis and was released digitally by Lakeshore Records on April 24, 2026. The score incorporates significant sound design in the midst of its industrial tone, as the composer noted it relied on "the actual sound of guns – reloading, firing, clicking – slowed down by hundreds of times, giving them an almost breathing quality, a constant undercurrent" as audio analog to the proliferation of guns in society.

== Reception ==
After its Canadian premiere at Fantasia International Film Festival in 2025, ScreenAnarchy said The School Duel was "stripped-down and raw, like you’re watching something that actually happened — or could happen — rather than a piece of fiction" FilmBook said it was "frightening, haunting and powerful and should be seen."

On the review aggregator website Rotten Tomatoes, 85% of 13 critics' reviews are positive.
