= Curb Your Enthusiasm =

American television sitcom (2000–2024)

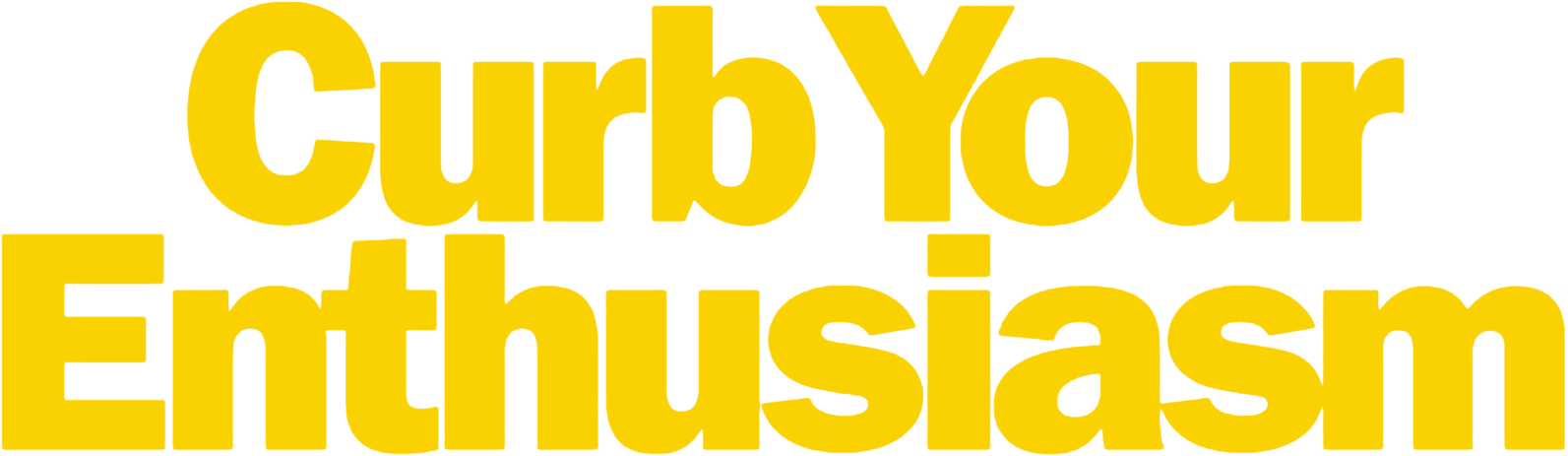
- Genre: Sitcom; Improvisational comedy; Comedy of manners; Cringe comedy; Black comedy
- Created by: Larry David
- Starring: Larry David; Jeff Garlin; Cheryl Hines; Susie Essman; J. B. Smoove
- Theme music composer: Luciano Michelini
- Opening theme: "Frolic"
- Country of origin: United States
- Original language: English
- No. of seasons: 12
- No. of episodes: 120 (and 1 special) (list of episodes)

Production
- Executive producers: Larry David; Jeff Garlin; Robert B. Weide; Alec Berg; David Mandel; Jeff Schaffer; Larry Charles; Gavin Polone; Tim Gibbons; Erin O'Malley
- Production locations: Los Angeles; New York City
- Camera setup: Single-camera
- Running time: 26–59 minutes
- Production companies: HBO Entertainment; Production Partners

Original release
- Network: HBO
- Release: October 15, 2000 – April 7, 2024

Related
- Seinfeld

Curb Your Enthusiasm, also known colloquially as Curb, is an American comedy television series created by Larry David that premiered on HBO with an hour-long special on October 17, 1999, followed by 12 seasons broadcast from 2000 to 2024. David stars as a fictionalized version of himself and the show follows his life as a semi-retired television writer and producer in Los Angeles and, for one season each, New York City and Atlanta. Also starring are Cheryl Hines as his wife Cheryl, Jeff Garlin as his manager and best friend Jeff Greene, Susie Essman as Jeff's wife Susie, and J. B. Smoove as Larry's housemate Leon Black. It often features celebrity guest stars, many of them playing fictionalized versions of themselves, including Ted Danson, Richard Lewis, Wanda Sykes, Rosie O'Donnell, and Jon Hamm.

The sitcom was developed from a 1999 one-hour special, Larry David: Curb Your Enthusiasm, which David and HBO originally envisioned as a one-time project. It was shot as a mockumentary, in which the characters were aware of the presence of cameras and a crew. The series, while not in documentary form, was shot in a somewhat similar cinéma vérité-like style. As with Seinfeld, which David co-created, the humor of Curb Your Enthusiasm often revolves around the minutiae of everyday social life. Each episode's plot and subplot is established in an outline written by David, and the actors largely improvise the dialogue.

Curb Your Enthusiasm received high critical acclaim and has grown in popularity since its debut. Many publications have called it one of the greatest comedy series of the 21st century and of all time. It was nominated for 55 Primetime Emmy Awards, including Outstanding Comedy Series for 11 of its 12 seasons. It won the 2002 Golden Globe Award for Best Television Series – Musical or Comedy. It aired for eight mostly consecutive seasons until 2011, and resumed with a ninth season in 2017. The tenth season aired in 2020 and the eleventh in 2021. The series was renewed for a twelfth and final season that premiered on February 4, 2024, and the series finale aired on April 7, 2024.

== Premise ==
Larry David has explained the show's name in TV interviews as reflecting his perception that many people seem to live their lives projecting false enthusiasm, which he believes is used to imply that "they are better than you". This conflicts with his dry style. The title also urges the audience not to expect too much from the show; at the time of the premiere, David wanted to lower expectations after his earlier success in the entertainment industry.

The series stars David as a fictionalized version of himself. Like the real-life David, the character is well known as a co-creator and main co-writer of the sitcom Seinfeld. Although Larry maintains an office, he is rarely shown working. Episodes frequently center on his ignorance of—or disregard for—well-established social conventions and expectations, and his insistence that others adhere to rules of which only he seems to be aware. This social ineptitude, combined with an inability to let even the most minor grievance or annoyance go unexpressed, often leads him into awkward social situations and draws the ire of his friends, family, and total strangers. He is also routinely the victim of labyrinthine misunderstandings wherein people think he has done something immoral or distasteful.

For the first half of the series, David is living a married, child-free life in Los Angeles with his wife, Cheryl (Cheryl Hines). His main confidant on the show is his manager and friend Jeff Greene (Jeff Garlin). Susie Essman plays Susie Greene, Jeff's short-tempered wife, who is frequently at odds with Larry. Many of the show's frequent guest stars are celebrities and public figures, who usually play fictionalized versions of themselves. Among the more frequently recurring guest stars are Larry's longtime friend Richard Lewis as well as Ted Danson and his wife Mary Steenburgen.

The show is set and filmed in various affluent Westside communities of (and occasionally in downtown) Los Angeles, as well as in the adjacent cities of Beverly Hills, Culver City, and Santa Monica. David's hometown of New York City is featured in some of season 8.

== Episodes ==
Curb Your Enthusiasm premiered with an hour-long special on October 17, 1999, upon which the series was based. The series' first eight seasons aired from 2000 to 2011. The series took a prolonged hiatus before returning for a ninth season in 2017, a tenth in 2020, and an eleventh in 2021. It was renewed for a twelfth season in August 2022, which was confirmed to be the final season in December 2023. The final season premiered on February 4, 2024.

The episodes are typically named after an event, object, or person that figures prominently in the plot, much as Seinfeld episodes were titled. Unrelated events woven throughout an episode are tied into a climax that resolves the story lines simultaneously, to Larry's advantage or detriment. Each episode has a distinct plot, but most seasons feature a story arc that extends across several episodes and culminates in a finale that often features the return of many of the characters who appeared throughout the season.

Season	Episodes	Originally released	
Season	Episodes	First released	Last released
Pilot	1	October 17, 1999	
1	10	October 15, 2000	December 17, 2000
2	10	September 23, 2001	November 25, 2001
3	10	September 15, 2002	November 17, 2002
4	10	January 4, 2004	March 14, 2004
5	10	September 25, 2005	December 4, 2005
6	10	September 9, 2007	November 11, 2007
7	10	September 20, 2009	November 22, 2009
8	10	July 10, 2011	September 11, 2011
9	10	October 1, 2017	December 3, 2017
10	10	January 19, 2020	March 22, 2020
11	10	October 24, 2021	December 26, 2021
12	10	February 4, 2024	April 7, 2024

== Characters ==
=== Main cast ===
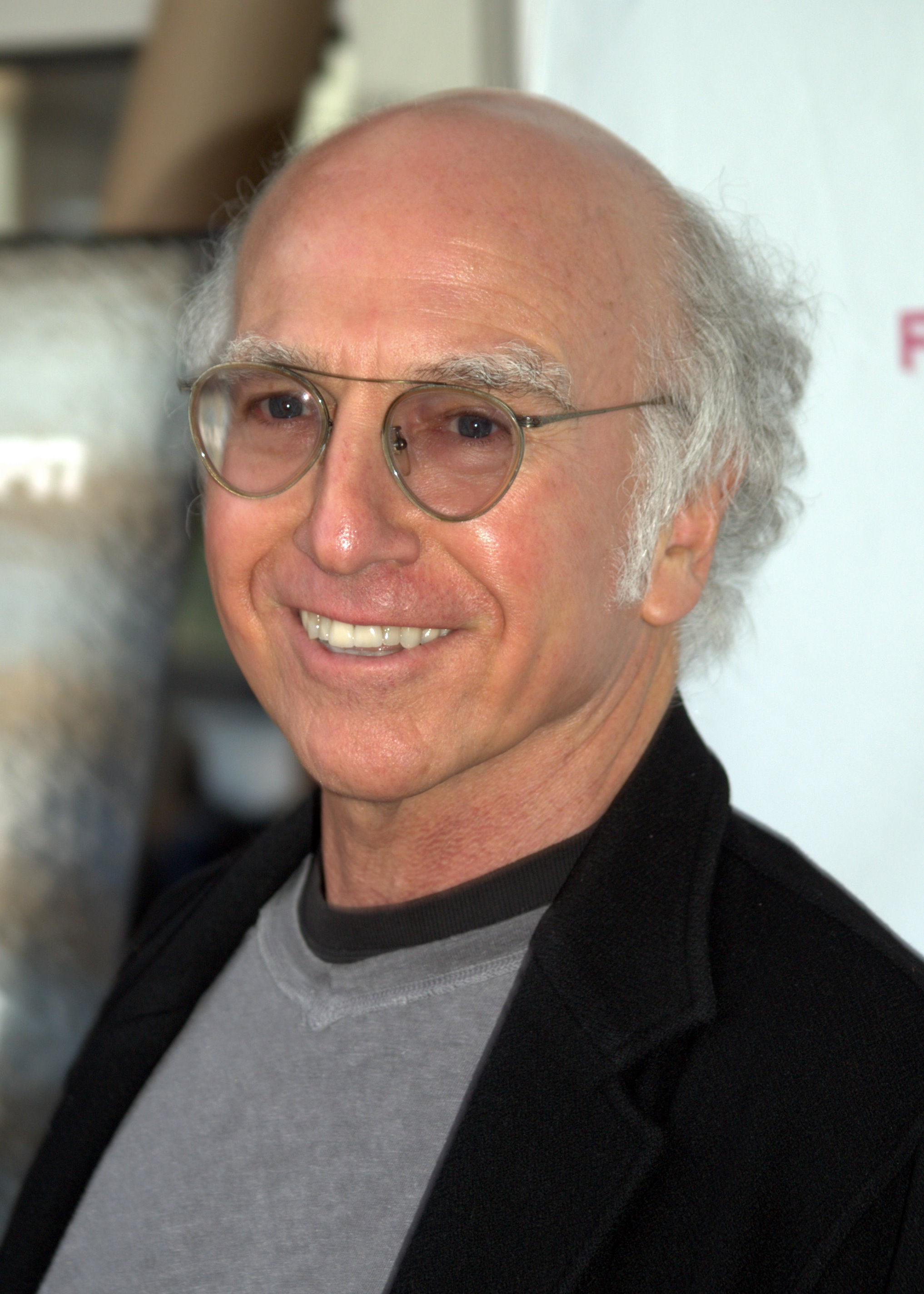
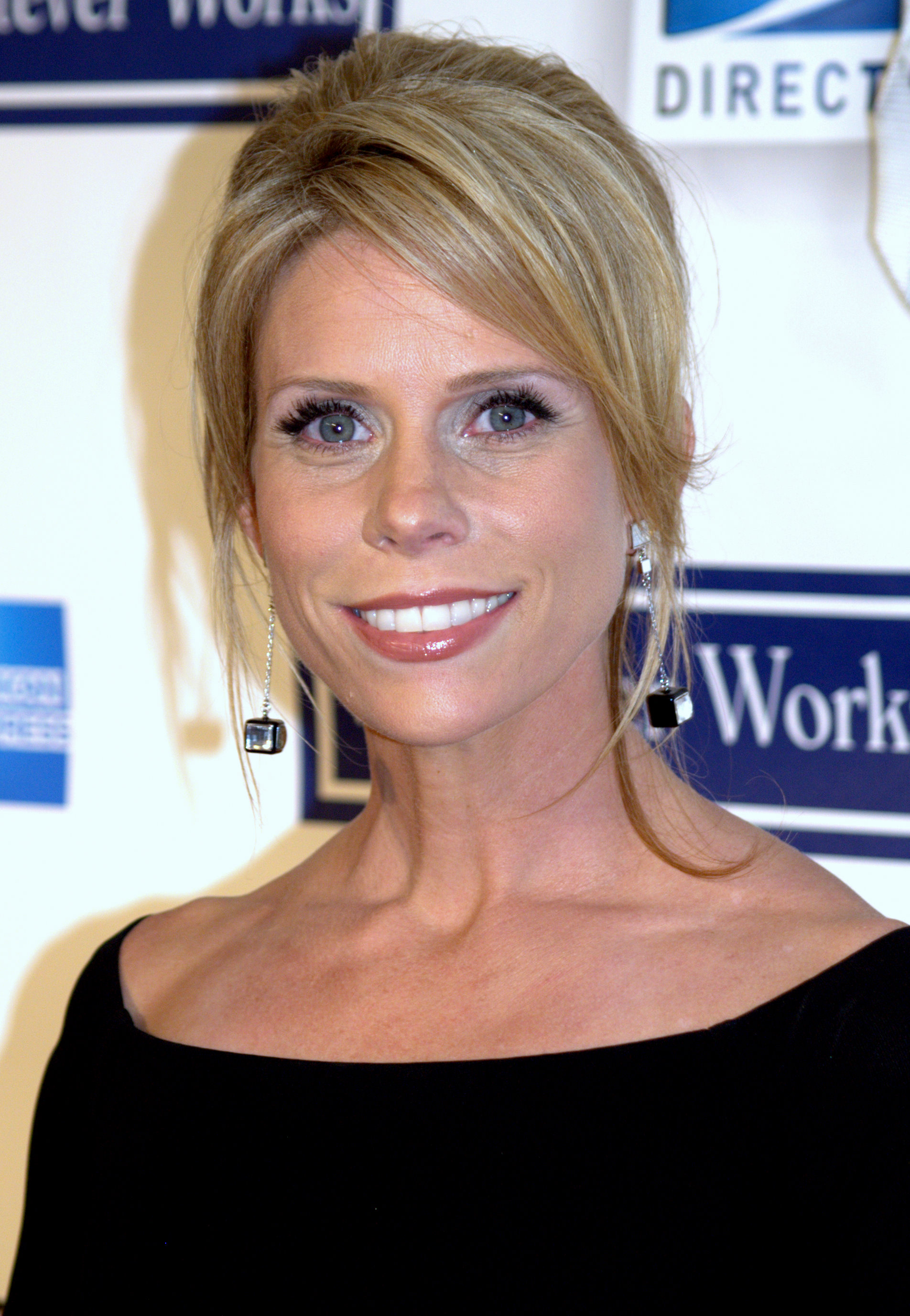
Creator Larry David (left) stars as a fictional version of himself; he also writes the story outline for each episode. Cheryl Hines (right) portrays Larry's wife in the show. Hines also directed one episode of the show (in the tenth season).
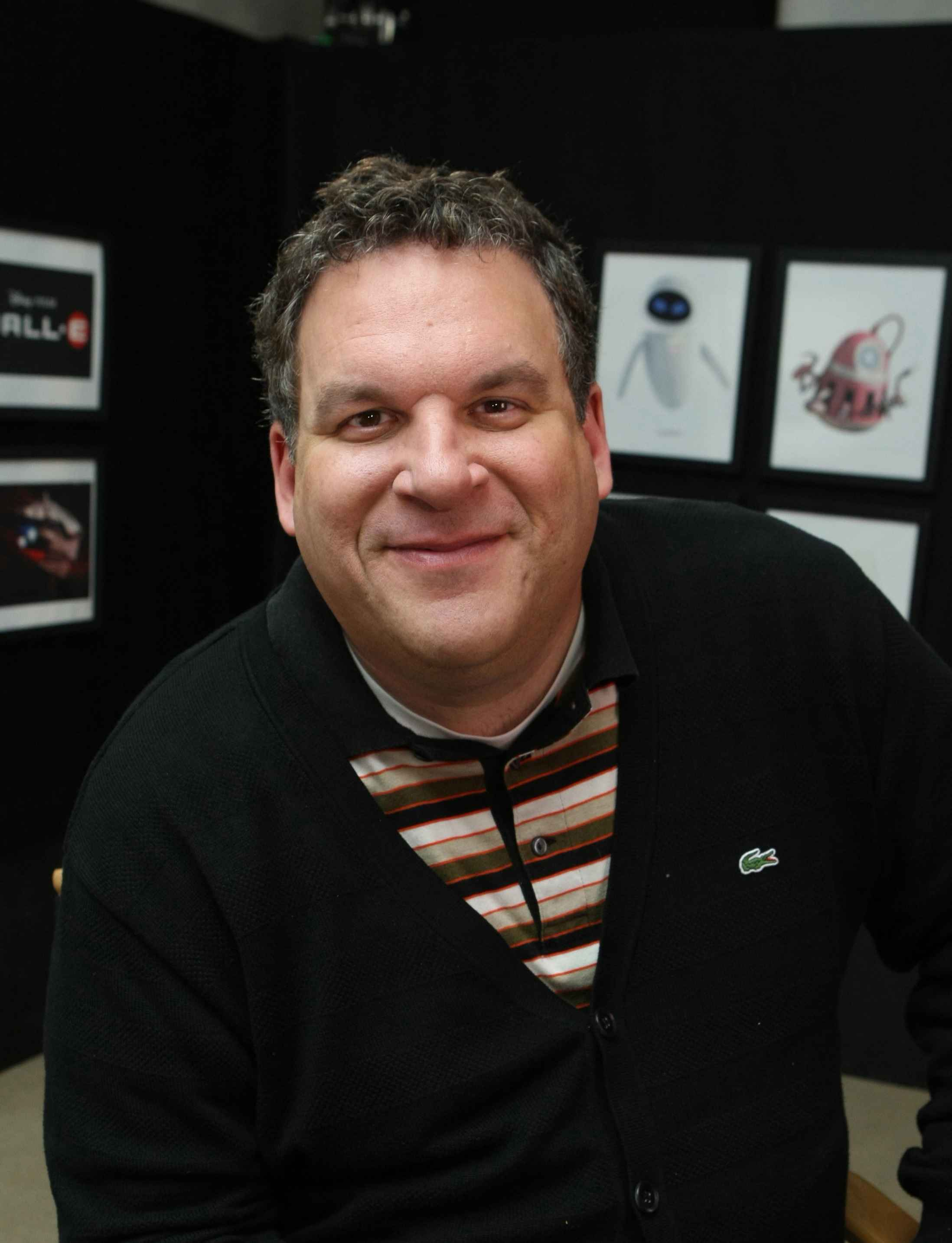
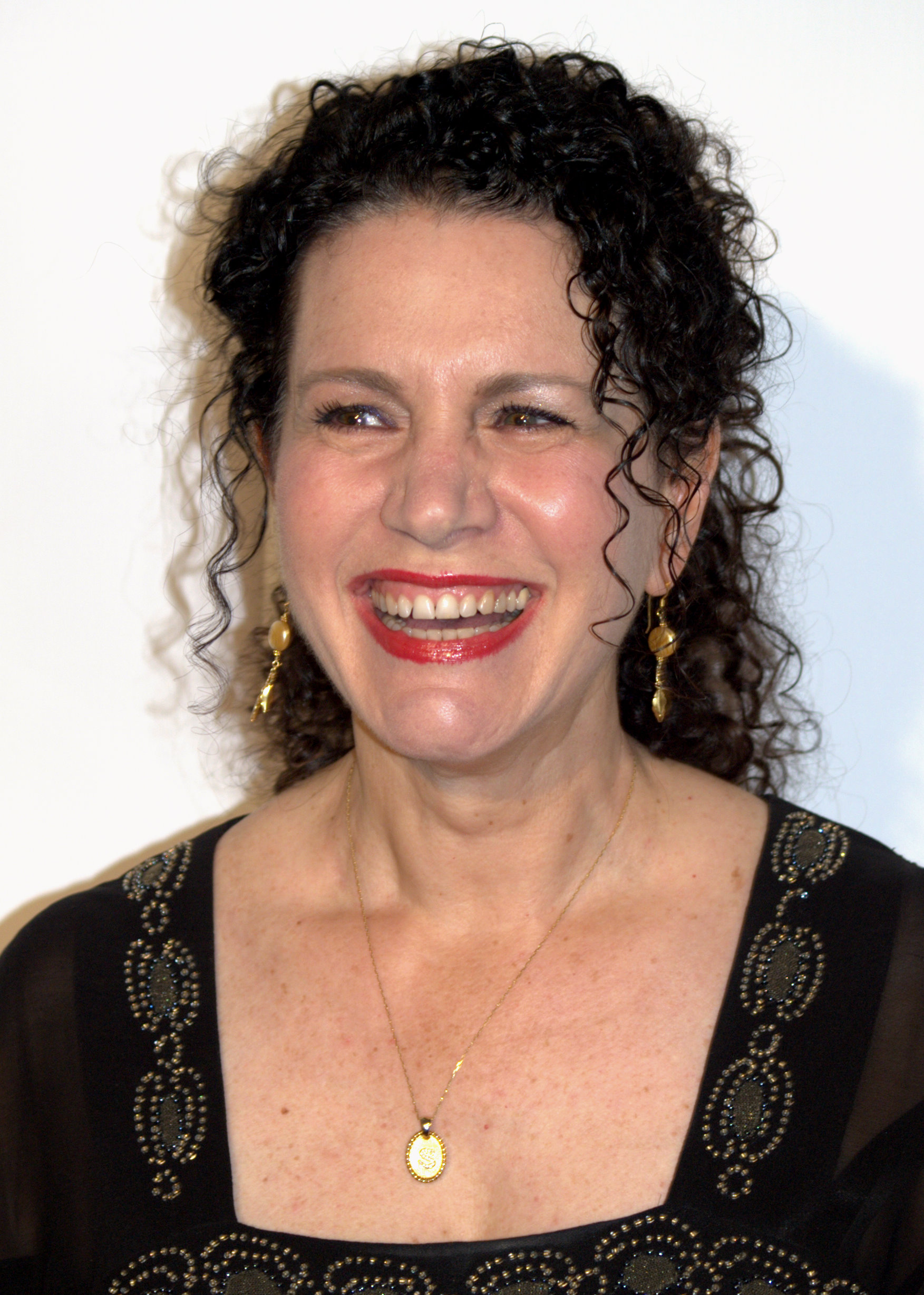
Jeff Greene is portrayed by Jeff Garlin (left), who is also an executive producer and has directed an episode. Greene's wife is portrayed by Susie Essman (right).

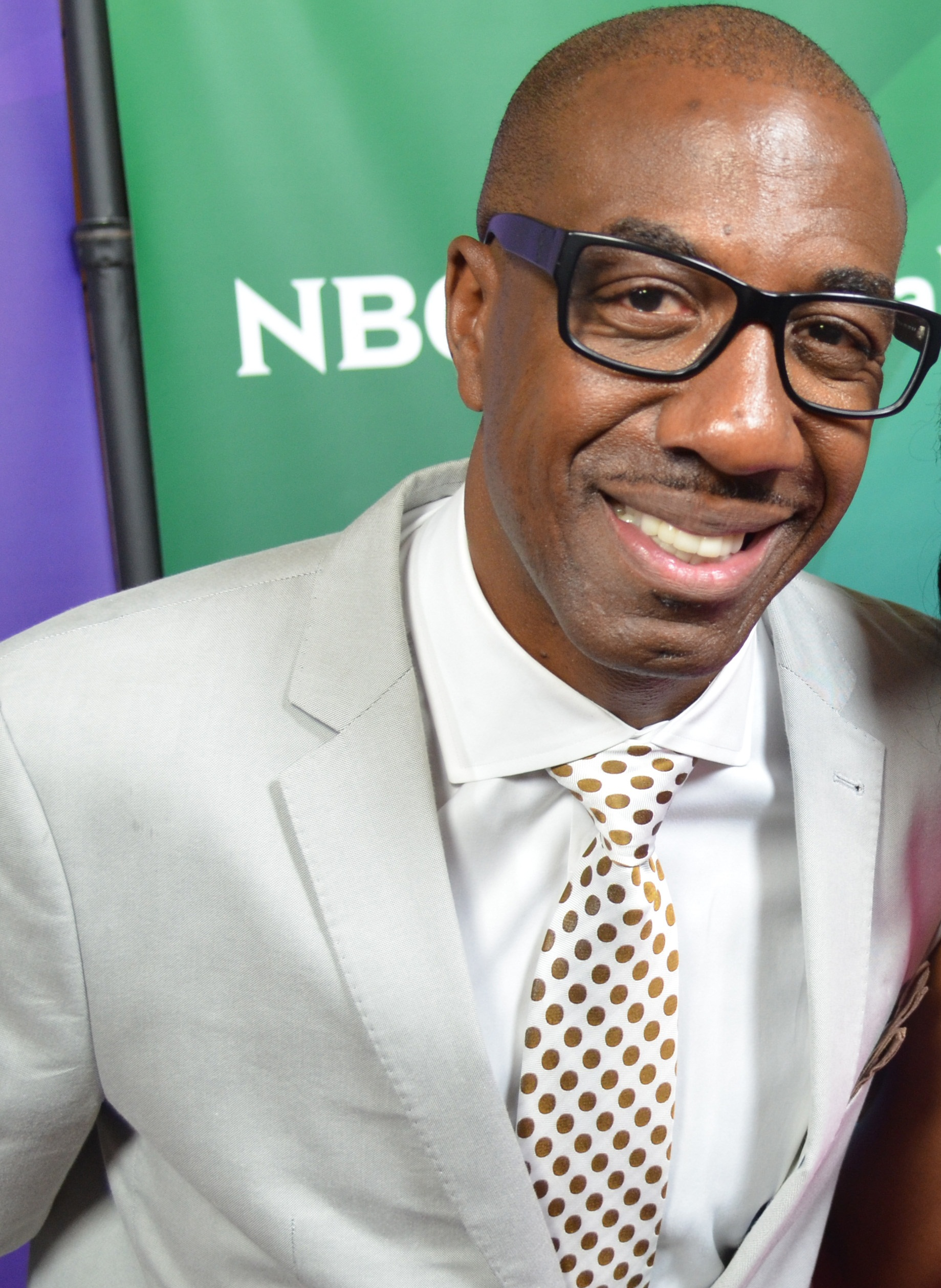
J. B. Smoove joined the series in season 6 as Leon Black. His character quickly became a fan favorite.

- Larry David as a fictionalized version of himself, the show's idiosyncratic, tactless and curmudgeonly protagonist. Larry is a semi-retired television writer and producer. Born and raised in New York, he is the only child of Nat and Adele David. He is Jewish, but he is not observant and is willing to betray his heritage (or overemphasize it) when it suits him. After years struggling as a writer and comic, he gained massive success with the sitcom Seinfeld. Having made a fortune off the show, Larry now works only occasionally. Stubborn and self-centered, he frequently flouts social conventions he perceives as pointless, inconvenient, or nonsensical. But at the same time, he rebukes friends, acquaintances, and strangers for failing to adhere to his self-imposed (and often equally nonsensical) social rules. Larry often becomes obsessed with minute, insignificant details of others' behavior, and is seemingly unable to let any grievance, annoyance, or inappropriate remark go unexpressed. He is often reluctant to apologize to people he has offended, firmly believing himself to be in the right and going to extreme lengths to prove the correctness of his beliefs and actions. When he does apologize, he usually does so only because he needs something, and he is often more self-defensive than truly apologetic. But Larry is generally well-intentioned, and is often simply a victim of circumstance, finding himself at the center of complex misunderstandings or falling victim to others' selfishness and/or stupidity. He is even at times celebrated by those around him for his candor and his willingness to call others out for their hypocrisy.
- Jeff Garlin as Jeff Greene, Larry's manager and best friend. He is married to Susie Greene (Susie Essman), with whom he has a daughter, Sammi (Ashly Holloway). Jeff and Susie have a tumultuous marriage, due in large part to Jeff's frequent extramarital affairs as well as Susie's incessant criticism of Jeff, most often in regard to his weight and cheating. Jeff often recruits Larry in his efforts to cover up his affairs from Susie, though these efforts usually fall apart. Garlin has said that he does not empathize with his character at all, calling him a "pretty evil guy" who has "no morals, no scruples".
- Cheryl Hines as Cheryl David (seasons 1–7, 9–12; guest season 8), Larry's long-suffering wife (and later ex-wife). Patient, friendly, and generally easygoing, she serves as a comic foil to the stubborn and nit-picky Larry and often serves as a voice of reason. She is nominally an actress, but is not shown working for most of the series. She is very environmentally conscious and devotes a great deal of her time and money to charitable causes, particularly the NRDC. Unlike Larry, Cheryl is outgoing, enjoys most social functions, and is the primary agent in maintaining many of the couple's friendships. She is also the driving force behind many of Larry's apologies. While she feels a deep affection for Larry and often shows patience with his foibles, she has her limits, particularly with his obsession over unimportant details. She is finally pushed to her breaking point in the season 6 episode "The TiVo Guy" when, aboard a flight experiencing severe turbulence, she calls Larry to tell him she loves him. To her shock and anger, Larry pays no attention to what is ostensibly his wife's final goodbye and instead badgers her with questions about their DVR. In the wake of the incident, Cheryl leaves Larry. They briefly reunite at the end of season 7 before Cheryl is once again driven away by Larry's obsession with details, in particular a stain Cheryl's coffee cup left on Julia Louis-Dreyfus's table. They finalize their divorce at the start of season 8. In season 9, Cheryl begins dating Larry's friend Ted Danson. Before that, she and Ted had a close, platonic friendship, of which Larry was always suspicious.
- Susie Essman as Susie Greene (seasons 8–12; recurring seasons 1–7), Jeff's loud and overbearing wife, known for her explosive temper. Her interactions with Larry often begin friendly and quickly degrade into vicious arguments. Shrewd and perpetually suspicious of both Jeff and Larry, Susie is often the first to uncover their schemes and wrongdoing and often rebukes them with profanity-laced tirades. Susie and Jeff have an "on-again, off-again" relationship. She often uses Larry as a scapegoat for her marital problems. She often defends traditional moral standards, such as the sanctity of marital vows and fealty to hearth and home, at times against Jeff, at others against Larry, and usually against both.
- J. B. Smoove as Leon Black (seasons 9–12; recurring seasons 6–8), Larry's friend, and later, roommate (casita). He is the brother of Loretta Black, a single mother whose New Orleans home was destroyed by Hurricane Edna. When Larry and Cheryl take in Loretta and her family, Leon moves in too, despite living in Los Angeles and having been unaffected by the hurricane. When Loretta and her children move back to Louisiana, Leon stays behind. He and Larry develop an unlikely friendship, with Leon frequently offering Larry questionable advice on romance, business, and social interactions. Like Larry, Leon is blunt and often confrontational, although unlike Larry, his confrontations with others end favorably for him. Leon first appears in the season 6 episode "The Anonymous Donor".

=== Recurring roles ===
Among the show's many recurring roles, Richard Lewis, Ted Danson, and Wanda Sykes play fictionalized versions of themselves as old friends of Larry with whom he frequently butts heads. Shelley Berman plays Larry's father, Nat David. Richard Kind appears as Larry's cousin Andy. Bob Einstein frequently appears as Marty Funkhouser, another of Larry's longtime friends. Kaitlin Olson recurs as Becky, Cheryl's sister. In seasons 6 and 7, Vivica A. Fox appears as Loretta Black, a member of the Black family, a family of hurricane evacuees who take refuge in Larry's house upon Cheryl's invitation. Loretta becomes Larry's primary love interest for a time after he and Cheryl split up. Saverio Guerra plays Mocha Joe, who first appears in season 7 and returns as Larry's nemesis in season 10.

=== Notable guest appearances ===
Celebrities, including actors, comedians, authors, musicians and athletes, often make guest appearances on the show, many of them playing themselves or fictional versions thereof. Some who appear as fictionalized versions of themselves include Mary Steenburgen, Bruce Springsteen, Mel Brooks, Michael York, Martin Scorsese, Lucy Liu, Ben Stiller, Christian Slater, David Schwimmer, Rob Reiner, Rosie O'Donnell, Seth Rogen, Martin Short, Shaquille O'Neal, George Lopez, Michael J. Fox, Mila Kunis, Lin-Manuel Miranda, F. Murray Abraham, Jon Hamm, and the main cast of Seinfeld – Jerry Seinfeld, Julia Louis-Dreyfus, Jason Alexander, and Michael Richards.

Notable people who fill in fictional roles include Bryan Cranston, Bob Odenkirk, Michael McKean, Wayne Federman, Gina Gershon, Elisabeth Shue, Vince Vaughn, Bobby Lee, Frank Whaley, Kaley Cuoco, Mayim Bialik, Stephen Colbert, Bill Hader, Catherine O'Hara, Nick Offerman, Flula Borg, Chaz Bono, Rebecca Romijn, Melissa McCarthy, Tracey Ullman, Steve Buscemi, Greg Kinnear, Dean Norris, Zachary Levi, Mindy Kaling, and Allison Janney.

== Reception ==
=== Critical response ===
Critical response of Curb Your Enthusiasm
Season	Rotten Tomatoes	Metacritic
1	89% (18 reviews)	80 (20 reviews)
2	100% (8 reviews)	—N/a
3	100% (10 reviews)	93 (12 reviews)
4	93% (14 reviews)	88 (18 reviews)
5	100% (11 reviews)	91 (5 reviews)
6	87% (15 reviews)	89 (9 reviews)
7	97% (32 reviews)	81 (18 reviews)
8	92% (25 reviews)	86 (6 reviews)
9	74% (47 reviews)	74 (10 reviews)
10	94% (36 reviews)	78 (5 reviews)
11	94% (17 reviews)	89 (7 reviews)
12	94% (50 reviews)	82 (17 reviews)

Curb Your Enthusiasm has received critical acclaim, praised particularly for its writing and the actors' improvisational comedy. The show enjoyed largely positive critical reception since its debut and outgrew its early "cult" status.

On Metacritic, the first season of the show scored 80 out of 100 (based on 20 reviews), 93 for season 3 (based on 12 reviews), 88 for season 4 (18 reviews), 91 for season 5 (5 reviews), 89 for season 6 (9 reviews), 81 for season 7 (18 reviews), 86 for season 8 (6 reviews), 74 for season 9 (10 reviews), 78 for season 10 (5 reviews), 89 for season 11 (7 reviews), and 82 for season 12 (17 reviews).

Slate named the characters Cheryl David and Susie Greene two of the best on television and reasons to look forward to the show's return in 2007. Curb Your Enthusiasm has also received praise from Galus Australis magazine for being even more unabashedly Jewish than Seinfeld. Of the show's depiction of Jewish characters, academic Vincent Brook wrote, "Curb's commitment to Jewish identification greatly enhances its storytelling capacity, as it lends greater realism and dimension to the characters and opens the show up to episodes with meaningful Jewish themes."

The character of Larry is in many ways reminiscent of the schlemiel character in traditional Yiddish folklore. The schlemiel is usually a comic character whose actions lead to his inevitable downfall, but also stands as a form of resistance to social and cultural values and norms. David Gillota wrote:

As a true schlemiel, Larry's failure serves as a direct challenge to the status quo and encourages viewers to question the myriad unwritten rules that we follow in our everyday lives. Whereas the schlemiel of Eastern Europe encountered problems that mostly affected Eastern European Jews (such as anti-Semitism and economic survival), Larry encounters problems that affect contemporary middle- to upper-class American Jews, namely, Jewish assimilation, secularism, intermarriage, and, as all of these suggest, the Jews' precarious ethnic identity in an increasingly multicultural environment.

In 2013, the Writers Guild of America ranked Curb Your Enthusiasm #30 on its list of the 101 Best Written TV Series. In 2019, The Guardian ranked it the 13th-greatest television show of the 21st century. In 2022, Alan Sepinwall of Rolling Stone ranked it the 39th-greatest television show of all time. In 2026, The New York Times ranked it #9 on its list of the 100 Best TV Shows of the 21st Century.

=== Awards and nominations ===
The series received 55 Primetime Emmy Award nominations, winning twice: Outstanding Directing for a Comedy Series for Robert B. Weide for "Krazee-Eyez Killa" in 2003, and Outstanding Single-Camera Picture Editing for a Comedy Series for Steven Rasch for "Palestinian Chicken" in 2012. The series received eleven nominations for Outstanding Comedy Series. Larry David received seven nominations for Outstanding Lead Actor in a Comedy Series. Cheryl Hines received two nominations for Outstanding Supporting Actress in a Comedy Series. Shelley Berman and Michael J. Fox each received a nomination for Outstanding Guest Actor in a Comedy Series. The series also received ten nominations for Outstanding Directing for a Comedy Series. The ninth season received four nominations at the 70th Primetime Emmy Awards, for Outstanding Comedy Series, Larry David for Outstanding Lead Actor in a Comedy Series, and Bryan Cranston and Lin-Manuel Miranda each for Outstanding Guest Actor in a Comedy Series. The tenth season was nominated for Outstanding Comedy Series at the 72nd Primetime Emmy Awards, and the series received three further nominations in technical categories.

The series also received five Golden Globe Award nominations (in 2003 and 2006) and won for Best Television Series – Musical or Comedy in 2003. Larry David was nominated for three Golden Globe Awards for Best Actor – Television Series Musical or Comedy in 2003, 2005, and 2006. It was nominated for four Actor Awards, two for Larry David for Outstanding Performance by a Male Actor in a Comedy Series as well as two Outstanding Performance by an Ensemble in a Comedy Series. It was nominated six times for the Producers Guild of America Awards for Best Episodic Comedy, winning twice in 2003 and 2005. It was nominated for eleven Directors Guild of America Awards for Outstanding Directorial Achievement in Comedy Series, winning twice for Bryan Gordon for "The Special Section" in 2003 and Robert B. Weide for "Palestinian Chicken" in 2012. It was nominated five times for the Writers Guild of America Award for Television: Comedy Series, winning once in 2006.

== Syndication ==
When aired in syndication, the series is edited from its original HBO broadcast (for running time and without the TV-MA scenes). On June 2, 2010, the series premiered on the TV Guide Network, making its basic cable debut. The network also recorded a series of related discussions with high-profile guest stars, media pundits, and prominent social figures called Curb Your Enthusiasm: The Discussion, debating the moral implications depicted in each episode. The show was produced by Scott Carter and hosted by Curb co-star Susie Essman.

The show debuted in syndication on local stations and WGN America in September 2010, but was removed the following year due to low ratings.

It debuted on TV Land in February 2013 but was later removed in 2015.

== Home media ==
=== VHS release ===
The first season of Curb Your Enthusiasm was released on VHS in a three-volume box set.

=== DVD releases ===
Curb Your Enthusiasm seasons come in a two-disc DVD set with ten episodes.

DVD releases of Curb Your Enthusiasm
Season	Release dates		Bonus features
Season	Region 1	Region 2	Bonus features
1	January 13, 2004	May 17, 2004	Commentary by Larry David, Jeff Garlin, Cheryl Hines and Robert B. Weide on the pilot episode; interview with Larry David; HBO TV special Larry David: Curb Your Enthusiasm
2	June 15, 2004	October 18, 2004	None
3	January 18, 2005	February 7, 2005	60 minutes of extras with the cast and directors at the U.S. Comedy Arts Festival in Aspen
4	August 30, 2005	September 26, 2005	None
5	August 1, 2006	September 11, 2006	"The History of Curb... so far" and "The History of Curb... even further" featurettes
6	January 29, 2008	June 9, 2008	"A Conversation with Larry David and Susie Essman"; "On the Set: Curb Your Enthusiasm"; gag reel
7	June 8, 2010	June 7, 2010	Rebuilding the Seinfeld sets; Larry David as George Costanza; interview with Larry David and the Seinfeld cast, and more
8	June 5, 2012	June 11, 2012	"Leon's Guide to NYC"; roundtable discussion with Larry and the cast
9	March 6, 2018	March 5, 2018	Cast memorable moments and deleted scenes
10	July 21, 2020	July 20, 2020	"What Finally Broke Them"
11	June 14, 2022	June 13, 2022	None
12	October 8, 2024	October 7, 2024	
The Complete Series	October 8, 2024	October 7, 2024	See individual releases

== Other media ==
=== Book ===
A Curb Your Enthusiasm book was released on October 19, 2006, published by Gotham Books. The book contains stories from Larry David's past, original interviews and commentary, episode outlines, episode guide, and over 100 full-color photographs. The contents of the book span the first five seasons of the show.

=== Music ===
The show is punctuated between scenes with music orchestrated by Wendell Yuponce and from a music library company called Killer Tracks. Frequently heard are instrumental arrangements of the whimsical "Three Little Maids From School Are We" from The Mikado, and the rhythmic Gypsy dance "Les tringles des sistres tintaient" from Carmen.

The opening and closing theme song (not mentioned in the credits) is "Frolic" by Italian composer Luciano Michelini. Larry David heard the music used in a bank commercial years before the show was created and thought it had a lighthearted, joyful quality. An unofficial soundtrack was released by Mellowdrama Records in 2006.

=== Documentary ===
The 2017 Netflix documentary film Long Shot contains raw footage from the filming of an episode of season 4 at Dodger Stadium which helped to inadvertently exonerate Juan Catalan, who was accused of murder and faced the death penalty, by giving him an alibi during the time the murder was committed.

== In popular culture ==
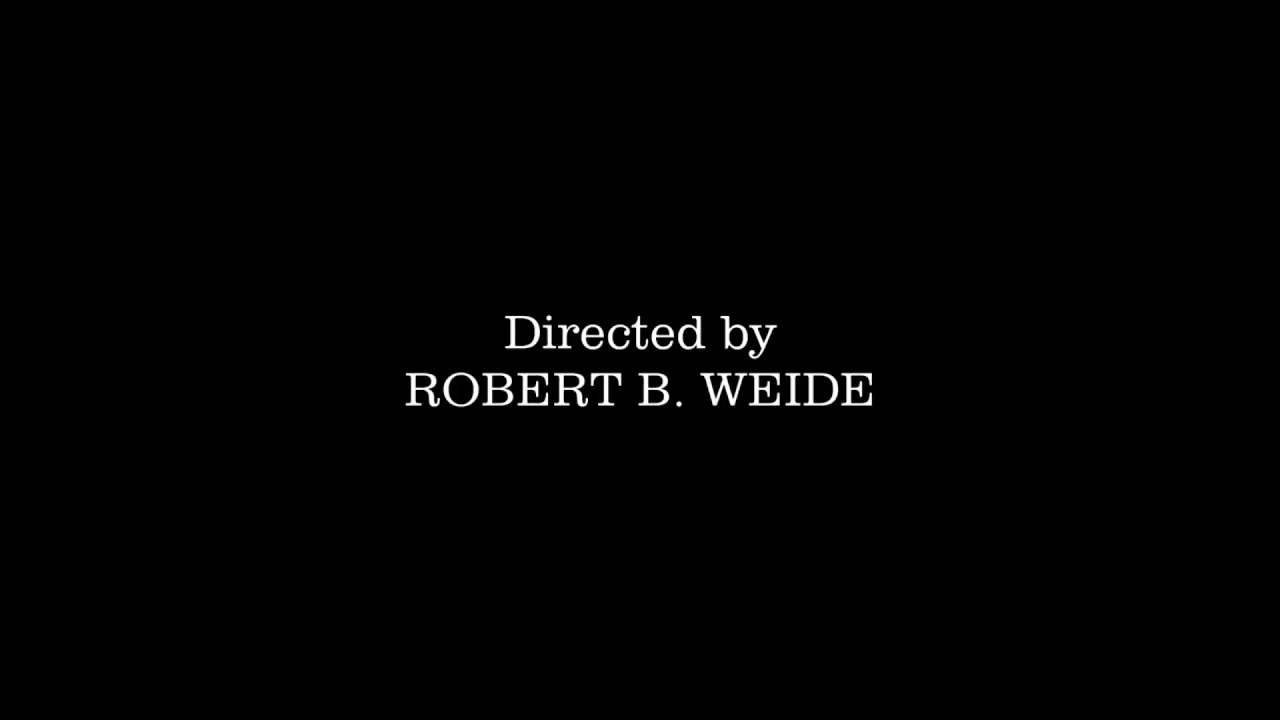
The part of the credits where the meme comes from

The show's closing credits have been used as an internet meme, paired with clips of people in awkward situations. The meme typically appears right after an awkward, ironic, or disastrous moment as a comedic punchline. Although Weide had no role in the meme's creation, he has acknowledged its popularity online, often responding with amusement to seeing his name used as a symbol of comic misfortune.

The theme music was used in the epilogue of the South Park episode "Conflict of Interest".

== See also ==
- List of television shows listed among the best
- List of Primetime Emmy Awards received by HBO
