= Jeffrey P. Jones =

American executive

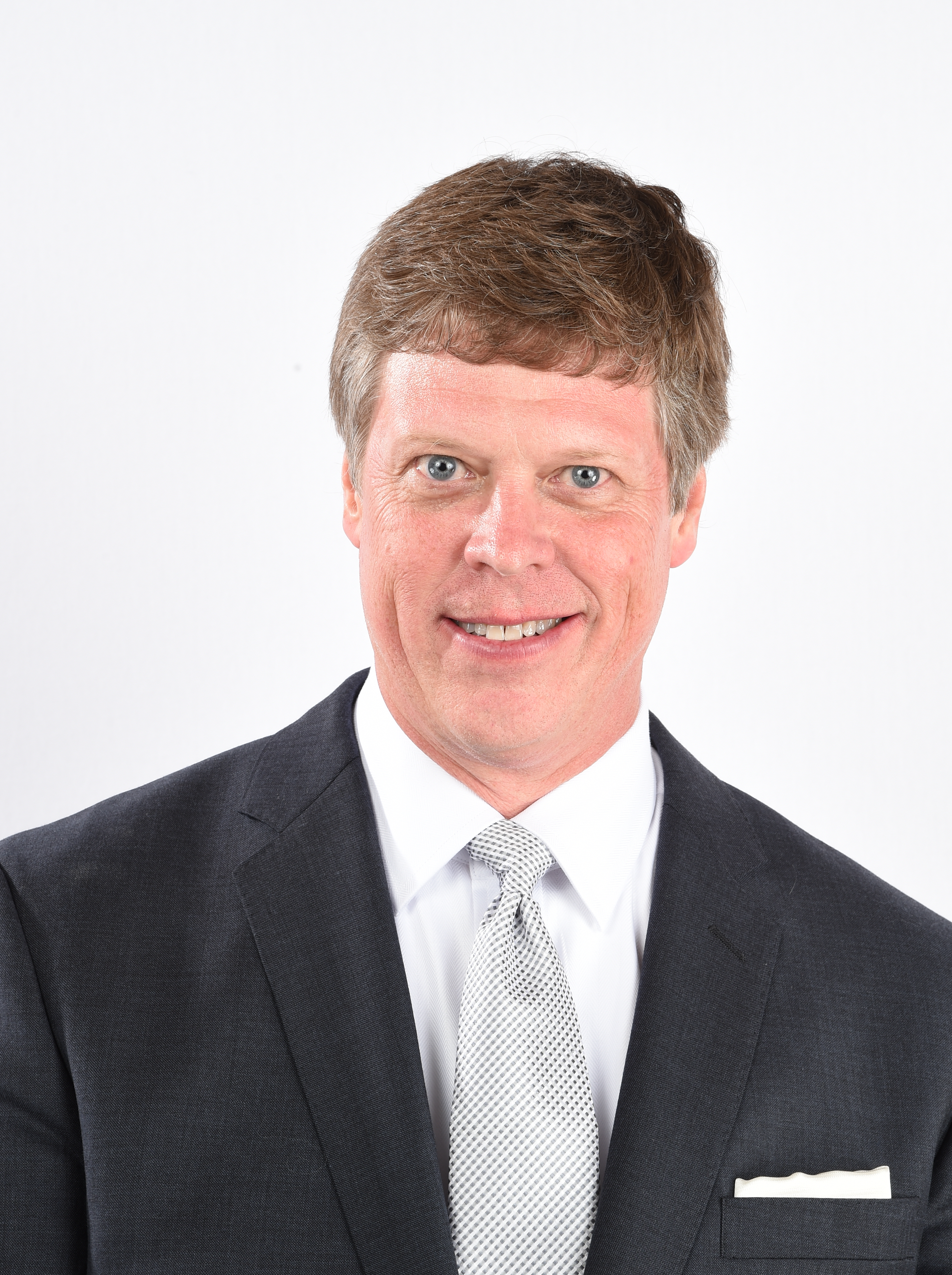
- Jones at the 74th Annual Peabody Awards (2015)

Jeffrey P. Jones is executive director of the George Foster Peabody Awards and Lambdin Kay Chair for the Peabodys at the University of Georgia. Jones was appointed as only the fifth director of the program in July 2013. He is also Director of the Peabody Media Center. Jones is the author and editor of six books including Entertaining Politics: Satirical Television and Political Engagement and Satire TV: Politics and Comedy in the Post-Network Era.

== Education ==
Jeffrey P. Jones was born in Greenville, South Carolina, but hails from Auburn, Alabama. He attended Auburn University, where he earned a BA in political science in 1985 and an MA in political science in 1993, with an emphasis in Soviet and East European Studies. He attended the University of Texas at Austin on a Foreign Language Area Studies Fellowship (FLAS) in 1993, before changing career paths and earning a PhD in radio-TV-film in 1999. His dissertation was a case study of Politically Incorrect with Bill Maher, the foundation for Jones's first book, Entertaining Politics: New Political Television and Civic Culture.

Jones has held teaching positions at colleges and universities in Texas, Alabama, Maryland, Virginia, and Georgia, where he has taught courses in television, journalism, documentary, political communication, law and policy, new media, and popular culture.

== Career ==
=== Academic positions ===
Jeffrey P. Jones is professor, Lambdin Kay Chair for the Peabodys, and executive director of the Peabody Awards at the University of Georgia. Under his tenure, the awards ceremony was changed from a weekday luncheon held at the Waldorf Astoria in New York City to a weekend dinner with red carpet at Cipriani Wall Street in downtown Manhattan. In 2016, the awards also began announcing 60 nominees for the first time, from which 30 winners were chosen for receipt of a Peabody Award.

The ceremony also began using comedian hosts, including Fred Armison (2015), Keegan-Michael Key (2016), Rashida Jones (2017), and Hasan Minhaj (2018). The awards’ recognition of outstanding media careers was formalized in 2018 with the launched of the Mercedes Benz Career Achievement Award, honoring Carol Burnett in 2018 and PEGOT-winner Rita Morena in 2019.

In 2016 Jones launched the Peabody Media Center, the scholarly and digital programming arm of the Peabody Awards program, becoming its director. He also produced, supervised, and developed, with Den of Thieves, five television specials for national broadcast and cable television on PBS, FX, Fusion, and Pivot.

Beginning in 2015, Jones established a West Coast Board of Directors, composed of top industry leaders from the entertainment industry. In 2019, an East Coast Board of Directors was created with leaders from journalism, radio, podcasting, documentary, public media, technology, and philanthropy.

Jones also created and launched the Futures of Media Award in 2016, initially sponsored by Facebook—an award for digital storytelling that recognizes excellence and innovation in seven categories: webisodes, virtual reality, video games, interactive documentaries, mobile media, data journalism, and transmedia storytelling.

Previously Jones was director of the Institute of Humanities at Old Dominion University in Norfolk, Virginia from 2010 to 2013.

=== Research ===
Jones, author and editor of six books, was a pioneer in the field of political entertainment studies, penning one of the first books on the political satire's resurgence and importance on American television. His research has focused on the intersections of politics and popular culture, on television but also in presidential elections. His best-known work is Entertaining Politics: Satiric Television and Civic Engagement, 2nd ed. He has written extensively on Jon Stewart, Stephen Colbert, Bill Maher, Michael Moore, Saturday Night Live, as well as cable and network talk shows and Fox News.

== Publications ==
=== Books ===
- Thompson, Ethan; Jones, Jeffrey P.; Hatlan, Lucas (2019). Television History, the Peabody Archives, and Cultural Memory. Athens: University of Georgia Press.
- Baym, Geoffrey; Jones, Jeffrey P., eds. (2012). News Parody and Political Satire Across the Globe. London, UK: Routledge. p. 200. ISBN 978-0-415-69293-9.
- Jones, Jeffrey P. (2010). Entertaining Politics: Satiric Television and Political Engagement (2nd. ed.). Lanham, MD: Rowman and Littlefield. p. 328. ISBN 978-0-742-56528-9.
- Gray, Jonathan; Jones, Jeffrey P.; Thompson, Ethan (2009). Satire TV: Politics and Comedy in the Post-Network Era. New York, NY: NYU Press. p. 288. ISBN 978-0-814-73199-4.
- Edgerton, Gary R.; Jones, Jeffrey P., eds. (2008). The Essential HBO Reader. Lexington, KY: University Press of Kentucky. p. 372. ISBN 978-0-813-19248-2.
- Jones, Jeffrey P. (2005). Entertaining Politics: New Political Television and Civic Culture. Lanham, MD: Rowman and Littlefield. p. 264. ISBN 0-742-53088-4.

=== Selected articles ===
- Jones, Jeffrey P. (2013). "Toward a New Vocabulary for Political Communication Research: A Response to Michael X. Delli Carpini". International Journal of Communication. 7: 510–530.
- Jones, Jeffrey P. (2012). "The 'New' News as No 'News': U.S. Cable News Channels as Branded Political Entertainment Television". Media International Australia. 144 (August) (Special Issue: "The 'New' News." ed.): 146–155. doi:10.1177/1329878X1214400119. S2CID 113088484.
- Jones, Jeffrey P.; Baym, Geoffrey; Day, Amber (2012). "Mr. Stewart and Mr. Colbert Go to Washington: Television Satirists Outside the Box". Social Research. 79 (1) (Special Issue: "Politics and Comedy." ed.): 33–60. doi:10.1353/sor.2012.0032. S2CID 141032181.
- Jones, Jeffrey P.; Baym, Geoffrey (2010). "A Dialogue on Satire News and the Crisis of Truth in Postmodern Political Television". Journal of Communication Inquiry. 34 (3): 278–294. doi:10.1177/0196859910373654. S2CID 145086766.
- Jones, Jeffrey P. (2009). "I Want My Talk TV: Network Talk Shows in a Digital Universe.". In Amanda, Lotz (ed.). Beyond Prime Time: Television Programming in the Post-Network Era. New York, NY: Routledge. pp. 14–35.
- Jones, Jeffrey P. (2006). "A Cultural Approach to the Study of Mediated Citizenship". Social Semiotics. 16 (2): 550–562. doi:10.1080/10350330600664912. S2CID 143659340.
