= Hayden5 =

- Trade name: Hayden5
- Formerly: Hayden 5 (with space); Man With A Cam
- Company type: Private
- Industry: Media production Advertising; Entertainment
- Founded: 2009
- Founders: Todd Wiseman Jr; Milos S. Silber
- Headquarters: New York City; Los Angeles
- Areas served: Worldwide
- Products: Commercials; Music videos Television; Film; Live Events
- Services: Video production Video post-production Creative development
- Divisions: Man With A Cam
- Website: hayden5.com manwithacam.org

Hayden5 is a video creation company headquartered in New York City, with offices in Los Angeles. The company was co-founded by Todd Wiseman Jr and. Milos S. Silber in 2009. Wiseman Jr resigned from his role in Summer 2023.

== History ==
=== Early years ===
Todd Wiseman Jr and Milos S. Silber met as film students at New York University in 2005. They were neighbors on the fifth floor of the Hayden Hall dormitory, which later inspired the name of their company. As students, the pair began collaborating on small film projects in New York City. Silber was born in Brazil and moved to Westchester, New York during grade school. Wiseman Jr grew up in Tampa, Florida.

Hayden5 was founded in 2009.

Early productions of Hayden5 included music videos for artists like Juelz Santana, Benny Benassi, and Mariah Carey, as well as branded content for The Economist and Bowlero Corporation (at the time, just a single bowling alley called Bowlmor Lanes).

=== Software development ===
In 2014, Hayden5 developed proprietary software to manage the scale and volume of local productions they were managing across the United States and globally. The tool evolved into the current software suite, ProducerAI.

In 2020, Hayden5 released Crew+, an always-on streaming production service. In 2021, Hayden5 released Cloud Cuts, a full-service fully distributed post-production department. In 2022, they released Lightning Delivery, a service for expedited file transfers.

=== Clients ===
External videos
- "HelloFlo's Hilarious 'Camp Gyno' Commercial Goes Viral" (July 2013)
- "Jon Batiste Social Music Residency at the NoMad Hotel Recap" (August 2015)

Hayden5 brand clients have included LinkedIn, Apple Inc., The New York Times, and Facebook. Notable film projects include We Live This, Revolving Doors, and Long Shot, which was nominated for an Emmy award.

In July 2013, Hayden5 debuted a new commercial for HelloFlo's Camp Gyno campaign. The commercial eventually received a Webby Award.

Hayden5 produced a public service announcement for the Innocence Project that debuted in 2021. The PSA won a Webby Award.

== Awards and nominations ==
Year	Award	Nominee	Category	Result
2013	Webby Awards	HelloFlo – The Camp Gyno	Honoree	Won
2014	Telly Awards	Zipcar – I’d Tap That	Branded Content	Won
2015	Cannes Lions Awards	HelloFlo – First Moon Party	Online Film	Won
2015	Webby Awards	HelloFlo – First Moon Party	Advertising & Media - Branded Content	Won
2015	AICP Awards	HelloFlo – First Moon Party	Comedy	Nominated
2015	Tribeca Film Festival	We Live This	Special Jury Mention	Won
2016	Film Festival Kitzbühel	Lightningface	Best Short Film	Won
2018	Emmy Awards	Long Shot	Outstanding Short Documentary	Nominated
2022	Anthem Awards	Innocence Project – Happiest Moments	Best Humanitarian & Services Campaign	Won
2022	Clio Awards	Change The Ref – Bring Back Lockdown	Public Service Social Video	Won
2022	Webby Awards	Innocence Project – Happiest Moments	Public Service & Activism	Won

== Philanthropy ==
As a company, Hayden5 supports several philanthropic efforts under their non-profit arm named Hayden5 RISE, which launched in 2020. In 2021, with the global nonprofit Video Consortium, Hayden5 launched Gear Grant, an initiative dedicated to supporting underrepresented filmmakers.

In July 2021, Hayden5 partnered with Phenomenal, a female-driven media brand, to create and finance "Own Your Crown" – a PSA celebrating National CROWN Day on July 3. The CROWN Coalition, an alliance of organizations, including Dove, National Urban League, and Color of Change, declared July 3 as National CROWN Day in 2020 to mark the one-year anniversary of the CROWN Act (“Creating a Respectful and Open World for Natural Hair”) in California. These and other actions eventually led to the passing of the CROWN Act of 2022, a bill in the United States Congress intended to prohibit discrimination based on hair style and hair texture by clarifying that such discrimination is illegal under existing federal law.

Since 2016, Hayden5 has supported the cancer treatment and research institution, Memorial Sloan Kettering Cancer Center, in their Cycle for Survival indoor team cycling event that donates all of its proceeds to cancer research. Hayden5 is also a supporter of Pencils of Promise, whose efforts help to build schools and increases educational opportunities in the developing world.
