= Cycle for Survival =

Cancer charity fundraiser

Cycle for Survival is a nationwide (US) movement to beat rare cancers, owned and operated by Memorial Sloan Kettering Cancer Center (MSK). Since its inception in 2007, Cycle for Survival—with support from its founding partner Equinox Fitness—has raised more than $208 million as of 2019. Cycle for Survival directly allocates 100% of all donations to rare cancer research led by MSK within six months of the events.

== History ==
Cycle for Survival was founded by Jennifer Goodman Linn and her husband, David Linn. In 2004, Jen was diagnosed with MFH sarcoma, a rare cancer, and began treatment at Memorial Sloan Kettering Cancer Center (MSK). After her cancer went into remission, she and Dave wanted to fight back and support the doctors and researchers at MSK.

In 2007, they held the first-ever event, originally named "Spin4Survival", in Equinox Columbus Circle to raise money for rare cancer research. Despite Jen's cancer returning, they held two successful events and in 2009, MSK became the owner and operator and Equinox became the founding partner of what it is known today as Cycle for Survival. Jen lost her battle to cancer in 2011 at the age of 40. After she died MSK named a lab "The Jennifer Goodman Linn Laboratory of New Drug Development in Sarcoma and Rare Cancers".

At the heart of the movement is a series of indoor team cycling events that take place across the country.

== Events ==
Cycle for Survival's signature events are indoor team cycling rides that take place across the country, primarily at Equinox clubs. Cancer survivors, patients, caregivers, Memorial Sloan Kettering doctors, researchers and their supporters ride together on stationary bikes to fundraise for rare cancer research. Equinox cycling instructors lead all rides. In 2018, more than 34,000 people participated in Cycle for Survival events that were held in 16 cities in the United States. That same year, over $39 million was raised and directly allocated to rare cancer research at MSK.

Cycle for Survival held Times Square Takeover from 2013 - 2017 to kick off event registration each September.

== Partnerships ==
Corporate sponsors help the events continue to grow and gain further support. Equinox, the founding partner of Cycle for Survival, dedicates significant time and resources to help raise awareness and funding. Additional sponsors of Cycle for Survival include official apparel sponsor, New Balance; official hydration sponsor, Smartwater; and official timepiece and timekeeper, TAG Heuer.

== Impact on rare cancers ==
The National Institute of Health defines a "rare cancer" as one with fewer than 200,000 affected individuals within the United States. Approximately 50% of people with cancer are battling a cancer that is considered "rare". Rare cancers include brain, ovarian, pediatric and pancreatic cancers, lymphoma and leukemia, and many other types of cancers.

All donations gained through Cycle for Survival fund promising research and clinical trials at Memorial Sloan Kettering.

== Reception and awards ==
Cycle for Survival has been featured in a variety of local and national broadcast, digital, and print coverage including: CNN, Refinery29, Shape magazine, USA Today, ABC News, Good Morning America, Fast Company, and New York Post.

In 2018, Cycle for Survival was named P2P Forum's Program of the Year during their annual conference held in Miami, Florida. It was also recognized as the fastest-growing peer-to-peer fundraising program from 2014 to 2016.
