= Gamegun =

Light gun for the 3DO

The Gamegun (styled GAMEGUN on its packaging) is the only light gun released for the 3DO video game console. It was released in 1994 by American Laser Games, developers of full motion video-based shooter games. The Gamegun is styled exactly like the Peacekeeper Revolver, a light gun for the CD-i also released by American Laser Games, except with a notable color difference. The peripheral came in two versions: one player and two-player. The only difference between the two is that the two-player version, which was released in 1995, came with an attached y-connector end, allowing two players to plug in two light guns to play simultaneously. With the one player version, the gun could be daisy chained with a regular 3DO controller, allowing another player to use the gamepad at the same time. American Laser Games also released versions of the Gamegun for the Sega CD and PCs running DOS.

== Supported games ==
The Gamegun is supported by 12 games, including two arcade games that ran on 3DO hardware but were never released for the home console:

- Corpse Killer
- Crime Patrol
- Demolition Man
- Drug Wars
- Fast Draw Showdown (arcade only)
- Gunslinger's Collection (compilation bundling both Mad Dog games with Crime Patrol)
- The Last Bounty Hunter
- Mad Dog McCree
- Mad Dog II: The Lost Gold
- Shootout at Old Tucson (arcade only)
- Space Pirates
- Who Shot Johnny Rock
