= Peacekeeper Revolver =

Video game gun for the Phillips CD-i video game console

The Peacekeeper Revolver is the light gun released for the Philips CD-i multimedia system. It was released in 1994 and was bundled with Mad Dog McCree, retailing for $60 (USD). The gun required manual calibration, accomplished via menu options in all supported games.

It used an infrared device positioned next to the screen in order for it to register movement, making the Peacekeeper unusual compared to most other light guns of the era, which were reliant on the scanout of CRTs to function.

== History ==
In 2011, there was a patent dispute between Philips and Nintendo over the use of the technology (a remote and a “sensor” bar) for the Wii (and later the Wii U), which was settled out of court in 2014.

== Games ==
- Crime Patrol
- Crime Patrol 2: Drug Wars
- The Last Bounty Hunter
- Mad Dog McCree
- Mad Dog II: The Lost Gold
- Thunder in Paradise
- Who Shot Johnny Rock?
