= Who Shot Johnny Rock? =

1991 video game

- Developers: American Laser Games; Origin Systems (3DO)
- Publishers: American Laser Games; Philips (CD-i); Digital Leisure (DVD, Windows)
- Director: David Roberts
- Designer: Kylene Wing
- Programmer: Pierre Maloka
- Platforms: Arcade, MS-DOS, Sega CD, CD-i, 3DO, DVD, Microsoft Windows
- Release: Arcade: NA: 1991; MS-DOS: NA: 1994; Sega CD: NA: 1994; 3DO: NA: 1994; CD-i: NA: 1995; EU: 1995; DVD: NA: November 28, 2001; Microsoft Windows: NA: 2003
- Genres: Interactive movie, light gun shooter
- Mode: Single-player

Who Shot Johnny Rock? is a full-motion video LaserDisc video game produced by American Laser Games and released for arcades in 1991. Versions followed for MS-DOS, Sega CD, 3DO and CD-i. Part of a series of similar-styled games released by the company, Who Shot Johnny Rock? introduces a different setting than most of the others, while maintaining almost identical gameplay. The game was re-released by Digital Leisure around 2003 with updated video and sound, in addition to several bonus options.

== Plot ==
The game is set in a Hollywood version of 1930s Chicago, where the player takes on the role of a private detective hired to find out who murdered nightclub singer Johnny Rock. The player must attempt to reach Johnny Rock's killer, shooting villains and interrogating individuals. The game takes the player through the gangs of four gangsters with suggestive names - Munition factory owner Measles, Bar Owner Mumps, Mechanic Pox, and Casino Owner Lockjaw Lil, each of whom knew Rock and are suspects in his murder - and locations such as a warehouse, a pool hall, a garage and a casino.

== Gameplay ==
As is the case with other American Laser Games releases, the game is played from a first-person perspective of the player watching the full motion video, listening to the various characters and shooting the right enemies at the right times with a powerful Tommy gun. Most other games produced by the company - with minor exceptions such as The Last Bounty Hunter, where the player can use a shotgun for a limited amount of time - feature no more than a simple pistol, which must be used to eliminate successive foes. The player character narrates the story.

Unlike previous games, such as Mad Dog McCree and Crime Patrol, the player's Tommy gun does not need to be reloaded, but one does need to buy extra ammunition. Also, when health is lost, the player must purchase extra lives from the city doctor. If money runs out, the game is over. The player must also try to avoid hitting innocent bystanders, as doing so results in having to pay funeral expenses. The doctor also gives advice (usually fake) and criticizes the player's actions.

Along the way, the player must collect clues, which will eventually allow the player to determine Johnny Rock's murderer. One of the final sequences takes place in Rock's mansion, where a final clue will point to the killer, who must be defeated and apprehended to win the game. The identity of the killer is determined randomly on each playthrough from one of the four suspected gangsters.

As in most rail shooters by American Laser Games, the MS-DOS and 3DO versions include mouse and light gun support. The Sega CD version supports the Konami Justifier light gun.

== Development ==
Who Shot Johnny Rock? was showcased at the 1991 Las Vegas Amusement Expo, at the time under the title Who Killed Johnny Rock?

== Reception ==
Reception

Review scores
Publication	Score
AllGame	1.5/5 (Sega CD); 2.5/5 (DVD Video); 1.5/5 (PC); 2.5/5 (Xbox)
Electronic Gaming Monthly	4.8/10 (3DO)
CD-i	82% (CDI)

Sinclair User magazine awarded the arcade version "Best Follow-Up Game" in 1991.

Electronic Gaming Monthly gave the 3DO version a 4.8 out of 10. They commented that the game's whodunnit concept is appealing, but that the graphics are poor by 3DO standards, the gameplay is frustrating, and the cursor moves too slow when using the control pad, making it impossible to progress in the game without a Gamegun, which was sold separately. Computer Gaming World said in June 1994 of the PC version that "The storyline and acting are decent for this sort of game, but the gameplay is simplistic to the extreme".

The game appeared on the 1992/1993 series of GamesMaster, with Tony Slattery playing. During the segment, Slattery stated that he hated video games, and later failed the challenge by shooting an innocent victim.

== See also ==
- List of LaserDisc games
