= Jeff Lee (video game artist) =

American video game designer (born 1952)

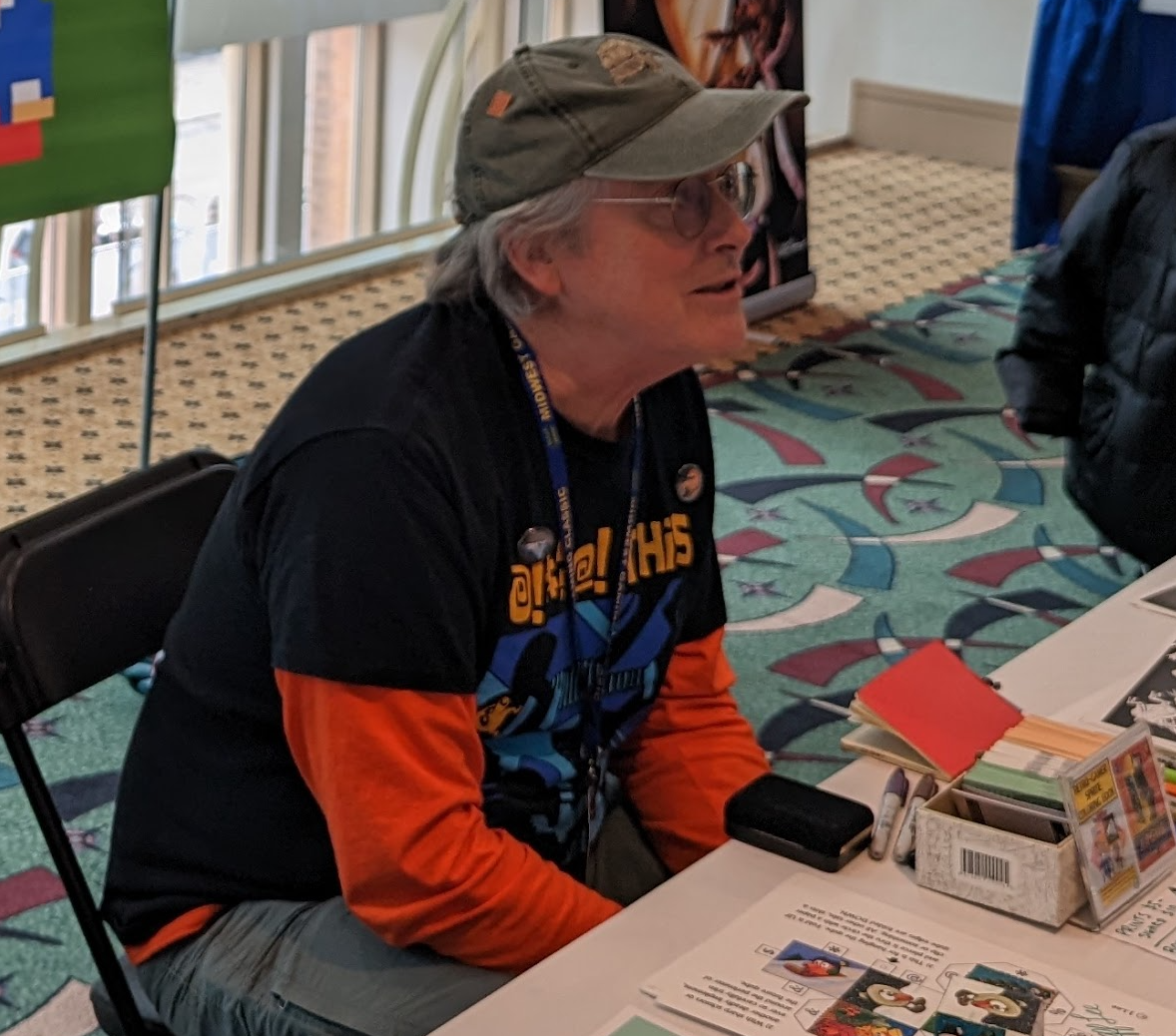
- Born: 1952 (age 73–74); Elkhart, Indiana
- Occupation: Video game artist
- Notable work: Krull; Q*Bert's Qubes; The Three Stooges; M.A.C.H. 3

Jeff Lee (born 1952 in Elkhart, Indiana) is the original video game artist at D. Gottlieb and Company. He is best known for creating the character of Q*bert, the popular arcade game from 1982.

== Biography ==
He also produced the video graphics for Cave Man (a video-pinball hybrid), Mad Planets, Krull, Q*Bert's Qubes, The Three Stooges, Quizimodo, M.A.C.H. 3 and Us vs Them. He also developed graphics for a number of video games that were never manufactured, such as Protector, Tylz and Wiz Warz. For independent arcade producers he created artwork for Lotto Fun and Double Cheese. During this period he also produced game graphics for the Sega Genesis system Home Alone, Premier Technology (Exterminator) and Maze Wars+ for MacroMind.

In print, Lee illustrated the playing cards of the 1986 publication of OD by the Avalon Hill Game Company. Lee illustrated an article by Marc Canter, "The New Workstation", which appeared in CD ROM: The New Papyrus (Microsoft Press, 1986). In 1993 Lee illustrated Bob Rumba's Standup Comix featuring Emo Philips and Judy Tenuta. His work also appeared in A Cook's Guide To Chicago (Lake Claremont Press, 2002) by Marilyn Pocius. In 2012 Lee illustrated the children's book The Train to Christmas Town, written by Peggy Ellis and published by Iowa Pacific Holdings.
