= Space Pirates (video game) =

1992 video game

- Arcade flyer
- Developer: American Laser Games
- Publisher: American Laser Games
- Director: Barry Kirk
- Producer: Les Wells
- Designers: Barry Kirk; Pierre Maloka
- Programmer: Pierre Maloka
- Writer: Jim Pattinson
- Platforms: Arcade, 3DO, MS-DOS, DVD
- Release: 1992: Arcade; 1995: 3DO
- Genre: Interactive movie Light gun shooter
- Mode: Single-player

Space Pirates is a live-action LaserDisc video game, released by American Laser Games for the arcade in 1992 and ported to MS-DOS computers in 1994 and the 3DO Interactive Multiplayer in 1995. The game was re-released for several platforms by Digital Leisure around 2003, with updated sound and video, among other American Laser Games titles.

== Plot ==
The player assumes the role of a star ranger (as in all American Laser Games releases except Who Shot Johnny Rock?, the player character's name is not given, and he is referred to throughout the game as "Star Ranger") who picks up and responds to a transmission by Ursula Skye, the commander of a starship called Colonial Star One. The SOS call lets the star ranger know that the ship has been invaded by an evil group called the Black Brigade, led by Captain Talon. As the entire colony on board the ship is in danger, the player answers the distress call. Following a short target practice tutorial, consisting of shooting at fast-moving asteroids, the player heads out to the Black Dragon to defeat the space pirates.

After the star ranger succeeds in freeing the captives aboard, including Commander Skye, the next task is to find and assemble the Star-Splitter Cannon, which, aside from its main component, requires three crystals to work: the Aqua Blue, the Crimson Red and the Emerald Green. Each of the components can be found on a separate planet, bringing the total of planets the player can visit in any order up to four. However, the crystals must be placed in the weapon in a specific order, which is given to the star ranger by Commander Skye. On the four planets, the star ranger encounters heavy opposition, but once the elements are collected, the final task is to destroy the Black Dragon with the Star-Splitter Cannon, then eliminating its captain.

== Gameplay ==
Space Pirates is similar to all other full motion video releases by American Laser Games in that the player rarely makes decisions other than selecting a planet and shooting villains. The action is propelled automatically, and only stops when one fails to kill a foe - who, in such cases, does not spare the player - or hits an innocent civilian or colonist. When this happens, energy units are deducted from the Star Ranger's life-support system, and a short clip is shown in which an old man - played by Ben Zeller, the prospector and stagecoach driver in Mad Dog McCree and Mad Dog II: The Lost Gold, respectively - gives general advice and scolds the player for the mistake made.

The Star Ranger's weapon of choice is a laser gun, which also happens to be used by the Black Brigade. The energy in the gun is limited, but can be quickly restored an infinite number of times. The gun is also used to choose paths and make simple decisions like shooting the appropriate spot in order to free prisoners. In the PC and 3DO versions of the game, the player can use either a mouse or a light gun to control the action; the 3DO version is also compatible with standard gamepads. The PC version lacks a two-player mode.

== Reception ==
GamePro gave the 3DO version a mixed review. They criticized that the targeting is inaccurate whether using the standard controller or Gamegun, though they nonetheless felt the gameplay to be "mindless fun". They particularly praised the game's futuristic setting, saying that the imaginative characters and scenery make the game much more visually appealing and atmospheric than most full motion video games. Next Generation complained that American Laser Games' usage of the same basic format for all their games was becoming tiresome, but acknowledged that the game had good quality video and enjoyable acting and gameplay. They scored it two out of five stars, deeming it "entertaining enough, in a brain-dead sort of way".

== See also ==
- List of LaserDisc games
