= Orbatak =

1994 video game

- Developer(s): American Laser Games
- Publisher(s): American Laser Games
- Platform(s): Arcade
- Release: 1994
- Genre(s): Action
- Mode(s): Single-player, multiplayer

Orbatak is a video game developed and published by American Laser Games for the arcade. A 3DO Interactive Multiplayer version was announced but never released.

== Gameplay ==
Orbatak is a time-based game where the player controls spheres using a track ball to fight other spheres.

== Reception ==
Next Generation reviewed the arcade version of the game, rating it three stars out of five, and stated that "American Laser Games should be congratulated on Orbatak; it's a refreshing change from the maddening outpour of driving, fighting, and shooting games."
