= List of LaserDisc games =

A LaserDisc game is a video game that uses pre-recorded video (either live-action or animation) played from a LaserDisc, either as the entirety of the graphics or as part of the graphics.

LaserDisc games
Game	Producer	Release date	Ref.
Astron Belt	Sega	May 1983 (Japan)	
Bega's Battle	Data East	June 1983 (USA)	
Dragon's Lair	Cinematronics	June 1983	
Laser Grand Prix	Taito	1983	
M.A.C.H. 3	Mylstar Electronics / Gottlieb	1983 (Note: Cockpit-model record reports September 1983.)	
Star Rider	Williams Electronics	November 1983	
Cliff Hanger	Stern Electronics	December 1983	
Cube Quest	Simutrek	December 1983	
Interstellar Laser Fantasy	Funai / Gakken	December 1983	
Space Ace	Cinematronics	December 1983 (Note: Announced in October 1983 with a limited release in December 1983 and a wide release in April 1984.)	
Galaxy Ranger	Sega	1984 (Note: 1984 for the US release and December 1983 for the Japanese title Star Blazer.)	
Firefox	Atari, Inc.	1984	
Goal to Go	Stern Electronics	February 1984	
Badlands	Konami	1984	
Cobra Command	Data East	May 1984	
Us vs. Them	Mylstar Electronics / Gottlieb	1984	
Super Don Quix-ote	Universal	November 1984	
Ninja Hayate	Taito	December 1984	
GP World	Sega	November 1984	
Thayer's Quest	RDI Video Systems	1984	
Esh's Aurunmilla	Funai	1984	
Space Battleship Yamato	Taito	July 1985	
Road Blaster	Data East	August 1985	
Time Gal	Taito	1985	
Freedom Fighter	Millennium Game Products	1987	
Mad Dog McCree	American Laser Games	1990	
Dragon's Lair II: Time Warp	Leland	1991	
Time Traveler	Sega	September 1991 (Japan)	
Who Shot Johnny Rock?	American Laser Games	1991	
Gallagher's Gallery	American Laser Games	1992	
Mad Dog II: The Lost Gold	American Laser Games	1992	
Space Pirates	American Laser Games	1992	
Galaxian3: Project Dragoon	Namco	December 1992 (Japan; Theater 6)	
Crime Patrol	American Laser Games	May 1993	
Crime Patrol 2: Drug Wars	American Laser Games	December 1993	
Street Viper	Nova Productions	1993	
Zorton Brothers / Los Justicieros	Picmatic	1993 or 1994	
Galaxian3: Attack of the Zolgear	Namco	July 1994 (Japan)	
COPS	Atari Games	1994	
Fast Draw Showdown	American Laser Games	1994	
Marbella Vice	Picmatic	1994	
Shootout at Old Tucson	American Laser Games	1994	
The Last Bounty Hunter	American Laser Games	1994	
Tierras Salvajes	Picmatic	1995	
