= Interstellar Laser Fantasy =

1983 LaserDisc arcade game

- Developer: Gakken
- Publisher: Funai
- Platform: Arcade
- Release: December 1983
- Genre: Shooter
- Mode: Single-player
- Arcade system: Funai LaserDisc hardware

Interstellar Laser Fantasy (Japanese: インターステラー・レーザー・ファンタジー), also known as Inter Stellar, is a LaserDisc arcade game released by Funai in 1983. The game combines pre-recorded animated LaserDisc footage with computer-generated gameplay elements, placing players in control of a spacecraft traveling through alien worlds while battling enemy forces. The LaserDisc background animation was created by the Japanese educational and media company Gakken.

Released during the brief arcade LaserDisc boom of the early 1980s, Interstellar Laser Fantasy was one of several titles inspired by the format popularized by games such as Astron Belt, Dragon's Lair, and Space Ace.

== Gameplay ==
In Interstellar Laser Fantasy, the player assumes the role of Frald Rancer, a starfighter pilot tasked with traveling to distant worlds and destroying an invading alien force.

The game uses LaserDisc-generated animated backgrounds depicting alien deserts, space caverns, futuristic cities, and outer-space environments. Unlike many scrolling shooters of the period, player movement is restricted primarily to horizontal movement at the bottom of the screen while enemy ships approach from the distance. A joystick controls movement and firing direction, while a secondary "Burn" button is used to attack certain ground targets.

The player's objective is to battle alien spacecraft and destroy enemy installations while progressing through a series of cinematic sequences. According to contemporary game descriptions, the ultimate goal is to locate and destroy the Delta UFO, the source of the alien invasion.

== Development ==
Interstellar Laser Fantasy was first shown by Funai at Tokyo's Amusement Machine Show (AM Show) in October 1983 and published in December 1983. The game's animated LaserDisc sequences were created by Gakken.

The game was released amid a surge of LaserDisc arcade titles that included Sega's Astron Belt, Cinematronics' Dragon's Lair, and Data East's Bega's Battle. Like these games, it used full-motion animated video stored on an optical LaserDisc while overlaying interactive graphics generated by arcade hardware.

== Reception ==
Contemporary reviews of Interstellar Laser Fantasy are scarce, and the game received significantly less coverage than better-known LaserDisc arcade releases such as Dragon's Lair and Space Ace.

Retrospective commentators have highlighted the game's distinctive science-fiction imagery and its blend of animated LaserDisc footage with sprite-based action. Preservation sources have noted similarities to Astron Belt, while also citing its more traditional shooter mechanics and unique audiovisual presentation.

The game has developed a reputation among arcade collectors as one of the rarer Japanese-produced LaserDisc arcade titles of the early 1980s.

== Legacy ==
A planned sequel of Interstellar Laser Fantasy called Interstellar Zangus was intended to be released in 1985 but it was canceled and no further LaserDisc games were released by Funai.

Alongside titles such as Astron Belt, Dragon's Lair, and Firefox, the game is preserved through modern arcade emulation projects and remains notable as part of the early LaserDisc arcade era.

== In media ==
Interstellar Laser Fantasy was a featured game on episode 95 of the 1980s television game show, Starcade.

== See also ==
- List of LaserDisc games
