= The Three Stooges (disambiguation) =

The Three Stooges were an American vaudeville and comedy team active from 1922 until 1970.

The Three Stooges may also refer to:

- The Three Stooges (2000 film), an American biographical television film
- The Three Stooges (2012 film), an American slapstick comedy film
- The Three Stooges (1984 video game), a 1984 arcade game by Mylstar Electronics
- The Three Stooges (video game), a 1987 video game by Cinemaware
