= Old Tucson Studios =

Film studio and theme park

Coordinates: 32.216103°N 111.130684°W

- Current logo

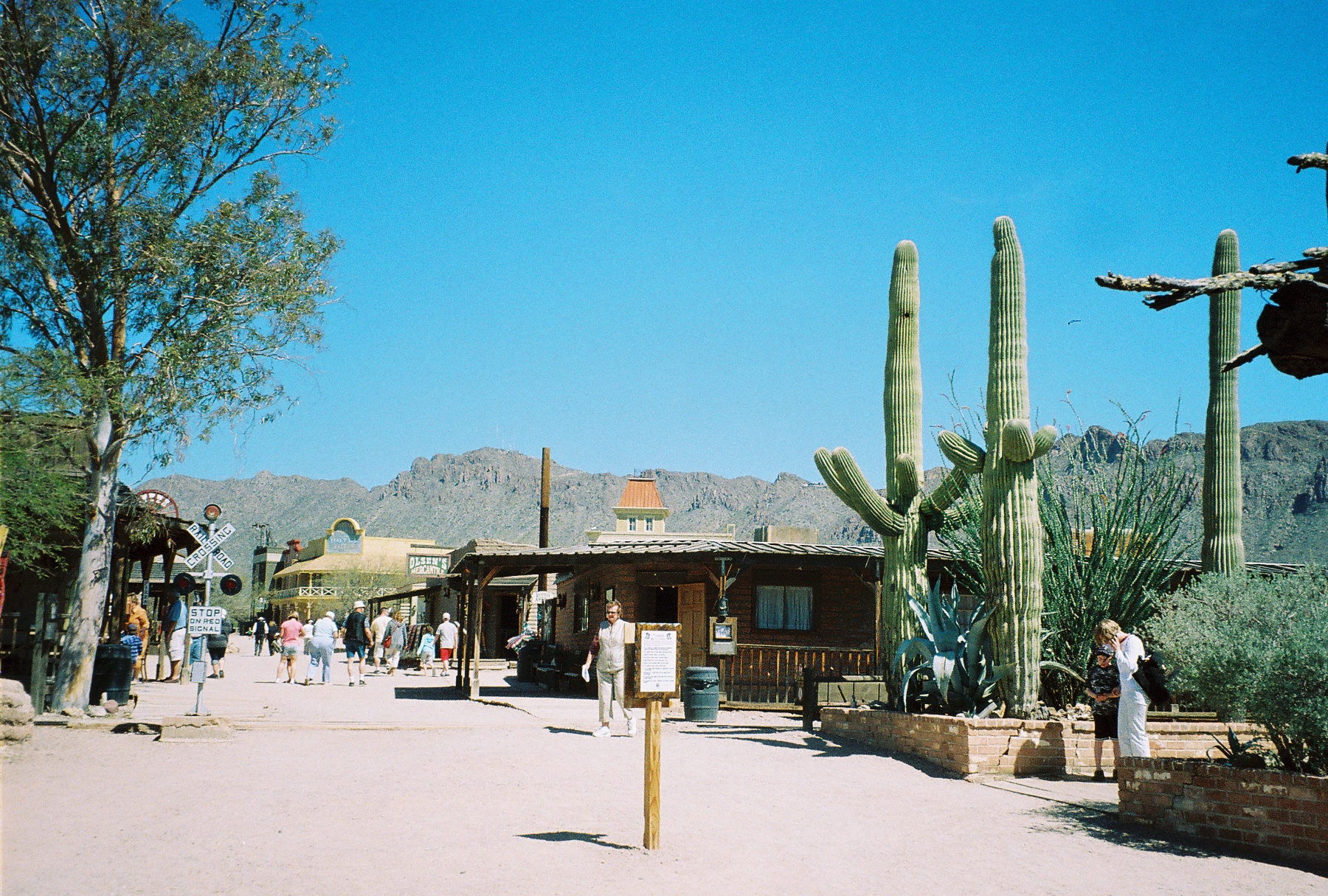
- A street view from the entrance of Old Tucson Studios
- Interactive map of Old Tucson Studios
- Location: 201 Kinney Rd, Tucson, AZ 85735
- Status: Operating
- Opened: 1939; 87 years ago
- Website: oldtucson.com

Old Tucson (a.k.a. Old Tucson Studios) is an American film studio and theme park just west of Tucson, Arizona, adjacent to the Tucson Mountains and close to the western portion of Saguaro National Park and near the Desert Museum. Built in 1939 for the movie Arizona (1940), it has been used for the filming location of many movies and television westerns since then, such as Gunfight at the O.K. Corral (1957), Rio Bravo (1959), El Dorado (1966), Little House on the Prairie TV series of the 1970s–1980s, The Young Riders TV series 1989–1992, the film Three Amigos! (1986), The High Chaparral (1967 to 1971) and the popular film Tombstone (1993). It was opened to the public in 1960 as a theme park with historical tours offered about the movies filmed there, along with live cast entertainment featuring stunt shows, shootouts, can-can shows as well as themed events. It is still a popular filming location used by Hollywood.

== Nick C. Hall, "founder" and "mayor" of Old Tucson ==
According to historian David Leighton, of the Arizona Daily Star, the person most responsible for the creation of Old Tucson was Nick Hall.

Nick C. Hall, a native of Missouri, arrived in downtown Tucson in late 1934 to manage the Santa Rita Hotel. He soon recognized the potential his new hometown had to offer the movie producers of Hollywood, particularly in the Western genre. He wanted to not only fill guest rooms in his hotel but bring work to the unemployed during the Great Depression.

By 1936, if not earlier, Hall was taking trips to Hollywood in order to entice film companies to make their movies in the Old Pueblo. He convinced production firms like Pickford-Lasky to shoot The Gay Desperado and M-G-M Pictures to film Let Freedom Ring (film) in town.

His biggest contribution to the Tucson film industry, however, was connected with the film Arizona (1940 film) starring Jean Arthur, based on the novel of the same name by Clarence Budington Kelland about pioneer Phoebe Titus in Tucson during the U.S. Civil War.

In early 1939, Wesley Ruggles, the director of the film and Claude Binyon, the script writer, both of Columbia Pictures, came to Tucson to do historical research for the upcoming filming and stayed at his hotel. This was likely when Hall first learned about the future filming of the movie, Arizona, then planned to be made in California, and likely when he first suggested filming the movie about Tucson should be done in Tucson.

After this, Hall worked behind the scenes to carry out his plan to ensure the film was shot in town, which included trips to Hollywood to meet with executives of Columbia Pictures. By July 1939, his work had paid off and it was announced that the filming would take place in Tucson and the local newspapers gave full credit to Hall for being responsible for this change in venue.

Hall would assist the production in many ways, from taking care of the cast and crew of the film at his hotel, to chaperoning Columbia crew members to and from the hotel to the future Old Tucson site as it was constructed as a replica of what Tucson looked like in the 1860s, and even acting as public relations person in dealing with the news media.

In August 1939, the cast of the film “elected” Hall the mayor of Old Tucson, half in jest and half in seriousness because he had been responsible for bringing the filming of the movie Arizona (1940 film) to Tucson, which resulted in the construction of the Old Tucson movie set and in appreciation for taking care of the needs of the cast and crew. A couple months later, Arizona Gov. Robert Taylor Jones proclaimed Hall the honorary mayor of Old Tucson, which at this point was an adobe ghost town since the start of World War II, had delayed the start of filming.

After several months, in April 1940, the cast and crew returned to the Santa Rita Hotel and essentially took it over, setting up production, timekeeping and business offices, along with camera dark rooms, cutting rooms and even a projection theater.

The same month, at the official dedication of the Old Tucson movie set, Hall as mayor of Old Tucson presented the key to the city to Ruggles. A month later, acting in the same role he presided over the opening of the real but temporary Old Tucson Post Office.

After several months of filming it was completed and on November 15, 1940, the world premiere of the movie Arizona occurred in Tucson at four movie houses — Rialto Theatre, State Theatre, Fox Theatre and the Lyric Theatre.

Nick C. Hall, still to today is considered the honorary mayor of Old Tucson. Mr. Hall will be honored by Old Tucson with the naming of the Nick C. Hall Ramada, an idea originally conceived by historian David Leighton.

== Early history ==
Old Tucson was originally built in 1939 by Columbia Pictures on a Pima County-owned site as a replica of 1860s’ era Tucson for the movie Arizona (1940), starring William Holden and Jean Arthur. Workers built more than 50 buildings in 40 days. Many of those structures are still standing.

After Arizona completed filming, the location lay dormant for several years, until the filming of The Bells of St. Mary's (1945), starring Bing Crosby and Ingrid Bergman. Other early movies filmed on this set included The Last Round-Up (1947) with Gene Autry and Winchester '73 (1950) with James Stewart and The Last Outpost (1951) with Ronald Reagan. The 1950s saw the filming of Gunfight at the O.K. Corral (1957), The Lone Ranger and the Lost City of Gold (1958), Cimarron (1960), Last Train from Gun Hill (1959), and Rio Bravo (1959) among others.

== Open to the public ==
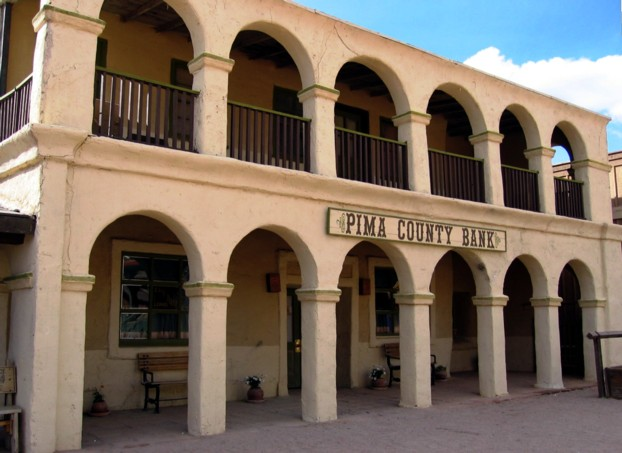
The fictional Pima County Bank used in the daily bank robbery show

In 1959, entrepreneur Robert Shelton leased the property from Pima County and began to restore the aging facility. Old Tucson re-opened in 1960, as both a film studio and a theme park. The park grew building by building with each movie filmed on its dusty streets. John Wayne starred in four movies at Old Tucson. Rio Bravo (1959) added a saloon, bank building and doctor's office; McLintock! (1963) added the McLintock Hotel; El Dorado (1966) brought a renovation of the storefronts on Front Street; and with Rio Lobo (1970) came a cantina, a granite-lined creek, a jail and a ranch house.

In 1968, a 13,000 square foot (1,208 square meter) sound stage was built to give Old Tucson greater movie-making versatility. The first film to use the sound stage was Young Billy Young (1968), starring Robert Mitchum and Angie Dickinson.

The park also began adding tours, rides and shows for the entertainment of visitors, most notably gunfights staged in the "streets" by stunt performers. One of the rides is a 2 ft (610 mm) narrow-gauge railroad powered by two Chance Rides C.P. Huntington train sets, which encircles most of the property.

Old Tucson served as an ideal location for shooting scenes for TV series like NBC's The High Chaparral (1967–1971) with Leif Erickson and Cameron Mitchell where the ranch house survived the 1995 fire; the 1970s–1980s series Little House on the Prairie with Michael Landon, Kung Fu, and later Father Murphy, featuring Merlin Olsen and Petrocelli (1974–1976) used the site. Three Amigos was a popular comedy movie shot there in the 1980s with Steve Martin, utilizing the church set. From 1989 to 1992, the western show The Young Riders filmed here and at the Mescal, Arizona sister site. The main street appears prominently in 1990s westerns such as Tombstone (1993) with Kurt Russell and Val Kilmer. A partial mirror set exists at Mescal and is featured in The Quick and the Dead (1995), with Sharon Stone and Gene Hackman which filmed all of the town of Redemption scenes at the studios.

== Fire ==
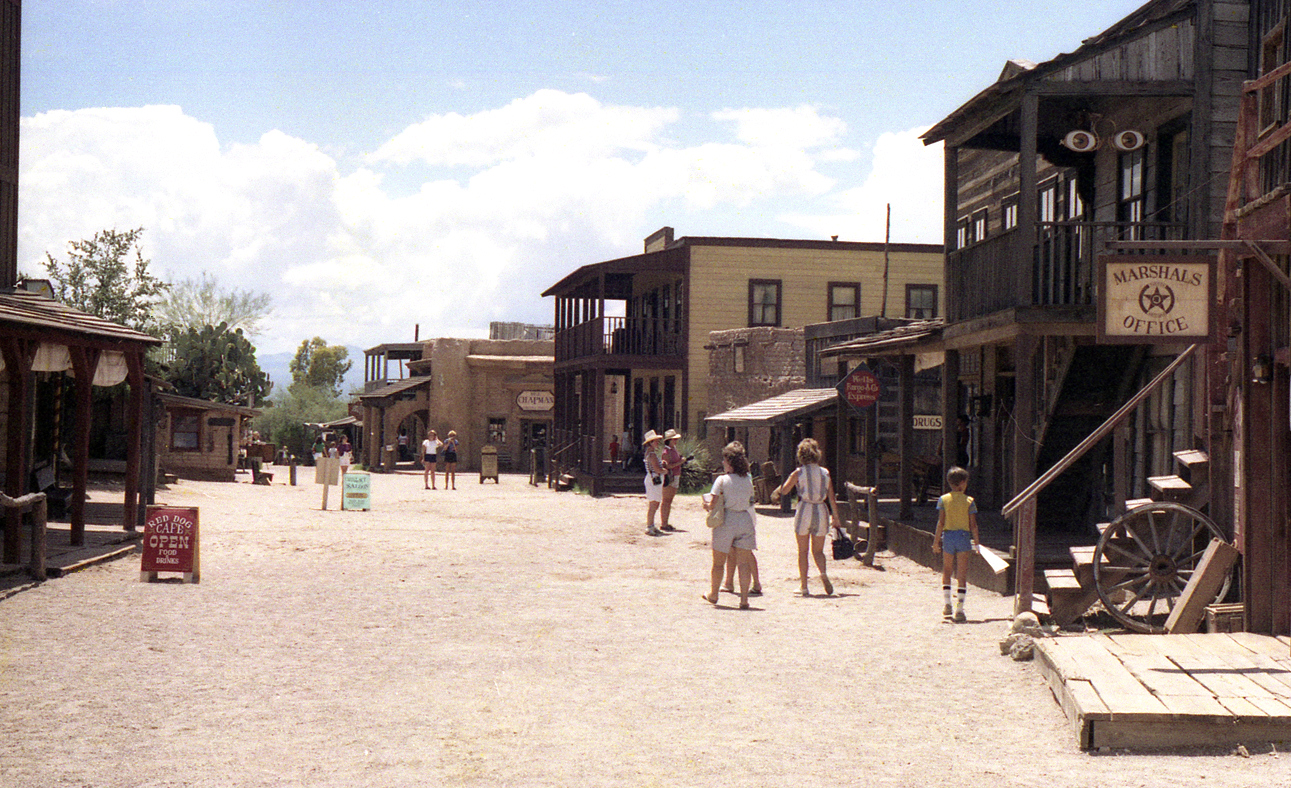
Old Tucson buildings in 1984, before the 1995 conflagration

On April 24, 1995, a fire destroyed much of Old Tucson Studios. Buildings, costumes, and memorabilia were lost in the blaze. Among the memorabilia destroyed was the wardrobe from Little House on the Prairie. Also lost in the blaze was the only copy of a short film about the history of Old Tucson Studios. This film included rare behind-the-scenes footage of stars such as William Holden, John Wayne, and Angie Dickinson. The Reno, a steam locomotive from the Virginia and Truckee Railroad on static display in the park, was also badly damaged.

Fire control efforts were hampered by high winds. Most of the buildings in the studio were classified as "Temporary Structures," meaning fire prevention devices such as sprinklers were not required. A large propane tank, stashes of black powder used in staging gunfights, and a diesel fuel tank demanded the attention of firefighters and much of the scarce water supply. So much water was used in the attempt to prevent an explosion that the surrounding areas became flooded, further impeding the firefighters as they attempted to wade through the mud. After four hours of firefighting, the flames were extinguished. Damage was estimated to be around $10 million ($21.5 million in 2026), with 25 buildings destroyed; there were no human casualties.

After 20 months of reconstruction, Old Tucson re-opened its doors on January 2, 1997. The sets that were lost were not recreated; instead, entirely new buildings were constructed, and the streets were widened. The Reno locomotive was cosmetically restored before the filming of Wild Wild West, in which it was featured as Union Pacific 119 in the scene at the driving of the final spike of the first transcontinental railroad, but was subsequently used in an explosion in the scene and is in need of additional restoration. The sound stage was not rebuilt. Film production at Old Tucson was seriously affected by the fire. In 2003, Old Tucson reduced its hours of operation, opening from 10 a.m. to 4 p.m. Focusing on seasonal events, Old Tucson hosts the popular Nightfall event for Halloween which runs through the month of October, Wednesday through Sunday nights.

== Recent history ==
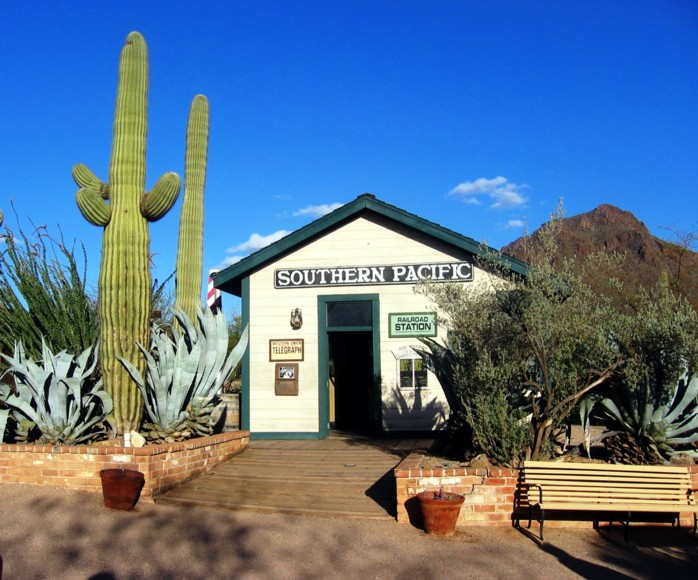
A railroad station building near the Old Tucson Studios entrance

In 2011, Old Tucson embarked on a project to build new movie-quality sets that fill out the park, and restore the pre-fire feel of close-together buildings, providing the look and depth of a genuine old west town circa 1865–1900. “After the rebuild of Old Tucson following the 1995 fire, the town just didn’t have the same look and feel,” says Old Tucson CEO and General Manager Pete Mangelsdorf. “We started discussions with Bob Shelton several years ago to develop a plan to fill the empty space in Town Square with movie-quality sets that bring the magic back.”

The Heritage Square Project, a 5,000-square-foot spread with three new streets lined with 12 new buildings, was completed in November 2011 at an estimated cost of $300,000. The design and construction of the new sets was led by Production Designer Gene Rudolf, credited with creating sets for movies including Young Guns II (1990), The Great Gatsby (1974), The Right Stuff (1983), Raging Bull (1980), Marathon Man (1976), and Three Days of the Condor (1975). The project added dressmaker shops, a general store and a blacksmith, and are part of "living history" presentations. One of the goals of the Heritage Project was to add "more programs that have to do with the different cultural aspects, the Hispanic culture, the Chinese culture, the Native American culture," said Mangelsdorf. Along those lines, another new exhibit now open to the public features a Tohono Oʼodham village as it would have appeared in the 1860s. It includes traditional houses, a garden and other facets of village life.

On Tuesday, September 8, 2020, Old Tucson, the Western-themed attraction that was the filming location of more than 400 feature-films and television shows, closed indefinitely, with its future to be determined by Pima County.

The decision to close the Arizona landmark "was made with a heavy heart," according to Old Tucson general manager Terry Verhage, who said in a news release that the theme park would have remained in business "if not for the COVID-19 pandemic."

“We know how important Old Tucson is to our community, guests and employees,” he said. “We did everything possible to keep our loyal fans safe when we were open, but the ongoing COVID-19 public health protocols and restrictions limited park attendance to the point where Old Tucson could no longer stay in business.”

Pima County took over responsibility for the theme park on September 14, 2020, and "will seek ideas from potential operators and lessors about what Old Tucson could be in the future," the news release said.

On August 24, 2021, the steam locomotive Reno was acquired by the revived Virginia and Truckee Railroad and was trucked off the property. It arrived in Virginia City, Nevada, for the first time since 1938, two days later.

While closed, Pima County Administrator said the county has invested over $1 million on upgrading the site and repairing neglected items to prepare the facility for a new operator.

On April 5, 2022, Pima County selected American Heritage Railways (AHR) as the new operators of Old Tucson, a.k.a. Old Tucson Studios. It would be operated as Old Tucson Entertainment, LLC. The famous sister-site, Mescal Movie Set, was not part of the deal and will not be operated by the new AHR operators.

This historic movie location and theme park reopened on October 6, 2022, with the popular "Nightfall at Old Tucson" event followed by a new Christmas-themed event called "Yuletide at Old Tucson" on November 25, 2022. John Harper serves as vice president and Chief Operating Officer of American Heritage Railways and will oversee the property's Executive Team, General Managers, and key employees. John has over 10 years in the historic preservation industry as well. They plan to utilize the facility not only as a theme-park but also reinstate its history as a filming location with the addition of sets, backdrops, sound stage, and pre- and post-production facilities in 2023.

In July 2022, the Arizona state legislature passed the Arizona Film Tax Incentive bill which would encourage productions to return to facilities like Old Tucson. The passage of this bill is likely to increase film production at Old Tucson. In September 2022, they began fielding offers for film and TV series and had two films shoot on location in 2023.

In June 2026, American Heritage Railways (AHR) opted not to renew their lease. Pima County states the remaining scheduled events will continue through the end of 2026 with AHR officially ending their lease by April 2027. Pima County has begun the process of finding another operator for this historic movie location.

== Movies filmed at Old Tucson ==
Many films, not all of them Westerns, were shot at Old Tucson Studios in whole or in part including the following:

- 1940: Arizona
- 1945: The Bells of St. Mary's
- 1947: The Last Round-up
- 1950: Winchester '73
- 1950: Broken Arrow
- 1951: The Last Outpost
- 1955: Strange Lady in Town
- 1955: Ten Wanted Men
- 1955: The Violent Men
- 1956: Backlash
- 1956: The Broken Star
- 1956: Walk the Proud Land
- 1957: 3:10 to Yuma
- 1957: Gunfight at the O.K. Corral
- 1957: The Guns of Fort Petticoat
- 1957: Carbine Webb and the Four Sisters
- 1957: Tale of Consequence
- 1958: Buchanan Rides Alone
- 1958: The Badlanders
- 1958: Gunsmoke in Tucson
- 1958: The Lone Ranger and the Lost City of Gold
- 1959: Last Train from Gun Hill
- 1959: Rio Bravo
- 1959: The Hangman
- 1960: Cimarron
- 1960: Heller in Pink Tights
- 1961: The Deadly Companions
- 1961: Sounds of Arizona
- 1961: A Thunder of Drums
- 1962: Young Guns of Texas
- 1963: McLintock!
- 1963: Lilies of the Field
- 1964: The Outrage
- 1965: Arizona Raiders
- 1965: The Great Sioux Massacre
- 1965: The Reward
- 1966: El Dorado
- 1966: Johnny Tiger
- 1966: Pistolero
- 1967: Hombre
- 1967: Return of the Gunfighter
- 1967: The Last Challenge
- 1967: The Way West
- 1967: A Time for Killing
- 1967: The Long Ride Home
- 1967: Rango
- 1968: The Mini-Skirt Mob
- 1968: Lonesome Cowboys
- 1969: Heaven with a Gun
- 1969: Young Billy Young
- 1969: Again a Love Story
- 1969: The Mountain Men
- 1969: Charro!
- 1969: Whatever Happened to Aunt Alice
- 1970: Dirty Dingus Magee
- 1970: C.C. & Company
- 1970: Monte Walsh
- 1970: Rio Lobo
- 1971: Wild Rovers
- 1971: The Animals
- 1971: Ballad of the Old West
- 1971: Bearcats!
- 1971: Dirty Little Billy
- 1971: Forgotten Man
- 1971: Gunfight at the OK Corral
- 1971: Moments of Destiny – The OK Corral
- 1971: Scandalous John
- 1971: Showdown at the O.K Corral
- 1971: A Ton of Grass Goes to Pot
- 1971: Yuma
- 1971: Death of a Gunfighter
- 1972: Joe Kidd
- 1972: Moonfire
- 1972: Rage
- 1972: Night of the Lepus
- 1972: Pocket Money
- 1972: The Legend of Nigger Charley
- 1972: The Life and Times of Judge Roy Bean
- 1973: Guns of a Stranger
- 1973: Boomtown Band and Cattle Company
- 1973: The Man Who Loved Cat Dancing
- 1973: Outlaw Legacy
- 1973: Westworld
- 1974: Death Wish
- 1974: A Knife for the Ladies
- 1974: The Trial of Billy Jack
- 1974: Abduction of St. Anne
- 1974: Backtrack
- 1974: The Gun and the Pulpit
- 1974: The Hanged Man
- 1974: Mark of Zorro
- 1974: Pray for the Wildcats
- 1974: Wish You Were Here
- 1975: Posse
- 1975: Go USA
- 1975: Katherine
- 1976: Hawmps!
- 1976: The Last Hard Men
- 1976: The Lizard
- 1976: The Quest
- 1976: Royce
- 1976: A Star is Born
- 1976: Tales of Nunundaga
- 1976: Wanted: The Sundance Woman
- 1976: The Outlaw Josey Wales
- 1977: Another Man, Another Woman
- 1977: Harlem Globetrotters
- 1977: The Incredible Rocky Mountain Race
- 1977: Stones
- 1978: The American Cowboy
- 1978: Wild and Wooly
- 1978: Go West Young Girl
- 1978: The Sacketts
- 1979: The Villain
- 1979: Authentic Life of Billy the Kid
- 1979: Buffalo Soldiers
- 1979: The Dooley Brothers
- 1979: Frisco Kid
- 1979: Hunter's Moon
- 1979: Japanese Quiz Show
- 1979: Wild Wild West Revisited
- 1979: The Gambler
- 1980: Tom Horn
- 1980: Death Valley
- 1980: High Noon part II: The Return of Will Kane
- 1980: More Wild, Wild West
- 1980: That's Incredible: Lost Dog
- 1981: Father Murphy
- 1981: The Cannonball Run
- 1980: American Frontier
- 1980: The Ransom of Red Chief
- 1983: Calamity Jane
- 1983: Cannon Ball Run Part II
- 1983: I Married Wyatt Earp
- 1983: September Gun
- 1983: The Reflection Natas
- 1984: The Assumption
- 1984: Flashpoint
- 1984: Little Arliss
- 1984: Revenge of the Nerds
- 1985: The Ascension
- 1985: Centurion Odyssey
- 1985: Cowboy Up
- 1985: Dream West
- 1985: Go West-Sing West
- 1985: Jackals
- 1985: Le Grand Rallye
- 1986: Buckeye and Blue
- 1986: Here a Thief, There a Thief
- 1986: It's the Girl in the Red Truck
- 1986: Three Amigos
- 1986: Stagecoach (TV movie)
- 1987: Desperado #1
- 1987: Desperado #2
- 1987: Nobody Likes It Hot
- 1987: Poker Alice
- 1987: Walker
- 1987: The Quick and the Dead (TV movie)
- 1988: Ghost Town
- 1988: Once Upon a Texas Train
- 1988: Red River
- 1988: Return of the Desperado
- 1988: South of Reno
- 1988: Stones for Ibarra
- 1989: Desperado Badland Justice
- 1989: Laughing Dead
- 1989: Law at Randado
- 1989: Third Degree Burn
- 1989: Gore Vidal's Billy the Kid
- 1990: El Diablo
- 1990: Young Guns II
- 1990: The Highwaymen
- 1990: Two-Fisted Tales
- 1990: The Legend of Grizzly Adams
- 1991: Four Eyes and Six Guns
- 1991: Gunsmoke III: To the Last Man
- 1991: Kid
- 1992: California Dreaming
- 1992: Ghosts of Ruby
- 1992: Legends of the West
- 1992: Newton's Apple
- 1992: Showdown
- 1992: Stay Tuned
- 1993: Nemesis (filmed scenes in 1992)
- 1993: Tombstone
- 1993: Geronimo
- 1993: Gunsmoke V: One Man's Justice
- 1993: Horse Opera
- 1993: Marshal Charley
- 1993: Music of the West
- 1993: Posse
- 1994: The Last Bounty Hunter
- 1994: The West
- 1994: Terminal Velocity
- 1994: Lightning Jack
- 1995: Hard Bounty
- 1995: The Quick and the Dead
- 1995: Legend
- 1995: Timemaster
- 1995: Under the Hula Moon
- 1997: Buffalo Soldiers
- 1997: Los Locos
- 2000: South of Heaven, West of Hell
- 2002: Legend of the Phantom Rider
- 2003: Ghost Rock
- 2003: Gunfight at the OK Corral
- 2004: Treasure of the Seven Mummies
- 2005: Miracle at Sage Creek
- 2005: Cutoff
- 2005: Dual
- 2005: Ghost Town
- 2005: Wild West Tech – Gang Technology
- 2006: The Dead Evil Seven Mummies
- 2006: Wild and the West
- 2007: Legend of Pearl Hart
- 2007: The Wild West
- 2008: Mad, Mad Wagon Party
- 2011: To Kill a Memory
- 2014: Hot Bath an’ a Stiff Drink
- 2019: The Legend of 5 Mile Cave
- 2023: Among Wolves
- 2023: Long Shadows

Some scenes from the 1994 arcade game Lethal Enforcers II: Gun Fighters from Konami were also shot at Old Tucson Studios, along with The Last Bounty Hunter, Fast Draw Showdown, and Shootout at Old Tucson by American Laser Games.

== Television ==
Many television series and television movies have had at least one episode filmed at Old Tucson in whole or in part, including the following:

- 1958–1961: Wanted Dead or Alive
- 1959–1965: Rawhide
- 1962: Have Gun – Will Travel
- 1963: Wagon Train
- 1966–1969: Death Valley Days
- 1966–1971: The High Chaparral
- 1966/1971–1972: Bonanza
- 1967: Dundee and the Culhane
- 1971: Bearcats! (either the TV movie title that started the series or at least one episode)
- 1972–1974: Gunsmoke
- 1972–1975: Kung Fu
- 1974–1975: Petrocelli
- 1975–1976: The Young Pioneers
- 1977–1979: How The West Was Won
- 1977–1983: Little House on the Prairie
- 1978: The New Maverick (TV movie)
- 1980: Hart to Hart
- 1981-1983: Father Murphy
- 1984: Highway to Heaven
- 1984: Ripley's Believe it or Not
- 1984: Little House on the Prairie: Bless All the Dear Children (TV movie)
- 1985–1988: Webster
- 1987: Highway to Heaven (episode: "Why Punish the Children")
- 1987: Reading Rainbow (episode: "Meanwhile Back at the Ranch")
- 1987: Love Among Thieves (TV movie)
- 1988–1991: The Young Riders
- 1988: One Life to Live
- 1989: America's Most Wanted
- 1989: WWF Prime Time Wrestling
- 1990: Unsolved Mysteries
- 1998: Magnificent Seven

== See also ==
- Old Vegas
- Goldfield Ghost Town
