= McKenzie & Co. =

1995 full-motion video game

- Publisher: Her Interactive
- Platforms: Windows, Mac OS
- Release: Windows; November 24, 1995; Mac OS; February 1996
- Genre: Dating sim
- Mode: Single-player

McKenzie & Co. is a full-motion video CD-ROM dating sim game, with dress-up gameplay released by Her Interactive in 1995, designed to be played by girls. It was available for Windows 3.1, Windows 95 and Mac OS. A 3DO Interactive Multiplayer version was planned but never released. "McKenzie" is the name of the protagonist's Geo Tracker—an acronym of Marvelous, Cool, Kinetic movement, Ever-lasting friendship, Non-conformist, Zany, Ingenious, and Empowered.

== Development ==
The game was developed with the active involvement of the Albuquerque Independent School District. Through the district, American Laser Games' vice-president of marketing Patricia Flannigan distributed surveys, conducted interviews, and held play study groups in order to design a game that her daughters would play.

The game included a music CD featuring several bands from New Mexico, such as Poet, Cool Notes, Tee Green from the UK, and the Strawberry Zots, whose music video "And You" was also included. Music tracks from composer Jean Rene De Rascon were also included.

== Gameplay ==
The plot revolves around being a high school junior and trying to find a date for the prom. At the beginning of the game, the player chooses a character, cheerleader Kim or actress Carly. The opening scene is in the character's bedroom, where all six members of McKenzie & Co are having a sleepover. They look through the yearbook and then ask the player to choose between two guys. For Kim, the choice is between Brett and Steven, while Carly chooses between Derrick and Brandon. The rest of the game is spent trying to get the designated love interest to ask the player character to the prom.

Both characters have their own rooms in the game where they can read magazines, read their diaries, listen to voice messages, call people, apply makeup, or put on clothes.

When they are away from their rooms, the rest of the gameplay is through short video clips. The player must choose an option of what to do or say at the given time, and the videos will show the outcome. Some choices will lead to the same eventual path as others, and some choices will result in a game over.

At the end of the game, if all goes well, the player's date will pick them up and the gameplay will finish with the school yearbook, where the player can see a picture of the player character and their date at prom.

== Reaction ==
Major publishers declined to distribute the title because they did not believe there was a market for girl-oriented games. However, the 5-CD game was successful, and sold 40,000 units by early 1998, and over 80,000 copies in its lifetime. An expansion pack, McKenzie & Co: More Friends, featured new male characters James and Aaron. The expansion pack included 3 CDs - an upgrade of the main game and a disc for each new character.

McKenzie & Co. received a lot of press attention for being one of the few girl-oriented games developed in the United States. Her Interactive was one of the first companies in the United States established to specifically develop games for the female market.

While American Laser Games, the company that founded Her Interactive, claimed feminist motivations, aspiring to help lead girls down the path of computers and technology, the game was not uniformly well received. Some expressed concerns that it pushed a stereotype of what teenage girls are like, with its emphasis on makeup, shopping, and dating. The Chicago Tribune called the game's objective, getting a prom date, "rather dubious". Salon characterized the game as "much-reviled" in 1999. Electric Playground said the game was "a cardboard creation which suggests a bizarre cross between "Sweet Valley High" and "Clueless" and exudes the depth of a puddle." PC Joker gave the game a score of 51%.

== See also ==
- Dating sim
- American Laser Games

== Related links ==
- http://www.csoon.com/issue14/mckenzie.htm —A review
- http://sherigranerray.com/?p=15 —memoir of Sheri Graner Ray, one of the programmers
