= Texas Hold'em Tournament =

2009 video game

- Developer: Digital Leisure
- Publisher: Digital Leisure
- Platform: Wii (WiiWare)
- Release: PAL: March 27, 2009; NA: June 1, 2009
- Genres: Simulation, Card Game
- Modes: Single-player, multiplayer

Texas Hold'em Tournament is a poker video game developed by Digital Leisure for WiiWare. The game was released in PAL regions on March 27, 2009 and in North America on June 1, 2009.

== Overview ==
The game sees players competing in Texas hold 'em poker tournaments, either online or offline. The game supports up to 5 additional players online via the Nintendo Wi-Fi Connection, worldwide leaderboards and the use of Miis.

== Reception ==
WiiWare World felt the game was a safe adaptation of the card game and appreciated the inclusion of online play, though they were left unimpressed by the basic presentation. IGN called it a no-frills, run-of-the-mill adaptation, and felt that its presentation was "unbelievably ghetto" and the graphics "ugly even for a Nintendo 64 game". Wiiloveit.com acknowledged that it's easy to "write it off for its simplistic presentation", however it was stated that the game undeniably provides "great value" especially due to the replayable online mode.
