= The Incredible Maze =

2008 video game

- Developer(s): Digital Leisure
- Publisher(s): Digital Leisure; Gameloft (JP)
- Platform(s): Wii (WiiWare)
- Release: NA: October 20, 2008; EU: October 24, 2008; JP: December 8, 2009
- Genre(s): Puzzle
- Mode(s): Single-player

The Incredible Maze is a WiiWare game developed and published by Digital Leisure. The game is compatible with both the Wii Remote and the Wii Balance Board.

It was released in North America on October 20, 2008, in Europe on October 24, 2008, and in Japan on December 8, 2009.

== Gameplay ==
The Incredible Maze involves the player navigating a ball through many different mazes by either twisting the Wii Remote or shifting their weight on the Balance Board to tilt the maze around the ball. The player must avoid letting the ball fall into holes or slipping off the sides while also using objects such as jump pads, sliding blocks and warp zones to get them through the maze.

The game also features a Challenge mode, where the player hunts for gems within a time limit, and a Time Attack mode in which they must find their way through the maze in the fastest time possible.

== Reception ==
Most reviews were generally negative against the game, with it scoring a 27 from 6 reviews at Metacritic. WiiWare World scored The Incredible Maze a 2/10, calling it a "legitimate mess" with poorly designed stages, unreliable controls that left the game "practically unplayable with a Wii Remote" and an amateurish presentation with "rudimentary" graphics they felt were "some sort of bad joke". IGN scored the game a 2.5/10, calling it "unbearably bad" and harshly criticized the sensitive control schemes and basic presentation of the game. NGamer called it "a hairy wart on WiiWare's beautiful face".

In contrast, Review Busters scored the game an 8/10, calling it "a basic game that is fun for an hour or two at a time ... For what you pay for, there is enough here for a lot of fun with your friends and family." Glide Underground gave it the Editor's Choice award, noting that "For a solid and innovative take on a classic game that expands it to a whole new wealth of possibilities. I don't see a downside here, and it's certainly worth the risk, especially for parents worrying about their young kids getting "violent" games. Plus, it's something else to do with your Wii Fit board. Pick it up if you have the chance." Frictionless Insight scored the game 2.5/5, saying that "The Incredible Maze is a bare-bones entrant into the tilting maze genre, but has two things going for it. The Incredible Maze costs little, at 500 points ($5), and so is easy to pick up and play without having to make a larger (guilty) purchase."
