= Blood Bath at Red Falls =

1995 video game

- Developer: UnderWorld Software
- Publisher: American Laser Games
- Platforms: Windows, Macintosh
- Release: October 31, 1995
- Genre: First-person shooter
- Mode: Single-player

Blood Bath at Red Falls (also known as Blood Bath) is a video game developed by the American studio UnderWorld Software and published by American Laser Games. It was released on October 31, 1995.

== Plot ==
In Blood Bath at Red Falls, players take on the role of a sheriff in a first-person shooter set in a crime-ridden town.

== Gameplay ==
Criminals pop up from behind cover, and the player must shoot them before they shoot back. The player does not move and relies solely on speed and precision. Enemies range from escaped convicts in orange jumpsuits to their liberators in green and black, all animated via motion-capture.

On each screen the player must eliminate enough enemies until told the "Area Secured," then moved to the next. Some foes surrender with hands raised—spare them, and the player is rewarded with power-ups like extra lives, ammunition, or better weapons. The game offers three difficulty levels—Easy, Bring It On, and Bad Ass—each with its own Hall of Fame tracking accuracy and kill counts. Graphically, the game leans into its name: blood sprays from wounds, bullet holes scar the scenery, and the digitized visuals are drawn from live-action footage. Sound design features gunfire and death groans, with QuickTime cutscenes.

== Development ==
Blood Bath at Red Falls was developed by UnderWorld Software, a company based in Marina del Rey, California. It was the first release from the studio. The game was published by American Laser Games.

== Reception ==
Reception

Review scores
Publication	Score
All Game Guide	3.5/5
The Electric Playground	9/10

All Game Guide said "Though the game's realism might be disturbing for some, it will keep you hyped and on the edge of your seat".

Wayne Bremser from MacHome Journal said "Blood Bath takes a traditional arcade stance on game 'plot': there is a plot, if you're interested, but you certainly aren't forced to watch it. Overall, this is a great simple shoot-em-up game that will be a nice contrast if your CD collection has drifted towards moody, non-violent Myst-type games."

Dimension 3 gave it a 92% rating as a game that's "actually fun to play".

Games Domain said "Overall Blood Bath has the feel of a shareware game. Its digitized video targets brings it one step above Prairie Dog Hunt. At $15 this might be a fun diversion but at $25 you can find a lot better games with more long term appeal".
