= Sudoku Challenge! =

2008 video game

- Developer: Digital Leisure
- Publisher: Digital Leisure
- Platforms: Wii (WiiWare), Nintendo DSi (DSiWare)
- Release: WiiWare: NA: November 24, 2008; PAL: December 19, 2008; DSiWare: NA: November 30, 2009; PAL: May 14, 2010
- Genre: Puzzle
- Mode: Single-player

Sudoku Challenge! is a WiiWare sudoku game developed by Digital Leisure. The game was released in North America on November 24, 2008 and in the PAL region on December 19, 2008 and costs 500 Wii Points. The DSiWare version has been released in North America on November 30, 2009 and in the PAL region on May 14, 2010.

The game includes three difficulty levels, Original and Grand Sudoku game modes (where the player has to complete five intersecting Sudoku boards at the same time), and over 100,000,000 sudoku puzzles.

== Reception ==
WiiWare World gave the game 6 out of 10, believing Sudoku Challenge to be an acceptable puzzler but with still room for improvement. Commenting that the presentation was functional and that most players will be satisfied with what was on offer, with the sudoku puzzles varying in difficulty to challenge players of all skill levels, they were also impressed with the number of puzzles included and claimed that, at 10 minutes a puzzle, it would take a player at least 1900 years to complete all the puzzles included on the game.
