= Digital Leisure =

Canadian publisher of software

Digital Leisure, Inc.
- Type: Private
- Industry: Video games
- Founded: Ontario, Canada (August 1997)
- Headquarters: Richmond Hill, Ontario, Canada
- Key people: David Foster; Paul Gold
- Website: www.digitalleisure.com

Digital Leisure, Inc. is a Canadian software publisher. The company formed in 1997 with the aim to acquire, remaster and publish numerous classic video-based arcade games such as the Don Bluth animated titles Dragon's Lair, Dragon's Lair II: Time Warp and Space Ace. Over time, they have acquired the publishing rights to various full motion video games, which they have re-released on a variety of modern formats. In more recent years, they have produced original games as well.

== History ==
Digital Leisure was formed by former employees of Readysoft. In its initial years of existence, Digital Leisure acquired the publishing rights to many full motion video games. In addition to the Don Bluth titles, the company acquired the North American rights to publish Tender Loving Care, an interactive movie on DVD-ROM and CD-ROM featuring Academy Award nominee John Hurt in early 1999.

In early 2000, the company added the development and publishing rights of Dragon's Lair creator Rick Dyer's arcade game Hologram Time Traveler which was released in the fall of 2000 on multiple formats. The game was the first arcade game to simulate 3D holographic images. Later that year, the company acquired the worldwide publishing rights to Dyer's Kingdom II: Shadoan for DVD-ROM, DVD-Video and CD-ROM.

In 2001, the company acquired the development and worldwide publishing rights to the entire American Laser Games catalog of nine full motion video arcade titles including Mad Dog McCree, Crime Patrol and Who Shot Johnny Rock? These titles have been released on CD-ROM and DVD-Video with Space Pirates and Fast Draw Showdown released in late 2005.

Digital Leisure signed a distribution agreement with Empire Interactive in 2003 to release the "Virtual Music Studio" brand eJay to the North American market. In 2008, Empire Interactive was purchased by Silver Star Holdings and Digital Leisure ceased all distribution of the eJay product line.

In 2007, Digital Leisure in partnership with Bluth Group Ltd, restored and remastered some of its more popular titles to high definition to be played in Blu-ray and HD DVD players.

The company began development on a line of Wii-based titles in the summer of 2008, and released their first title, The Incredible Maze on Nintendo's WiiWare service on October 24, 2008. Digital Leisure followed up this release in November 2008 with Sudoku Challenge!. On March 27, 2009, Digital Leisure released Texas Hold'em Tournament on the WiiWare service.

In 2010, Digital Leisure began creating content for PlayStation Home. Over the course of the next four years they released Dragon's Lair and Space Ace branded content for the platform as well as their own original avatar clothing, private spaces and public gaming spaces including the Western Frontier and Paradise Springs Casino spaces. The Casino became one of Home's most popular spaces, with chip sales in the top 10 items sold for several months running. Due to the success of both this space and Texas Hold'em Tournament on the Wii, Digital Leisure began working on a new standalone social casino game. On February 18, 2015, after the announcement of Home's closure, Digital Leisure released the Early Access version of The Four Kings Casino and Slots on Steam.

== Games ==
=== DVD, Blu-ray and HD DVD ===
- Dragon's Lair
- Dragon's Lair II: Time Warp
- Dragon's Lair III
- Space Ace
- Thayer's Quest (also known as Kingdom: The Far Reaches)
- Time Traveler
- Kingdom II: Shadoan
- Tender Loving Care
- Mad Dog McCree
- Mad Dog II: The Lost Gold
- The Last Bounty Hunter
- Crime Patrol
- Crime Patrol 2: Drug Wars (also known simply as Drug Wars)
- Who Shot Johnny Rock?
- Space Pirates

=== WiiWare ===
- The Incredible Maze
- Sudoku Challenge!
- Texas Hold'em Tournament
- Word Searcher
- Copter Crisis
- Fast Draw Showdown
- 5 in 1 Solitaire
- Chess Challenge!
- Mix Superstar
- Word Searcher Deluxe
- Overflow

=== Wii ===
- Mad Dog McCree Gunslinger Pack
- Dragon's Lair Trilogy

=== Nintendo DSi/DSiWare ===
- Dragon's Lair
- Space Ace
- Dragon's Lair II: Time Warp
- Sudoku Challenge!
- Word Searcher
- Word Searcher 2
- Word Searcher 3
- Word Searcher 4
- Chess Challenge!
- 5 in 1 Solitaire
- 21 Blackjack
- Mega Words
- Match Up!

=== PlayStation Network ===
- Dragon's Lair (PS3 & PSP)
- Space Ace (PS3)
- Dragon's Lair II: Time Warp (PS3)
- Fast Draw Showdown (PS3)
- 5 in 1 Solitaire (PSP)
- The Casino (also known as The Paradise Springs Casino for the PlayStation Home)
- Dragon's Lair items (PlayStation Home)
- Space Ace items (PlayStation Home)
- Get Off My Lawn! (PS Vita)
- Dragon's Lair II: Time Warp items (PlayStation Home)
- The Four Kings Casino and Slots (PS4)
- Mix Superstar (PS3)

=== Mobile devices ===
- Dragon's Lair (iOS & Android) (iOS versions were published by EA)
- Space Ace (iOS & Android)
- Dragon's Lair II: Time Warp (iOS & Android)
- Brain Dead 13 (iOS)
- Mad Dog McCree (iOS)
- Sudoku 100,000,000 (iOS)
- Get Off My Lawn! (iOS & Android)

=== Steam ===
- Get Off My Lawn!
- The Four Kings Casino and Slots

=== Nintendo Switch ===
- Dragon's Lair Trilogy
- The Four Kings Casino and Slots
