= Mad Dog II: The Lost Gold =

1992 video game

- Developers: American Laser Games; Digital Leisure (Wii)
- Publishers: American Laser Games; Philips Media (CD-i); IBM (MS-DOS); Digital Leisure (DVD); Majesco (Wii)
- Platforms: Arcade, 3DO, Sega CD, CD-i, MS-DOS, DVD, Wii, PlayStation Network
- Release: Arcade: NA: 1992; 3DO, Sega CD, CD-i: NA: 1994; EU: 1994; MS-DOS: NA: 1996; DVD: NA: June 12, 2003; Wii: NA: June 16, 2009; EU: August 28, 2009; PlayStation Network: NA: April 16, 2013; EU: May 15, 2013
- Genres: Interactive movie, light gun shooter
- Mode: Single-player

Mad Dog II: The Lost Gold is a live-action LaserDisc video game released by American Laser Games for arcades in 1992. Ports were published for Sega CD, 3DO, and CD-i in 1994, then MS-DOS in 1996. A sequel to the moderately popular Mad Dog McCree, the game adds dynamic shootout scenes and in-game music. Like the first game, the player follows the storyline and is required to quickly shoot certain enemies to proceed on the quest.

The game was re-released by Digital Leisure in 2003 on DVD-Video and again in 2009 on the Wii as part of the Mad Dog McCree Gunslinger Pack, a compilation that also includes the first Mad Dog game as well as The Last Bounty Hunter.

== Plot ==
The anonymous main character must track down the wanted outlaw himself, eliminating any and all gang members and hostiles along the way; from the introduction, one can conclude that he or she will be up against renegade Indians, banditos and "Mad Dog's sleazy crew".

The player proceeds through the game, first by taking a preparatory shooting lesson with a stagecoach driver – played by Ben Zeller, who appeared in the role of the prospector in the original game – and then by choosing one of three guides: "Buckskin" Bonnie, the Professor and Shooting Beaver. Each guide takes the player along a different, unique route, but they converge in the game's final shootouts, which take place inside a moving train and in Mad Dog's hideout; the latter scene is especially lengthy and culminates with a showdown with McCree himself.

However, hunting down and defeating the infamous gunfighter is not the player's only goal; Mad Dog has hidden a chest full of treasure in his hideout and it is up to the player to get it back from him. At times, the player will discover that the treasure chest is full of sand and obviously does not contain the "lost gold". However, this scene does not always occur unless the player has reached the end using more than one credit. The sand scene does not appear on the CD-i or DVD versions of the game.

== Gameplay ==
The player is guided along a path and must shoot the villains before they manage to hit the player character. A special cursor is used to specify the location the player is aiming at. There is also a limited number of bullets in the chamber; however, reloading can be done an infinite number of times.

Like Mad Dog McCree, The Last Bounty Hunter and Fast Draw Showdown, Mad Dog II contains random scenes in which the player takes part in a showdown against one or more gunfighters. The player starts out with an empty chamber and must quickly reload when given the chance, and proceed to eliminate the enemy as fast as possible. Shooting practice at the beginning of the game involves hitting cow skulls, signposts and such from a stagecoach in motion.

The player must avoid getting shot and hitting innocent civilians; if one of these occurs, the player loses one of three lives, and a short clip is displayed often showing an undertaker giving advice or criticizing the player's actions.

== Ports ==
In the CD-i, 3DO, and MS-DOS versions, a mouse or light gun is used to shoot, reload, and choose paths or guides. There is one load/save slot and three difficulty levels.

== Reception ==
Reception

Review scores
Publication	Score
AllGame	3/5 (ARC)
Electronic Gaming Monthly	6.2/10 (3DO)
Next Generation	2/5 (3DO); 2/5 (Sega CD)
CDi	83% (CD-i)
Power Unlimited	85% (CD-i)

The MS-DOS version of Mad Dog II received a 9% from the US version of PC Gamer magazine.

The 3DO version received a 6.2 out of 10 from Electronic Gaming Monthly; their reviewers commented the game was fun but lacked longevity. GamePro gave it a rave review, deeming it "a shot ahead of the original" and "a powerful Western shootout that helps justify the cost of a 3DO." They particularly praised the sharp graphics, the accuracy of the Gamegun peripheral, and the importance of paying attention to the sounds in order to succeed in the game. Next Generation reviewed the 3DO version of the game, rating it two stars out of five, and stated that "American Laser Games claims that Mad Dog II ends with the longest interactive battle ever filmed, but after having played through a tedious half an hour, you'll probably wonder whether or not this is a good thing." Power Unlimited gave the CD-i version a score of 85% summarizing: "An excellent follow-up to the first success. Because you can reach the treasure via three ways and because you have three difficulty levels, it won't get boring quickly. Lightning fast and difficult."

GamePro gave the Sega CD version a more subdued but still positive review, saying it improved upon the graphics and sound quality of the original Mad Dog McCree. They also praised the choice of three different guides, which they said "adds greater depth and replay value to the game." Next Generation reviewed the Sega CD version of the game, rating it two stars out of five, and stated that "this is still the kind of stimulus-response, shooting-gallery action that defines gaming at its most basic level."

== See also ==
- List of LaserDisc games
