= M.A.C.H. 3 =

1983 LaserDisc-based arcade game

- North American flyer
- Developer: Mylstar Electronics
- Publishers: NA: Mylstar Electronics; JP: Taito
- Designer: Chris Brewer
- Programmers: Chris Brewer; Fred Darmstadt; Dave Pfeiffer
- Artists: Jeff Lee; Clay Lacey
- Composers: David Thiel; Craig Beirwaltes
- Platform: Arcade
- Release: NA: October 4, 1983; EU: December 1983; JP: February 1984
- Genre: Shoot 'em up
- Mode: Single-player
- Arcade system: Mylstar Video Disc Graphics System

M.A.C.H. 3 is a shoot 'em up LaserDisc video game developed by Gottlieb and released for US arcades in 1983 under their Mylstar brand. The player controls a high-speed fighter aircraft in one of two missions: either a "Fighter Raid" seen flying forward at low altitude or "Bombing Run" seen in a top-down mode. Video backgrounds from the LaserDisc are overlaid by computer graphics. The title is both a reference to Mach number and is an acronym for "Military Air Command Hunter". It was released in Japan by Taito.

== Development ==
The primary programmers and game designers were Chris Brewer and Fred Darmstadt. The overlaid graphics of the fighter were by Gottlieb's video graphics artist, Jeff Lee. Hardware enabling the graphics overlay on top of the background video was designed by David Pfeiffer. Clay Lacy shot the jet footage.

== Reception ==
In the United States, M.A.C.H. 3 reached number one on RePlay magazine's "Player's Choice" upright arcade cabinet earnings chart in January 1984. On Play Meter's "National Play Meter" polls, it was the top-grossing LaserDisc game in August and October 1984. It was listed by AMOA among the top five highest-grossing arcade games of 1984.

In Japan, Game Machine listed M.A.C.H. 3 as the second most successful upright arcade unit of March 1984.

== See also ==
- Astron Belt (1983)
- Firefox (1984)
- List of LaserDisc games
