= Demolition Man (video game) =

1994 video game

- North American SNES cover artwork featuring Sylvester Stallone as Sergeant John Spartan and Wesley Snipes as Simon Phoenix
- Developer: Alexandria
- Publisher: Acclaim Entertainment
- Designers: Doug Modie; Paul O'Connor; Jeffrey Brown
- Programmers: SNES version Edward Chu; Colin Lewis; Michael Poole; Sega versions Todd Johnson; Earl Stratton; Eric Yiskis
- Composer: Nathan Grigg
- Platforms: Genesis, SNES, Sega CD
- Release: Genesis: NA/EU: September 1995; SNES: NA: September 1995; EU: September 28, 1995; Sega CD: NA: November 15, 1995
- Genres: Action; Platform
- Mode: Single-player

Demolition Man is a pair of action video games based on the film of the same name. Acclaim Entertainment published the 16-bit version, which features run and gun gameplay, for the Super NES, Sega Genesis, and Sega CD. Virgin Interactive released a completely different game for the 3DO that combined several distinct gameplay styles. In both games, the player controls John Spartan, the main character from the film, as he attempts to find and defeat his nemesis, Simon Phoenix.

== SNES, Sega Genesis, and Sega CD ==
The first level is displayed in side view platform type; the health bar is displayed in the bottom left. John Spartan enters the stage by jumping with a cable from a helicopter, a scene taken from the movie.

The 16-bit game is primarily a platform game, with two overhead top-down shooter segments; in either gameplay type the player character can fire in eight directions. Stages are filled with many enemies, mostly gunmen. Enemy characters and the player character can take a number of hits before dying. Power ups can be found around the stages that increase the character's health or ammunition. The game gives the player limited continues and very few lives. The first stage is set in 1996 and all stages after in 2032, following a simplified plot of the movie. In the two overhead view stages the player must find and rescue hostages in order to unlock doors elsewhere in the level.

Weapons include the basic police-issue handgun, a more powerful magnum, a shotgun which fires in a wide spread, and various types of hand grenades. Even though he is the final boss of the game, the player has to fight Simon Phoenix in short-lived "teaser" battles before defeating him for good at the cryo-prison.

The SNES version included cheat codes that are accessed by pausing the game with the start button, and then followed by a sequence of button presses to acquire a particular power up, or skip to the next level.

The Sega CD version was the last release for the console in North America.

=== Reception ===
Reviewing the Genesis version, Scary Larry of GamePro found some problems with the game, in particular the generally "dreary, dark" graphics, but found it overall effective in every respect. He described it as "the kind of game that brings a smile to the faces of 16-bit vets who appreciate a good solid platform/action game." Captain Squideo reviewed the Super NES version for GamePro, and commented that it "parallels the recent Genesis game: it's fast, fun, and explosive." He remarked that though veteran gamers may find the game too simplistic, it is intense and fun overall, and that unlike the Genesis version the graphics are colorful and effectively convey the postapocalyptic settings.

Entertainment Weekly gave the game an A.

Next Generation reviewed the Genesis version of the game, awarding it three stars out of five, and stated that "Ultimately Demolition Man is another Acclaim movie game, and if you own one, there's no need for any of the others."

== 3DO ==
Demolition Man
- Developers: Virgin Interactive Entertainment; Alexandria
- Publisher: Virgin Interactive Entertainment
- Designers: John Alvarado; Ronald Mar; Gary Priest; Stuart Gregg; Barry J. S. Pringle; Douglas W. Cope; Willis Wong
- Composer: Tommy Tallarico
- Platform: 3DO
- Release: JP: December 9, 1994; NA: 1995
- Genre: Action
- Mode: Single-player

The 3DO game was developed in tandem with the film and entails several gameplay styles: of the game's 16 levels, nine are light gun shooter levels, four are one-on-one fighting, two are first-person shooter; and one is a mission-based racing game. Due to the advanced 3DO sound engine, the soundtrack is ripped directly from the movie, and full motion video is heavily used, incorporating both footage from the film and exclusive footage of Sylvester Stallone and Wesley Snipes made specifically for the game. Jesse Ventura reprises his role as a minion to Simon Phoenix as the only actor in the movie to play a cryo-con henchman in the underground level and cryo-prison level. A version of the game was in development by Virgin Interactive and planned to be published by Atari Corporation for the Atari Jaguar CD, but it was cancelled after several delays. A PlayStation version was also in development but never released.

The game uses a password system to save progress, while the 3DO's internal memory is used to save the high score list. There are three difficulty modes.

The light gun shooter levels support the 3DO Gamegun in addition to the standard gamepad. The Gamegun can be daisy-chained to a standard gamepad, which then acts as an extension cord and allows the player to navigate the pause menu and play the non-light gun levels without having to switch out controllers; in fact, Demolition Man will not acknowledge the Gamegun if it is plugged into the controller port on the 3DO itself. The light gun levels are set on a static background on which digitized enemies pop out at random, in a shooting gallery style of gameplay.

The one-on-one fighting levels are similar to Mortal Kombat, in that they feature digitized sprites viewed from a side perspective. In all four levels the player controls John Spartan and plays against Simon Phoenix, but Phoenix's AI is different in each level.

The first-person shooter levels are extremely simple compared to most games in the genre: there are no doors, switches, or health or ammunition pickups, and the player has only one weapon (a pistol) with unlimited ammunition. In lieu of health pickups, John Spartan slowly recovers health over time. The level designs are on a two dimensional square grid and are maze-like, with a great number of branching paths. The player's objective is to reach a specific location within the level.

In the racing level, the player must catch up to Simon Phoenix's car before his own car runs out of fuel, avoiding other cars on the road while picking up fuel refills.

=== Reception ===
GamePro gave the game a positive review. While they criticized the fighting game sections for the delayed attacks and limited number of moves, they overall approved of the variety of gameplay styles and applauded the digitized graphics, high quality audio, and the realism invoked by the game's deep level of detail.

Next Generation rated it two stars out of five, and stated that "if any of the individual stages were crafted very well it might have worked. Unfortunately, that didn't happen."

The game received the 1994 "Movie Translation Game of the Year" Award from Die Hard Game Fan magazine.
