= Badlands (1984 video game) =

1984 LaserDisc video game

- North American arcade flyer
- Developer: Konami
- Publishers: Konami; Centuri
- Platforms: Arcade, MSX
- Release: March 6, 1984
- Genre: Interactive movie
- Modes: Single-player, multiplayer

Badlands (バッドランズ) is a LaserDisc arcade video game developed by Konami and published by both Konami and Centuri. It debuted at the Amusement and Music Operators Association show in October 1983 and was released to the public in early 1984. Badlands follows a cowboy named Buck seeking vengeance on a gang of outlaws and its leader, Landolf, for the murder of his wife and children.

== Gameplay ==
Badlands is an interactive movie set in a wild west fantasy world. The arcade controls consist of a large "shoot" button and a regular "pass" button. Gameplay consists of video scenes, requiring players to shoot and react to environmental hazards and enemies, while passing innocent bystanders. The player starts with 3 lives and losing all lives ends the game. The objective is to eliminate outlaws and claim their bounties.

== Reception ==
In Japan, Game Machine listed Badlands on their September 15, 1984, issue as the second most-successful upright arcade unit of the month.

== See also ==
- List of LaserDisc games
