= Firefox (video game) =

1984 LaserDisc-based arcade game

- Arcade flyer
- Developer: Atari, Inc.
- Publishers: Atari, Inc.
- Designers: Dave Ralston; Mike Hally
- Programmers: Greg Rivera; Norm Avellar
- Artist: Dave Ralston
- Composers: Earl Vickers; Jeff Gusman
- Platform: Arcade
- Release: NA: January 1984; EU: February 1984; JP: 1984
- Genre: Shoot 'em up
- Mode: Single-player
- Arcade system: Atari LaserDisc

Firefox is a 1984 shoot 'em up arcade video game based on the 1982 film of the same name starring Clint Eastwood. It was produced in 1984 as Atari's only LaserDisc video game. (Note: Although Firefox was the only game to be developed by the company, Atari would publish the European versions of the Cinematronics games Dragon's Lair and Space Ace. These versions of the games, which featured major hardware and software differences from their original North American counterparts, were produced independently by the company's European branch in Tipperary, Ireland.) Like Atari's first-person Star Wars and Empire Strikes Back, Firefox came as both an upright and sit down cabinet with a yoke style controller.

== Development ==
Gameplay screenshot

Firefox was primarily designed by Mike Hally and Dave Ralston, and programmed by Greg Rivera and Norm Avellar. The game's development budget was more than $1 million.

The cabinet has stereo sound with an additional headphone port and volume control in the front. All Firefox cabinets shipped with a 19-inch Amplifone raster monitor, and utilized an Atari quad-POKEY. Firefox's power requirements necessitated the use of two Atari AR-II power supplies.

To collect the LaserDisc video, developers Mike Hally and Moe Shore sifted through 20 to 30 hours' worth of footage shot for the film. Most of the resulting footage was first-person shots filmed from helicopters flying over Greenland and Scandinavia.

Firefox shares a cabinet with I, Robot, although significantly fewer I, Robot machines were produced.

== Reception ==
In Japan, Game Machine listed Firefox as the third most successful upright/cockpit arcade unit of March 1984. In the United States, it was the top-grossing LaserDisc game on the Play Meter arcade charts in July 1984.

== See also ==
- Astron Belt
- List of LaserDisc games
- M.A.C.H. 3
