= Crime Patrol (video game) =

1993 video game

- North American arcade flyer
- Developer: American Laser Games: CD-i CapDisc Windows Digital Leisure
- Publishers: American Laser Games: Arcade; NA: American Laser Games; EU: Atari Games; JP: Namco CD-i Philips Media DVD/Windows; NA: Digital Leisure; RU: 1C Company
- Series: Crime Patrol
- Platforms: Arcade, 3DO Interactive Multiplayer DVD, Macintosh, Microsoft Windows, MS-DOS, Philips CD-i, Sega CD
- Release: May 1993: Arcade; NA: May 1993; EU: 1993; JP: October 1993 3DO; NA: 1993 Sega CD; NA: October 1994 Macintosh; NA: 1994 MS-DOS; NA: 1994 CD-i; NA: 1996 DVD; NA: 17 November 2001 Windows; NA: 16 January 2002; RU: 2002
- Genres: Interactive movie, light gun shooter
- Modes: Single-player, multiplayer
- Arcade system: Amiga-based hardware

Crime Patrol is a live-action LaserDisc video game released by American Laser Games in 1993. American Laser Games released a sequel, Crime Patrol 2: Drug Wars later that year.

== Storyline ==
The player character is employed in the police force and works his way up from Rookie to Delta Force, achieved through systematically neutralizing threats which appear in various environments and scenarios. As a Rookie, the player character teams up with a somewhat boisterous policewoman, taking on burglars, armed robbers, and gang members. After getting promoted to Undercover, the player character gets a slightly overweight male partner and confronts drug smugglers and crime lords at a nightclub, a chop shop, and an airfield. Next, in SWAT, the character deals with bank robbers, meth cooks, and outlaw bikers become the enemies. Finally, in Delta Force, the player must stand up to serious threats to national security, such as a hijacked shipment of nuclear material, hijacked planes, and assassination attempts. Each part of the game is made up of three separate scenarios, with one final mission involving a plot to steal plutonium that is filmed partly in night vision.

== Gameplay ==
The CD-i, 3DO, Sega CD, and PC versions use a mouse or light gun to aim and shoot the villains. Reloading is done by moving the light gun outside of the screen and pressing the trigger; this is also achieved when using the mouse by directing the cursor to the bottom right-hand corner of the screen and right-clicking. The player can reload at any time and an infinite number of times. The player has three lives at their disposal. There are four levels, not counting the shooting range, which one can access to improve one's aim and reflexes. Once the player has completed a scene, on the selection screen the icon is closed off, being stamped with the words "CASE CLOSED", but if the player waits too long to choose another scene, a completed case may automatically begin.

== Release ==
A port for the Atari Jaguar CD was reportedly in development but never released. A port for the PlayStation and Sega Saturn was also slated for Christmas 1996, but was cancelled at the last minute.

== Reception ==
Play Meter listed Crime Patrol as the ninth most popular arcade game of July 1993.

GamePro panned the Sega CD version, citing poor acting, corny dialogue, excessively grainy graphics, inaccurate controls when using a standard gamepad instead of a light gun, and generic light gun shooter gameplay. The same GamePro reviewer leveled all the same criticisms at the 3DO version except for the graphics, remarking that the 3DO version has "clean, sharp, digitized images". A reviewer for Next Generation gave the 3DO version two out of five stars, criticizing the poor acting and overt similarity to previous American Laser Games offerings. Though he admitted that the game is decently fun with a 3DO light gun, and that the video contains several entertaining stunts, he concluded, "Personally, we'd rather rent Commando again."

Maximum dubbed the PC version "one of the best arcade conversions, ever" but derided the shallow and lowbrow nature of the game itself. They described the line of American Laser Games light gun games as "lineal descendants of fairground shooting galleries. Substitute the moving ducks and gats for an episode of Starsky & Hutch and a plastic pistol ... and you have grasped the essence of the thing." However, they acknowledged that this style of game has its appeal and concluded, "No intellectual challenges here, folks, but for the right kind of homo-couchpotatus, Crime Patrol is a satisfying piece of idle machismo." They gave it three out of five stars.

== See also ==
- List of gun games
- List of LaserDisc games
