= The Last Bounty Hunter =

1994 video game

- Developers: American Laser Games; Digital Leisure (Wii)
- Publishers: American Laser Games; Philips Media (CD-i); Digital Leisure (DVD); Majesco (Wii)
- Platforms: Arcade, MS-DOS, 3DO, CD-i, DVD, Wii
- Release: Arcade, MS-DOS: NA: 1994; 3DO: NA: November 1995; CD-i: EU: 1996; DVD: NA: June 12, 2003; Wii: NA: June 16, 2009; EU: August 28, 2009
- Genres: Interactive movie, light gun shooter
- Mode: Single-player

The Last Bounty Hunter is a live-action LaserDisc video game released by American Laser Games in 1994. Like almost all of the games produced by the now-defunct company, it is a rail shooter and, like the two installments in the Mad Dog McCree series before it, is set in the Old West. However, it takes a more comedic approach than the Mad Dog McCree games in both its story sequences and the characters' comically exaggerated reactions to being shot. Filmed at Old Tucson Studios in Tucson, Arizona, it was one of the company's last releases before it was forced to close down. It was re-released by Digital Leisure in 2002 and was eventually packaged with Fast Draw Showdown by Global VR as an arcade cabinet under the name Six Gun Select.

Originally, home versions of the game were released for MS-DOS, 3DO, and CD-i. It has since been bundled with both Mad Dog McCree and Mad Dog II: The Lost Gold as part of 2009's Mad Dog McCree Gunslinger Pack, a compilation for the Wii.

== Plot ==
The player steps into the shoes of an anonymous bounty hunter who rides into a busy town in order to track down and bring to justice four outlaws whose control over the territory is widespread: Handsome Harry, Nasty Dan, El Loco, and The Cactus Kid.

The bounty hunter first fights against a group of bandits attacking a fort commanded by a United States Army general, Clinton Briggs. With each scenario, the bounty hunter fights his way to the final enemy, one of the four outlaws, each of whom can either be wounded and apprehended or shot dead. The ending sequence depends on the way in which the criminals were brought to justice.

== Gameplay ==
The player receives an amount of money for each neutralized outlaw; this money translates into points. Throughout the game, three different weapons can be used: the standard six-shooter, the seemingly more powerful shotgun, and a gun that holds more bullets than the normal six-shooter, which can be found as a bonus at times by shooting oxen skulls, hanging lanterns, and wooden wheels. Showdowns take place at random, though more frequently and with greater diversity than in Mad Dog McCree; one of the gunfighters is Wes Flowers, the star of another American Laser Games release, Fast Draw Showdown.

As in related games, the 3DO and CD-i versions are compatible with both mouse and light gun as well as the console's standard control pad. Getting hit or firing upon a civilian results in the loss of one of three lives and an appropriate sequence involving a gravedigger. There is one load/save slot and a second player can be introduced at the start of the game.

The point, or "cash", bonus for completing a stage is higher if the boss is taken alive, by means of shooting the gun out of his hand before he can fire. Depending on who was captured alive, spared bosses may come back and try to either bribe or shoot the player character. Once in a while, the action will take a break to a setting which involves a duel with one enemy or a group of men standing in which only one actually takes part in the duel. The player must shoot only after the shooter goes for his gun and not shoot any of the other men.

== Reception ==
RePlay reported The Last Bounty Hunter to be the eight most-popular deluxe arcade game at the time. Play Meter also listed the title to be the thirty-fourth most-popular arcade game at the time.

Reviewing the DOS version, a Next Generation critic criticized that the gameplay is boringly simplistic. He concluded, "As full-motion video shooting games go, this is the best of the bunch, but that's not saying much.", and scored it two out of five stars. The magazine's review of the 3DO version focused on how the game was overly similar to previous American Laser Games releases, particularly in that it is impossible to respond in time to certain enemies without the foresight of having been shot by them before, and that the cursor moves too slowly for the game to be playable without a light gun. The reviewer scored it two out of five stars.

Entertainment Weekly gave the game a C− and wrote that people might take offense at the African-American grave digger character.

== See also ==
- List of LaserDisc games
