= Mad Dog McCree =

1990 Western-themed arcade video game

- North American arcade flyer
- Developer: American Laser Games: CapDisc (CD-i) Digital Leisure (iOS/Windows/Wii) Engine Software (3DS)
- Publishers: American Laser Games: Arcade; NA: American Laser Games; EU: Atari Games; JP: Capcom Philips Media (CD-i) Digital Leisure (3DS/DVD/iOS/Windows) Majesco (Wii)
- Director: David Roberts
- Designer: James Pattinson
- Programmer: Pierre Maloka
- Series: Mad Dog
- Platform: Arcade: 3DO Interactive Multiplayer, DVD, iOS, Microsoft Windows, Nintendo 3DS, Philips CD-i, PlayStation Network, Sega CD, Wii
- Release: December 1990: Arcade; NA: December 1990; EU: February 1991; JP: January 1992 MS-DOS; NA: 1992 Sega CD; NA: 1993 Windows; NA: April 22, 1993 CD-i; NA: 1994; EU: 1994 3DO; NA: 1994; EU: 1994 DVD; NA: November 13, 2001 Wii; NA: June 16, 2009; EU: August 28, 2009 iOS; NA: December 20, 2011 Nintendo 3DS; NA: June 14, 2012; EU: October 18, 2012 PlayStation Network; NA: January 22, 2013; EU: January 23, 2013
- Genres: Interactive movie, light gun shooter
- Mode: Single-player

Mad Dog McCree is the first live-action LaserDisc video game released by American Laser Games. It originally appeared as an arcade video game with Amiga-based hardware in 1990.

The game gained considerable attention for its live-action video style, bearing similarities to contemporary Hollywood Western films. Its success inspired a series of similar live-action rail shooter games in the following years.

== Gameplay ==
In a series of stages, the player must shoot enemies before they fire, avoid shooting innocent bystanders, and reload each time their six-round revolver is depleted of bullets. Shooting a bystander or getting hit by a gunfighter results in the loss of one life out of three and is followed by a clip showing the town doctor commenting on the player's actions.

However, this traditional light gun shooter gameplay is interspersed with "showdowns", which are fast draw duels that play the same as American Laser Games's later release Fast Draw Showdown. The arcade version is equipped with a specialized light gun which can detect whether or not the player had properly lowered the light gun at the beginning of the duel. Home versions of the game attempted to simulate this mechanic by having the player's gun unloaded at the beginning of the duel, and not allowing it to be reloaded until the same moment when the arcade version would allow the player to draw.

The home versions allow the player to choose from three difficulty modes.

== Storyline ==
The player assumes the first-person role of the game's silent protagonist, a nameless individual addressed only as "stranger". The stranger rides into an unnamed Old West town and is approached by an elderly prospector (Ben Zeller), who appeals to him for help. He tells the stranger that the mayor and his daughter have been kidnapped by a gang of outlaws led by the notorious "Mad Dog" McCree (Rusty Dillon), and when the sheriff tried to stop them, they locked him up in the jail. Two of the gang appear to silence the prospector, but the stranger shoots them. The prospector then tells him that "One-Eyed" Jack holds the keys to the jail, and is in the saloon. For the remainder of the game, the exact order of events depends on the player's decisions.

The stranger enters the saloon, where One-Eyed Jack and his cohorts are making trouble. The stranger defeats them and takes the jail keys. He visits the jail and frees the sheriff. The stranger and sheriff set out to stop Mad Dog, but are ambushed by three of his gang outside the jail. They defeat them, but the sheriff is fatally shot. With his dying breaths, he tells the stranger that the map to Mad Dog's hideout is hidden in the local mine, and that he should consult the prospector before going there.

The stranger sees that the bank is being robbed by Mad Dog's men. After he stops the robbery, a thankful boy advises him not to enter Mad Dog's hideout from the back entrance (sometimes, he will advise not to take the front entrance). He finds the prospector has been tied up to a pile of live explosives by Mad Dog himself, and saves him by severing the fuse.

After finding the map in the mine, the stranger follows the path to the hideout. He shoots out the smokestack, forcing Mad Dog's gang out as the hideout floods with smoke. He shoots them down as they come out and saves the mayor. However, McCree himself has escaped with the mayor's daughter, leaving behind a taunting note for the stranger.

The stranger confronts Mad Dog in a final quick-draw showdown. Forewarned that Mad Dog wears a bulletproof vest, the stranger defeats him by shooting both his hands. The mayor then unties his daughter. Unfortunately, as the townsfolk congratulate the stranger, Mad Dog recovers, and is seen riding a horse off into the distance.

== Development ==
Mad Dog McCree was the first title released by American Laser Games, a company which was born out of the founders' previous venture of producing police training simulators. The game had a development budget of $125,000. American Laser Games filmed all the footage for the game in its home state, New Mexico, and used local actors to fill all the roles. Local rancher Russ Dillen played various outlaws in the game including the titular Mad Dog, for which he had to dye his natural blonde hair black. His wife Lori played the saloon barfly. Ben Zeller, who plays the prospector, went on to have major roles in two further American Laser Games productions, Mad Dog II: The Lost Gold and Space Pirates. Carol Eason, who plays the undertaker, also reprised his role in Mad Dog II: The Lost Gold.

== Release ==
The arcade edition of the game has been released with four different hardware setups, using a LaserDisc player as well as a Commodore Amiga 500 motherboard with special interfaces for controls and booting, and a genlock. Home versions were released for the Sega CD, CD-i, 3DO, and Microsoft Windows. A port for the Atari Jaguar CD was announced in 1994 and reportedly in development but it was never released. Mad Dog McCree was the first in a series of American Laser Games releases to be reissued by Digital Leisure with updated video and sound quality in 2001 for DVD, playable with a standard DVD remote.

In 2009, the game was released for the Nintendo Wii as part of the Mad Dog McCree: Gunslinger Pack. Included in this collection are its sequel Mad Dog II: The Lost Gold and The Last Bounty Hunter. In 2011, it was released for iOS. On June 14, 2012, it was released on the Nintendo eShop for the Nintendo 3DS. Sony revealed on January 21, 2013, that the game would be released for PlayStation 3 the following day. The PlayStation 3 version features remastered video presented in 720p and a new interface.

== Sequel ==
A sequel was released entitled Mad Dog II: The Lost Gold.

== Reception ==
Reception

Aggregate scores
| Aggregator | Score |
|---|---|
| GameRankings | 32% (PC); 55% (3DO); 34.5% (DVD); 35.83% (Wii); 27.2% (3DS); 60% (PS3) |
| Metacritic | 31/100 (Wii); 41/100 (iOS); 27/100 (3DS) |

Review scores
| Publication | Score |
|---|---|
| AllGame | 1/5 (DOS); 2/5 (MAC) |
| Edge | 3/10 (3DO) |
| GameFan | 209/400 (3DO) (Note: GamePro's review of the 3DO version was by four reviewers that each scored it 59%, 36%, 54% and 60%.) |
| GamePro | 12.5/20 (3DO) (Note: GamePro gave the 3DO version two 4/5 scores for graphics and sound, a 2/5 for control and a 2.5/5 for fun factor.) |
| Hyper | 75/100 (DOS) |
| PC Games (DE) | 75% (DOS) |
| Sinclair User | 85% (ARC) |
| VideoGames & Computer Entertainment | 6/10 (3DO); 8/10 (DOS) |
| CD-i Magazine | 87% (CD-i) |
| Electronic Games | 92% (DOS) |
| Mega | 59% (Sega CD) |
| MegaTech | 61% (Sega CD) |
| Mega Power | 58% (Sega CD) |

In North America, over 100 arcade cabinets were sold by February 1991, and it was the top-grossing new video game on the RePlay arcade charts from February to April 1991. In Japan, Game Machine listed Mad Dog McCree as the third most successful upright/cockpit arcade unit of August 1992.

The original arcade game was praised by GamePro for its amusing cowboy stereotypes.

Reviews of the 3DO panned long delays between shots and outcome video that affected gameplay experience, and having to use the gamepad as a control for the gun cursor, especially when the 3DO Gamegun was yet to be released. An Edge review noted collision detections, and comments on the console's video quality by reviews ranged from "tolerable" to poor.

Reviewing the Sega CD version, GamePro noted that the video was so grainy that the manual diagramed one of the levels because the important items in it were indiscernible. GamePro nonetheless assessed it as the best home version of the game to date, due to the ability to play it with a light gun. The magazine was much more approving of the later CD-i version due to the high quality live action video and the bundled Peacekeeper Revolver, commenting that "This slick-looking revolver handles well and sports a hair trigger that'll make a Dirty Harry out of anyone." In April 1994 Computer Gaming World said that the DOS version "brings exciting action to PC compatibles ... there's plenty for the sheriff to do".

== See also ==
- List of LaserDisc games
