= Fast Draw Showdown =

1994 video game

- Arcade flyer
- Developers: American Laser Games; Digital Leisure (Wii, PS3)
- Publishers: American Laser Games; Digital Leisure (Wii, PS3)
- Platforms: Arcade, Wii (WiiWare), PlayStation 3 (PlayStation Network)
- Release: Arcade: WW: 1994; PC: Canada: 2004; Russia: 2005; Wii: NA: January 4, 2010; EU: January 22, 2010; PS3: WW: July 19, 2011
- Genres: Interactive movie, light gun shooter
- Mode: Single-player

Fast Draw Showdown is a live-action LaserDisc video game released by American Laser Games in 1994 for a limited number of platforms. As one of the last live-action rail shooters released by the company, which began the series with Mad Dog McCree, it is also arguably the shortest. The game was filmed entirely in at the Old Tucson Studios near Tucson, Arizona, with sets used for several notable films belonging to the Western genre.

Global VR re-released the arcade game in 2002. It was also re-released for PC only by Digital Leisure in 2004 with mouse and light gun support. It was also re-released for WiiWare in North America on January 4, 2010 and in the PAL region on January 22, 2010. A HD port of the game was released for the PlayStation Network on the PlayStation 3 on July 19, 2011 and supports the PlayStation Move controller. A 3DO Interactive Multiplayer version was announced but never released.

== Plot ==
The player, as is the standard in American Laser Games releases, assumes the role of an anonymous individual who takes part in a series of showdowns with several different gunfighters. It is suggested that the protagonist is a lawman. This is confirmed by the three available difficulty levels: deputy, sheriff and marshal. The Old West setting is the scene of up to five showdowns, during which the player must draw his revolver as quickly as possible and shoot the enemies before they manage to shoot the player.

The aim of the game is to defeat all the foes the player is up against; if this is achieved flawlessly, the lawman takes part in a final showdown in which he faces Wes Flowers, "one of the world's fastest quick-drawers", who is not a fictional character, but a real-life Fast Draw champion. If Flowers is also defeated, the player receives the title of Best Deputy, Super Sheriff or Master Marshal, depending on the difficulty level.

== Gameplay ==
In each of the gunfights, the player must attempt to out-draw the villains, first by holstering the available light gun and proceeding to wait until a signal is given that lets him know he must draw, aim and fire at the enemy or enemies, as quickly as possible. A foul occurs if one draws the gun too soon, with a maximum of three allowed, and a chance to face Wes Flowers is only given if all four of the previous gunfights are victorious for the player.

At times, the player faces two opponents instead of one, but, invariably, only one will draw his or her gun and thus pose a threat. The game ends successfully when the player has defeated all of the villains, including Wes Flowers.

== Reception ==
Play Meter listed Fast Draw Showdown as the 26th most popular arcade game of October 1994.

== See also ==
- List of LaserDisc games
