= American Laser Games =

American videogame company

- Type: Private
- Industry: Video games
- Fate: Bought out by HeR Interactive
- Headquarters: Albuquerque, New Mexico
- Key people: Robert Grebe (Founder)
- Products: Mad Dog McCree series; Crime Patrol series

American Laser Games was a company based in Albuquerque, New Mexico that created numerous light gun LaserDisc video games featuring live-action full motion video. Almost all arcade games released by the company were light gun shooters and a number of them also had an Old West theme.

American Laser arcade cabinets included a Sony Lasermax LaserDisc player to stream the video content, and an Amiga 500 computer to overlay on-screen graphics, and to control individual game logic. The computer was fitted with a bespoke interface to utilise the LaserDisc player, an auto-booting ROM board, and a Roctec Genlock.

Later, the company turned toward compact disc technology to release its games. Ports of its arcade titles were released for the Sega CD, CD-i and DOS computers equipped with CD-ROM drives. The company was particularly supportive of the 3DO, not only releasing versions of its games for the console, but also offering a modified version of the 3DO platform as an upgrade kit for existing arcade video game cabinets, supporting compressed video versions of their games at a lower cost. In 1995, American Laser Games released Mazer for the 3DO home market and Orbatak (3DO-powered) for the arcade - their first and only in-house non-Full motion video based games. The company also released a series of light-gun controllers, including the 3DO Game Gun and the PC Gamegun, for home computer use. The latter proved unsuccessful due to its poor accuracy.

== History ==
The company was founded in the late 1980s by Robert Grebe, who had originally created a system to train police officers under the company name ICAT (Institute for Combat Arms and Tactics) and later adapted the technology for arcade games. Its first hit game was Mad Dog McCree, a light gun shooter set in the American Old West. By mid-1995, they were recognized as the leading company in the medium of laserdisc-based arcade games.

American Laser Games lasted until the mid-to-late 1990s, by which time it had begun making "games for girls" for the PC under the moniker HeR Interactive, beginning with McKenzie & Co. In response to a major slump in the arcade industry, American Laser Games ended its direct manufacturing of coin-op machines in November 1995, and turned its focus to developing games for the Sega Saturn and Sony PlayStation. This failed to revive the company's fortunes, and revenues in 1996 were roughly half of the $16 million it generated in 1995.

At the end of 1996, ALG laid off a third of its staff, Jan Claesson replaced Grebe as president, and the company began focusing primarily on the HeR Interactive line, cancelling all the games in their mainstream line except for Shining Sword. The company eventually closed its doors and was bought out by HeR Interactive, which had been spun off before ALG closing and is still making games as of 2024. In 2000, the development and publishing rights to all of the games that were produced by American Laser Games were purchased by Digital Leisure, Inc from HeR Interactive. Many of these games were then re-released for the PC and in DVD TV game format.

== Games ==
=== Light gun arcade games ===
- Mad Dog McCree (1990)
- Who Shot Johnny Rock? (1991)
- Space Pirates (1992)
- Mad Dog II: The Lost Gold (1992)
- Gallagher's Gallery (1992) (Note: Referred to as Shooting Gallery in promotional material, and as Gallagher on cabinet artwork.)
- Crime Patrol (1993)
- Crime Patrol 2: Drug Wars (1993)
- The Last Bounty Hunter (1994)
- Fast Draw Showdown (1994)
- Shootout at Old Tucson (1994, limited arcade release. 3DO port was cancelled)

=== Other arcade games ===
- Mazer
- Orbatak

=== Console and computer games ===
- Way of the Warrior (with Naughty Dog)
- McKenzie & Co.
- McKenzie & Co. : More Friends
- The Vampire Diaries
- Battles in Time (with QQP)
- Shining Sword (cancelled)
- Blood Bath at Red Falls (1995)

== See also ==
- Digital Pictures
