= The Three Stooges (1984 video game) =

1984 video game

- Arcade flyer
- Developer: Mylstar Electronics
- Publisher: Mylstar Electronics
- Designers: Tom Malinowski
- Programmer: Sam Russo
- Artist: Jeff Lee
- Composer: Dave Zabriskie
- Platform: Arcade
- Release: 1984
- Genre: Action
- Mode: Multiplayer

The Three Stooges, shown as The Three Stooges in Brides is Brides on the title screen, is a 1984 arcade game by Mylstar Electronics. It is based on the comedy act of the same name.

== Gameplay ==
The game features digital voice samples. At the start of the game, up to three players control Moe Howard, Larry Fine and Curly Howard. Players must help the Three Stooges find their fiancees, Cora, Nora and Dora, who were kidnapped by the Mad Scientist. In all rooms, players must find three hidden keys that unlock the exit. Interfering socialites and cops are dealt with in typical Stooges style: face slaps, hammer hits, and the ever-dependable cream pie throws. In the bonus rounds, players must avoid the opera singer's sour notes, as well as cops, while collecting the three keys to the exit. In the Mad Scientist's laboratory, the players will be able to save only one fiancée, before players must find the other two fiancees. After all fiancees are saved, the game starts over.
