= 3DO =

Video gaming format

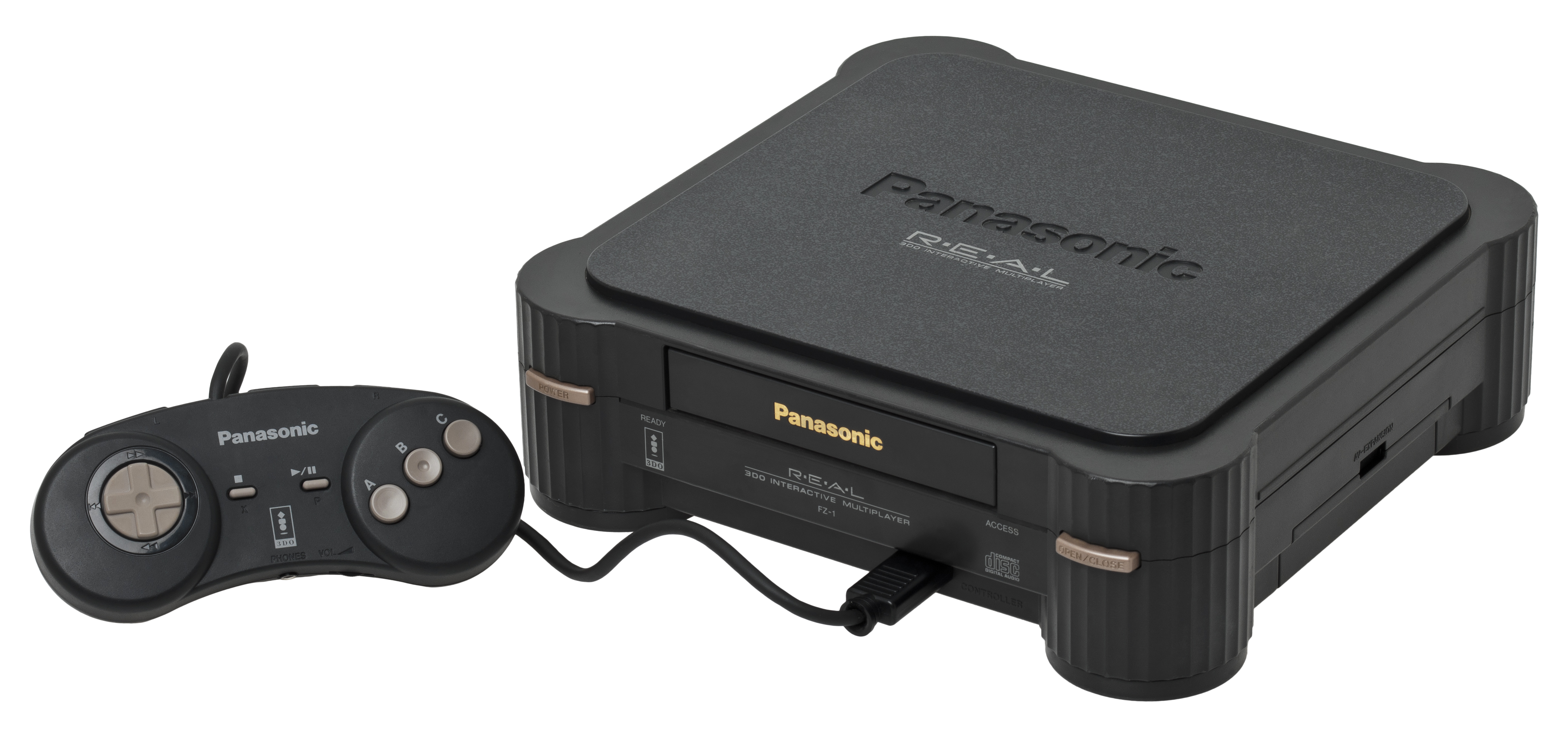
- The first 3DO machine, Panasonic FZ-1 R.E.A.L. 3DO Interactive Multiplayer
- Developer: The 3DO Company
- Manufacturer: Panasonic, Sanyo, GoldStar, Creative Technology
- Type: Home video game console
- Generation: Fifth
- Released: NA: October 4, 1993; JP: March 20, 1994; EU: June 10, 1994; KOR: December 3, 1994
- Introductory price: US$699.99 (equivalent to $1,586.45 in March 2026); JP¥79,800; KOR₩399,000
- Discontinued: 1996
- Units sold: 2 million units
- Media: CD-ROM
- CPU: 32-bit custom RISC CPU (ARM60) @ 12.5 MHz
- Memory: 2 MB RAM, 1 MB VRAM
- Storage: 32 KB SRAM
- Display: 320×240 @ 60 Hz, 384×288 @ 50 Hz; 16-bit palettized color (from 24-bit) or 24-bit true color.
- Graphics: Panasonic FZ-1 "Madam" graphics accelerator
- Sound: Panasonic FZ-1 "Clio" DSP: 16-bit stereo @ 44.1 kHz, 4-Channel Dolby Surround;
- Online services: Planned but canceled
- Best-selling game: Gex (1+ million) (Note: Sales figures for Gex remain unclear. Although the October and November 1995 issues of GamePro and Electronic Gaming Monthly both state that Gex exceeded 1 million in sales in July 1995 (well before the game was released for any platform other than the 3DO), an article in Next Generation also cover-dated November 1995 says that the 3DO Interactive Multiplayer had sold only 750,000 units worldwide.)
- Successor: Panasonic M2 (canceled)

3DO is a video gaming hardware format developed by The 3DO Company and conceived by Electronic Arts founder Trip Hawkins. The specifications were originally designed by Dave Needle and RJ Mical of New Technology Group, and were licensed by third parties; most hardware were packaged as home video game consoles under the name Interactive Multiplayer, and Panasonic produced the first models in 1993 with further renditions released afterwards by manufacturers GoldStar, Sanyo, Creative Labs, and Samsung Electronics.

Centered around a 32-bit ARM60 processor and a custom graphics chip, the format was initially marketed as a multimedia one but this shifted into purely video games within a year of launching. Despite having a highly promoted launch (including being named Time magazine's "1993 Product of the Year"), the high price relative to other game consoles, an oversaturated console market, and the system's mixed reviews prevented it from achieving success comparable to competing consoles from Sega and Sony, leading to its discontinuation by 1996. In 1997, The 3DO Company sold its "Opera" hardware to Samsung, a year after offloading its M2 successor hardware to Panasonic.

== History ==
=== Conception ===
The 3DO format was the brainchild of Electronic Arts (EA) founder Trip Hawkins; while at EA, he found himself frustrated with the limitations of developing software for different platforms that were incompatible with each other. Hawkins was inspired to create his own platform from his repeated recollection of a cartoon he saw on a wall at his previous employer, Apple Computer: it consisted of two vultures on a branch, with one suggesting to the other that they kill something instead of waiting to scavenge. Hawkins formed a unit within EA to work on the platform, but when it was spun off as The 3DO Company on September 12, 1991, he found no one willing to oversee it; he ultimately relinquished his role as chief executive of EA to oversee it himself while remaining at EA as its chairman. The 3DO name itself was an abbreviation of "three-dimensional optics", though it was also a play on the words "audio" and "video". The 3DO Company's objective was to create a next-generation, CD-based video game and entertainment standard that would be manufactured by various partners and licensees; 3DO would collect a royalty on each console sold and on each game manufactured. To game publishers, the low US$3 royalty rate per game was a better deal than the higher royalties paid to Nintendo and Sega when making games for their consoles. The 3DO hardware itself was designed by Dave Needle and RJ Mical (designers of the Atari Lynx), starting from an outline on a restaurant napkin in 1989. Trip Hawkins was a long-time acquaintance of Needle and Mical and found that their design very closely fit his philosophy for architecture and approach, so he decided: "Rather than me start a brand-new team and starting from scratch, it just made a lot of sense to ... join forces with them and shape what they were doing into what I wanted it to be." The company demonstrated a prototype unit at the Winter Consumer Electronics Show in January 1993, where attendees marveled at the console's graphical capabilities; industry analysts considered them unprecedented compared to those of contemporary consoles and personal computers.

=== Licensing model ===
The 3DO Company lacked the resources to manufacture consoles, and instead licensed the hardware to other companies for manufacturing. Trip Hawkins recounted that they approached every electronics manufacturer, but that their chief targets were Sony and Matsushita (now named Panasonic), the two largest consumer electronics companies in the world. Nonetheless, Sony had already begun development on their own console, the PlayStation, and ultimately decided to continue work on it rather than sign with 3DO. According to former Sega CEO Tom Kalinske, The 3DO Company was engaged in very serious talks for Sega to become involved with the 3DO, though Sega ultimately passed on it due to concerns over cost. In contrast, Matsushita agreed to partner with the company as it was seeking reassurance for its investment in MCA Inc., which owned Universal Pictures and had yet to see substantial success since its acquisition by Matsushita in 1990. Matsushita launched the 3DO with its Panasonic FZ-1 model in 1993, though Goldstar (now LG) and Sanyo would later manufacture the 3DO as well. Companies who obtained the hardware license but never actually sold 3DO units include Samsung, Toshiba, and AT&T, who went so far as to build prototype AT&T 3DO units and display them at the January 1994 Consumer Electronics Show.

Licensing to independent manufacturers made the system extremely expensive. The manufacturers had to make a profit on the hardware itself, whereas most major game console manufacturers, such as Sega and Sony, sold their systems at a loss, with expectations of making up for the loss with software sales. The 3DO was priced at US$699, far above competing game systems and aimed at high-end users and early adopters. Goldstar, Sanyo, and Panasonic's later models were less expensive to manufacture than the FZ-1 and were sold for considerably lower prices. For example, the Goldstar model launched at $399. In addition, after six months on the market, the price of the FZ-1 had dropped to $499.

=== Competition ===
Hawkins' belief was that the 3DO system could become a dominant standard in a similar way to that achieved by the VHS video cassette format, with several companies being able to promote the standard effectively against individual competitors with their own technologies. It was also believed that companies would be able to more effectively compete by being able to leverage a common standard, as opposed to having to attract developers to individual formats, with Hawkins noting that this would be "tough for Atari and Sony". Indeed, Hawkins believed that the failure of NEC to establish its TurboGrafx system, and yet being "much bigger than Sony", illustrated the difficulties faced by new entrants to the console market and thought that Sony, in following the business model of Sega and Nintendo, "would have had a better chance if it had partnered with some of the others". Meanwhile, other products were not regarded as competitive threats: the Atari Jaguar was perceived as "primitive" and "slightly better than a 16-bit system", and the Philips CD-i was regarded as "really obsolete by today's standards". Both 3DO and Philips, seeking to pioneer the broader concept of interactive entertainment, aimed to sell in the order of one million units during 1994 and into 1995.

Hawkins claimed that the console was HDTV-capable, and that the company could use its technology for a set-top box. It was believed the platform would appeal to cable companies seeking to provide digital interactive services, with broadcasts being accompanied by digital information, eventually leading to the development of video-on-demand services on what was described as a "client-server interactive network", with an interactive networking trial having been announced in collaboration with US West in Omaha, Nebraska for the autumn of 1994.

=== Launch and performance ===
The launch of the platform in October 1993 received a great deal of attention in the press as part of the "multimedia wave" in the computer world at the time. Return Fire, Road Rash, FIFA International Soccer, and Jurassic Park Interactive had been slated for launch releases but were pushed to mid-1994 due to the developers' struggles with the then-cutting-edge hardware. Moreover, the 3DO Company made continuous updates to the console hardware almost up to the system's release, which resulted in a number of third-party titles missing the launch date, in some cases by less than a month, because the developers were not left enough time to fully test them on the finalized hardware. The only 3DO software available at launch was the third-party game Crash 'N Burn. Panasonic also failed to manufacture an ample supply of the console in time for launch day, and as a result most retail stores only received one or two units. By mid-November, the 3DO had sold 30,000 units.

The system was released in Japan in March 1994 with an initial lineup of six games. The Japanese launch was moderately successful, with 70,000 units shipping to 10,000 stores. Sales soon dropped and by 1995 the system was known in Japan as a host for pornographic releases.

Computer Gaming World reported in January 1994 that 3DO "is poised for an avalanche of software support to appear in the next 12 months", unlike the Atari Jaguar and Pioneer LaserActive. The magazine predicted that "If 3DO's licensees can get enough machines and software out in the market, this could very well become the interactive gamer's entry level machine" and possibly "the ideal plug-and-play solution for those of us who are tired of playing circuit board roulette with our personal computers". Electronic Arts promoted the console in two-page advertisements, describing it as a "technological leap" and promising "twenty new titles ... over the next twelve months".

The 3DO's claim to the title of most advanced console on the market was lost with the 1994 Japanese launches of the Sony PlayStation and Sega Saturn. The 3DO Company responded by emphasizing their console's large existing software library, lower price (both the Panasonic and Goldstar models were $299 by this time), and promised successor: the M2. To assure consumers that the 3DO would still be supported, the M2 was initially announced as an add-on for the 3DO. It was later revealed that the M2 would be an entirely separate console, albeit one with 3DO backward compatibility. Eventually the M2 project was cancelled.

=== End of 3DO ===
Unlike Panasonic, Goldstar initially produced only 3DO hardware, not software. This made it difficult to manage competitive price drops, and when the price of the Goldstar 3DO dropped to $199 in December 1995, the company took a loss of more than $100 on each sale. Goldstar tried switching to the usual industry model of selling hardware at a loss and profiting on software, but though a handful of Goldstar games were published for the 3DO, Goldstar's software development operation arrived too late to allow them to turn a profit on the 3DO. This lack of a profitable business model, combined with Panasonic acquiring exclusive rights to the M2 technology, were cited as the two chief reasons for Goldstar dropping support for the 3DO in early 1996. During the second quarter of 1996 several of the 3DO's most loyal software supporters, including the software division of The 3DO Company themselves, announced they were no longer making games for the system, leaving Panasonic as the only company supporting active software development for the 3DO.

The 3DO system was eventually discontinued towards the end of 1996, with a complete shutdown of all internal hardware development and divestment of the M2 technology to Panasonic. The 3DO Company restructured themselves around this same time, selling off their hardware division to become a multi-platform company focused on software development and online gaming. After The 3DO Company sold its "Opera" hardware to Samsung in 1997, the 3DO platform had achieved more attention in South Korea, where LG had opened a '3DO Plaza' in Seoul on its 1994 launch and many games had been localized. It competed there against Samsung's local version of the Sega Genesis and Hyundai's "Comboy" Super Nintendo.

The initial high price is considered to be one of the many issues that led to the 3DO's failure, along with lack of significant funding that larger companies such as Sony took advantage of. In an interview shortly after The 3DO Company dropped support for the system, Trip Hawkins attributed its failure to the model of licensing all hardware manufacturing and software to third parties. He reasoned that for a console to be a success, it needed a single strong company to take the lead in marketing, hardware, and software, and pointed out that it was essentially a lack of coordination between The 3DO Company, Panasonic, and the 3DO's software developers that had led to the console launching with only one game ready.

== Licensed systems ==
Panasonic FZ-1 R·E·A·L 3DO Interactive Multiplayer	Panasonic FZ-10 R·E·A·L 3DO Interactive Multiplayer
Panasonic FZ-1	Panasonic FZ-10
GoldStar (LG) 3DO Interactive Multiplayer	The Sanyo 3DO TRY
GoldStar GDO-101M	Sanyo IMP-21J TRY

A number of different manufacturers produced the 3DO system. The Panasonic versions are the best known and most common.

- Panasonic FZ-1 R·E·A·L 3DO Interactive Multiplayer (Japan, Asia, North America and Europe) – The first 3DO system, which was initially priced at US$699.99 (equivalent to $1,521 in 2025) in the U.S. and ¥79,800 (1994) (equivalent to ¥90,209 or US$596 in 2024) in Japan. The price was reduced to US$399.99 (equivalent to $869 in 2025) in the fall of 1994.
- Panasonic FZ-10 R·E·A·L 3DO Interactive Multiplayer (Japan, North America and Europe) – Released on November 11, 1994 (a year after the FZ-1), it is a redesigned slimmer and lighter model that replaced the FZ-1 in Panasonic's portfolio. The FZ-10 featured a top loading CD tray and an internal memory manager. The controller is also smaller and lighter than the one included with the FZ-1 as it lacks a headphones connector.
- Panasonic N-1005 3DO CD Changer "ROBO" (Japan only) – An FZ-1 custom console, fitted with a five-disc CD drive.
- GoldStar GDO-101 Alive 3DO Interactive Multiplayer (South Korea) – Released in mid-1994, this model is similar in physical appearance to the Panasonic model.
- GoldStar GDO-101M 3DO Interactive Multiplayer (North America and Europe) – A version of the GDO-101 for foreign markets.
- GoldStar GDO-202 3DO Interactive Multiplayer (Korea and Europe) – An updated version of the GDO-101. CD-ROM drive replaced with one similar to that of the FZ-1 style.
- GoldStar GDO-203 3DO Alive II (South Korea only) – Replaced the GDO-202 in late 1995, but was discontinued shortly thereafter. Had a centered, top-loading CD tray.
- Sanyo IMP-21J TRY 3DO Interactive Multiplayer (Japan only) – Released in March 1995, this model has the pickup head on the tray (resembling a laptop optical drive). It was made in moderate quantities before it was discontinued.
- Creative 3DO Blaster – A PC ISA expansion card with a double-speed CD-ROM drive and a controller that enables compatible Windows-based PCs to play 3DO games.
- Arcade – American Laser Games utilized 3DO-based hardware for a number of arcade titles.
- DMB-800 – Manufactured exclusively for the Korean market, after the purchase of the Opera hardware in 1997 by Samsung. This multipurpose unit could be used for 3DO software, VCD playback, and karaoke.

== Hardware ==
The original edition of the console, the FZ-1, was referred to in full as the 3DO REAL Interactive Multiplayer. The console had advanced hardware features at the time: an ARM60 32-bit RISC CPU, a custom graphics processor with a math co-processor, and a custom 16-bit DSP with a 20-bit ALU. It also featured 2 megabytes (MB) of DRAM, 1 MB of VRAM, and a double speed CD-ROM drive for main CD+Gs or Photo CDs (and Video CDs with an add-on MPEG video module). The 3DO included the first light synthesizer in a game console, converting CD music to a mesmerizing color pattern.

The optical disc format for 3DO software uses a proprietary file system named Opera. The 3DO is one of few CD-based units that feature neither regional lockout nor copy protection, making it easy to use illegal copies or homebrew software. Although there is no regional lockout for 3DO systems, a few Japanese games cannot be played on non-Japanese 3DO consoles due to a special kanji font that was not present in the English language console firmware. Games that have compatibility issues include Sword and Sorcery (which was released in English under the title Lucienne's Quest), Twinkle Knights and a demo version of Alone in the Dark.

=== Technical specifications ===
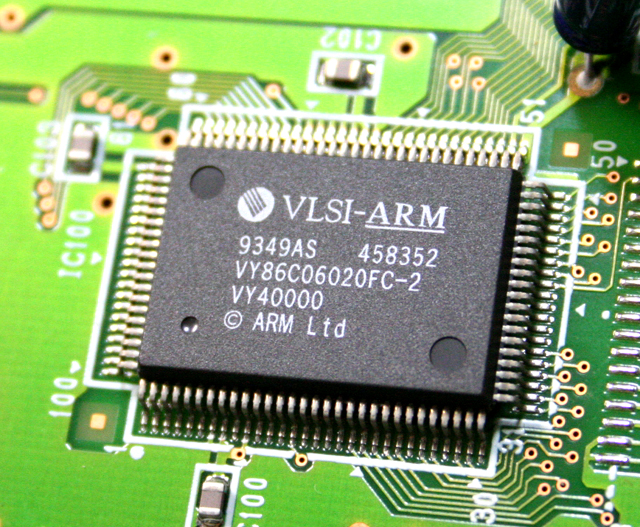
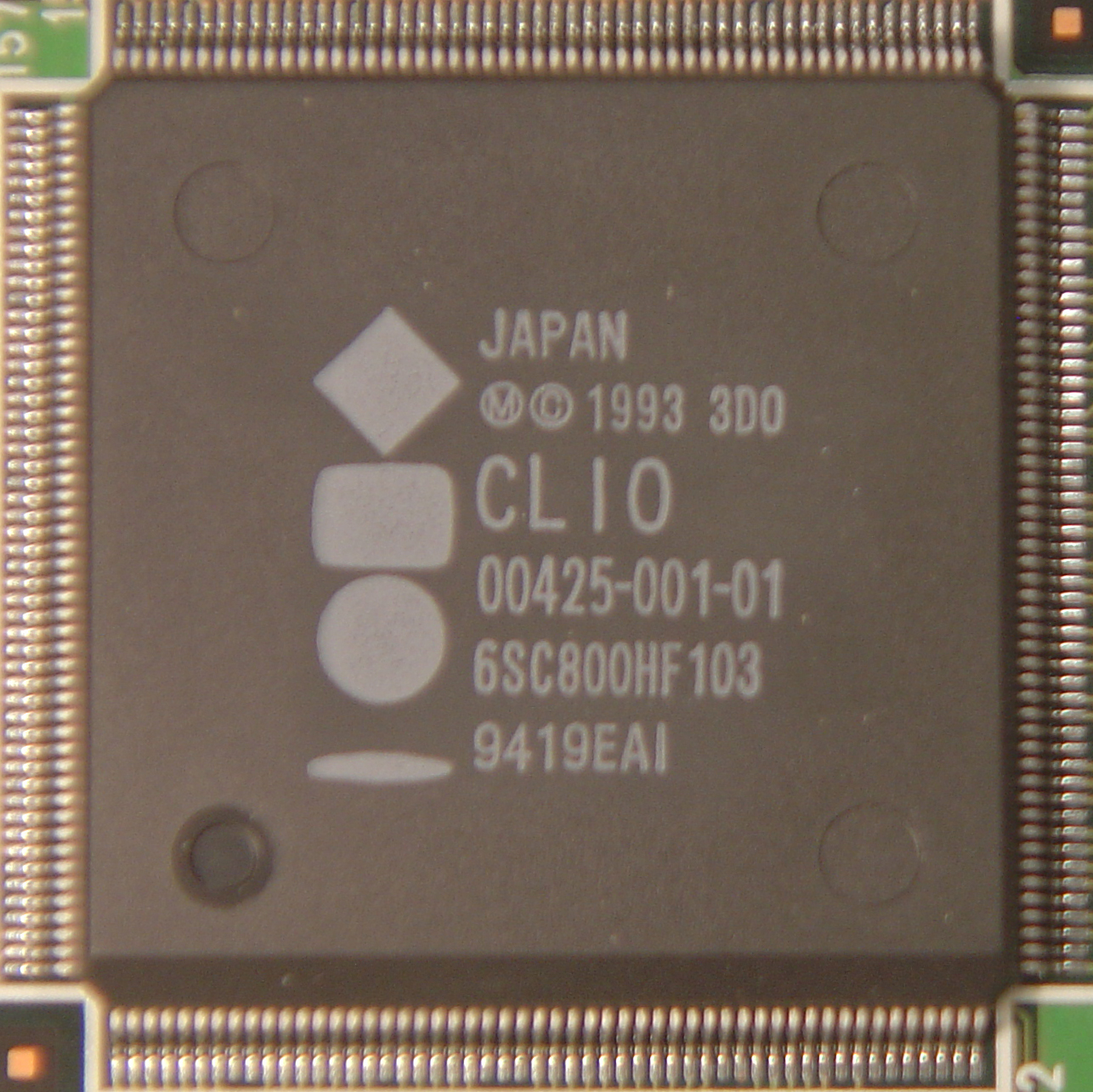
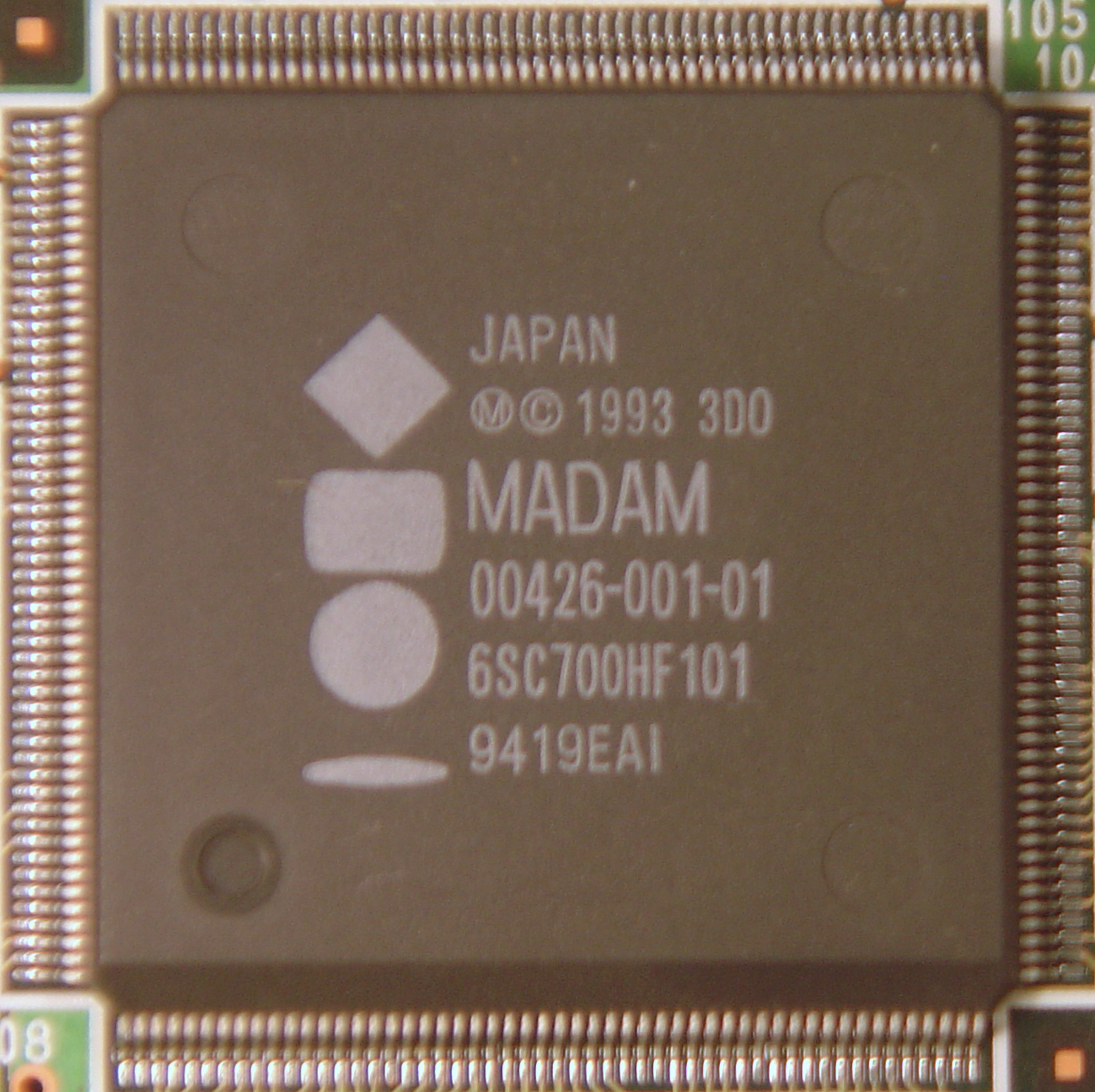
Left to right: The 3DO's RISC CPU, the Panasonic FZ-1 "Clio" DSP and "Madam" graphics accelerator

Processor

- 32-bit RISC CPU @ 12.5 MHz (ARM60) – using VY86C060-20FC / VY86C06020FC-2 (native stock speed of 20FC chips is @ 20 MHz.)

Display

- Resolution 640×480 (interpolated), 320×240 (actual) 60 Hz for NTSC version, and 768×576 (interpolated), 384×288 (actual) 50 Hz for PAL version with either 16-bit palettized color (from 24-bit) or 24-bit truecolor.
- Dual pixel engine (CEL engine) capable of producing 9–16 million pixels per second (36–64 megapix/s interpolated), distorted, scaled, rotated and texture mapped.
- Custom math co-processor (physically located inside MADAM)

System board

- 200 MByte/s (50 million words a second) Bus clocked at 50 MHz
- 36 DMA channels
- 2 MB of main RAM
- 1 MB of VRAM
- 2 expansion ports
- 32 KB SRAM

Sound

- 16-bit stereo sound
- Stereo CDDA playback.
- 44.1 kHz sound sampling rate
- Supports 4-Channel Dolby Surround sound
- Custom 16-bit digital signal processor (DSP) with 16-bit I/O and registers but a 20-bit ALU and accumulator, embedded in the CLIO chip.
- 13 DMA channels of digital input, to be sampled, and distorted by the DSP.

Media

- Double-speed 300 kB/s data transfer CD-ROM drive with 32 KB RAM buffer
- Multitasking 32-bit operating system

=== Connectivity ===
==== Audio and video ====
- RF switch An RF connector can be used with older TVs that lack direct video inputs. The 3DO output is compatible with most existing console RF switches, including those made for the NES, Super NES, Master System, Genesis, and TurboGrafx-16. This provides a relatively low quality but universally compatible video signal.
- Composite RCA The 3DO features standard composite video and audio ports (yellow/red/white RCA connectors) that are compatible with off-the-shelf cables also used on VHS players and certain other video devices and games consoles, as well as older computer video monitors.
- S-Video The 3DO also offers an S-Video connector for enhanced picture quality on more advanced televisions.

==== Power ====
All 3DO consoles have integrated power supplies. Some models (Panasonic 3DO FZ-1, Sanyo TRY 3DO, and Goldstar 3DO) have hardwired power cords, others (Panasonic 3DO FZ-10) use an IEC 60320 C7 "figure 8" power cord. All North American model specifications are AC 120 V 60 Hz 30 W.

=== Basic accessories ===
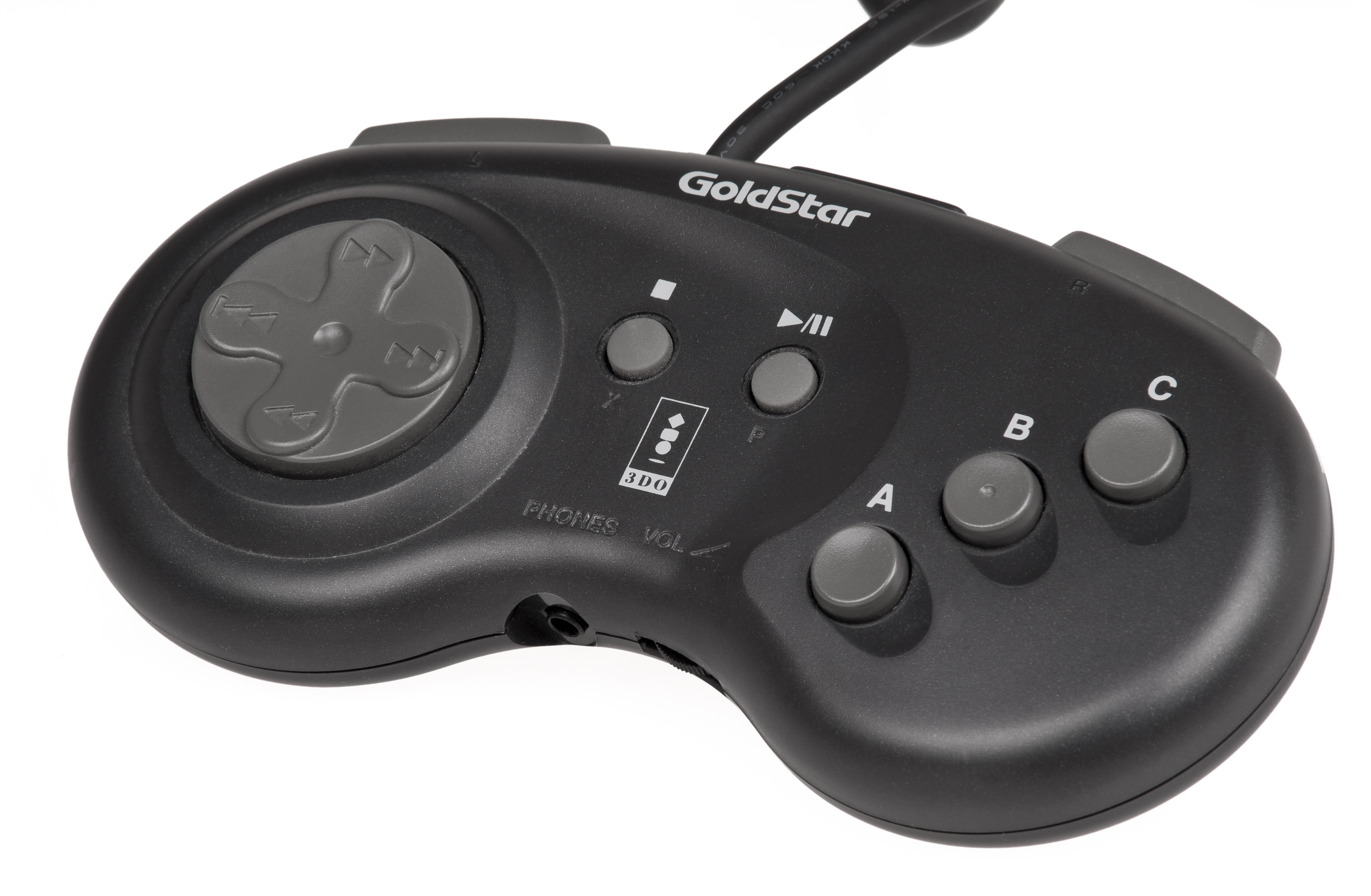
Goldstar 3DO controller

Most 3DO systems shipped with a standard controller, as well as A/V and power cables. The 3DO controllers were unusual in that the system base unit contained only one controller port and the controllers could be physically daisy chained together via a port on the top of each controller. Up to eight controllers could be linked together in this fashion. All controllers for each 3DO console are compatible with one another.

In addition, standard 3DO controllers released with the Panasonic FZ-1 also contained a headphone jack and volume control for silent play. The GoldStar (LG) model also included a controller with this feature.

Third party controllers were produced by a number of companies including Logitech. World International Trading Corporation also released an adapter that allows Super NES controllers to be used with the 3DO.

=== Light gun ===
The only light gun released for the 3DO was the Gamegun, a product of third-party developer American Laser Games. Despite this, no fewer than 10 games with light gun support were produced for the system. Most of these were arcade ports from American Laser Games (including Mad Dog McCree), but Virgin Interactive and Digital Pictures also released 3DO light gun games.

The 3DO Gamegun uses the same design as the Gamegun released for the Sega CD: an orange "Old West" revolver. Select Gameguns house a controller port so that another Gamegun may be daisy-chained for two-player gameplay, which is supported in most of American Laser Games's 3DO titles.

Though no light gun was released for the 3DO in Japan, the Japanese localizations of Demolition Man and Corpse Killer retain light gun support, and could be played by Japanese gamers using imported Gameguns.

=== Mouse ===
Panasonic and Logitech both released the 3DO mouse. The Panasonic FZ-JM1 and Logitech 3DO mouse are identical aside from their markings. Fewer than 20 games supported its use, some of which were optimized for the standard controller or light gun rather than the mouse. Of the 3DO games that were optimized for use with the mouse, the best known are Myst and Lemmings. The Panasonic mouse was also bundled with Konami's Policenauts Limited Edition in Japan that came with a Policenauts mouse pad.

=== Other ===
Home Arcade Systems released a steering wheel for the 3DO that is supported by several racing titles, including The Need for Speed.

The Panasonic FZ-EM256 is a 256 KB Expandable Memory Unit that plugs into the 3DO expansion port on the back of the console. It was released in 1994 and sold in Japan only.

The Panasonic 3DO Karaoke Mixer allows 3DO owners to play a standard music CD, turn the vocals down, plug in one or two microphones and sing over the music. This unit was released in limited markets.

== Games ==
Crash 'N Burn, the system's first bundled title

Some of the best-received titles were ports of arcade or PC games that other systems of the time were not capable of playing, such as Alone in the Dark, Myst and Star Control II. Other popular titles included Total Eclipse, Jurassic Park Interactive, Gex, Crash 'N Burn, Slayer, Killing Time, The Need for Speed, Road Rash, and Immercenary. The 3DO version of arcade title Samurai Shodown was the only port with faithful graphics for some time, and the 3DO Super Street Fighter II Turbo was the first port with its CD-quality audio.

Since its release coincided with the arrival of the modern first-person shooter, the 3DO also had some of the earliest members of the genre as exclusives, such as Escape from Monster Manor, the previously mentioned Killing Time, and PO'ed, as well as ports of Wolfenstein 3D and Doom.

The 3DO library also exhibited less successful traits of home consoles at the time. The 3DO was one of the first CD-ROM consoles, and some early titles on the 3DO frequently attempted to use interactive movie-style gameplay. Such titles rendered all or nearly all of their graphics in full motion video, which necessitated that any interactive influence from the player be limited to a greater extent than other games of the time. Some games followed a single unfolding of events simply by correctly timed prompts executed by the player. Night Trap, D, Mad Dog McCree, and The Daedalus Encounter are among the more famous examples of full motion video driven games.

== Reception ==
Reviewing the 3DO, GamePro gave it a "thumbs sideways". They commented that "The 3DO is the first CD-ROM system to make a real jump forward in graphics, sound, and game design." By contrast, they questioned if it would soon be rendered obsolete by the upcoming Jaguar CD and "Project Reality" (later released as the Nintendo 64) (Note: Though the Jaguar CD and Nintendo 64 would not be released until 1995 and 1996 respectively, at the time the media thought they would both be released in mid-1994.) and felt there were not yet enough games to justify a purchase, recommending that gamers wait several months to see if the system would get a worthwhile library of games. The 3DO was awarded Worst Console Launch of 1993 by Electronic Gaming Monthly. In a special Game Machine Cross Review in May 1995, Famicom Tsūshin would score the 3DO Real console a 26 out of 40. Next Generation reviewed the 3DO in late 1995. They noted that due chiefly to its early launch, it had a larger installed base and more high quality games than the newly launched Saturn and PlayStation, making it a viable alternative to those systems. They also debated whether it could remain a serious contender in the long run, in light of the successor M2's imminent release and the Saturn and PlayStation's superior hardware. They deemed the 3DO hardware overhyped but still very good for its time, especially praising the DMA engine. They gave it 2 out of 5 stars, concluding that it "has settled out as a solid system with some good titles in its library and more on the way. The question that must be answered though is this: Is having a 'good system' enough?"

Citing a lack of decent exclusives and an "astronomical asking price", in 2009 video game website IGN chose the 3DO as its 22nd greatest video game console of all time, slightly higher than the Jaguar but lower than its four other major competitors: Super NES (4th best), Genesis (5th), PlayStation (7th), and Sega Saturn (18th). On Yahoo! Games the 3DO was placed among the top five worst console launches due to its one-game launch lineup and high launch price.

Gaming retrospectives have also accused the 3DO of having an abundance of poor quality interactive movies. Trip Hawkins' business model for selling the 3DO was widely derided by industry figures.

== Legacy ==
The 3DO Company designed a next-generation console that was never released due to various business and technological issues. The M2 project, which began as an accelerator add-on for the 3DO, was to use dual PowerPC 602 processors in addition to newer 3D and video rendering technologies. Late during development, the company abandoned the console hardware business and sold the M2 technology to Matsushita.

Since 2020, Piko Interactive owns the 3DO logomark and is currently in charge of licensing aftermarket games for the system. This allowed Limited Run Games to re-release The Eye of Typhoon for the 3DO (alongside the MS-DOS version being emulated by DOSBox) in 2022.

== See also ==
- 3DO Rating System
- CD-i (CD Interactive): a similar but more open specification that also focused on gaming
- List of commercial failures in video games
- List of 3DO games
