= List of arcade video games: L =

This is a list of arcade video games organized alphabetically by name. It does not include PC or console games unless they were also released in video arcades. See Lists of video games for related lists.

Title	Alternate Title(s)	Year	Manufacturer	Genre(s)	Max. Players	PCB Model
L.A. Machineguns: Rage Of The Machines	—	1998	Sega	Light gun	2	
La Keyboard	—	2001	Sega			NAOMI GD-ROM
La Pa Pa	Rootin Tootin	1983	Data East			DECO
Labyrinth Runner	Trick Trap	1987	Konami		2	
Lady Bug	—	1981	Universal	Maze	2	
Lady Frog	—	1990	Mondial Games		2	
Lady Killer	Moeyo Gonta!!	1993	Yanyaka			
Lady Master: Lady Master of Kung Fu	—	1985	Taito		2	
Laguna Racer	—	1977	Midway	Racing	1	
Land Breaker	Miss Tang Ja Ru Gi ^{KOR}	1999	Eolith		2	
Land Maker	—	1998	Taito	Puzzle		
Land Sea Air Squad	Storming Party; Riku Kai Kuu Saizensen ^{JP}	1986	Taito	Multidirectional shooter	2	
Landing Gear	—	1995	Taito		1	
Landing High Japan	—	1999	Taito		1	
Las Vegas Girl: Girl '94	—	1994	Comad		2	
Laser Ghost	—	1989	Sega	Rail shooter		
Laser Grand Prix	—	1983	Taito			
Laser Quiz	—	1995	CD Express			
Laser Quiz 2	—	1995	CD Express			
Laser Quiz Greece	—	1995	CD Express			
Laser Strixx	—	1995	CD Express			
Laser Strixx 2	—	1995	CD Express			
Lasso	—	1982	SNK			
The Last Apostle Puppetshow	Reikai Doushi - Chinese Exorcist	1988	Home Data			
The Last Blade	Bakumatsu Roman - Gekka no Kenshi ^{JP}	1997	SNK	Fighting	2	
The Last Blade 2	Bakumatsu Roman Dai Ni Maku - Gekka no Kenshi : Tsuki ni Saku Hana, Chiri Yuku Hana ^{JP}	1998	SNK	Fighting	2	
The Last Bounty Hunter	—	1994	American Laser Games			
Last Bronx	—	1996	Sega			
Last Duel	—	1988	Capcom	Scrolling shooter	2	
Last Fighting	—	2000	Subsino			
Last Fortress: Paitoride	—	1994	Metro			
Last Mission	—	1986	Data East	Multidirectional shooter	2	
Last Resort	—	1992	SNK	Scrolling shooter	2	NeoGeo
Last Striker	—	1989	East Technology	Sports	2	
Last Survivor	—	1989	Sega			
Lazarian	Laser Battle	1981	Bally Midway		2	
Lazer Command	—	1976	Meadows Games			
LD Mahjong #1 Marine Blue No Hitomi	—	1991	Nichibutsu			
LD Mahjong #4 Shabon-Dama	—	1991	Nichibutsu			
LD Quiz dai 4-dan: Kotaetamon Gachi!	—	1992	Nichibutsu			
Le Pendu	—	198?	Avenir Amusement, Inc.			
Le Super Pendu	—	198?	Voyageur de l'Espace, Inc.			
LED Storm	Mad Gear ^{JP}	1988	Capcom	Racing	2	
Le Mans 24	—	1997	Sega	Racing		
Leader Board Golf	—	1988	Arcadia Systems	Sports	2	Arcadia
League Bowling	—	1990	SNK	Sports		NeoGeo
Lee Trevino's Fighting Golf	Country Club	1988	SNK	Sports		
Legend	—	1986	Kyugo			
Legend of Hero Tonma	—	1989	Irem	Platformer	2	
Legend of Heroes	—	2000	Limenko	Beat 'em up	2	
The Legend of Kage	—	1985	Taito	Beat 'em up	2	
Legend of Makai	Makai Densetsu	1988	Jaleco	Platformer	2	
The Legend of Silkroad	—	1999	Unico	Beat 'em up	2	
Legend of Success Joe	Ashita no Joe Densetsu^{JP}	1991	SNK	Beat 'em up, Boxing	2	Neo-Geo MVS
Legendary Wings	Ares no Tsubasa: The Legendary Soldiers^{JP}	1986	Capcom	Scrolling shooter, Platformer	2	
Legionnaire	Saishu Kakutou Kizoku Legionnaire	1992	TAD Corp	Beat 'em up	2	
LeMans	—	1976	Atari	Racing	1	
Leprechaun	—	1982	Tong Electronic			
Let's Dance	—	1999	DgPIX			
Let's Go Jungle! Lost on the Island of Spice	—	2006	Sega			
Lethal Crash Race	—	1993	Video System	Racing	3	
Lethal Enforcers	—	1992	Konami	Shooting gallery	2	
Lethal Enforcers II: Gun Fighters	Lethal Enforcers II: The Western^{JP}	1994	Konami	Shooting gallery	2	
Lethal Enforcers 3	Seigi no Hero^{JP}	2004	Konami	Rail shooter	2	
Lethal Justice	—	1996	The Game Room			
Lethal Thunder	Thunder Blaster ^{JP}	1991	Irem	Scrolling shooter	2	
Levers	—	1982	Rock-ola			
Libble Rabble	—	1983	Namco	Action	2	
Liberator	—	1982	Atari	Shoot 'em up	2	
Libero Grande	—	1997	Namco	Sports	2	
Lightning Fighters	Trigon ^{JP}	1990	Konami	Scrolling shooter	2	
Limited Edition Hang-On	—	1991	Sega			
Line of Fire	—	1989	Sega	Rail shooter	2	
Linky Pipe	—	1998	Eolith			
Liquid Kids	Mizubaku Daibouken	1990	Taito	Platformer	2	
Little Casino	—	1982	Digital Control			
Little Casino II	—	1984	Digital Control			
Little Robin	—	1993	TCH			
Live Quiz Show	—	1999	Andamiro			
Lizard Wizard	—	1985	Techstar		2	
Lock 'n' Chase	—	1981	Data East	Maze	2	
Lock On	—	199?	Philko			
Lock-On: Tatsumi Air Force	—	1986	Tatsumi			
Locked 'n Loaded	Gunhard ^{JP}	1994	Data East	Rail shooter	2	
Lode Runner	—	1984	Irem	Platformer	2	
Lode Runner: Golden Labyrinth	Lode Runner: Majin no Fukkatsu	1985	Irem	Platformer	2	
Lode Runner: Teikoku Kara no Dasshutsu	—	1986	Irem	Platformer	2	
Lode Runner: The Bungeling Strikes Back	—	1985	Irem	Platformer	2	
Lode Runner: The Dig Fight	—	2000	Psikyo	Platformer	2	
Logger	—	1982	Century Electronics			
Logic Pro	—	1996	Deniam			
Logic Pro 2	—	1997	Deniam			
Logic Pro Adventure	—	1999	Amuse World			ZN-1
Long Beach	—	1979	Olympia			
Long Hu Tebie Ban	—	200?	IGS			
Looper	Changes	1982	Orca	Maze Game	1	
Looping	—	1982	Video Games, GmbH			
Lord of Gun	—	1994	International Game System	Rail shooter	2	
Los Justicieros	Zorton Brothers	1993	Picmatic	Light gun	1	
The Lost Castle In Darkmist	—	1987	Taito			
Lost Tomb	—	1983	Stern Electronics	Platformer	2	
The Lost World: Jurassic Park	—	1997	Sega AM3	Rail shooter	2	
Lot Lot	—	1985	Irem Software Engineering	Puzzle	1	
Love And Berry: 3rd-5th Collection	—	2010	Sega			
Lovely Cards	—	1985	Tehkan			
Lovely Pop Mahjong JangJang Shimasho	—	1996	Visco			
Lovely Pop Mahjong JangJang Shimasho 2	—	2000	Visco			
Lover Boy	—	1983	GT Enterprise			
Loving Deads: The House of the Dead EX	—	2008	Sega			
Lucky & Wild	—	1992	Namco	Driving	2	
Lucky 9	—	198?	Nibble			
Lucky Boom	—	1996	Playmark			
Lucky Girl	—	1991	Wing			
Lucky Lady (Wing)	—	1985	Wing			
Lucky Poker	—	1981	Data East			DECO
Luigi's Mansion Arcade	—	2015	Sega		1	
Lunar Lander	—	1979	Atari	Simulator game	1	
Lunar Rescue	Galaxy Rescue	1979	Taito		2	
Lup Lup Puzzle	—	1999	Omega System			
Lupin III	—	1980	Taito			
Lupin: The Shooting	Lupin Sansei - The Shooting^{JP}	2001	Sega		2	NAOMI GD-ROM
Lupin: The Typing	—	2002	Sega		2	NAOMI GD-ROM
