= Konami Justifier =

Light gun used in video arcade and home console games

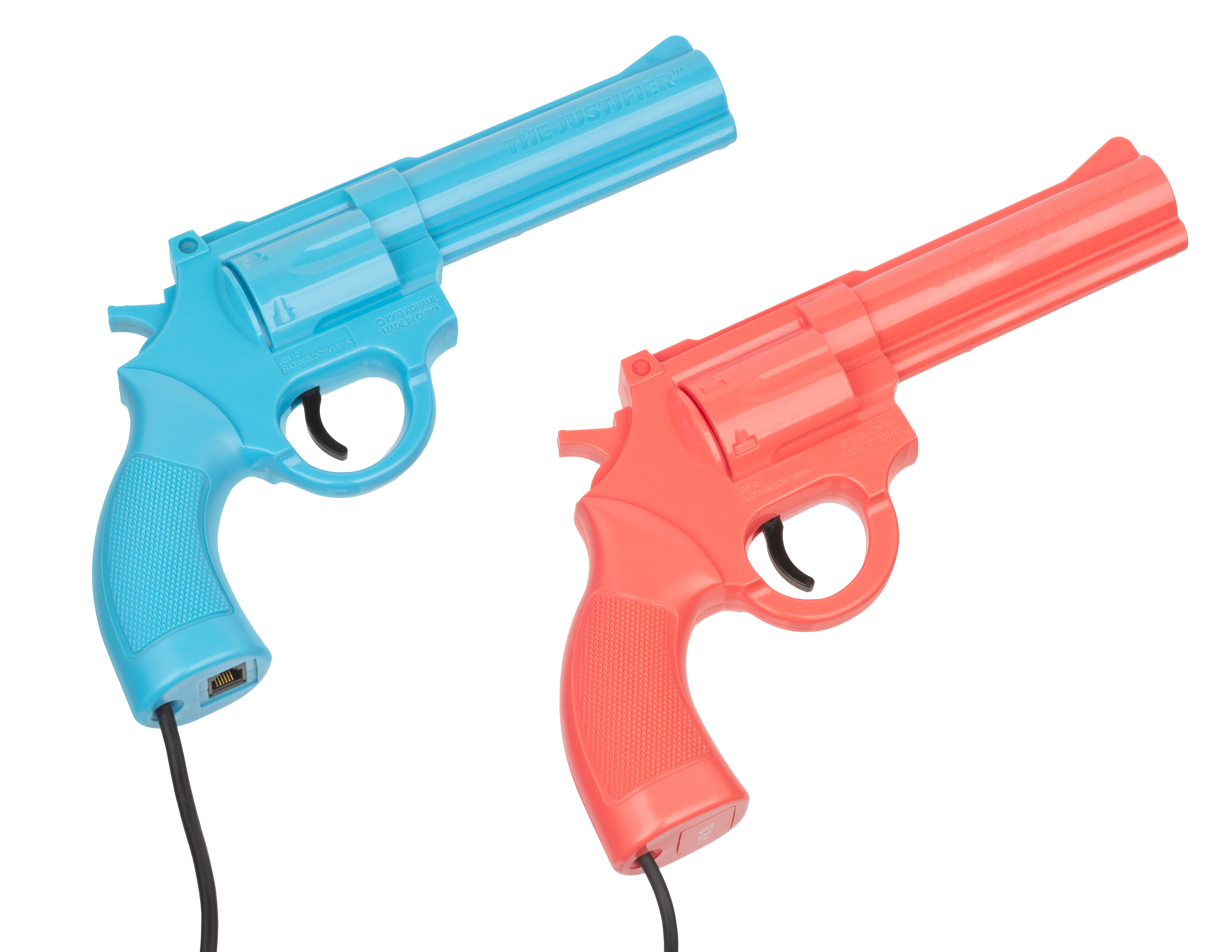
- Blue and pink Justifiers for the Sega Genesis
- Developer: Konami
- Manufacturer: Konami
- Type: Video game console peripheral
- Generation: Fourth generation
- Released: 1993
- Media: Input device

The Justifier is a light gun peripheral released by Konami for numerous home console games. Konami released versions of the gun for the Mega Drive/Genesis, Super NES, and PlayStation consoles. The original gun appeared similar to a Colt Python. The guns were originally designed for use with the home console versions of Konami's Lethal Enforcers games, although they are also compatible with other titles.

== Models ==
The Genesis and Super NES versions of the Justifier light gun were modeled after the revolver-shaped light gun controllers employed by the original Lethal Enforcers arcade game cabinet. The blue Justifier gun connects directly to the console. Optionally, a pink Justifier can be daisy chained into the blue gun for use by a second player. The pink Justifier was sold separately and is compatible with both the Super NES and Genesis models of the blue gun through a 6-pin RJ-11 phone cord. Konami opted to design its own light gun peripheral for the console versions of Lethal Enforcers, instead of supporting the first party Super Scope and Menacer light guns, in order to provide a more accurate reproduction of the arcade game at home. In Japan, the Super Famicom version of the light gun was sold as the Model 510, while the Mega Drive model kept "The Justifier" branding used overseas.

The PlayStation version of the light gun (Sony ID: SLPH-00014, SLEH-00005, SLUH-00017), sold as the Hyper Blaster in Japan and Europe, is colored green (with the Japanese model being black). The Hyper Blaster was also the first light gun for the PlayStation, preceding the release of Namco's GunCon by a few years. Project Horned Owl, a gun-shooting game published by Sony Computer Entertainment, was the first title to support it. The Hyper Blaster and the GunCon were mutually incompatible, although some games, such as Elemental Gearbolt, supported both peripherals. Additionally, some third-party lightguns were produced that support switching between Hyper Blaster and GunCon modes.

== Compatible games ==
=== Sega CD ===
- Lethal Enforcers
- Lethal Enforcers II: Gun Fighters
- Snatcher
- Crime Patrol
- Mad Dog McCree
- Mad Dog II: The Lost Gold
- Who Shot Johnny Rock?

=== Genesis/Mega Drive ===
- Lethal Enforcers
- Lethal Enforcers II: Gun Fighters

=== Super NES ===
- Lethal Enforcers

=== PlayStation ===
- Area 51
- Crypt Killer
- Die Hard Trilogy
- Die Hard Trilogy 2: Viva Las Vegas
- Elemental Gearbolt
- Lethal Enforcers I & II
- Maximum Force
- Mighty Hits Special
- Project Horned Owl
- Silent Hill: Can be used to unlock the hidden weapon "Hyper Blaster".

=== PlayStation 2 ===
- The Keisatsukan: Shinjuku Ni Juu Yon Ji [JP]
- Police 24/7 [EU]
