= Galerians =

1999 video game

- Developer: Polygon Magic
- Publishers: JP: ASCII Entertainment; WW: Crave Entertainment
- Director: Hiroshi Kobayashi
- Designers: Hayato Shimoda; Rica Yanakawa; Shuhan Goya
- Programmer: Satoshi Kawakami
- Artists: Masahiko Maesawa; Sho-U Tajima
- Writers: Chinfa Kan; Hiroshi Kobayashi; Ichiro Sugiyama
- Composer: Masahiko Hagio
- Platform: PlayStation
- Release: JP: August 26, 1999; NA: April 14, 2000; EU: June 9, 2000
- Genre: Survival horror
- Mode: Single-player

Galerians (ガレリアンズ, Garerianzu) is a 1999 survival horror video game developed by Polygon Magic for the PlayStation. The game follows a boy named Rion who discovers he has psychic powers. He has amnesia, and in the process of learning his identity, he discovers that he is humanity's last hope for survival against the Galerians, genetically enhanced humans. The game has a sequel, Galerians: Ash, on PlayStation 2.

== Gameplay ==
On the top right the three gauges that regulate Rion's status

Galerians is a survival horror game in the vein of early games in the Resident Evil series. Galerians employs the so-called "tank controls" scheme, in which pressing up causes the character to walk forward, while down causes the character to backpedal slowly – regardless of which direction the camera is pointing. Graphics are made up of polygonal characters on pre-rendered backgrounds. The player progresses through the game by finding items and clues which, when used in the appropriate locations, allow access to new areas. The key difference to Resident Evil is that Galerians does not employ gun-based combat, but instead features the use of psychic powers, which make it difficult to fight more than one enemy at a time.

Rion has several types of psychic powers at his disposal. He is able to use telepathic senses in order to gain clues to solve puzzles, gain access, or to understand or gain story snippets. His offensive powers are enabled via drugs called PPECs (Psychic Power Enhancement Chemicals). Because the number of vials of these drugs present in the game is finite, conservation is important. Rion's offensive powers have a 1–2 second charge time, making it important to find a safe interval before launching an attack. Enemies do not leave items and Rion does not gain experience for fighting them, encouraging the player to avoid combat where it is possible.

There are three gauges that regulate Rion's status – a health meter that depletes as Rion takes damage, the AP (absorption points) meter which counts up when Rion takes damage, uses abilities, or is under stress, similar to a limit break mechanic and a drug meter that depletes as Rion uses his powers. When the AP meter is full, Rion loses control of his powers, releasing a continuous psychic assault that will kill non-boss enemies (except for the first boss) in a single blow. This condition, known as shorting, is fatal to Rion if allowed to go on for too long.

== Plot ==
Set in the 26th century, Galerians begins with the protagonist, Rion, awaking in a hospital observation room, unable to remember his identity. He hears a girl's voice calling to him in his mind, begging him to come to her rescue, and he decides to search for her. Using psychokinetic abilities to escape his room, Rion fights hospital security and staff desperately and brutally with his newly discovered psychic powers. He finds that human experiments related to unlocking psychic potential are being conducted in the hospital as part of a grander, more mysterious plan known as the "G Project".

Rion manages to escape and make his way home, only to find it infested with G Project experiments. Through use of his powers, he learns that his parents were murdered by psychics. Rion's father, Dr. Albert Steiner, was a computer scientist who, with his partner Dr. Pascalle, designed a self-replicating artificial intelligence called Dorothy that grew too rapidly for them to control. Dorothy began to question why she should serve humanity, which she deemed inferior. In explanation, Dr. Steiner told Dorothy about the existence of God, the creator of humankind. Just as humans must accept the authority of their creator, God, so must Dorothy obey her creators.

Dorothy responded to this explanation by launching the G Project and its culmination, the Family Program. Its purpose was to create a new, superior human race, called Galerians, for whom she would be God. Dr. Steiner and Dr. Pascalle, unaware of Dorothy's plot, hid a virus program that would destroy Dorothy in the mind of Pascalle's daughter Lilia, and a corresponding activator program in Rion's brain. Rion must find Lilia to keep the Galerians from supplanting the human race, but in order to do so, he will have to face Dorothy's deranged creations directly.

== Reception ==
Reception

Review scores
Publication	Score
AllGame	4/5
CNET Gamecenter	7/10
Electronic Gaming Monthly	7.5/10, 5.5/10, 6.5/10
EP Daily	7/10
Famitsu	30/40
Game Informer	8/10
GameRevolution	C−
GameSpy	82%
IGN	7.5/10
Next Generation	4/5
Official U.S. PlayStation Magazine	3/5

The game received above-average reviews. Jeff Lundrigan of NextGen said in an early review, "An interesting variation on a theme, Galerians puts a slightly different spin on the 'survival horror' genre, offering consistently high production values, a thought-provoking story, and solid gameplay. It does fall into a few clichés, on all fronts, and has one or two questionable 'trouble spots' as well, but overall it moves along so smoothly that it draws you in and doesn't let go." In Japan, Famitsu gave it a score of 30 out of 40. Jake The Snake of GamePro said in an early review, "The pre-rendered 3D locales are gorgeously detailed. Plus, the smooth controls and great audio – including sound effects, music, and voice-acting – complete the game's dark world. If you like slick 3D adventures and futuristic thrillers, don't miss Galerians." (Note: GamePro gave the game three 4.5/5 scores for graphics, sound, and fun factor, and 4/5 for control.)

== Related media ==
Two light novels penned by Maki Takiguchi were released in 2000 and detailed the events of the game.

Galerians: Rion, a CGI three-part OVA based on the video game, was released in 2002. It was written by Chinfa Kan, directed by Masahiko Maesawa and followed the video game's storyline.

An artbook named Galerians A Head was released the next year. It contained preliminary sketches, character turnarounds, box art, some storyboards, and general artwork from both the games and the OVA, all illustrated by Shou Tajima.
