= Shaolin =

Shaolin may refer to:

== Religion and martial arts ==
- Shaolin Monastery, or Shaolin Temple, a Buddhist monastery in Henan province, China
- Shaolin Kung Fu, a martial art associated with the Shaolin Monastery
- Southern Shaolin Monastery, an alleged historical Buddhist monastery in Fujian province, China

== People ==
- Sándor Liu Shaolin, Hungarian short track speed skater
- Shaolin (humorist) (1971–2016), Brazilian humorist

== Arts and media ==
- Shaolin School, a fictional martial arts school based on the Shaolin Monastery, commonly featured in wuxia fiction
- Shaolin, a 2011 martial arts film
- ShaoLin, the European title of Lord of Fist, a 1999 PlayStation fighting game

== Other uses ==
- Staten Island, a borough of New York City, sometimes nicknamed "Shaolin" in pop culture (notably Wu-Tang Clan references)

== See also ==
- Shaolin Temple (disambiguation)
- Xiaolin (disambiguation)
