= Snatcher (video game) =

1988 adventure game directed by Hideo Kojima

- PC-8801 cover art
- Developer: Konami
- Publisher: Konami
- Director: Naoki Matsui
- Designer: Hideo Kojima
- Programmer: Toshiya Adachi
- Artists: Yoshihiko Ota; Tomiharu Kinoshita
- Writer: Hideo Kojima
- Composer: Masahiro Ikariko
- Platforms: PC-8801, MSX2, PC Engine, Sega CD, PlayStation, Sega Saturn
- Release: November 26, 1988: PC-8801; JP: November 26, 1988 MSX2; JP: December 13, 1988 PC-Engine Super CD-ROM²; JP: October 23, 1992 Sega CD/Mega-CD; EU: December 15, 1994; NA: January 1995 PlayStation; JP: February 12, 1996 Saturn; JP: March 29, 1996
- Genre: Graphic adventure
- Mode: Single-player

Snatcher (Note: Sunacchā (スナッチャー) in Japanese) is a cyberpunk graphic adventure game developed and published by Konami. It was written and designed by Hideo Kojima and first released in 1988 for the PC-8801 and MSX2 in Japan. Snatcher is set in a future Japanese metropolis where humanoid robots dubbed "Snatchers" have been discovered killing humans and replacing them in society. The game follows Gillian Seed, an American expat and amnesiac who joins an anti-Snatcher agency in search of his past. Gameplay takes place primarily through a menu-based interface through which the player can choose to examine items, search rooms, speak to characters, explore a semi-open world, and perform other actions.

Kojima wanted Snatcher to have a cinematic feel, so the setting and story are heavily influenced by science fiction films, like Blade Runner, Akira, The Terminator, and Invasion of the Body Snatchers. Development on the PC versions took more than twice as long as the average game of the time, even after Kojima was asked to trim more than half his initial story.

The game was released to positive reviews, but poor sales. It garnered a cult following and was remade as a role-playing game called SD Snatcher for the MSX2 in 1990. This was followed by a remake of the original adventure game using CD-ROM technology, released for the PC Engine Super CD-ROM² System in 1992. The game was originally only in Japanese. In 1994, Konami developed an English Sega CD version of Snatcher specifically for Europe and North America. Although it was a commercial failure in North America, the Sega CD version received mostly positive reviews. There is also a fan English translation for the MSX version.

Snatcher has been retrospectively acclaimed as both one of the best adventure and cyberpunk games of all time, and identified as a foundation for the themes Kojima explored later in the Metal Gear series. The game was a significant inspiration on Goichi Suda, who worked with Kojima to produce a radio drama prequel, Sdatcher. Snatcher was last rereleased in 1996 on the PlayStation and Sega Saturn. The game was also included in the PC Engine Mini in 2020, though only playable in Japanese. Its lack of availability on modern platforms has surprised industry analysts, given the game's legacy.

== Gameplay ==
The player chooses actions on text-based menus to progress the story. In this scene (from the Sega CD version), Gillian is conversing with Katrina Gibson.

Snatcher has been described as both a graphic adventure game and a visual novel. The player controls Gillian Seed as he investigates and hunts "Snatchers", dangerous humanoid robots disguised as humans roaming Neo Kobe City. The game's visuals are static images with some animations that display at the top of the screen. There is no point-and-click interface, with all actions made through a text menu with commands such as move, look, and investigate. The game's puzzles and dialogue trees are simple, lending to an emphasis on linear storytelling. Sometimes character panels are shown below the main graphics window during conversations to convey their facial expressions.

The game allows exploration of a semi-open world. There are a handful of action segments where the player shoots at enemies dispersed across a 3 × 3 grid. The Sega CD version supports the Justifier light gun packaged with Lethal Enforcers for these segments.

== Plot ==
The main cast of Snatcher. From left to right: Jean-Jack Gibson, Harry Benson, Random Hajile, Gillian Seed, Jamie Seed, Katrina Gibson, Benson Cunningham, and Mika Slayton.

Snatcher is set in 2047, over fifty years after a leaked biological weapon known as Lucifer-Alpha spread across Eastern Europe, Central Asia and the Middle East, wiping out half of the world's population, leaving the United States, Japan and the United Kingdom as the only remaining superpowers. On the artificial island metropolis of Neo Kobe City, Japan, humanoid robots dubbed "Snatchers" have been recently discovered killing humans and replacing them in society. They use an artificial skin that is nigh-impossible to tell apart from regular skin. The Neo Kobe City government quarantines the city from the outside world and establishes JUNKER, (Note: In Japanese versions, JUNKER is an abbreviation for "Judgement Uninfected Naked Kind & Execute Ranger"; in the English release, it stands for "Japanese Undercover Neuro-Kinetic Elimination Rangers".) a task force to hunt Snatchers. The player takes on the role of Gillian Seed (Yusaku Yara/Jeff Lupetin), an American expat and amnesiac who can only remember that his past, along with that of his wife Jamie (Kikuko Inoue/Susan Mele), is somehow related to Snatchers. He starts working at JUNKER in hopes that hunting Snatchers will bring his past to light.

=== Act 1: Snatch ===
After arriving at the JUNKER headquarters, Gillian Seed meets Mika Slayton (Miina Tominaga/Kimberly Harne) and Chief Benson Cunningham (Gorō Naya/Ray Van Steen), and receives a robot navigator named "Metal Gear Mk. II" (Mami Koyama/Lucy Childs) from JUNKER's engineer Harry Benson (Ryūji Saikachi/Ray Van Steen). Metal Gear receives a distress call from Jean-Jack Gibson (Isao Inoguchi/Jim Parks), the only other JUNKER agent, so Gillian travels there with Metal Gear, only to find a pair of Snatchers have beheaded him. They try to pursue the Snatchers, but are forced to make a quick escape as the factory explodes. Gillian begins searching for the identity of the Snatchers that murdered Jean-Jack, and after searching his house with the help of his daughter Katrina (Miina Tominaga/Lynn Foosaner) and speaking with his informant "Napoleon" (Gorō Naya/Jim Parks), Gillian identifies a pair of suspects. When hunting down the Snatchers, he is nearly killed but is saved by Random Hajile (Kaneto Shiozawa/Jim Parks), a Snatcher bounty hunter.

=== Act 2: Cure ===
Random joins Gillian and Metal Gear as they travel to a hospital Jean-Jack identified as suspicious during his investigation. They learn it has been abandoned for several years and harbors a secret basement where they find skeletons of Snatcher victims. Among them, they find Chief Cunningham, meaning the JUNKER chief is a Snatcher. Some Snatchers attack the group, but Random distracts them to allow Gillian and Metal Gear to escape. Back at JUNKER headquarters, Gillian speaks to Harry briefly before he dies, having been mortally wounded by the fake Chief, and kills it after taking Mika hostage. (Note: The original versions of the game (PC-8801 and MSX2) end at this point. The following events are only depicted in later versions of the game.) Immediately after this, Gillian receives a call from Jamie, telling him she has regained her memories and is being held in the "Kremlin".

=== Act 3: Junk ===
Gillian and Metal Gear travel to an abandoned church resembling the Kremlin, where they find a Snatcher factory where they are being prepared to act as humans. They also come across a plot to snatch and replace the President of the United States, and the prime ministers of the United Kingdom and Japan. Gillian then finds Jamie being held captive by a scientist named Elijah Modnar (Kaneto Shiozawa/Ray Van Steen), who explains Gillian's past. He, his father and Jamie were involved in a secret experiment undertaken by the Soviet Union over 50 years prior during the Cold War to create Snatchers, which were designed to kill and replace world leaders, giving the Soviets more power. Gillian was a CIA agent spying on the project, who married Jamie (spurring Elijah's jealousy due to his own feelings for her) and had a child with her, Harry Benson. Gillian and Jamie were placed in a cryogenic sleep when Elijah released Lucifer-Alpha into the atmosphere. The pair were saved by the army, and lost their memories due to the extended period of time they had been frozen. Corrupted by his ambitions and obsessions, Elijah explains that he has been using the Snatchers to study the effects of suspicion within human society, and reveals his intention to use them as a means of achieving world domination. He also reveals that Random was an anti-Snatcher created by his late father based on Elijah's appearance and memories, and presents his deactivated body. At this point, Random reactivates and holds Elijah at bay, allowing Gillian and Jamie to escape. Metal Gear activates an orbital weapon, which destroys the Snatcher base, killing Elijah and Random. Having learned of a larger Snatcher factory in the ruins of Moscow, Gillian prepares to embark on a mission there, hoping to destroy the menace and rekindle his marriage with Jamie.

== Development and release ==
=== PC-8801 and MSX2 ===
Science fiction cinema, especially the cyberpunk story and setting from Blade Runner (1982), pictured, were significant inspirations for Snatcher.

Snatcher was created by Hideo Kojima, working for Konami. Heavily influenced by Blade Runner (1982) and other works of cinema, he wanted to develop a game with a similar style. The game was pitched as a "cyberpunk adventure". Kojima found it difficult to explain the meaning of "cyberpunk" to Konami's trademark department over the phone. The game was originally titled Junker, but the name sounded too similar to an existing mahjong game. The title New Order was also considered. Kojima did not like the final name because his previous game, Metal Gear (1987), was also named after an enemy in the game.

Development began between Kojima and character designer Tomiharu Kinoshita, who both treated the project like making a film or anime rather than a game. They expanded to form a small team at Konami, about half the size needed for a typical Famicom game, which allowed them to work closely and quickly. The game is filled with science fiction culture references that skirt copyright laws. Kojima told Kinoshita to style the characters similar to Katsuhiro Otomo's characters in his manga Akira (1982–1990). The team never aimed for the game to have a mature atmosphere, but it naturally progressed in that direction. In addition to fourth wall breaking dialogue in the game, Kojima wanted to print a secret message and heat-activated scent on the floppy disks that could be noticed after warming them up in the disk drive, but Konami did not approve of this idea.

The development of the original versions of Snatcher lasted around 18 months. Originally Kojima planned the story in five acts, but was forced to trim them down to two due to memory constraints, ending the story in a cliffhanger. Plans for a sequel that would have contained the third through fifth act and an additional one were scrapped due to the prolonged development of the first installment. Development took about two to three times longer than the average game. Difficulties with memory constraints prompted the staff to take a break during development, at which time Kojima began to explore concepts for his later game Policenauts (1994).

Originally Snatcher was going to be a PC-8801 exclusive, but it was also developed for the MSX2 at the request of Konami. The PC-8801 version supports FM and stereo sounds via the Sound Board II expansion card while the MSX2 version came with a special cartridge that provided an expanded soundscape beyond the platform's default capabilities and extra RAM, featuring different music track arrangements. The expansion cartridge raised the price of the MSX2 version beyond that of the PC-8801 version, a reverse from the platform's typically cheaper retail game pricing. The quantity of music and sound was greater than other games at the time, and required a larger than usual sound team. Because neither platform was capable of accurately synthesizing speech, sound effects were used to represent character dialogue.

Snatcher was released for the PC-8801 on November 26, 1988, and the MSX2 on December 13 that year.

=== PC Engine ===
Snatcher features mature themes including gore and sex. Some scenes in the PC Engine version, such as the death of the Lisa Nielsen Snatcher (top), were censored when localized for the Sega CD version (bottom).

Players began asking for a home console version soon after release. Because the game was large and required several floppy disks, only CD-ROM systems were considered as opposed to systems that ran ROM cartridges. The PC Engine had the Super CD-ROM² System available so it was chosen to host Snatcher's console port. Fully titled Snatcher CD-ROMantic, this port was the first time that Konami worked with CD technology.

The team added a third act to this version, based on the extended story featured in the 1990 RPG adaptation SD Snatcher, a decision they were criticized internally for as others believed the game was already long enough. Using CD technology enabled them to add recorded speech and high quality background music. Artist Satoshi Yoshioka created the graphics for this version. Kojima wanted the visuals to appear as "cinematic" as possible, so Yoshioka pulled inspiration from Blade Runner, The Terminator (1984), and Alien (1979) to replicate their Hollywood-style special effects. He used a custom drawing application by Konami to create the character graphics, including the facial expressions during conversations. He found Gillian's expressions to be the most difficult to animate due to the complexities of his characterization.

A trial version called the Pilot Disk was released on August 7, 1992. It covers the beginning of the first act and also contains supplemental content such as character introductions, a preview trailer, and select music tracks. The full version was released on October 23, 1992 and reportedly sold well for a PC Engine game.

=== Sega CD ===
After releasing its first game on the Sega CD, Lethal Enforcers (1992), Konami wanted to bring a more interactive experience to the system for Western players. It considered making a game in full motion video like Night Trap (1992) but thought it may be too difficult, and ultimately decided to localize and port Snatcher. This also gave the Snatcher developers an opportunity to improve upon the PC Engine version which they were still not completely satisfied with. Although the Sega CD could only display 64 colors simultaneously (compared to the PC Engine's 256), the team used software techniques to increase this to 112 and modified some of the palettes to compromise.

Several scenes were censored or otherwise altered for the Sega CD release. The breasts of the deceased Lisa Nielsen Snatcher were covered up, while the sequence in which Katrina Gibson is shown standing naked in a shower was obscured, and Katrina's age was changed from 14 to 18. Some options that allowed Gillian to engage in sexual behaviors were removed or toned down, such as those that allowed him to sniff panties or stare at breasts. Audio in which a robot becomes aroused while watching a pornographic film was cut out entirely. The violence was not altered, except for one scene where a partially dead dog with twitching innards was made completely dead with no twitching. Fearing copyright issues in the United States, the clientele in a bar was changed from Kamen Rider, the Alien, and other characters to Konami characters. Feeling that the third act was too movie-like, Konami added more interactivity through additional forks and choices. Additionally, the player is now graded on how well they solved the mysteries. Setting of the story was also changed from the original year 2042 used in all the Japanese versions to 2047 for the English localization to compensate for the later release, resulting in a five years shift in every date mentioned in the script.

The game was translated by Scott Hards, with supervision from Jeremy Blaustein and Konami of Japan. The translation took about two to three months. Seven voice actors recorded about two and a half hours of dialogue for 26 different characters. With the large amount of text included in the game, the translation was expensive, and Konami felt it was the most difficult part of the porting process. Kojima was not involved with the Sega CD port and the changes to the game's content and story were made without his input. Two voice-acted scenes exclusive to this version include an extended prologue that adapts the manual comic from the previous versions, and an additional scene in the ending in which Mika and Katrina arrive to see Gillian off with Jamie before he departs to Moscow.

Snatcher was released in December 1994 in Europe and January 1995 in North America. According to Blaustein, it only sold a couple thousand copies in the United States and was ultimately a commercial failure. Retro Gamer later reported that the game also sold poorly in the United Kingdom, with the low sales of both the British and North American releases contributing to their subsequent rarity. Its poor sales have been attributed to its late release during the Sega CD's lifespan.

=== PlayStation and Sega Saturn ===
Snatcher was released once again in Japan in 1996, this time for 32-bit game consoles. A PlayStation version was released on January 26, followed by a Sega Saturn version on March 29. As with the Sega CD version, Kojima had no direct involvement with these versions, with development being handled by Konami Computer Entertainment Tokyo. The music and visuals were completely redone on both ports, with some music tracks being replaced entirely. The Saturn version, being released a bit later, has some additional graphical refinement in some drawings over the PlayStation version. Because the voice track is reused entirely from the PC Engine version with no newly-recorded material, these 32-bit versions lack the added scenes from the Sega CD version - instead the prologue comic is recreated as CGI animation on a pre-rendered video intro, and while Mika and Katrina still appears in the ending to see Gillian off with Jamie, the two characters are completely silent during the scene.

== Reception ==
Japanese reviews

Review scores
Publication	Score
Famitsu	8/10, 9/10, 8/10, 8/10 (PC-Engine); 7/10, 6/10, 8/10, 7/10 (Saturn)
Gekkan PC Engine	100/100, 85/100, 95/100, 95/100, 95/100 (PC-Engine)
Dengeki PlayStation	80/100, 80/100, 65/100, 65/100 (PS)

The PC-8801 and MSX2 versions received positive reviews in Japan and attained a cult following, but were not commercially successful. The PC Engine version also attained a following in Japan in part because of its gore. Famicom Tsushin reviewers commended its cinematic quality. The game was still listed on its "Reader's Best 20" list two years after release. Sega Saturn Magazine found the Sega Saturn version a faithful port of the PC Engine version.

=== Sega CD ===
Sega CD reviews

Review scores
Publication	Score
Computer and Video Games	90%
Electronic Gaming Monthly	9/10, 9/10, 7/10, 8/10, 9/10
Game Informer	8.5/10
GameFan	90/100, 100/100, 90/100
GamePro	16.5/20
Mean Machines Sega	85%
Next Generation	3/5
Superjuegos	94%
VideoGames & Computer Entertainment	6/10
Game Players	80%
Games World	92%
Ultimate Future Games	85%

When Snatcher arrived to the West on the Sega CD, it received praise for its story, cinematic presentation, and mature themes. It was more cinematic and told a more mature story than gamers were familiar with at the time. Mean Machines Sega felt Snatcher was more substantial than other adventure games, calling it "one of the most involved storyboards and backgrounds of any video game". The game's writing was generally lauded, but VideoGames and Game Players felt its juvenile and lighthearted humor sometimes conflicted from its otherwise serious tone, with VideoGames writing that it suffers from Japanese "cuteness". A reviewer at GameFan called it "one of the longest, most involving games" he had played in a long time. He wrote: "Never before have I played – nay experienced – a game this moving, dramatic, gore-riddled, MA-17, adult". The magazine praised Konami for retaining most of the mature content. The reviewers of Games World magazine praised the game for having a "gripping" and "engrossing" storyline. Computer and Video Games said it was "one of the most compelling role playing games" with an "engrossing" story that is clever, "well put together, atmospheric and sometimes genuinely funny," while comparing it favorably to 1980s science fiction films and Quentin Tarantino's Pulp Fiction (1994).

Mean Machines Sega believed Snatcher's presentation was heightened through the use of CD-ROM technology, which supported the digitized voices and high quality graphics. Some critics praised the English voice acting and writing, though Next Generation thought Konami could have contracted better actors. Dave Perry of Games World said the "Japanese animé graphics coupled with crisp game speech bring to life an RPG adventure with an edge." Other magazines also discussed the graphics in a positive light, although the graphics were criticized by Computer and Video Games as "dated" and VideoGames as "generic". GamePro liked the Japanese anime style graphics and felt that combined with the writing, it drew players into the story. However, its reviewer criticized the music, calling it "old-fashioned for a cyberpunk adventure", while Mean Machines Sega compared it positively to John Carpenter-style incidental themes.

Critics felt the game was slow moving at times, but rewarded patient players. GamePro wrote that it rewards "patience, persistence, and plodding". VideoGames felt the story was "nothing mind-blowing" but interesting enough to keep the player invested. Dave Perry of Games World said interaction "is varied and there are enough options to prevent it from being too linear." Ultimate Future Games, however, felt the game was too linear, and leaned too heavily on the illusion of choice when the story could only be advanced by completing tasks in a certain order. Mean Machines Sega felt the puzzles were challenging and the game was considerably longer and more substantial than Rise of the Dragon (1990), another cyberpunk adventure game. Computer and Video Games felt the gun shooting sections were weak and disappointing.

=== Retrospective ===
Snatcher has been called one of the best adventure games and best cyberpunk games of all time. In 1997, Electronic Gaming Monthly ranked the Sega CD version the 69th best console video game of all time on the sole basis of the game's story content, remarking that "not many people have played it, but almost everyone knows of its grisly story line." It has continued to receive praise for its story and presentation. Waypoint wrote that its narrative and visuals hold up, in contrast to most Sega CD and cyberpunk adventure games. Kotaku called it a "science fiction cornucopia" and liked how the game explored topics of human existence and the fear of machines replacing humans. It felt the game was heavily influenced by science fiction films including Blade Runner, The Terminator, Akira, and Invasion of the Body Snatchers (1956). Other publications also picked up on these inspirations, especially that from Blade Runner. Retro Gamer felt it was ironic how the game was more cinematic than games using full motion video. Destructoid enjoyed the plot, but complained about the interface. AllGame wrote that text-based menu driven games like Snatcher can become tedious, but felt the storyline and graphics made Snatcher worth its time.

== Legacy ==
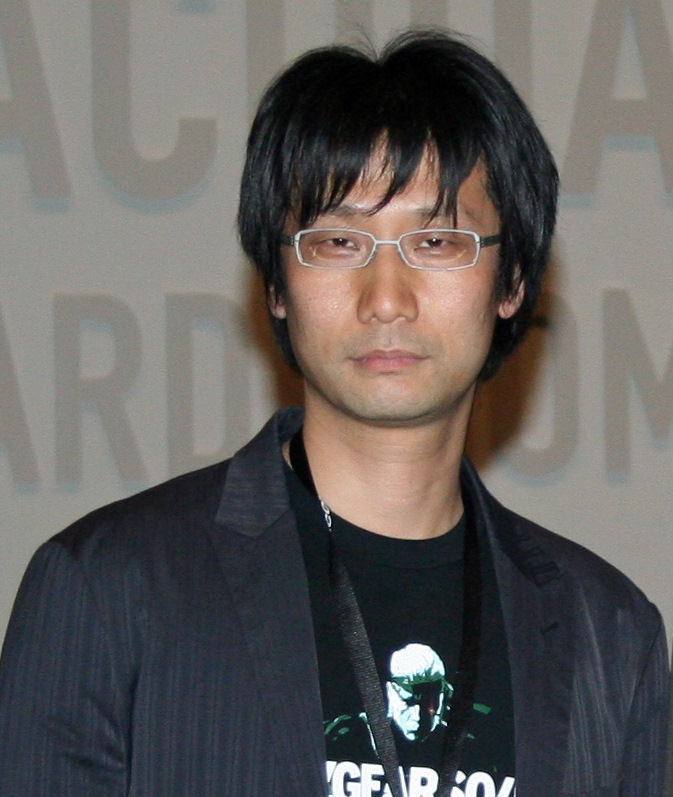
Hideo Kojima in 2007

Critics have discussed Snatcher as setting the stage for Kojima's later works. 1UP.com felt the game demonstrated his love for film and was "more of a cerebral affair than some of [his] other efforts, but his ingenuity and attention to detail helped make this game especially noteworthy". Game Informer wrote that Snatcher foreshadowed Kojima's use of science fiction to explore philosophy, sex, and the human condition in Metal Gear Solid. Snatcher remains one of Kojima's most renowned games, but is often overshadowed by the Metal Gear Solid series.

The game has obtained a cult following. It has been an influence on other science fiction works, including Project Itoh's novel Genocidal Organ, and the 2015 adventure game 2064: Read Only Memories. Kojima has expressed interest in reviving Snatcher in some capacity, and has explained he does not have the time to work on the project himself but would welcome another director to lead it. According to him, such a project has never been feasible from a business perspective, and in 2011, said that a sequel would need to sell over half a million copies to make sense financially. Kojima left Konami in 2015, and the game remains a property of the company, which has not expressed interest in reviving it, either through a rerelease or sequel.

The game's lack of availability on modern platforms has surprised critics. Some believed it would play well on a Nintendo DS or 3DS, following the footsteps of successful graphic adventures on those platforms like Hotel Dusk and Phoenix Wright. The Sega CD version remains the sole release in Western territories. Demand has driven up the prices on these copies on the secondary market, making emulation a more reasonable option for most players. Japanese copies are far cheaper but the game's text-based nature makes it difficult for non-Japanese readers. The PC Engine version is included in the TurboGrafx-16 Mini, but only in the original Japanese. Fans have experimented with porting the game to other systems. A demo of an early part of the game was made for the Virtual Boy in 2015, complete with stereoscopic 3D effects and PCM music. Another fan experimented with porting it to the Dreamcast with a remixed soundtrack and retouched visuals.

Snatcher was the first translation project for Jeremy Blaustein, who went on to translate Kojima's Metal Gear Solid (1998). Blaustein launched a crowdfunding campaign on Kickstarter for a steampunk adventure game titled Blackmore in 2014. The game was to be directed by Blaustein with former Snatcher staff making up other parts of the team. It did not meet its funding goal.

=== SD Snatcher ===
SD Snatcher
- MSX2 cover art
- Developer: Konami
- Publisher: Konami
- Producer: Yutaka Haruki
- Designers: Yoshihiko Ota; Hideo Kojima
- Programmers: Toshiya Adachi; Tomohiro Ishimoto
- Artists: Masashi Sakurai; Tomiharu Kinoshita; Kayo Yoshimoto
- Writers: Yoshihiko Ota; Hideo Kojima
- Composer: Masahiro Ikariko
- Platform: MSX2
- Release: JP: April 27, 1990
- Genre: Role-playing game
- Mode: Single-player

Snatcher was remade into a role-playing game called SD Snatcher for the MSX2, released on April 27, 1990. "SD" stands for "super deformed" in Japanese media, another way to reference chibi character designs. The game plays from a top-down perspective, where the player controls Gillian as he ventures through the environment. When the player encounters an enemy on the field, the game shifts to a first-person battle mode. The player must shoot down enemies using one of many different guns. Different parts of an enemy can be targeted and different weapons have varying abilities and ranges. Like the MSX2 version of Snatcher, SD Snatcher consists of three floppy disks with game data and a sound cartridge equipped with the SCC chip.

SD Snatcher was developed by Konami due to the company's desire to create an RPG in an unusual futuristic setting, choosing to adapt the story and setting of Snatcher for such a game. While the original versions of Snatcher released in 1988 ended the story in an inconclusive matter due to the cancellation of the planned sequel, SD Snatcher adds an additional segment that continues the story from where the prior version left off (this added portion served as the basis for the third act added in later console ports of the original Snatcher). Initially Hideo Kojima was not involved with the development of SD Snatcher, as he was busy with Metal Gear 2: Solid Snake at the time, but he and his team were brought in during the late stages of development to help complete SD Snatcher smoothly so they could resume development of Solid Snake. It was translated by the Dutch-based group Oasis in 1993, making it one of the earliest documented fan translations.

=== Manga ===
A manga adaptation of Snatcher by illustrator Osamu Kobayashi (with assistance by Mahiro Maeda and Koichi Noda) was serialized in the monthly manga anthology magazine ASCII Comics published by the ASCII Corporation (now Enterbrain) in 1993 for seven issues. Aside from being set in Neo Kobe City in the year 2042, the story of the manga was otherwise unrelated to that of the game, focusing on a new JUNKER runner named Nirasawa who must protect an exotic dancer from a gang of bioroids pursuing her. No tankobon collection or foreign translations were ever made.

=== Sdatcher ===
An episodic radio drama prequel, Sdatcher, (Note: The title Sdatcher is a portmanteau of "Suda" and "Snatcher".) was released in 2011 through a collaboration between Kojima and game designer Goichi Suda. Suda credited Snatcher, along with works by Yu Suzuki, for igniting his interest in video games. He asked Kojima if he wanted to make a new game together, and the project led to a radio drama. It was announced in 2007. The script was written by Suda, and the music was composed by Akira Yamaoka, who worked for Suda in his Grasshopper Manufacture studio and worked on the Silent Hill series. Original Snatcher artist Satoshi Yoshioka did promotional illustrations. The first act was released in September 2011 with new acts released every other week through November that year. It was distributed for free and later sold on CDs. It was later translated by fans.
