= Xiaolin =

Xiaolin may refer to:

- Siaolin Village (小林里), village in Jiasian District, Kaohsiung, Taiwan, Republic of China
- Xiaolin, Cixi (逍林镇), town in Cixi City, Zhejiang, People's Republic of China
- Xiaolin, Sui County (小林镇), town in Sui County, Suizhou, Hubei, China
- Zhu Xiaolin (朱晓琳), Chinese long-distance runner
- Xiaolin Showdown, American animated television series
- Xiaolin Chronicles, American French animation television series

== See also ==
- Shaolin (disambiguation)
- Shaolin Temple (disambiguation)
