= Shaolin Temple (disambiguation) =

Shaolin Monastery or Shaolin Temple is a Buddhist monastery in Henan province, China.

Shaolin Temple or Shaolin Monastery may also refer to:

- Southern Shaolin Monastery, Buddhist monastery in Fujian, China
- Shaolin Temple (1976 film), a martial arts film by Chang Cheh
- Shaolin Temple (1982 film), a martial arts film starring Jet Li
- Shaolin Temple UK, martial arts school and centre for study of Shaolin culture in the United Kingdom

== See also ==
- Shaolin (disambiguation)
- Xiaolin (disambiguation)
