= Galerians: Rion =

Japanese OVA series

ガレリアンズ：リオン (Garerianzu: Rion)
- Genre: Science fiction, horror
- Original video animation
- Directed by: Masahiko Maesawa
- Written by: Chinfa Kan
- Studio: Enterbrain, Polygon Magic
- Licensed by: AUS: Warner Vision; NA: Image Entertainment
- Released: 24 April 2002
- Runtime: 73 minutes
- Episodes: 3

Galerians: Rion (ガレリアンズ：リオン, Garerianzu: Rion) is a 2002 animated OVA based on the 1999 PlayStation video game Galerians. Originally released by Enterbrain in Japan in three episodes, Galerians: Rion was later combined into a single feature, licensed for the North America by Image Entertainment, and broadcast on MTV2 on 3 July 2004.

Galerians: Rion is set in the 26th century, and the human residents of Earth are under attack from a supercomputer called Dorothy. Intent on eliminating the human race, Dorothy faces some stiff competition from Rion Steiner, a teenager with superhuman powers.

== Plot ==
A 16-year-old boy named Rion one day wakes up in a hospital observation room. Having no memories of his past or how he got there, a mysterious voice of a girl begs him to save her. While he is trying to escape, he discovers he has psychic powers.

Using this ability he kills off the staff and hospital security. He finds out he needs to take drugs for not losing control; using different drugs gives Rion a different ability. Rion discovers that in the hospital, they are having human experiments, named "G Project", related to his powers. He also finds out information about himself.

Having finally escaped, he goes home, memories coming back to him, but is interrupted by G Project experiments/monsters and a Galerian named Birdman. He soon finds the girl who called out to him is a childhood friend named Lilia, who is also the daughter of Dr. Pascalle, a colleague of Rion's father, who wants to help Rion destroy an artificial intelligence named Dorothy. Dorothy was a super computer program made to serve humans. However, she started to wonder why she should help humanity. One of her creators, Dr. Steiner, told Dorothy about the existence of God and how humans must serve their creator as she must serve humans. Dorothy responds to this by starting a secret program to create super-humans named Galerians, plotting to use them to kill off humanity and rule Earth being served by her Galerians. Throughout the story, the Galerians are also after Lilia, as she has a virus program implanted in her brain as a safeguard against Dorothy.

Dorothy sends her Galerians after Rion and Lilia. It is up to Rion to kill the Galerians, destroy Dorothy and save humanity. Rion comes face-to-face to the last Galerian, Cain, who is a clone of the real Rion, and he finds out the horrible truth: he himself is a Galerian – a clone of the real Rion who died a while ago. Killing off Cain, Rion confronts and battles Dorothy and uses all his powers to destroy her.

Lying in Lilia's arms, Rion says his last words and dies. In the end, the scene changes. In a completely white area, Rion is seen sitting down with his head low and finally disappears into thin air, symbolizing his death.

== Voice cast ==
Character name	Japanese voice actor	English voice actor
Rion Steiner	Akira Ishida	Dave Wittenberg
Lilia	Shiho Kikuchi	Kari Wahlgren
Birdman	Takehito Koyasu	Peter Doyle
Rita	Yuka Imai	Lia Sargent
Rainheart	Kenichi Suzumura	Dave Mallow
Cain	Akira Ishida	Dave Wittenberg
Dorothy	Ryōko Kinomiya	Laura Coyle
Elsa Steiner	Miho Yamada	Kari Wahlgren
Drug Dealer	Masahiro Okazaki	Steve Cassling
Dr. Rem	Tomomichi Nishimura	Michael McConnohie
Dr. Steiner	Kinryū Arimoto	Michael McConnohie
Dr. Pascalle	Kazuo Oka	Dave Mallow

== DVD release ==
Galerians: Rion was released on DVD in Japan in three separate volumes on 24 April 2002. The OVA saw a North American DVD release on 6 April 2004 and a UMD release on 25 October 2005. The DVD was packaged with a 14-song soundtrack featuring music from the English version of the OVA. The musical artists include Slipknot, Skinny Puppy, Adema, Godhead, Sevendust, Fear Factory, and Andy Hunter.

=== Track listing ===
1. "Co-Dependent" by Adema
2. "The Hate in Me" by Godhead
3. "T.O.A.B." by Sevendust
4. "The Unseen Tears of the Albacore (Evil Remix)" by The Vandals
5. "Gently" by Slipknot
6. "Archetype (Remix)" by Fear Factory
7. "Go" by Andy Hunter
8. "Lust" by Balligomingo (Note: The track "Lust" on the album is actually another song by Balligomingo called "Lost". It isn't explained why this mistake was never brought up or corrected.)
9. "Spasmolytic (Deftones Remix)" by Skinny Puppy
10. "The Mountain" by DevilDriver
11. "Heaven" by Opiate for the Masses
12. "Beautiful Misery" by Freakhouse
13. "Hey Kid!" by The Ataris
14. "Elevate" by Balligomingo
