= Vs. (video game) =

1997 video game

- North American box art
- Developer: Polygon Magic
- Publisher: THQ
- Producer: Greg Gibson
- Designers: Kentaro Miyazaki, Masahito Saito, Satoshi Kawakami, Yoshikazu Fujita, Takayuki Watanabe
- Platform: PlayStation
- Release: NA: December 2, 1997; PAL: June 12, 1998
- Genre: Fighting game
- Modes: Single-player, multiplayer

Vs. is a 1997 3D fighting video game for the PlayStation, developed by Polygon Magic and published by THQ. It is an American localized and reworked version of Fighters' Impact by Japanese publisher Taito. Vs. features 20 gang-based characters, designed by former Marvel Comics artist Kurtis Fujita, brawling in a two-dimensional environment. Players select different members of each gang to fight rival gangs on their respective turfs. Vs. was met with an underwhelming critical response, being said to offer little new over the recent top-tier games in the fighting genre, and dropped into obscurity.

== Gameplay ==
Gameplay screenshot

Players select a game mode to play then select one of the sixteen initially available fighters based on American gang stereotypes. Each fighter represents one of four different street gangs. Four bosses become available for selection upon certain conditions being met. Twelve different arenas based on real-life locations are used for combat. Fighting styles used include karate, aikido and kung fu.

== Playable Characters ==
Streets

- Mia
- Oleg
- Slim Daddy
- Vikram

Hood

- Jalil
- Paco
- Ramos
- Thana

Campus

- Harold
- Kathleen
- Leath
- O'Doul

Beach

- Calucag
- Kara
- Kenny
- Mineo

Bosses

- Eric O
- Hendrickson
- Joel
- Neige

== Development ==
The title is a port and localized version of Fighters' Impact which was released in Japanese arcades in September 1996, retaining the game engine, most of the play mechanics, and some animations and other elements, but introducing an entirely new lineup of characters, new arenas, and a soundtrack of licensed music.

The characters were designed by former Marvel Comics artist Kurtis Fujita. According to Fujita, "The main idea and theme of Vs. was to create a game which had characters that Americans could identify with, while still maintaining the visual flair of Japanese anime and manga." Some of the characters, such as Harold, were designed by Fujita on spec, before he knew of the street gang theme that THQ wanted for the game. The characters were animated using motion capture footage recorded at Polygon Magic's Tokyo studios.

The soundtrack includes music by Razed in Black, Los Infernos, Suicide Machines, and Pigs in Space.

== Fighters' Impact ==
Fighters' Impact
- Developer: Polygon Magic
- Publisher: Taito
- Directors: Nakaaki Kuroki (arcade), Eiji Takeshima (console)
- Artist: Shinkaida Tetsuyaro
- Composer: Yasuhisa Watanabe
- Platforms: Arcade, PlayStation
- Release: Arcade; WW: September 1996 PlayStation; JP: April 25, 1997
- Genre: Fighting
- Modes: Single-player, multiplayer

Fighters' Impact is a 1996 fighting game from Taito, developed by Polygon Magic, on which Vs. is based on. It was released on PlayStation in Japan only, with Polygon Magic using it to rework it into a distinct Vs. for the American and PAL markets.

Control is through three buttons of shift, punch and kick. Each fighter (excluding Yukiwo) also has three different choices of fighting styles: a main technique at which they excel and two sub-styles which could be either aikido, wrestling, boxing, karate, or else. This creates a wide variety of moves.

Playable Characters: Bernhard, Hornet, Kaede, Mark, Sanson, Shiroh, Silene, Yukiwo, Faraha, Hoihoi, Raoul, Dr. Wiz, and Leon.

Yasuhisa Watanabe composed the game's music. Zuntata Records released the official soundtrack CD in November 1996.

== Reception ==
Reception

Aggregate score
Aggregator	Score
GameRankings	57%

Review scores
Publication	Score
Electronic Gaming Monthly	5.625/10
IGN	4/10

Reviews for Vs. were mediocre, with most critics commenting that while the game is decent at worst in every respect, it fails to hold up against its contemporaries. GamePro, for example, summed up that "Vs. is an extremely competent game with the misfortune of stumbling into some bad timing. If it had been released, say, 18 months ago, it would've been the greatest thing since sliced bread and probably could've started its own religion. Unfortunately, Vs. offers nothing new to the already solid lineup of 32-bit 3D fighting games established by Tekken 2, Soul Blade, and Fighters Megamix." Common subjects of criticism were the unimaginative characters and the lack of variety in the moves. Reviewers for both Electronic Gaming Monthly and IGN also said the character models are too blocky, but GamePro considered them a highlight, stating that "The motion-captured characters are built well, if not a little blocky, and really move according to their unique fighting styles."

Most critics also found the frame rate impressively high, the evade move a strong feature, and the music both catchy and appropriate to the action. Sushi-X of Electronic Gaming Monthly said that "The music really saves much of the game for me", though he and co-reviewer Shawn Smith found the opponent A.I. absurdly difficult to the point where it takes the fun out of the single-player mode. IGN concluded that "Vs. is a decent start for a company looking to get into the fighting market, it's just not as accomplished as other fighters, even Tekken."
