= Madara (manga) =

Japanese media franchise

- MADARA
- Cover of the English-translated first volume of the manga, featuring Madara

魍魎戦記MADARA (Mōryō Senki MADARA)
- Genre: Adventure, Supernatural
- Manga
- Written by: Eiji Ōtsuka
- Illustrated by: Shōu Tajima
- Published by: Kadokawa Shoten
- English publisher: NA: CMX Manga
- Imprint: Dragon Comics (Volumes 1-7); Dengeki Comics EX (Volumes 8-10)
- Magazine: Marukatsu Famicom (1987–1990); Marukatsu Super Famicom (1990–1992); Dengeki Super Famicom (1992–1994)
- Original run: 1987 – 1994
- Volumes: 10
- Manga parts
- 1. Mōryō Senki MADARA (1987–1990, 4 volumes); 2. Mōryō Senki MADARA: BASARA (1990–1992, 3 volumes); 3. Mōryō Senki MADARA: LASA (1992–1994, 3 volumes)
Further information
Manga
MADARA: Tensei-hen
Written by	Eiji Ōtsuka
Illustrated by	Shōu Tajima
Published by	MediaWorks
Imprint	Dengeki Comics EX
Original run	1990 – 1991
Volumes	1
Video game
Mōryō Senki MADARA
Developer	Konami
Publisher	Konami
Genre	Role-playing video game
Platform	Famicom
Released	March 30, 1990
Original video animation
Directed by	Yuji Moriyama
Produced by	Ayumitsu Enomoto; Haruki Kadokawa; Kazuhiko Ikeguchi; Ken Takano; Minoru Takanashi; Nagateru Kato
Written by	Akinori Endo
Music by	Kaoru Wada
Studio	Studio Fantasia
Licensed by	NA: Media Blasters
Released	March 21, 1991 – December 20, 1991
Runtime	70 minutes (each)
Episodes	2
Video game
Mōryō Senki MADARA 2
Developer	Konami
Publisher	Konami
Genre	Role-playing video game
Platform	Super Famicom
Released	July 16, 1993
Video game
Mōryō Senki Madara: Daikongō Rinhen
Developer	Kogado Studio
Publisher	Kogado Studio
Genre	Role-playing video game
Platform	NEC PC-9821
Released	September 10, 1993
Video game
Madara Saga: Yōchien Senki MADARA
Developer	Datam Polystar
Publisher	Datam Polystar
Genre	Role-playing video game
Platform	Super Famicom
Released	January 26, 1996

MADARA (Note: Japanese: 魍魎戦記MADARA, Hepburn: Mōryō Senki MADARA; "Demons and Monsters War Chronicle: Madara") is a Japanese manga series written by Eiji Ōtsuka and illustrated by Shōu Tajima. Originally published from 1987 to 1990 it is set in a mythological era in Japan and tells the story of Madara, a goodhearted teenage boy who uses fantastic prosthetic limbs called "gimmicks" and a legendary sword to fight his own father, the evil overlord Miroku. The franchise has also spawned video games and a two-part OVA.

== Media ==
=== Anime ===
A two-episode OVA directed by Yuji Moriyama was released in 1991.

=== Video games ===
The Famicom video game Mōryō Senki MADARA was a Konami 1990 release that was never localized. It was large for its time at 4 megabits, and used the "VRC6" sound enhancement mapper chip that was also used in Akumajō Densetsu, the Japanese version of Castlevania III: Dracula's Curse. It differed from the Final Fantasy and Dragon Quest RPGs of the time in that it had movement around battlefields rather than stationary turn-by-turn movements. An orchestrated soundtrack was released by Konami's KuKeiHa CLUB on April 21, 1990.

A sequel to the Famicom Madara, Mōryō Senki MADARA 2, was released for the Super Famicom in 1993. It was released on a 12-megabit cartridge.

Also in 1993, the PC-98 title Mōryō Senki Madara: Daikongō Rinhen was developed and published by Kogado Studio.

Finally, the spin-off RPG game Madara Saga: Yōchien Senki Madara was released for the Super Famicom by Datam Polystar in 1996. It is a comedic adaptation that portrays the heroes as kindergarteners.

== Volumes ==
=== Mōryō Senki MADARA ===
==== Original release (Dragon Comics) ====
No.	Japanese release date	Japanese ISBN
01	August 16, 1989	9784049260120
02	August 16, 1989	9784049260137
03	February 21, 1990	9784049260182
04	June 28, 1990	9784049260212

==== 1993 - 1994 Re-Release (Dengeki Comics EX) ====
Released as MADARA One (Note: MADARA壱, MADARA Ichi)

No.	Japanese release date	Japanese ISBN
01	August 25, 1993	9784073002512
02	August 25, 1993	9784073002680
03	June 27, 1994	9784073016878
04	June 27, 1994	9784073016939

==== 1996 Re-Release (Kadokawa Comics A) ====
No.	Original release date	Original ISBN	North American release date	North American ISBN
01	August 28, 1996	9784047131521	November 1, 2004	9781401205294
02	August 28, 1996	9784047131538	February 1, 2005	9781401205300
03	September 27, 1996	9784047131545	May 1, 2005	9781401205317
04	September 27, 1996	9784047131552	August 1, 2005	9781401205324
05	October 29, 1996	9784047131569	November 1, 2005	9781401205331

==== 2017 - 2018 Re-release (Kadokawa) ====
Released as MADARA ARCHIVES Mōryō Senki MADARA (Note: MADARA ARCHIVE 魍魎戦記MADARA)

No.	Japanese release date	Japanese ISBN
01	December 29, 2017	9784041065082
02	February 2, 2018	9784041065099

=== Mōryō Senki MADARA: BASARA ===
Originally serialized as Mōryō Senki MADARA 2 (Note: 魍魎戦記MADARA摩陀羅弐, Mōryō Senki MADARA Ni)

==== Original Release (Dragon Comics) ====
No.	Japanese release date	Japanese ISBN
01(05)	March 11, 1991	9784049260250
02(06)	December 5, 1991	9784049260328
03(07)	May 25, 1992	9784049260342

==== 1997 Re-Release (Kadokawa Comics A) ====
No.	Japanese release date	Japanese ISBN
01	April 7, 1997	9784047131613
02	May 28, 1997	9784047131620
03	May 28, 1997	9784047131637

==== 2018 Re-release (Kadokawa) ====
Released as MADARA ARCHIVES Mōryō Senki MADARA: BASARA (Note: MADARA ARCHIVES 魍魎戦記摩陀羅BASARA)

No.	Japanese release date	Japanese ISBN
01	April 4, 2018	9784041065112

=== Mōryō Senki MADARA: LASA ===
==== Original Release (Dengeki Comics EX) ====
No.	Japanese release date	Japanese ISBN
01	May 26, 1993	9784073000969
02	March 25, 1994	9784073008835
03	September 9, 1994	9784073019022

==== 1996 - 1997 Re-Release (Kadokawa Comics A) ====
No.	Japanese release date	Japanese ISBN
01	October 29, 1996	9784047131576
02	January 29, 1997	9784047131583
03	January 29, 1997	9784047131590

==== 2018 Re-release (Kadokawa) ====
Released as MADARA ARCHIVES Mōryō Senki MADARA: LASA (Note: MADARA ARCHIVES 魍魎戦記MADARA赤)

No.	Japanese release date	Japanese ISBN
01	March 2, 2018	9784041065105

=== MADARA: Tensei-Hen ===
==== Original Release (Dengeki Comics EX) ====
No.	Japanese release date	Japanese ISBN
01	October 10, 1994	9784073020509

==== 1997 Re-Release (Kadokawa Comics A) ====
No.	Japanese release date	Japanese ISBN
01	April 7, 1997	9784047131606
