= Galerians: Ash =

2002 video game

- Developer: Polygon Magic
- Publishers: JP: Enterbrain; NA: Sammy Studios; PAL: Sammy Europe
- Director: Hiroshi Kobayashi
- Producer: Ichiro Sugiyama
- Programmer: Ichiro Harada
- Artists: Shou Tajima; Masahiko Maesawa
- Writers: Chinfa Kang; Ichiro Sugiyama
- Composer: Masahiko Hagio
- Platform: PlayStation 2
- Release: JP: April 25, 2002; NA: February 4, 2003; EU: March 28, 2003
- Genre: Survival horror
- Mode: Single-player

Galerians: Ash (ガレリアンズ：アッシュ, Garerianzu: Asshu) is a survival horror video game developed by Polygon Magic for the Sony PlayStation 2. Galerians: Ash is the sequel to Galerians, a PlayStation game. It is a psychic action game with a dark setting. It follows the story of a young man named Rion who has psychic powers and the resilience to overcome the Last Galerians, a genetically engineered group of superhumans whose purpose is to wipe out humankind.

== Story ==
The plot of Galerians: Ash is highly dependent upon its predecessor, Galerians, and begins with a synopsis of the events from that game. In the 26th century, two computer scientists develop an advanced self-replicating artificial intelligence, whom they called Dorothy. Dorothy grew in scope and influence quickly, and began to question why she should obey humans, whom she identified as inferior. Her creators told her of the existence of God, and that just as humankind must abide by the will of God, so must Dorothy obey her creators - humans. While Dorothy seemed to accept this explanation, she secretly began developing Galerians - a superior human race with psychic powers, for whom she would be God.

Dorothy's creators put a safeguard against her - two programs that, if introduced into Dorothy's systems, would destroy her - into the minds of their two children, Rion Steiner and Lilia Pascalle. Though Rion was captured by Dorothy's followers and experimented upon, he managed to break free using the psychic powers he gained from the experiments. Going through a series of painful ordeals, Rion found Lilia and killed the Galerians, but not without discovering that he himself was a Galerian, and that the real Rion died while being subjected to the experiments. In the end Rion and Lilia destroyed Dorothy, but the mental stress of the battle destroyed Rion's brain.

Galerians: Ash takes place six years after the original Galerians. Though Dorothy was destroyed, she produced several more Galerians - the Last Galerians - in her final moments, and mankind has fought a desperate battle with them ever since. The game begins with Lilia, now a computer scientist herself, locating backup data of Rion's personality in the remains of Dorothy's systems, and using them to bring Rion back to life. Lilia realizes that only Rion has the power to stop the leader of the Last Galerians, known as Ash, and end the nightmare once and for all.

== Reception ==
Reception

Aggregate score
Aggregator	Score
Metacritic	50/100

Review scores
Publication	Score
Electronic Gaming Monthly	5.33/10
Eurogamer	3/10
Famitsu	27/40
Game Informer	8/10
GamePro	2.5/5
GameRevolution	D
GameSpot	5.5/10
GameSpy	2/5
GameZone	7.5/10
IGN	4.4/10
Official U.S. PlayStation Magazine	1.5/5

Galerians: Ash received "mixed" reviews according to the review aggregation website Metacritic. In Japan, Famitsu gave it a score of one six and three sevens for a total of 27 out of 40.
