= Shou Tajima =

Japanese manga illustrator

Shōu Tajima (田島 昭宇, Tajima Shōu, born February 7, 1966 in Saitama Prefecture, Japan) is a manga illustrator and anime character designer. He has done character designs for the anime Kai Doh Maru, Otogi Zoshi, the survival horror video game Galerians: Ash, and the CGI OVA Galerians: Rion, as well as Kill Bill Chapter 3: The Origin of O-Ren. He also provided character designs and artwork for the Final Fantasy VII novel The Kids Are Alright: A Turks Side Story, some of which later appeared in the video game Final Fantasy VII Remake.

== Manga works ==
- Madara (1987)
- Brothers (1990)
- Multiple Personality Detective Psycho (1997)
- Neo Devilman (1999)
- Robot: Super Color Comic (2004)

== External links/References ==
- Shou Tajima at Anime News Network's encyclopedia
- The Ultimate Manga Guide - Tajima Shouu
- Shou Tajima on Twitter
