= 1993–94 United States Senate hearings on video games =

US video game industry lawmaking

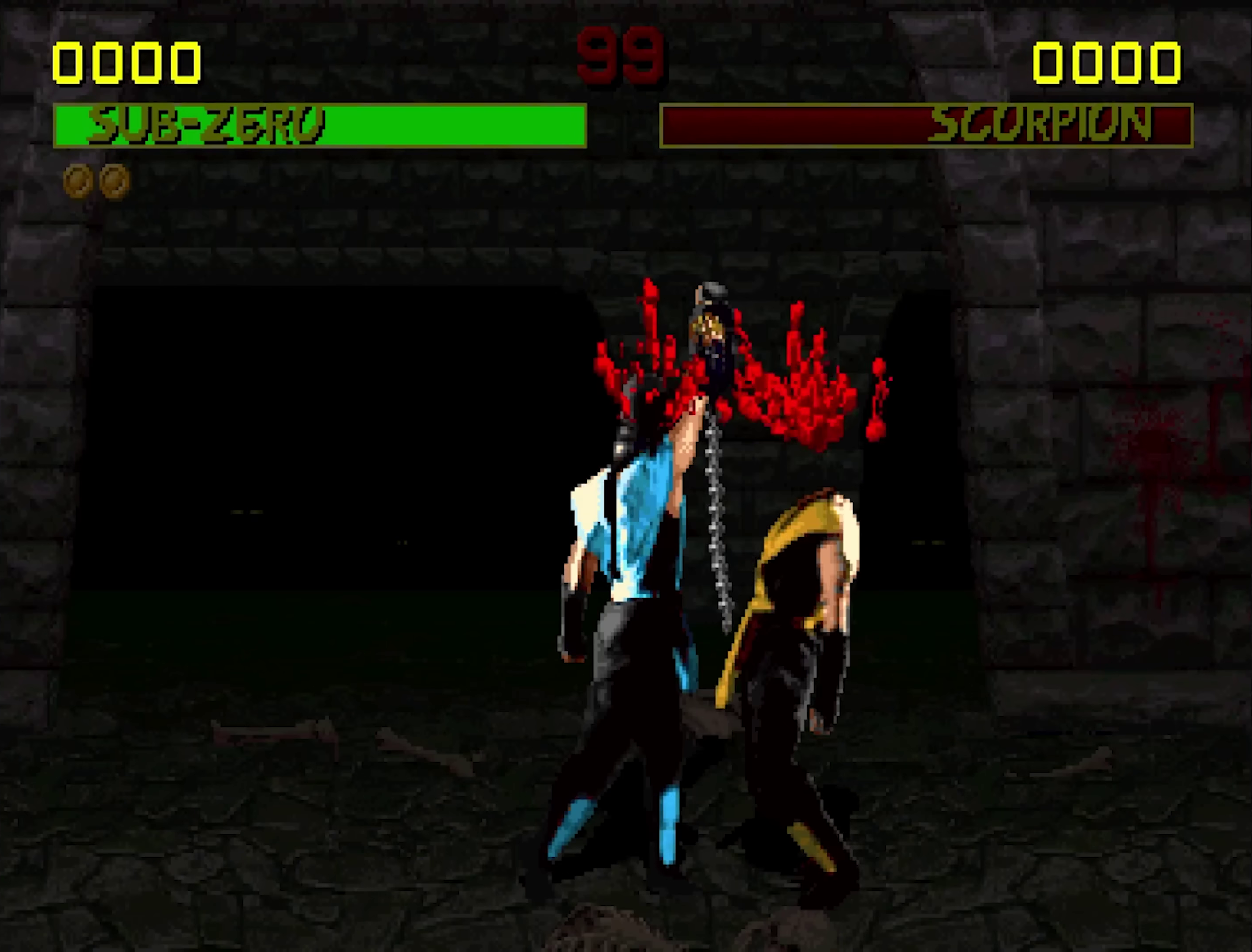
A fatality finishing move in the first Mortal Kombat (1992). The violence and gore associated with the move was one of the triggering factors into the U.S. Senate investigation into the lack of video game ratings.

On December 9, 1993, and March 4, 1994, members of the combined United States Senate Committees on Governmental Affairs and the Judiciary held congressional hearings with several spokespersons for companies in the video game industry including Nintendo and Sega, involving violence in video games and the perceived impacts on children. The hearing was a result of concerns raised by members of the public on the 1992 releases of Night Trap and Mortal Kombat, and later the 1993 release of Doom, which occurred just a day after the first hearing. Besides general concerns related to violence in video games, the situation had been inflamed by a moral panic over gun violence, as well as the state of the industry and an intense rivalry between Sega and Nintendo.

The hearings, led by Senators Joe Lieberman and Herb Kohl, put the video game companies to task for the realistic depiction of violence in video games, and threatened that Congress would take action to regulate the industry if they did not take steps themselves. As a result, the American video game industry created the Interactive Digital Software Association (now known as the Entertainment Software Association) in July 1994 to serve as an advocacy group for the industry, and subsequently formed the Entertainment Software Ratings Board (ESRB) to provide content ratings on video games sold at retail in North America.

== Background ==
Since as early as the 1970s, video games have been criticized for having violent content that psychologically influence players. In 1982, the Surgeon General C. Everett Koop asserted that video games may be affecting the health and well-being of young people and were potentially addictive. However, until the 1990s, the perceived target market for video games was generally for children, and manufacturers of video games typically did not include high levels of graphic violence in their games. Most computer game software would be sold through toy stores like Toys 'R' Us or general retail outlets like Sears and Wal-Mart, rather than computer stores.

=== State of the industry ===
By 1993, the video game industry had recovered from the 1983 crash, and was estimated to be worth US$6 billion. Video game consoles had reached the 16-bit era with the ability to support higher resolution graphics. Alongside this, video games had started to draw older players, creating a market for games with more mature content, both on home consoles and in arcades.

During this period, two key players were Nintendo and Sega. Nintendo had been instrumental in helping to recover the North American market after the crash with the introduction of the Nintendo Entertainment System (NES); in 1990, Nintendo sales accounted for 90% of the US$3 billion US market. Its successor system, the Super Nintendo Entertainment System (SNES), was released in 1991. However, to avoid repeating one of the issues that caused the crash, Nintendo took care to limit and review what third-party games could be made for its platforms to avoid a glut of poor games. Sega, which had already released its Sega Genesis in the US in 1989, found their sales to be lagging behind Nintendo. In an aggressive campaign aimed at the United States market, Sega heavily pushed the game Sonic the Hedgehog, with its titular character aimed to become Sega's mascot and rival that of Nintendo's Mario. Sega was also less selective about which games it allowed on the platform, allowing many more third-party games onto the system to increase its library in contrast to Nintendo's. Further, Sega used marketing language purposely aimed at Nintendo, such as "Sega does what Nintendon't". By 1992, Sega had obtained 65% of the US gaming market, overtaking Nintendo's dominant position. Subsequently, a strong rivalry between Nintendo and Sega was formed, referred as the "Console Wars", which continued through the next decade and into the sixth generation of video game consoles, after which Sega dropped out of the hardware market and became principally a game developer and publisher, and at times working collaboratively with Nintendo.

=== Existing content ratings system ===
Prior to 1994, the video game industry did not have a unified content rating system. Entering 1993, the Children's Advertising Review Unit (CARU) of the Better Business Bureau had heard rumblings from politicians that the content of video games was under scrutiny, and sent word to its board members, Sega and Nintendo. Sega agreed that they should have a ratings system, and had developed its Videogame Rating Council in June 1993 in association with independent educators, psychologists, child development experts and sociologists. The Videogames Rating Council had three principal ratings for games released on the Genesis platform: GA for General Audiences, MA-13 for games intended for those thirteen years and older, and MA-17 for those 17 years and older. Sega debuted their system in June 1993 just prior to the release of Mortal Kombat for the Genesis, knowing the ratings system would help mitigate concerns over the violent content in the game. Nintendo did not have a ratings system, but as it had control over the cartridge manufacturing process, it would only publish games they felt appropriate for a family console. Nintendo also refused to use Sega's ratings solution due to their continued corporate rivalry.

A further difficulty for the industry was that there was no established trade group for the video game industry. While many of the game publishers belonged to the Software Publishers Association, this group represented more practical software interests, such as word processors and spreadsheets, and the Association did not hold the entertainment software membership in high regard.

=== Mortal Kombat ===
Fighting games had become a lucrative property after the release of Capcom's arcade Street Fighter II: The World Warrior in 1991, which established many conventions of the genre. While Sega lured many of Nintendo's third-party developers to break their exclusivity agreements to publish games only for the Nintendo consoles, Capcom remained loyal to Nintendo, licensing only a few titles to Sega to publish, and only the SNES received the home console port of Street Fighter II in 1992, which was said to help keep the SNES sales ahead of the Genesis in the United States for that year.

Numerous other fighting games followed to try to capture on Street Fighter II's success, but most notably was Midway's Mortal Kombat, first released as an arcade game in 1992. Mortal Kombat was highly controversial at its release. Unlike Street Fighter II, which used traditional handmade sprites that resembled cartoon or comic book illustrations, Mortal Kombat used digital scans of live actors, with graphic depictions of blood and gore (notably the infamous Fatality finishing moves) that were largely absent from other fighting games at the time. Despite the game's advertising indicating the game was meant for mature audiences, the perception that video games were still aimed at children caused parents and other concerned groups to criticize the violence within the game. However, at this point, Mortal Kombat was only an arcade game, making it relatively easy to segregate it from other arcade games if necessary. Greg Fischbach, the co-founder and CEO of Acclaim Entertainment, the company that had secured the license for home console versions of the game, said that while the negative press attention helped to boost the game's popularity, "[w]e didn't want that press or publicity", and recognized that the industry might need to take steps to quell similar problems in the future.

Because of its success in the arcade, Acclaim Entertainment started to bring Mortal Kombat to various home consoles. Both Sega and Nintendo sought the game for their consoles, the Genesis and the SNES, respectively. Both companies recognized the issue with the level of gore in the game, but took very different approaches. Sega, staying with their attempt to capture as much of the market, went with trying to keep as much of the visual gore from the arcade game in place. While the Genesis version of Mortal Kombat as shipped eliminated the blood and fatalities, they could be activated via the use of a well-published cheat code. As the game, as shipped, did not include the blood and gore, Sega labelled it with their MA-13 VRC label. On the other hand, Nintendo wanted to keep games on their system appropriate for families and children, and required Acclaim to change the red blood to grey sweat, edit the fatalities, and change other parts of the game's artwork to remove elements like severed heads on spikes. Sega's version of Mortal Kombat outsold Nintendo's by a factor of five. This furthered the existing rivalry between the two companies.

=== Night Trap ===
Night Trap is a 1992 game developed by Digital Pictures and released on the Sega CD, a CD-ROM attachment for the Sega Genesis. Night Trap is presented as an interactive movie, using full-motion video to show scenes and allowing players to choose their next option, creating divergence in the story. The game's narration centered on the disappearance of teenage girls (starring Dana Plato) at a winery estate, tied in with the appearance of vampire-like beings that feed on young females.

Night Trap drew criticism worldwide, which helped to publicize it. Similar issues were brought up in the United Kingdom, with former Sega of Europe development director Mike Brogan noting that "Night Trap got Sega an awful lot of publicity... Questions were even raised in the UK Parliament about its suitability. This came at a time when Sega was capitalizing on its image as an edgy company with attitude, and this only served to reinforce that image." However, in retrospective, much of this criticism was deemed misguided. Steven L. Kent writes that "Reading the transcripts of the 1993 hearings, it is hard to believe that anybody had ever actually played Night Trap. Few people bothered to acknowledge that the goal of Night Trap was not to kill women but to save them from vampires. Players did not even kill the vampires—they simply trapped them in Rube Goldberg–like booby traps. Nearly everyone who referred to Night Trap mentioned a scene in which a girl in a rather modest teddy is caught by the vampires and killed. The scene was meant to show players that they had lost and allowed too many vampires into the house." Jeremy Parish of 1UP.com noted that "its game objectives were mischaracterized either through ignorance or deliberate obfuscation, transforming it from bland and barely titillating FMV adventure to child-corrupting sexual boogeyman." In Sex in Video Games, Brenda Brathwaite describes the game as "rather campy" and its sexual content as "minimal and largely limited to the dress of the women", also pointing out how many critics claimed the game was about killing the female characters, rather than helping protect them.

=== Lethal Enforcers ===
Lethal Enforcers was a 1992 arcade game released in 1992 by Konami which used light guns; the player takes the role of a police officer to lethally take down criminals while avoiding killing civilians and fellow police officers or being shot by criminals. The game was rendered using photo-realistic imagery which drew some concern. It was ported to home consoles the next year (on Sega systems in late 1993, and on the SNES by early 1994). These games shipped with the Konami Justifier, a plastic light gun modeled after a revolver.

=== Moral panic around gun violence ===
In the months prior to the hearings, there had been a small moral panic in America on gun-related crimes, which fueled the concerns related to violent video games. According to the Bureau of Justice Statistics, gun-related homicides had reached record highs in 1993 since the 1970s. Both Congress and the Justice Department were looking to reduce the amount of violence on television.

=== Congressional concern ===
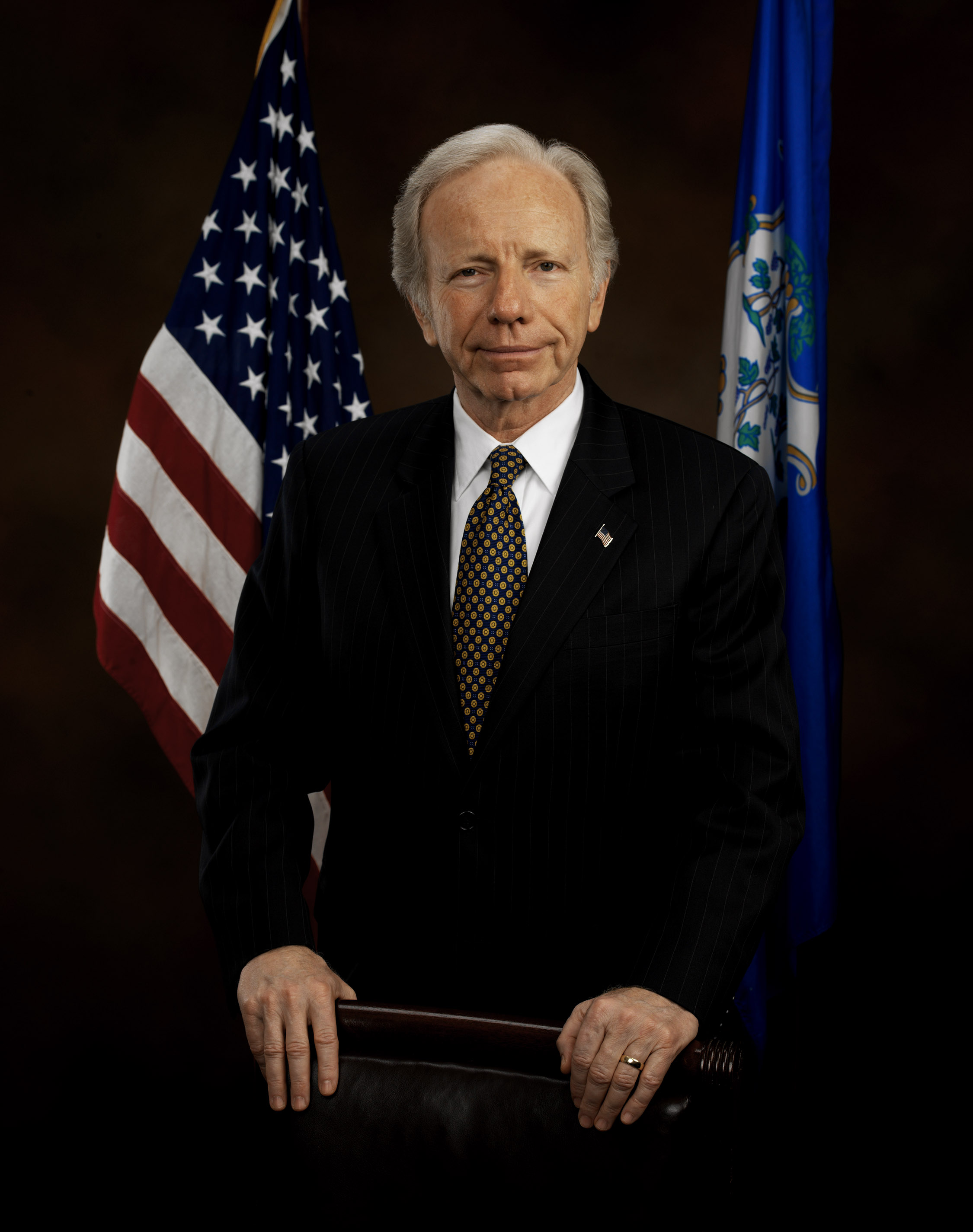
Senator Joe Lieberman, who was at the center of the video game violence hearings

The violence in video games became a concern after Mortal Kombat's home console release in September 13, 1993. One of Senator Joe Lieberman's former chief of staff, Bill Andresen, had been asked by his son to purchase the Sega version of Mortal Kombat for him. Andresen was appalled by the amount of violence in the game, and approached Lieberman on the matter. Lieberman was also shocked by the content of the game and began gathering more information. Lieberman had stated he had heard about Night Trap, evaluated the game himself, and also recognized its content as problematic.

By December 1, 1993, Lieberman held a press conference alongside other children's advocates including Bob Keeshan, the actor of "Captain Kangaroo". Lieberman stated his intention to open a congressional hearing the following week to address the issue of violent video games and the lack of content ratings, and his plans to introduce a ratings body through legislation to regulate the video game industry. During the conference, he showed footage from Mortal Kombat, Night Trap, and other games. Lieberman's research concluded that the average video game player at the time was between seven and twelve years old, and that video game publishers were marketing violence to children. Lieberman commented on the sales of Mortal Kombat to date, having sold 3 million copies by that point and was estimated to bring in over US$100 million by the end of the year, demonstrating the greed of the industry to use violence to cater to children. Of Night Trap, Lieberman said "I looked at that game, too, and there was a classic. It ends with this attack scene on this woman in lingerie, in her bathroom. I know that the creator of the game said it was all meant to be a satire of Dracula; but nonetheless, I thought it sent out the wrong message." Lieberman stated "Few parents would buy these games for their kids if they knew what was in them" and "We're talking about video games that glorify violence and teach children to enjoy inflicting the most gruesome forms of cruelty imaginable." Lieberman subsequently stated that while he'd "like to ban all the violent video games", he knew this would conflict with the First Amendment, and instead wanted to seek a solution involving a content ratings system, which he felt would not impede First Amendment rights.

== Hearings ==
=== First hearing ===
External videos
- C-SPAN footage of the first hearing on December 9, 1993.

The first hearing was held on December 9, 1993, in front of the combined Governmental Affairs and Judiciary Senate committees. At the time, the Senate was in recess, so the only senators present were Lieberman, Kohl and Byron Dorgan.

Hours before the hearing, representatives of the video game industry announced that they have agreed to endorse and develop an industry-standard video game content ratings system, as an attempt to defuse the bad publicity of the hearings. This announcement was referred to several times throughout the first hearing.

Speaking witnesses to the panel included:

- Dr. Parker Page of the Children's Television Resource and Education Center
- Professor Eugene F. Provenzo of the University of Miami and author of the recently published Video Kids: Making Sense of Nintendo (1991)
- Robert Chase of National Education Association
- Marilyn Droz of the National Coalition on Television Violence
- Howard Lincoln, vice president of Nintendo of America
- Bill White, vice president of Sega of America
- Ilene Rosenthal, General Counsel, Software Publishers Association
- Dawn Weiner, Video Software Dealers Association
- Craig Johnson, Past-President, Amusement and Music Operators Association

The first half of the hearing was devoted to the experts on education and child psychology. These four discussed their concerns and findings on the impact of violence in video games on children. Chase stated "Electronic games, because they are active rather than passive, can do more than desensitize impressionable children to violence. They actually encourage violence as the resolution of first resort by rewarding participants for killing one's opponents in the most grisly ways imaginable." Provenzo iterated his findings in writing Video Kids, stated that recent games had become "overwhelmingly violent, sexist, and racist", and affirmed that he felt that with games like Night Trap, the industry was "endorsing violence" and further called for a ratings system. Droz stated that children "need action, but they do not need to find murder as a form of entertainment".

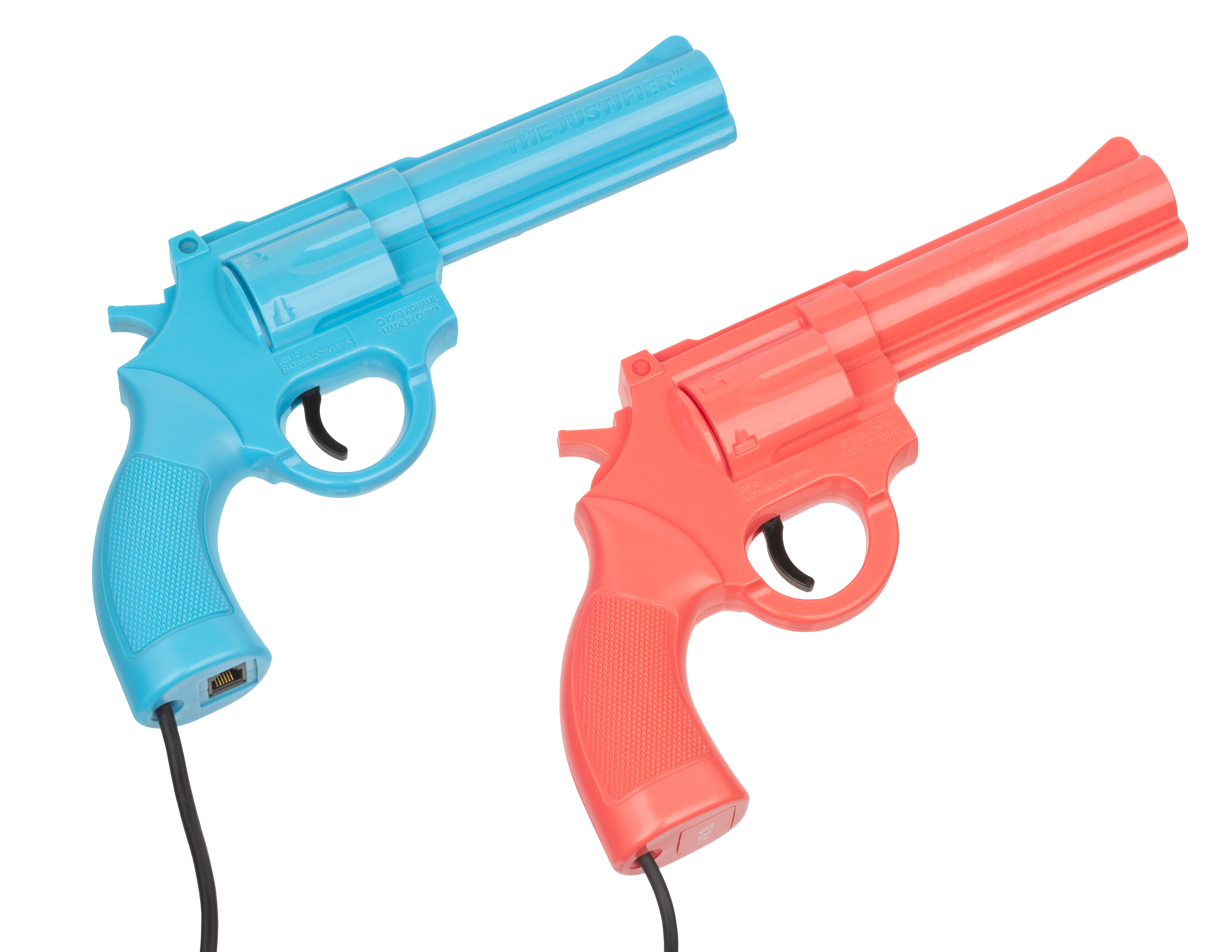
The Konami Justifier shipped with home console versions of Lethal Enforcers. These guns were modeled after real-life revolvers and raised concerns with the panel.

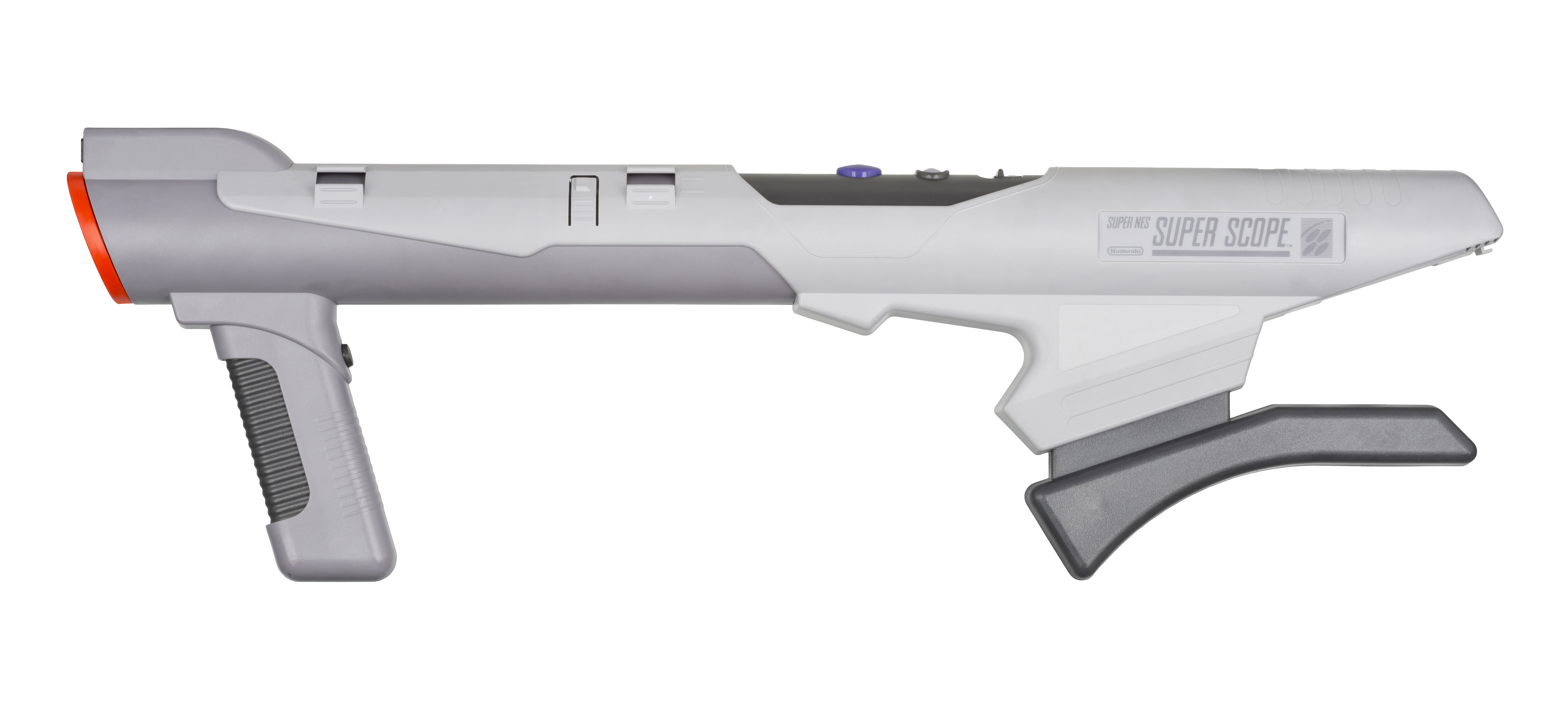
The Nintendo Super Scope for the SNES, shaped like a bazooka

The second half of the hearing focused on the industry representatives. During the hearing, both Sega and Nintendo continued their ongoing rivalry, accusing the other of the reason behind the hearings. Nintendo's Lincoln had led off his part of the testimony by acknowledging Nintendo's action to remove some of the violence of Mortal Kombat, which observers found gave Lincoln more respect from Lieberman than Sega's White received. One of White's key points was the transformation of the video game industry from primarily having a younger audience to an adult, and that Night Trap was meant only for adults. Lincoln rebuffed these claims, telling White, "I can't just sit here and allow you to be told that the video game industry has been transformed from children [as primary consumers] to adults." White referred to statistics collected from warranty cards on hardware and game sales that Sega kept and Nintendo would have also kept to justify the older demographics of current video games. Further, Lincoln asserted that Sega only developed its rating system after the release of Night Trap and only started to label its games after the game was criticized by consumers. White responded by showing a videotape of violent video games on the SNES and stressed the importance of rating video games, which at this point, Nintendo lacked.

Of Lethal Enforcers, Lieberman criticized the design of the Konami Enforcer to resemble a revolver; an infamous still of C-SPAN's coverage of the hearings was Lieberman holding up the Enforcer to talk about its realistic nature. Sega's White countered that Nintendo had a similar light gun product on the market, the Super Scope, that was shaped after a bazooka. Lieberman asserted that both the Enforcer and Super Scope looked too much like real weapons and should not be in the hands of children.

Lieberman was also critical of how the video game industry company approached advertising. During the hearing it showcased a Sega television advertisement where a school-aged child wins several video games over others, and then makes the other students obey his commands. Lieberman also expressed concern on Sega's Videogame Ratings Council, that while the ratings were reasonable, there was no standardization of how they were displayed, sometimes only printed on the game cartridge itself, and thus preventing parents from being able to review these before purchase.

Kohl warned the video game publishers that "If you don't do something about [content ratings], we will." This statement was a reference to a bill that Lieberman had been drafting where the government would become involved in a ratings system. By the end of the hearing, Sega and Nintendo said they would commit themselves towards working with retail outlets including Sears and Toys 'R' Us to create a voluntary content ratings system to denote any violence or sexual content in their games, to be modeled after the film rating system created by the Motion Picture Association of America. At the conclusion of the first hearing, Lieberman decided they would have a second session in a few months to see on the progress of the industry on this effort.

=== Video Game Rating Act of 1994 ===
Following the December 1993 hearing, Senator Lieberman, co-sponsored by Kohl and Dorgan, introduced the Video Games Rating Act of 1994 (S.1823) on February 3, 1994 to the Senate; the equivalent bill (H.R.3785) was introduced to the House of Representatives by Tom Lantos. The Act, if passed, would have established an Interactive Entertainment Rating Commission, a five-member panel appointed by the President. This commission would then have coordinated with the video game industry to develop a ratings system and method of disseminating information related to violence and sexually explicit content to potential buyers. Lieberman asserted that the bill had been presented as to coerce the video game industry to take voluntary action themselves to come up with a ratings system, but that he had no plans to follow through on the bill should the industry come to an agreement.

=== Interim events ===
As a result of the Congressional hearings, Night Trap started to generate more sales. According to Digital Pictures founder Tom Zito, "You know, I sold 50,000 units of Night Trap a week after those hearings." Two weeks before Christmas 1993, Night Trap was removed from store shelves in the US's two largest toy store chains, Toys "R" Us and Kay-Bee Toys, after receiving numerous complaints. Michael Goldstein, the vice president of Toys 'R' Us, stated in mid-December that this was "a decision we made several weeks ago with the concurrence of Sega, which agrees with our decision". Sega withdrew Night Trap from all retail markets in January 1994, after selling over 250,000 copies. Bill White, Sega Vice President of Marketing, stated that Night Trap was pulled because the continued controversy surrounding it prevented constructive dialogue about an industry-wide rating system. Sega also stated at the time they would later release a censored version pending the establishment of an industry-wide ratings system.

=== Second hearing ===
External videos
- C-SPAN coverage of the second hearing on March 4, 1994.

The second hearing was held on March 4, 1994, which included as speakers:

- Congressman Tom Lantos
- Jack Heistand, Senior Vice President for Electronic Arts
- Mary Evan, Vice President of Store Operations, Babbages
- Chuck Kerby, Divisional Merchandise Manager, Wal-Mart
- Steve Loenigsberg, President, American Amusement Machine Association
- R.A. Green, III, Amusements & Music Operator Association

Heistand presented himself as part of the newly formed Interactive Entertainment Industry Rating Commission, the industry group working to establish the desired ratings systems. He reported to the joint committee that seven companies, including Electronic Arts, Sega, Nintendo, Atari, Acclaim, Philips and 3DO, representing about 60% of video game software in the United States, had committed to developing an industry software ratings board. Heistand said they anticipated to have come to agreements on the ratings standards by June 1994, such that by November of that year (in time for the holiday shopping season), they will be able to rate all new games coming to the market going forward, an estimated 2,500 games per year. However, Heistand also reported that the industry said there would too much effort to review all previously released games. Heistand also cautioned that the system may not take off if they could not get other software developers outside the group to also sign on to support the ratings system.

Lieberman acknowledged the proposed system as a critical step towards helping parents make informed decisions, but cautioned that until the rating system was in place, they would not be removing the proposed bill from their agenda. Retailers such as Wal-Mart, Toys "R" Us, and Babbages agreed that they would only stock games that have received these ratings, though had not yet decided on how to handle selling games rating for adults to children. The Senators still expressed concern at the type of content the industry was willing to produce. Kohl stated "Let me give you my honest perspective on this issue: Violent video games that degrade women are harmful to our children and are garbage...But we live by and cherish a Constitution that prevents government from censoring material. So we will try to live with a rating system". Lieberman stated that if "'the video game industry had practiced self-restraint before now, we wouldn't be here today".

== Reactions ==
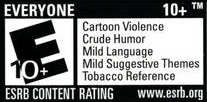
An example of an ESRB rating for a video game, a result of the hearings, which identify both the age category and content descriptors for the game

By April 1994, the coalition of companies represented by Heistand established the Interactive Digital Software Association (IDSA), with Acclaim's Fischbach serving as its initial CEO. One of the first tasks taken by the IDSA was to establish the promised rating system. While Sega offered their existing VRC as a basis, Nintendo, among others, steadfastly refused as they did not want to have to deal with anything created by their main competitor. Instead, a vendor-independent solution was developed, the Entertainment Software Rating Board (ESRB), with a new set of rating standards developed in conjunction with parents and educators. The ESRB ratings system was modeled after the Motion Picture Association of America, defining five age-related categories, but also adding a set of descriptive terms that would appear next to the rating to describe the specific content that would be found in the game.

The ESRB was formally introduced to Congress in July 1994 to show that they had met Lieberman's goal, and the Board became officially active on September 13, 1994. Lieberman stated in a 2017 interview that the video game industry "actually came up with a rating system that I think at the time — I honestly haven't been back to this in a long time — was the best. Much better than the movies." The IDSA also served to become the industry trade association to help advocate for the industry to the government and other groups. Eventually, IDSA was renamed to the Entertainment Software Association and launched the industry's principal trade show, the Electronic Entertainment Expo.

While The 3DO Company had stated they would help back an industry-wide solution to content ratings, they concurrently developed their own 3DO Rating System for games released on the 3DO platform. The 3DO system was voluntary and unlike the ESRB, allowed the publisher to select the rating. Publishers of 3DO games were split whether to use the ESRB or 3DO system. Ultimately, 3DO exited the hardware business around 1996, nullifying the need of the 3DO Rating System.

Separately, the Software Publishers Association (now the Software and Information Industry Association), the Association of Shareware Professionals, and other groups that represented developers of video game software on personal computers felt that the proposed ESRB system, which was based principally on age ratings, was not sufficient and wanted to inform parents to the specific types of content that would be in their games. These groups developed the Recreational Software Advisory Council (RSAC) in 1994 which rated games in three areas: violence, sexual content, and language, with each being rated among five levels. The following year, the RSAC system was also developed for Internet sites under the "RSACi" system. By 1999, RSAC and RSACi were transitioned to the Internet Content Rating Association dedicated specifically for rating Internet content, while software developers adopted the ESRB system for their games.

== Legacy ==
Senator Lieberman continued to monitor the video game industry following the hearings, a general part of his own position related to violent content from entertainment industries. In 1997, he stated that one of his intentions of the 1993 hearings was to have the industry regulate how much violence that the video game industry was putting into its games by having them implement the ratings system, but felt that "[t]he rating system has not stopped game producers from putting out some very violent games."

Mortal Kombat II was released to arcades in its final form by January 1994, and to home consoles later that year. Among other changes, the game added a variation on "Fatalities" called "Friendships", which would occur if the player performed a separate move mechanically similar to a fatality; in such a case, the winning fighter would do a non-hostile action, such as giving the defeated fighter a virtual present. According to John Tobias, co-creator of Mortal Kombat, these friendships were added due to response from the Congressional hearings. When the home console versions were released, after the establishment for the ESRB, Nintendo did not take issue with the amount of violence in the game, and allowed it to release without any changes on the SNES. The SNES version of Mortal Kombat II outsold the Sega Genesis version that year.

id Software's Doom, a first-person shooter where the player fought hellish creatures and included graphic violence, was released on December 10, 1993, the day following the first hearing. Outside of the hearings, there was concern by parents and other organizations on the violence in this game as well. While Doom was not mentioned in either Senate hearing, it would come up again in 1999 following the Columbine High School massacre, where the perpetrators had described their planned attack as something straight out of Doom. As a result, Doom is frequently classified along with Mortal Kombat, Night Trap, and Lethal Enforcers as early examples of violent video games highlighted by the media.

At the time of the hearings, video games were not established as a protected form of speech covered under the First Amendment to the United States Constitution, though Lieberman and others had stated their concerns about First Amendment rights through censoring violent games and sought the ratings approach. Since the formation of the ESRB, attempts have been made by lawmakers at federal and state levels to restrict video game sales by their ESRB rating, principally in regards to their level of violence. In a landmark case in 2011, the Supreme Court of the United States ruled in Brown v. Entertainment Merchants Association that video games are an art form, protected by the First Amendment. The ruling found that while states can pass laws to block the sale of "obscene" video games to minors, violence would not fall within the Miller test of what is considered obscene.

One of Howard Lincoln's statements during the first hearing was "Let me say for the record, I want to state that Night Trap will never appear on a Nintendo System." The statement was jokingly referred to in 2018 when a remake of Night Trap for its 25th anniversary was announced for release on the Nintendo Switch among other systems.
