= Lethal Enforcers II: Gun Fighters =

1994 video game

- Arcade flyer
- Developer: Konami
- Publisher: Konami
- Producer: Tom. K.
- Composers: Tsuyoshi Sekito; Yuichi Sakakura
- Series: Lethal Enforcers
- Platforms: Arcade, Sega Genesis, Sega CD, PlayStation (as Lethal Enforcers I & II)
- Release: March 1994: Arcade; JP: March 1994; NA: April 1994; EU: 1994 Genesis; NA: October 1994; PAL: December 1994 Sega CD; NA: November 24, 1994; JP: November 25, 1994; PAL: December 1994 PlayStation; NA: November 17, 1997; JP: November 20, 1997; PAL: November 1997
- Genres: Light gun shooter, rail shooter
- Modes: Single-player, multiplayer
- Arcade system: Konami GX

Lethal Enforcers II: Gun Fighters, known in Japan as Lethal Enforcers 2: The Western, (Note: Japanese: リーサルエンフォーサーズ２, Hepburn: Rīsaru Enfōsāzu Tsu) is a 1994 light gun shooter video game developed and published by Konami for arcades. It is a prequel to the original Lethal Enforcers (1992); in contrast with the first game's modern law enforcement theme, Lethal Enforcers II takes place in the American Old West.

Ports of the game were released for the Sega Genesis and Sega CD. The game was bundled along with the first Lethal Enforcers game as part of the PlayStation compilation Lethal Enforcers I & II. A Super NES version of the game was also announced that same year, but was unreleased. Years later, Konami released Lethal Enforcers 3.

== Gameplay ==
In this game, the goal is to shoot outlaws in order to eradicate crime from a stereotypical town in the American West of 1873. At the beginning of the game, three to five life units are available. In the arcade version, more can be purchased by inserting additional coins. Life units are also awarded based on how many points the player scores while playing the game. Every time the player, an innocent townsfolk or lawman is shot, one life unit will be lost. The game ends when all life units are gone, but continued play is available.

Lethal Enforcers 2 has seven stages (including two bonus stages): "The Bank Robbery", "The Stage Holdup", "Saloon Showdown", "The Train Robbery", and "The Hide-Out". During each stage, the player must shoot the armed outlaws without harming any innocent townsfolk or fellow lawmen. One shot is enough to kill most enemies. Each stage features a boss that must be killed in order to complete the stage (though a unique case happened in the third stage where the boss battle is in the form of a dueling mini-game). Just like the original game, a dip switch setting in the arcade version allows operators to let players progress through the stages in a linear fashion ("arcade mode") or select individual stages ("street mode"), including the between level target practice stages.

=== Weapons ===
Like with the previous game, the player begins with a revolver that can hold six rounds. To reload, the player must aim the light gun away from the screen and pull the trigger. Additional weaponry can be found throughout the game that will give the player better firepower: .50 caliber Sharps rifles, higher-capacity rifles, double rigs, shotguns, Gatling guns, and cannons. The Gatling guns and cannons can each be used only once but the other four weapons can be reloaded the same way as the revolver. If a player is shot while holding a more powerful weapon, it is lost and the player reverts to the original revolver.

=== Ranks ===
There are different ranks that the player can attain based on performance. The ranks are Posse, Deputy, Sheriff, Deputy Marshal, Marshal, and U.S. Marshal. When the game begins, the player's rank is Posse, and after each stage the player will be promoted, provided they have not killed any innocents. Killing innocents will cause the player to either be demoted or stay the same rank, although the ranks do not go below Posse. On Sega Genesis and Sega CD port, the accuracy for each stage corresponds to the given rank:

- 59% or below: Posse
- 60-69%: Deputy
- 70-79%: Sheriff
- 80-89%: Deputy Marshal
- 90% or above: U.S. Marshal

== Reception ==
Reception

Review scores
Publication	Score
AllGame	3.5/5 (Genesis); 3.5/5 (Arcade)
Computer and Video Games	82% (Arcade)
Electronic Gaming Monthly	31/50 (Genesis); 33/50 (Sega CD)
GamePro	5/5 (Genesis); 5/5 (Sega CD)
Next Generation	3/5 (Sega CD)

In North America, RePlay reported Lethal Enforcers II: Gun Fighters to be the fourth most popular upright arcade game of May 1994, and Play Meter listed it as the ninth most popular arcade game of June 1994. In Japan, Game Machine listed it as the seventh most successful upright/cockpit arcade unit of November 1994.

GamePro gave the Genesis version a perfect 5 out of 5 in all four categories (graphics, sound, control, and fun factor), citing the variety of weapons and their individually distinct firing patterns, sharp digitized sprites, realistic backgrounds, and the quality build and accuracy of the Justifier peripheral, which they felt worked better with Lethal Enforcers II than with the original game. Electronic Gaming Monthly rated the Genesis version 31 out of 50, commenting positively on the two-player mode and variety of weapons.

GamePro gave the Sega CD version a positive review as well, saying that it is generally identical to the Genesis version but has more voices. Electronic Gaming Monthly rated it 33 out of 50, commenting that it has better music and sound effects than the Genesis version, but that the game is far more difficult than the first Lethal Enforcers. Next Generation rated it three stars out of five. The magazine criticized the graphics and noted that the game is more challenging than its predecessor.
