= Polygon Magic =

Japanese video game developer

Polygon Magic, Inc.
- Native name: ポリゴンマジック株式会社
- Romanized name: Porigon Majikku Kabushiki-gaisha
- Type: Privately held company
- Industry: Video games Information technology Internet
- Founded: 3 April 1996; 30 years ago
- Headquarters: Roppongi, Minato, Tokyo, Japan
- Key people: Takechika Tsurutani (CEO)
- Products: Video games Social networking service
- Number of employees: 211 (02/2026)
- Parent: Future Institute Corporation
- Divisions: Witch Trap Inc.
- Website: www.polygonmagic.com

Polygon Magic, Inc. (ポリゴンマジック株式会社, Porigon Majikku Kabushiki-Gaisha) is a Japanese video game developer. The company develops games for various platforms including arcade, Nintendo Wii, Nintendo DS, Nintendo 3DS, Facebook, Japanese SNS such as GREE and mobage, and pachinko. The studio is best known for Incredible Crisis and the Galerians series. The company has been a top developer and publisher in the field of Japanese mobile social games. Polygon Magic has been helping GREE to develop their first party titles. The company has its own social game platform, Porimaji Games.

== Games developed ==
=== Arcade ===
- Fighter's Impact (1996)
- Incredible Crisis (1999)
- Dragon Chronicle (2003)
- Wangan Midnight Maximum Tune (2004)
- Lethal Enforcers 3 (2004)
- Wangan Midnight Maximum Tune 2 (2005)
- Thrill Drive 3 (2005)
- OutRun 2 SP SDX (2006)
- Mobile Suit Gundam: Spirits of Zeon - Shura no So Hoshi (2006)
- Silent Hill: The Arcade (2007)
- Mobile Suit Gundam: Spirits of Zeon - Senshi no Kioku (2007)
- Akumajo Dracula: The Arcade (2009)

=== PlayStation ===
- Vs. (1997)
- Incredible Crisis (1999)
- Galerians (1999)
- ShaoLin (1999)
- Slap Happy Rhythm Busters (2000)
- Matsumoto Leiji 999 ~Story of Galaxy Express 999~ (2001)

=== PlayStation 2 ===
- Adventure of Tokyo Disney Sea: Ushinawareta Hoseki no Himitsu (2001)
- Galerians: Ash (2002)
- Street Golfer (2002)
- Inaka Kurashi: Nan no Shima no Monogatari (2002)
- Seven Samurai 20XX (2004)

=== Xbox ===
- Tecmo Classic Arcade (2005)

=== Game Boy Color ===
- Nintama Rantarou: Ninjutsu Gakuen ni Nyuugaku Shiyou no Dan (2001)

=== GameCube ===
- Disney Sports Basketball (2002)
- Bleach GC: Tasogare ni Mamieru Shinigami (2005)

=== Nintendo DS ===
- Tenchu: Dark Secret (2006)
- Tecmo Bowl: Kickoff (2008)
- Koshonin DS (2009)

=== Wii ===
- Bleach: Shattered Blade (2006)
- Ghost Squad (2007)
- We Fish (2009)

=== Mobage ===
- Derby x Derby (2010)
- Kabu x Kuwa Battle Masters (2010)

=== GREE ===
- Tsuri Sta (2008）Published by GREE
- Corde Mania (2010）Published by Sumzup
- Sengoku Kingdom (2011）Published by GREE

=== Facebook ===
- Nijiiro Dobutsuen / Rainbow Zoo (2010)

=== Own SNS platform ===
- Porimaji Games / Polygon Magic Games (2010)
