= Lethal Enforcers =

1992 video game

- North American arcade flyer
- Developer: Konami
- Publisher: Konami
- Director: Yoshiaki Hatano
- Designer: Yoshiaki Hatano
- Programmers: Yoshiaki Hatano; Hiroshi Matsuura; H. Ueno
- Artists: Steve Johnson; Jun Narita; D. Marshall; K. Hale
- Composer: Kenichiro Fukui
- Series: Lethal Enforcers
- Platforms: Arcade, Genesis/Mega Drive, Sega CD, Super NES, PlayStation (as Lethal Enforcers I & II)
- Release: September 1992: Arcade; NA: September 1992; JP: October 8, 1992; PAL: October 14, 1992 Genesis/Mega Drive; NA: 1993; JP: December 10, 1993; PAL: February 1994 Sega CD; JP: October 29, 1993; NA: November 1993; PAL: December 1993 Super NES; NA: January 1994; JP: March 11, 1994; PAL: 1994 PlayStation; NA: November 17, 1997; JP: November 20, 1997; PAL: November 1997
- Genre: Light gun shooter
- Modes: Single-player, multiplayer

Lethal Enforcers (Note: Japanese: リーサルエンフォーサーズ) is a 1992 light gun shooter video game developed and published by Konami for arcades. The graphics consist entirely of digitized photographs and digitized sprites. Home console versions were released for the Super NES, Sega Genesis, and Sega CD, and include a revolver-shaped light gun known as the Justifier.

The game was a critical and commercial success, becoming one of the top five highest-grossing dedicated arcade games of 1993 in the United States. However, it also caused controversy as it allowed players to shoot photorealistic representations of enemies. Lethal Enforcers was followed by Lethal Enforcers II: Gun Fighters. Both games would later be released in the two-in-one compilation Lethal Enforcers I & II (Lethal Enforcers Deluxe Pack in Japan) for the PlayStation. Years later, Konami released the Police 911 series as a Japan-themed sequel to the original plot. This was also followed by the arcade game Heroes of Justice, which was localized and renamed as Lethal Enforcers 3 for Western audiences.

== Plot ==
The player assumes control of a Chicago Police Department (CPD) officer named Don Marshall in Chicago, Illinois, who is at a donut shop for a break. While sipping the last drop of coffee, he gets a call from his dispatcher. They realize that a major crime organization has invaded town, and they need his help on the double. He is one of the two survivors of the elite group of officers. The rest have ended up in the hospital or killed. Once the call ended, he decided to check out the bank. From that point on, he is going to experience the toughest job that he would have during his years in the police force. He has been assigned and agrees to help stop a growing crime wave that puts the city's security in serious jeopardy, along with a helper (a second player can join in).

== Gameplay ==
The game is viewed from a first-person perspective. Initially armed with a standard-issue .38 service revolver, the player can acquire upgraded weapons during the course of play: a .357 Magnum, a semi-automatic pistol, a combat shotgun, an assault rifle, a submachine gun, or a grenade launcher. The submachine gun and grenade launcher can only be used once while other weapons can be reloaded like the service revolver. Losing a life reverts the player's weapon to the revolver. The game ends when all lives are lost, unless the player chooses to continue. Along the way, extra lives can be earned per 2,000 points (1,000 in console ports) scored. There are bonus points (10 each) for destroying certain targets. 8 points per enemy shot.

Lethal Enforcers has six stages (including the Training Stage): "The Bank Robbery", "Chinatown (on SNES, Downtown) Assault", "The Hijacking", "The Drug Dealers (on SNES, Gunrunners)", and "Chemical Plant Sabotage". During each stage, the player must shoot the armed robbers without harming any civilians or fellow policemen. One shot is enough to kill most enemies. At the end of each stage, a boss must be killed in order to complete the stage. A dip switch setting in the arcade version allows operators to let players progress through the stages in a linear fashion ("arcade mode") or select individual stages ("street mode").

Enemies always wear sunglasses, ski masks or gas masks, while fellow police officers and civilians are always barefaced. The boss character sometimes will have his face exposed; this battle is fought where there are no civilians present.

=== Weapons ===
The player begins with a revolver that can hold six rounds. To reload, the player must aim the light gun away from the screen and pull the trigger. Additional weaponry can be found throughout the game that will give the player better firepower: Magnum revolvers, assault rifles, semi-automatic pistols, shotguns, machine guns, and grenade launchers. The machine guns and grenade launchers can each be used only once but the other four weapons can be reloaded the same way as the revolver. If a player is shot while holding a more powerful weapon, it is lost and the player reverts to the original revolver.

=== Ranks ===
There are different ranks that the player can attain based on performance. The ranks are Patrolman, Detective, Sergeant, Lieutenant, Captain, and Commander. When the game begins, the player's rank is Patrolman, and after each stage the player is promoted, provided they have not killed any civilians. Killing civilians will cause the player to either be demoted or stay the same rank, although the ranks do not go below Patrolman.

== Ports ==
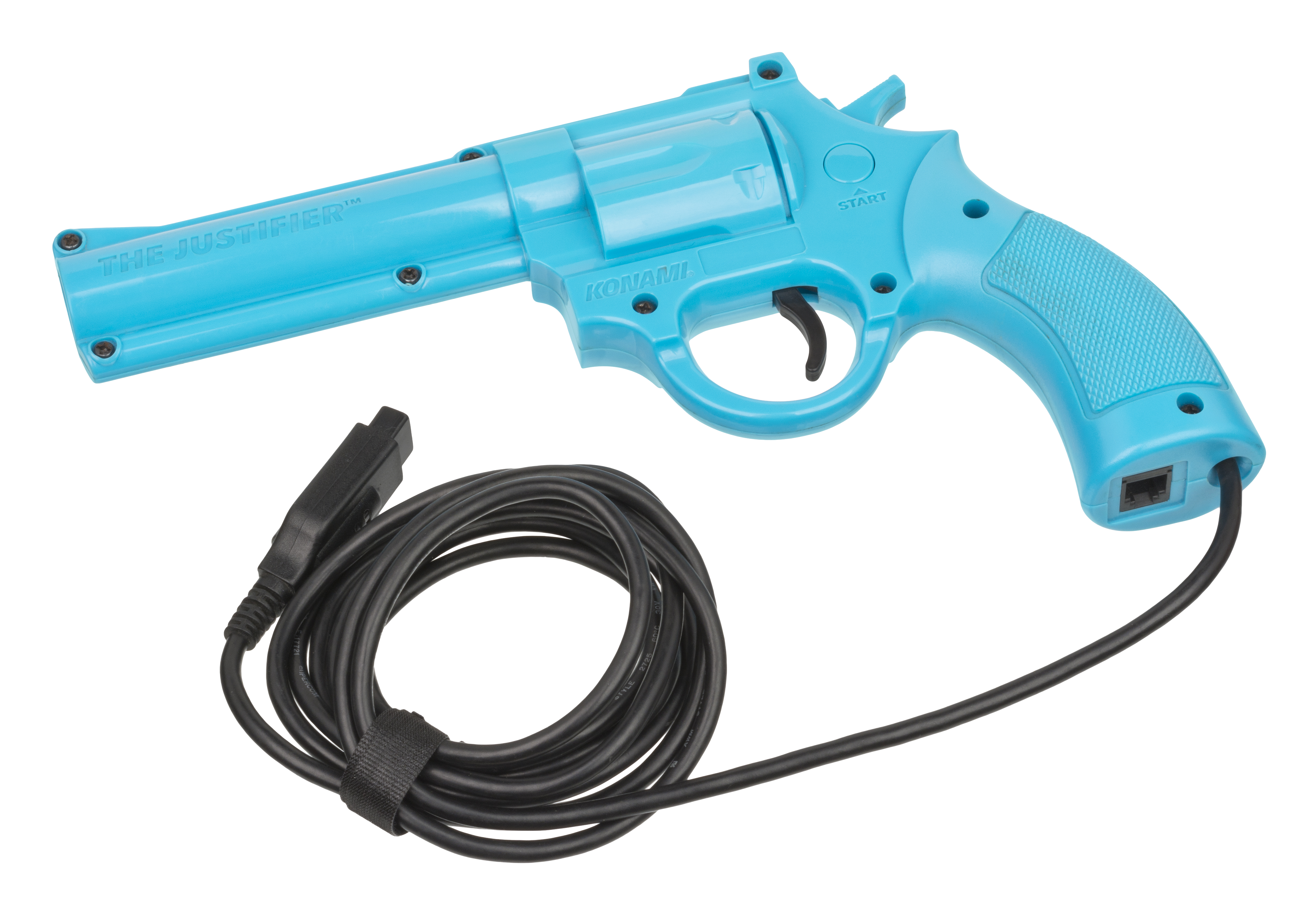
The Konami Justifier came packaged with home console ports.

Home console versions were released for the Super NES, Sega Genesis, and Sega CD. The home console versions make use of the Konami Justifier, a revolver-shaped light gun which came packaged with the game. A standard controller can be also used in lieu of the light gun in these versions. A second-player Justifier light gun, pink in color, was available only by mail order from Konami. The CD version features higher quality CD-DA music, sampled from the arcade original. The game is also featured alongside Lethal Enforcers II in the two-in-one compilation titled Lethal Enforcers I & II (Lethal Enforcers Deluxe Pack in Japan), developed by Konami Chicago and released for the PlayStation in 1997. A Sega Saturn version of the compilation was also announced but cancelled.

The Super NES version features traditional Nintendo censorship; no blood is shown when a player or criminal dies. Instead, the screen will flash light green or light blue to indicate that a player lost a life. Also, "Chinatown Assault" (which is basically a gang fight) is renamed "Downtown Assault" and "Drug Dealer" is renamed "Gunrunners".

== Regional differences ==
The Japanese arcade version of Lethal Enforcers contain several differences from the US and European arcade versions. These differences include the "how to reload" animation (the US and European versions show a woman shooting outside of the cabinet's screen to reload in-game, while the Japanese version shows the default revolver and how to reload it), and an additional enemy taunt, "Die, pigs!", which was removed from the US and European versions.

== Reception ==
Reception

Review scores
| Publication | Score |
|---|---|
| AllGame | 3.5/5 (SNES); 3/5 (ARC); 2/5 (PS1) |
| Computer and Video Games | 80% (Genesis); 82% (Sega CD) |
| Electronic Gaming Monthly | 6/10 (Genesis, Sega CD, SNES) |
| Famitsu | 7/10, 5/10, 7/10, 6/10 (Genesis); 8/10, 6/10, 8/10, 6/10 (Sega CD) |
| GamesMaster | 93% (Sega CD) |
| Electronic Games | 95% (Genesis); 93% (Sega CD) |
| Mega | 89% (Genesis); 89% (Sega CD) |

In the United States, RePlay listed the game as the third top-grossing upright arcade game in November 1992, and then as the top-grossing upright arcade game from December 1992 to January 1993, before becoming one of the top five highest-grossing dedicated arcade games of 1993 in the United States. In Japan, Game Machine listed Lethal Enforcers as the top-grossing upright/cockpit arcade unit of December 1992. It was later the top-selling Sega CD game of November 1993 in the United States.

GamePro gave rave reviews for the Sega CD, Genesis, and SNES versions; for the SNES version, they cited the accuracy of the Konami Justifier, the realistic graphics, and the "appropriately hyper music". Electronic Gaming Monthly scored the SNES version 24 out of 40 (6 out of 10 average). Though they noted that the port was technically impressive, they felt the brutal violence was toned down to the point where the spirit of the game was lost.

The Lethal Enforcers I & II compilation received mediocre reviews, with critics saying that while the conversion is arcade perfect, the gameplay is simplistic and the graphics are highly static compared to contemporaries like Time Crisis (1995). Electronic Gaming Monthly gave the compilation a 4.875 out of 10, with Dan Hsu commenting that, while the Lethal Enforcers games were very good, they were both too aged to stand up against other 1997 releases and not classic enough to make a credible retro compilation.

Mega placed the game at number 35 in their "Top 50 Mega Drive Games of All Time" and number 6 in their "Top 10 Mega CD Games of All Time" list. Screen Rant listed it as the ninth best light gun shooter of all time. In 1995, Total! ranked the game 58th on its Top 100 SNES Games. In 1995, Flux magazine listed the arcade version 43rd on their "Top 100 Video Games".

=== Controversy ===
Lethal Enforcers gained controversy for its use of photorealistic imagery and was one of the video games that was part of the 1993 United States Senate hearings on video games, led by senators Joe Lieberman and Herb Kohl. Lieberman, during C-SPAN's coverage of the hearings, showed Nintendo and Sega the Konami Justifier that was bundled with the game and stated that it looked too much like a real revolver. At the time, it was pulled from toy stores, such as Toys "R" Us. Along with Night Trap and Mortal Kombat, which were also part of the hearings, the Genesis version was one of the first video games to be rated MA-17 by Sega's Videogame Rating Council. The aforementioned games also prompted the formation of the Entertainment Software Rating Board (ESRB) in the United States.

== Legacy ==
Lethal Enforcers popularized the use of digitized sprites and backgrounds in light gun shooters. Its release coincided with the release of another popular game using digitized sprites around the same time, Mortal Kombat (1992). Lethal Enforcers subsequently became the yardstick by which later light gun shooters were compared to up until the mid-1990s. Digitized sprites also became the most popular graphical representation for light gun shooters up until the mid-1990s, with the arrival of Sega AM2's Virtua Cop (1994) which replaced them with 3D polygon graphics.

=== Popular culture ===
A level in Konami's shooter Jikkyō Oshaberi Parodius is modeled after Lethal Enforcers and has the player character avoiding moving crosshairs. Both the blue and pink Konami Justifiers appear at the bottom of the screen during the stage.

The We Are Scientists album Brain Thrust Mastery contains a song entitled "Lethal Enforcer" in reference to the game. The album contains many video game related titles such as "Altered Beast", "Ghouls" (from "Ghouls 'n Ghosts") and "Gauntlet".

In the "St Hospitals" episode of Peep Show, Mark plays Lethal Enforcers 3 in an arcade while Sophie is in labour.
