= ShaoLin (PlayStation game) =

1999 video game

- European PlayStation cover art
- Developer: Polygon Magic
- Publishers: JP: Media Works; EU: THQ
- Platform: PlayStation
- Release: JP: 26 August 1999; EU: 31 March 2000
- Genre: Fighting RPG
- Modes: Single-player, multiplayer

ShaoLin, released in Japan as Lord of Fist (Note: Japanese title: ロード・オブ・フィス (Rōdo Obu Fisu)), is a 1999 PlayStation video game developed by Polygon Magic and published by Media Works in Japan and by THQ in Europe.

The game combines elements of a 3D fighting game with role-playing mechanics and features both single-player and multiplayer modes.

== Plot ==
Based on wuxia fiction, the story follows the life of a martial artist progressing through a series of combat challenges across multiple regions of 19th-century Qing dynasty China, including Guangzhou, Shanghai, Taiyuan, Cangzhou, Fuzhou, and Changsha, among a few fictional locations created for the game.

The selected martial art determines the character's backstory, starting location, and progression path.

Across the various storylines, players encounter opponents including martial artists and members of a gang led by the game's primary antagonist, Han Lao Tai.

== Gameplay ==
Jun engaging opponents during story mode.

ShaoLin includes six martial arts for the player to choose from: Shaolin, Jeet Kune Do, T'ai Chi Chuan, Eight Extremities Fist, Hung Gar, and Drunken Boxing.

=== Story mode ===
In story mode, players begin by selecting a martial art, gender, and character name; the default character name is Jun.. Players then control a martial artist who travels through different regions, interacts with non-player characters, and engages in combat encounters that advance progression.

The mode includes character development systems in which performance is influenced by factors such as food and sleep, as well as progression in mastering the selected martial art.

More than 50 enemies appear in story mode; defeated opponents can be unlocked for use in versus mode.

=== Versus mode ===
The game includes a versus mode with multiple match configurations. Available formats include matches against the computer and two-, four-, and eight-player matches.

Four-player and eight-player matches require the use of PlayStation Multitap accessories, with eight-player matches requiring two Multitaps.

Versus matches include multiple rule sets: Battle Royal (free-for-all), Team Battle (team-based), and Battle of the Schools (style-based matches).

== Development ==
ShaoLin was developed by Polygon Magic for the PlayStation using an original game engine designed to support real-time multiplayer combat.

The development team stated that the game was influenced by Hong Kong action cinema, with the intention of recreating a cinematic martial arts experience in interactive form. The game's environments are fully 3D and depict a fictionalized version of early 19th-century China.

Character designs were created with contributions from anime artist Hirotoshi Sano.

A North American release was planned but was cancelled in April 2001.

== Reception ==
David Mohr of M! Games found the fighting dull and basic, role-playing elements poorly fleshed out, and level-ups distributed arbitrarily.

The French magazine Consoles + criticized the game for its choppy animation and flawed gameplay, although it noted positive aspects such as multiplayer battles and the inclusion of multiple martial arts, giving the game a score of 20/100.
