= Police 911 =

2000 video game

- PS2 game cover for the EU version
- Developer: Konami
- Publisher: Konami
- Director: Masayuki Ohashi
- Producer: Shigenobu Matsuyama
- Designer: Masayuki Ohashi
- Programmer: Nobuya Okuda
- Composer: Jimmy Weckl
- Series: Lethal Enforcers
- Platforms: Arcade, PlayStation 2
- Release: Arcade: WW: 2000; PlayStation 2: JP: 11 November 2001; EU: 19 April 2002
- Genre: Light gun shooter
- Mode: Single-player
- Arcade system: Konami Viper

Police 911, called The Keisatsukan (ザ・警察官; lit. The Police Officer) in Japan and Police 24/7 in Europe, is a series of light gun shooter arcade games. Konami released the first game in 2000.

Unlike earlier light gun games, the game was unique for its motion sensing technology, sensing body movement rather than requiring the player to move individual controls; the player's "real world" actions are reflected by the player character within the game. It also featured a unique cover system, where the player takes cover by physically ducking for cover rather than pressing a button. The 2001 Konami arcade game MoCap Boxing used similar motion-sensing technology.

Although the game was a separate canon from the Lethal Enforcers series, Konami acknowledged Lethal Enforcers 3 as the successor to the Police 911 series, thus making it a canon in the Lethal Enforcers series.

== Gameplay ==
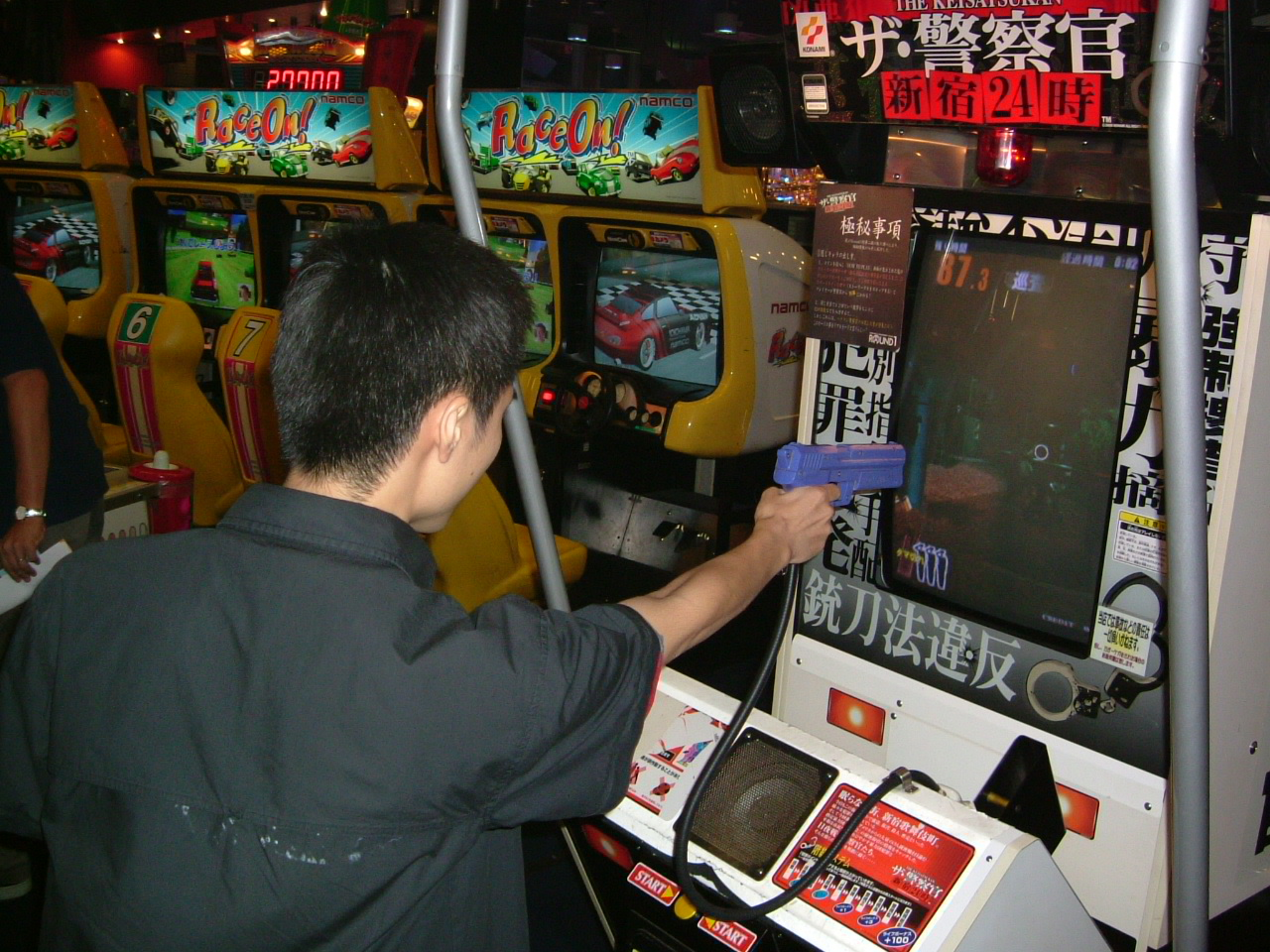
A player in Japan is playing Police 911, which players use a light gun to shoot the enemies appearing on the screen.

The gameplay in Police 911 can be considered more interactive than most light gun games: instead of merely standing in one place and shooting enemies before the player is shot, the game uses infrared sensors to determine a player's location; through this, the player is able to dodge around (with the knees, while standing on the pad), duck to avoid bullets (and reload), and lean out to maximize cover and get a better shot. This is not foolproof as the enemies will continue to shoot while the player is hiding, so it is possible to be hit upon rising from cover.

Like Time Crisis, the timer is continually running down, so one cannot hide for very long.

=== Promotions ===
As the player successfully completes each sub-part of a level, they gain a point towards a new rank. The higher a player's rank, the greater bonuses they can receive; growing time increments to start, followed by additional "lives", with the highest rank rewarding the player with 100 additional lives. However, considering that the timer continues to decrease whenever a player goes through their death animation, and that no additional time bonuses will be given after they reach that rank, this may be more of an oversight by the design team, or that the design team knows that there was no way for the player to use all those lives in one game because of the time. In addition, the player's rank reverts to the bottom whenever they get shot, so a potential strategy for a skilled player would be to ascend to the point where they gain a life, then immediately die so the time bonuses may be re-earned.

If a player shoots civilians or fellow officers, it will deduct the rank; if it is lowered below a "reward rank", the reward will not be re-earned.

The ranks are as follows:

- Officer
- Sergeant
- Lieutenant
- Captain
- Deputy Inspector
- Inspector
- Deputy Chief
- Bureau Chief
- Deputy Commissioner
- Commissioner

== Versions ==
=== Police 911 ===
The first game of the series, called The Keisatsukan: Shinjuku Ni Juu Yo Ji (ザ・警察官 新宿24時, Za Keisatsukan: Shinjuku Nijūyoji; lit. The Policeman: Shinjuku 24 Hours) in Japan, was released in 2000. It casts the player as either a "one man SWAT team" working for the Tokyo Metropolitan Police Department, or an American police officer of the LAPD, working to take down members of the Gokudo-kai (極道会), an internationally based yakuza group.

At test locations, before the game had an official title, the cabinet marquee read "Hide From and Shoot the Chinese Mafia".

The game was ported to the PlayStation 2 video game console in Japan on November 15, 2001 and in PAL territories on April 19, 2002. The game was shown to the public in E3 2001. For using the game on the PS2, players can use a USB-based motion sensor camera. This port includes minigames such as shooting balloons before they land on the ground.

=== Japanese version ===
In The Keisatsukan: Shinjuku Ni Juu Yo Ji, the players begin on the streets of Kabuki-cho of Shinjuku, taking part in a raid on a nightclub owned by the Gokudo-kai; the officers, accompanied by shielded riot squad members and surrounded by civilians, can take different routes through the club as their shooting skill dictates. Once the players exit the club, they will be alerted that the suspects have scattered all over Japan to escape arrest, and arrest warrants have been issued for the 6 most wanted criminals in Shinjuku: Shigenobu Matsuyama (松山 重信, Matsuyama Shigenobu), international weapon smuggler Richard Hansen, Keisuke Matsuoka (松岡 圭介, Matsuoka Keisuke), Bai Ei Lee (李培栄), Noriko Nagata (長田 典子, Nagata Noriko), and Katsuji Haraguchi (原口 勝治, Haraguchi Katsuji).

Throughout the Mass Arrest Plan in Tokyo, it is determined that a number of fleeing suspects have fled to America, specifically, the Little Tokyo area in Los Angeles. The LAPD and FBI are notified, and an undercover detective is immediately dispatched to arrest remaining 3 fugitives to wrap up the mass arrest campaign.

In The Keisatsukan: Shinjuku Ni Juu Yo Ji, a newspaper headline flashes on the screen whenever a civilian is shot, because he or she can actually be killed.

=== U.S./European version ===
In Police 911/Police 24/7, the gameplay missions are reversed: the raid on the nightclub takes place in Los Angeles' Little Tokyo, followed by a "boss" fight with Richard Hansen at the crowded intersection with textures and buildings being digital replicas of the actual buildings around Los Angeles' 1st St. and San Pedro St. The Highway Chase and the underground garage are next, followed by the encounter with Bai Ei Lee; this time, he is the only one in the truck. A new warehouse level follows this; the player must stop Noriko Nagata from completing the smuggling of weapons to Japan, while in the original version, Richard Hansen had already completed the operation.

At this point, it is determined that other fleeing suspects have returned to Japan, specifically, their base of operations in Kabuki-cho of Shinjuku. Tokyo's International Investigation Unit is contacted, and an undercover detective is immediately dispatched to arrest Matsuyama, Matsuoka, and Haraguchi at Ichibandai, Shinjuku Station Square, and the Shinjuku subway at the FBI's behalf.

Finally, rather than showing a newspaper headline that civilians are killed on screen by the player as displayed in The Keisatsukan: Shinjuku Ni Juu Yo Ji, the player simply loses a rank in Police 911/Police 24/7 and is reminded not to shoot civilians or colleagues, but they are otherwise unharmed.

== Reception ==
In Japan, Game Machine listed Police 911 on their February 15, 2001 issue as being the second most-successful dedicated arcade game of the month.

On release, Famitsu magazine scored the PlayStation 2 version of the game a 30 out of 40.

== Police 911 2 ==
The second game, called The Keisatsukan 2: Senkoku Tsuiseki Special (ザ・警察官2 全国大追跡スペシャル) in Japan, was released one year after the release of Police 911. The game takes place exclusively in Japan and players can choose 6 cities—Osaka, Hakata, Shinjuku, Kobe, Nagoya, and Sapporo. The first stage takes place in the scene of the crime and the following stage takes place in a shortened version of the usual city stage. The rest of the game takes place in normal stages before the player has to return to Osaka to arrest the remaining criminals.

Police 911 2 expands the original police officer role to four different characters. They can choose from a uniformed police officer (male or female), a police detective or a Special Assault Team operator, each carrying different handguns (5-round revolver, 8-round Glock, 12-round H&K MP5). In the overseas version, the police woman and the detective are male and female American Interpol Operatives holding 8-round Glocks.

The game was publicly shown during the 39th Amusement Machine Show from September 20 to 22, 2001.

=== Plot ===
Japanese organized crime activities are growing rapidly and rigidly as the Japanese government ordered a nationwide arrest plan (Senkoku Tsuiseki) throughout the whole nation to arrest all involved criminals. Criminal activity has increased by order of the infamous Gokudo-kai yakuza group, who has entered a partnership with a Hong Kong Triad called Ryuuto (龍頭) (Dragonhead in English). Finally, a mysterious kingpin is hiding behind-the-scenes to ensure that Japan falls down to the hands of the Gokudo-kai and the Ryuuto.

Players start the investigation inside an office building where a collaboration deal is taking place between the Gokudo-kai and the Dragonheads. After arresting the first wave of criminals, nationwide arrest warrants have been issued for the capture of the following suspects holed in Osaka, Hakata, Shinjuku, Kobe, Nagoya, and Sapporo: Ko Bun Yuen (高 浜元), Koji Umezawa (梅沢 幸治, Umezawa Koji), Tadanobu Abe (阿部 忠信, Abe Tadanobu), Ku Ka Hang (古 家亙), Koji Motomura (sometimes mistranslated as Hiroshi Motomura; 本村 弘司 Motomura Koji), Sadaharu Kitaya (sometimes mistranslated as Sadaharu Kitadani; 北谷 貞治 Kitaya Sadaharu), and Hung Ko Cheung (熊 谷章). Arresting 3 behind-the-scene criminals throughout the game gives players a chance to capture the behind-the-scenes kingpin, Shigenobu Matsuyama (松山 重信, Matsuyama Shigenobu).

=== Reception ===
In Japan, Game Machine listed Police 911 2 on their February 1, 2002 issue as being the sixth most-successful dedicated arcade game of the month.

== Trademark ==
As of 2021, Konami filed registration papers for The Keisatsukan in Japan.
