= Lethal Enforcers 3 =

2004 video game

- North American arcade flyer
- Developers: Polygon Magic; Konami
- Publisher: Konami
- Producer: Shigenobu Matsuyama
- Series: Lethal Enforcers
- Platform: Arcade
- Release: JP: November 2004; NA: April 2005
- Genre: Rail shooter
- Modes: Single-player, multiplayer
- Arcade system: Konami PC based hardware

Lethal Enforcers 3, known as Seigi no Hero (セイギノヒーロー or 正義のヒーロー—Heroes of Justice) in Japan, is a 3D arcade light gun game which is the third and final installment in Konami's Lethal Enforcers series. This installment is produced by Shigenobu Matsuyama.

== Gameplay ==
Lethal Enforcers 3 has players play as six different law enforcement roles in various scenarios in present-day Tokyo, Japan. The policewoman is a hidden character.

Players make their way towards checkpoints while shooting criminals, terrorists, or fugitives. Weapons such as submachine guns, shotguns, sniper rifles, and assault rifles are also available during each mission.

Like Konami's earlier Warzaid/World Combat, players point and/or shoot outside the screen to deploy their shields. Raising the shield allows players to protect themselves from incoming enemy fire at the expense of an inability to advance towards the goal.

Unlike previous installments, players can compete with each other in making their way to checkpoints in various areas, in addition to capturing wanted criminals and earning promotions. Also, players do not lose lives when they shoot innocent civilians, instead they face being demoted.

The light gun is used in the game with a vibration to immerse the players in the stages.

Much of the game's gameplay, music and mannerisms are reminiscent of Police 911, so much to the point where it could be considered a quasi-sequel.

== Scenarios ==
Lethal Enforcers 3/Seigi no Hero allows players to play the stages in the order they desire (with the exception of the Diet Building a.k.a. "Lethal Enforcers 3/Seigi no Hero" stage). With the exception of the Cops in the City stage, players have access to a 10-round Glock handgun as a standard munition.

There are 6 stages in all:

- In the first stage "Cops in The City" (The Police Officer: The Great Criminal Investigation of the Afternoon (ザ・警察官:真昼の大捜査線, Za Keisatsukan: Mahiru No Dai Sousa-Sen) in Japan), the players play as Tokyo Metro Police Officers to stop an armed robbery spree in Akihabara.
- In the second stage "Coast Intruders" (Pursue the Suspicious Ships: The Future of Japan Coast Guard Act (あの不審船を追え 海上保安法の行方, Ano Fushin Fune o Oe Kaijou Hoan-Chou No Yukue) in Japan), the players play as Japan Coast Guard officers to stop Dragonhead (Ryuto) Drug Dealers from entering Shinagawa Port illegally.
- In the third stage "Rival Heat" (Rival Detective (ライバル刑事, Raibaru Keiji) in Japan), the players play as rival plainclothes officers in detective work to stop a subway gun smuggling spree operated by Gokudo-Kai Executives.
- In the fourth stage "Airport 2004" (Break-in! 24 Hours in the Huge Airport (突入!大空港24時, Totsunyuu! Tai kuukou ni juu yon toki) in Japan), the players play as Riot Police Unit officers to quell violent mysterious radicals at the Narita International Airport.
- In the fifth stage "Justice & Judgment" (Lethal Enforcers 3 (リーサル・エンフォーサーズ3, Riisaru Enfousaazu 3) in Japan), the players play as Special Forces Group commandos to stop foreign terrorists from blowing up a nuclear power plant.
- In the last stage "Lethal Enforcers 3" ("Seigi No Hero" in Japan), the players play as SAT Operatives to stop a coup d'état orchestrated by a rogue JGSDF Kanto Regiment in the National Diet Building.
