= List of cancelled Panasonic M2 games =

Cancelled video game console

The Panasonic M2 was a cancelled game console intended for release sometime between 1996 and 1997.

Confirmed M2 licensees with no known plans or information include Asmik, Cryo Interactive, Glams, Gremlin Interactive, Heatsink, HighTech Laboratory Japan, Imagineer, Infogrames, Jaleco, Koei, Microcabin, Micronet, Pack-In-Video, Sala International, Sanai Enterprise, Takara, Taito, Team17, and a collaboration between Tomy and Tose. Namco, ASCII Corporation, Treasure, Hudson Soft and Enix would be added to that list one year later by a former 3DO employee.

Title(s)	Notes/Reasons	Developer	Publisher
Alien Seed	Nothing is known about the project, other than it would have had real-time rendering.	Art Data Interactive	Art Data Interactive
Army Men	Development was moved to Windows before the M2's cancellation, due to the uncertainty surrounding its release.	Studio 3DO	Studio 3DO
Battle Isle		Blue Byte	
BattleSport II	A sequel to BattleSport on the original 3DO. Development was seemingly moved to PlayStation before the M2's cancellation. The game would ultimately never release.	Cyclone Studios	Studio 3DO
ClayFighter III	Intended as a launch title. Development was moved to Nintendo 64 as Interplay could not afford waiting for delays on the M2's release. Producer Jeremy Airey also expressed his annoyance working with the hardware during an interview.	Interplay Productions	Interplay Productions
Croc: Legend of the Gobbos	M2 and Nintendo 64 versions were under consideration, according to the game's design document.	Argonaut Games	Fox Interactive
D2	Intended as a launch title. Development would be moved to Sega Saturn, before starting from scratch on Dreamcast. This was to be completely different from the Dreamcast version.	Warp	Panasonic
DeathKeep 2	A sequel to the Dungeons & Dragons-themed action RPG DeathKeep.		Strategic Simulations
Descent II	Intended as a launch title. Cancelled as Interplay could not afford waiting for delays on the M2's release.	Interplay Productions	Interplay Productions
Digital Dance Mix Vol. 1 Namie Amuro	A port of the Sega Saturn title showcased at the Digitalmedia World Expo in 1997.	Sega	Panasonic
Disruptor	Intended as a launch title. The M2 version would've been handled by a separate studio from Insomniac Games. Cancelled due to lack of communication about the M2's release date from Panasonic.		Universal Interactive Studios
Dream Team Basketball		Anvil Incorporated	U.S. Gold
Dungeon Game	Initially conceived by the 3DO Company as a tech demo for its appearance at E3 1995, the project would seemingly fall under Matsushita after buying the rights to the hardware.		Panasonic Wondertainment
EF2000		Digital Image Design	Ocean Software
EMF Racing	Listed on character artist Jung Lee's portfolio. Despite Konami already following through with the use of M2 in arcades, the game would never materialize.	Konami Amusement of America	Konami
Escape from L.A.	Also planned for Sega Saturn, PlayStation and PC. Cancelled due to developer Burst Studios' lack of interest.	Burst Studios	Virgin Interactive Entertainment
G3	A 3D-rendered take on action platformers such as Elevator Action and Impossible Mission. The title was codenamed G3 in reference to it being designer Greg Gorsiski's third game for the company after Jurassic Park Interactive and Blade Force. A PlayStation version was also rumored by Electronic Gaming Monthly.	Studio 3DO	Studio 3DO
Galactic Conquest	An M2 version was only mentioned briefly. Development was moved to Windows before the M2's cancellation. The game would never materialize.	Studio 3DO	Studio 3DO
Gex: Enter the Gecko	This may have been the scrapped 2D version of the project, as it was announced before the project's switch to 3D following E3 1996.	Crystal Dynamics	
Heart of Darkness		Amazing Studio	Virgin Interactive Entertainment
Heat of Eleven '98		Konami	Konami
High Heat Baseball 1999	One of the remaining two projects under Studio 3DO right before the M2's cancellation. Originally intended as a 3DO title, development was moved to M2 and then Windows.	Team .366	Studio 3DO
HMS Carnage / Dreadnought	Also planned for PC, PlayStation and Sega Saturn. Cancelled after Infogrames' buyout of Ocean in 1996.	Tribe	Ocean Software
IMSA World Championship Racing	Intended as a launch title. This was one of the remaining two M2 projects developed by the 3DO Company right before the M2's cancellation. Development was moved to Windows, although this version never materialised either.	Studio 3DO	Studio 3DO
Iron & Blood: Warriors of Ravenloft	Development on the M2 version was halted in a mutual agreement between Take-Two and the 3DO Company.	Take-Two Interactive	
John Daly Golf	Intended as a launch title. Development was moved to Windows before the M2's cancellation, due to the uncertainty surrounding its release.	Studio 3DO	Studio 3DO
Killer	Developer Millennium Interactive would be acquired by Sony Computer Entertainment Europe in 1997.	Millennium Interactive	
M2 Racer	Initially conceived by the 3DO Company as a tech demo for its appearance at E3 1995, the project would seemingly fall under Matsushita after buying the rights to the hardware. Confirmed to be separate from IMSA World Championship Racing. A prototype for the game was found on the same disc as the Trouble Decker tech demo.		Panasonic Wondertainment
Madden NFL 98	Intended as a launch title. In October 1996, Electronic Arts would confirm they were waiting for licensing information to be made public before continuing M2 development.	Electronic Arts	Electronic Arts
Magic Carpet 2: The Netherworlds		Bullfrog Productions	Electronic Arts
MechWarrior 2: 31st Century Combat		Activision	Activision
Mega Man X3		Capcom	Capcom
Memory Breaker	A scrolling shooter showcased at the Digitalmedia World Expo in 1997. This and Genki's untitled rail shooter may be one and the same.		Panasonic
Meridian 59		Archetype Interactive	Studio 3DO
Necrodome	Was only under consideration, not in active development.		Strategic Simulations
Need for Speed II	In October 1996, Electronic Arts would confirm they were waiting for licensing information to be made public before continuing M2 development.	Electronic Arts	Electronic Arts
NFLPA Superstars	A 6v6 backyard football game with NFL stars as playable characters. The game's $1 million development contract was to help fund the development of Diablo. Condor, now renamed Blizzard North, would be acquired by Blizzard Entertainment and leave the project.	Condor	Studio 3DO
NHL 97	Intended as a launch title. In October 1996, Electronic Arts would confirm they were waiting for licensing information to be made public before continuing M2 development.	Electronic Arts	Electronic Arts
NHL Open Ice	Intended as a launch title.	Williams Entertainment	Panasonic
Olympic Soccer	Intended as a launch title.	Silicon Dreams	U.S. Gold
Olympic Summer Games		Silicon Dreams	U.S. Gold
POD	Work on an M2 version was mentioned in programmer Julien Merceron's biographies for E3 2004 and Game Developers Conference 2011.	Ubi Soft	Ubi Soft
Power Crystal	An action role-playing game created by the lead designer of Alien vs Predator. Initially published by Studio 3DO, although the publisher would drop out due to unknown reasons. Developer Perceptions would file for liquidation on February 28, 1997.	Perceptions	
Power Stone	Development would be moved to Dreamcast.	Capcom	Capcom
Quake		id Software	
Realms of Valor	A 4-player fighting game set in the world of Dungeons & Dragons. Intended as a launch title. Development was moved to Nintendo 64 as Interplay could not afford waiting for delays on the M2's release. It would be renamed to Raze, set for Q4 1997 and later Q1 1998, before it was ultimately cancelled.	Interplay Productions	Interplay Productions
Return Fire 2	Intended as a launch title. Would be formally announced at E3 1997 for PC and PlayStation, with no mention of an M2 version.	Silent Software	MGM Interactive
Road Rash	Intended as a launch title. In October 1996, Electronic Arts would confirm they were waiting for licensing information to be made public before continuing M2 development.	Electronic Arts	Electronic Arts
Rock & Roll Racing	Cancelled as Interplay could not afford waiting for delays on the M2's release.	Interplay Productions	Interplay Productions
Rush	A inline skating-themed take on Electronic Arts' Road Rash. A model of a rollerblader was found and preserved, which may be an asset from Rush considering the theme.	Studio 3DO	Studio 3DO
Shining Sword	A role-playing game also intended for PlayStation. American Laser Games would fold into HeR Interactive, cancelling the game outright.	American Laser Games	
Silver	Announced under Ocean Software, before Infogrames' buyout and eventual folding of the company. The game would be released under Infogrames.	Tribe	Ocean Software
Space Age Mercury	A space flight simulation tech demo by the 3DO Company.	Studio 3DO	Studio 3DO
Star Fighter 6000 / Star Fighter 64		Krisalis Software	Studio 3DO
Star General	Was only under consideration, not in active development.		Strategic Simulations
Street Fighter III		Capcom	Capcom
Strider 2	Would be moved to the Dreamcast-based Naomi board, before then exclusively releasing on PlayStation.	Capcom	Capcom
Striker		Rage Software	
Super Bikes	Developer Millennium Interactive would be acquired by Sony Computer Entertainment Europe in 1997.	Millennium Interactive	
Tokimeki Memorial		Konami	Konami
Top Gun: Fire at Will!	Intended as a launch title.	Spectrum HoloByte	Spectrum HoloByte
Trouble Decker: Deep Sea Fortress	A tech demo not intended for public release. This demo was demonstrated as early as October 1995, and would continue to be used until November 1997.	LINKS Corporation Umigame Jimusho Corporation	Panasonic Wondertainment
Unknown arcade port	Intended as a launch title. Was likely a port of one of Konami's early M2-based titles, such as Tobe! Polystars, as per their contract with Matsushita.	Konami	Konami
Untitled action game	The music was to be composed by Sizlla Okamura, known for his work on Viewpoint.		Panasonic Wondertainment
Untitled action role-playing game	On November 8th, 2017, game designer and former K-Idea employee Kaz Ayabe would reveal his involvement on a cancelled action RPG for the M2. The game would never materialise due to the M2's cancellation. Following these events, Ayabe would leave the company and create Boku no Natsuyasumi for Sony.	K-Idea	Panasonic Wondertainment
Untitled American Laser Games project		American Laser Games	
Untitled Aorn project	A December 1996 archive of the website for contract developer Aorn mentions the first-party studio behind the M2, Panasonic Wondertainment, as one of their clients.	Aorn	Panasonic Wondertainment
Untitled Attention to Detail project	A recruitment ad in the March 1999 issue of Edge would show a job opening at Attention to Detail, confirming the studio had at one point developed for the M2. Nothing is known about this project.	Attention to Detail	
Untitled baseball game	Intended as a launch title.	Crystal Dynamics	
Untitled Boss Game Studios project	In the credits of Top Gear Rally, Panasonic Wondertainment managing director Takeshi Matsuo is listed under Special Thanks. This may hint this would've been a port of the same game.	Boss Game Studios	
Untitled Death Race 2000-inspired game			Studio 3DO
Untitled fighting game		Studio 3DO	Studio 3DO
Untitled horizontal shooter	Former Warashi programmer and co-founder Tsutomu Tabata would confirm the existence of a side-scrolling shooter commissioned by Panasonic Wondertainment. The game had already gone gold before the M2's cancellation, and likely would've been a launch title. This may be the sample shooter title shown at COMDEX Japan '97.	Warashi	Panasonic Wondertainment
Untitled Iguana Entertainment project		Iguana Entertainment	Acclaim Entertainment
Untitled racing game	Intended as a launch title.	Crystal Dynamics	
Untitled rail shooter	Genki would be a confirmed developer early on into the M2's prelife, a pre-rendered demo of theirs debuting at an October 1995 presentation. Rumoured to be in the style of Sega's Panzer Dragoon. Development commenced inbetween Kileak: The DNA Imperative and Jade Cocoon: Story of the Tamamayu, according to Phantom Crash director Ichiro Kojima. This and Memory Breaker may be one and the same.	Genki	
Untitled Shiny project	Shiny Entertainment was working on a game for the M2, according to studio head David Perry. Perry would continue to be consulted on M2 development by publications, hinting that the project may have still been in active development before the M2's cancellation.	Shiny Entertainment	Interplay Productions
Untitled soccer game		Elite Systems	
Untitled soccer game		Studio 3DO	Studio 3DO
Untitled tabletop game(s)	In a 1996 interview with Panasonic Wondertainment managing director Takeshi Matsuo, he would cite the existence of tabletop-style games for the M2 alongside racing, fighting and action.		
Untitled Thexder installment	An animation of the main protagonist from Thexder was discovered and preserved as a demo playable on M2 hardware.	Game Arts	
Untitled Zener Works project	The game had already gone gold before the M2's cancellation, and likely would've been a launch title. Zener Works would later be courted by Sony Computer Entertainment to develop Okage: Shadow King for PlayStation, and later PlayStation 2.	Zener Works	
Virtua Fighter Remix		SegaSoft	SegaSoft
VR Baseball	Cancelled as Interplay could not afford waiting for delays on the M2's release.	Interplay Productions	Interplay Productions
VR Football	Cancelled as Interplay could not afford waiting for delays on the M2's release. The game would never materialize.		Interplay Productions
VR Golf		Gremlin Interactive	Interplay Productions
VR Soccer		Gremlin Interactive	Interplay Productions
War Gods	Intended as a launch title.	Williams Entertainment	Panasonic
Wing Commander IV: The Price of Freedom	Intended as a launch title.	Origin Systems	Electronic Arts
World League Soccer '98		Silicon Dreams	Eidos Interactive
