= CDS Software =

Video game publisher

CDS Software (also known as CDS Micro Systems for its earlier titles) was an independent publisher and developer of computer game software based in Doncaster, South Yorkshire, UK.

== History ==
The company was founded by Ian Williams, a computer programmer from Doncaster who started developing games for the Sinclair ZX80 shortly after its launch. After the initial company success he employed Giles Hunter (a manager from Doncaster W.H Smiths) to help expand the business. He sold his company to Giles Hunter to pursue other interests in 1985.

In 1985, the company launched the Blue Ribbon budget label.

In 1988 CDS Software, under the CDS group of companies changed its name to Nimrod Holdings Ltd, also publishing games for the Amiga. Publishing continued under the CDS Software Label until the early 1990s.

=== Guildhall Leisure Services ===
The company operated as RHSCO One Limited between January and March 1994, and then as Guildhall Leisure Services between March 1994 and May 2002. As Guildhall, the company published games for the Amiga including the well-regarded title Gloom.

=== iDigicon ===
Subsequently, the company operated as iDigicon Limited until its dissolution in May 2013.

== Games ==
The first games released in 1982-3 were for the 16k ZX Spectrum consisting mainly of clones of arcade games. The company expanded to different formats with titles like Steve Davis Snooker and Colossus Chess seeing releases on most platforms of the day.

The launch of the budget label Blue Ribbon saw simple arcade type games diverted to that label with CDS concentrating on full price titles, often incorporating tie-in licences such as Brian Clough's Football Fortunes and Sporting Triangles. They also released the computer game crossed with a board game, TankAttack. The Complete Home Entertainment Centre was a compendium of games that were later split and sold as stand alone titles by Blue Ribbon (such as Video Card Arcade and Dominoes).

In the early 90s, CDS re-issued or picked up UK distribution of games for companies such as D&H Games (e.g. Multi-Player Soccer Manager), MicroIllusions (e.g. Fire Power) and Artworx (e.g. the Strip Poker games).

=== 8-bit games published ===
- Gobble a Ghost (1982)
- 3D Painter (1983)
- Bozy Boa (1983)
- Caterpillar (1983)
- Leapfrog (1983)
- Magic Meanies (1983)
- French is Fun (1983)
- Othello (1983)
- Pool (1983)
- Reversi (1983)
- Winged Warlords (1983)
- German is Fun (1984)
- Italian is Fun (1984)
- Steve Davis Snooker (1984)
- Timebomb (1984)
- Spanish is Fun (1985)
- Colossus Chess 4 (1986)
- Colossus Bridge 4 (1986)
- Brian Clough's Football Fortunes (1987)
- Tank Attack (1988)
- Video Card Arcade (1988)
- Sporting Triangles (1989)
- European Superleague (1990)

=== 16-bit games published ===
As CDS:

- Bravo Romeo Delta (1992), Frankenstein
- Rugby Coach (1992), D&H Games
- Colossus Bridge X (1992)

As Guildhall:

- Xtreme Racing (1995), Silltunna
- Fears (1995), Bomb
- Gloom (1995), Black Magic Software
- Legends (1996), Krisalis
- Minskies Furballs (1997), Binary Emotions

=== Re-release games ===
- Spectrum Safari (1984)
- Fire Power (1988)
- Centerfold Squares (1988)
- Blitzkrieg at the Ardennes (1989)
- Dr. Plummet's House of Flux (1989)
- Multi-Player Soccer Manager (1991)

=== Idigicon Games ===
- Platypus (2002)
- Binman (2002)
- Mah Jong (2003)
- Mumble Jumble (2003)
- Beep the Bunny Sheep (2004)
- Battle Batz (2005)
- Farmerama (2005)
- Maxx Trucks (2006)
- NUX (2006)
- Mah Jong Deluxe (2006)
- Polar Kubes (2006)
- Hamsters (2006)
- Platypus II (2007)
