= Steve Davis World Snooker =

1989 video game

- Atari ST box art
- Developer: Binary Design
- Publishers: CDS Software, Artworx software
- Platforms: Atari ST, Amiga
- Release: EU: 1989; NA: 1989
- Genre: Sports simulation – snooker
- Modes: Single-player, multiplayer

Steve Davis World Snooker is a sports simulation video game developed by Binary Design and published by CDS Software. It simulates different types of cue sports, specifically snooker, pool and billiards. Released under licence from 6-time Snooker World Champion, Steve Davis, it is a sequel to their 1984 game Steve Davis Snooker.

== Development ==
The game had specific contributions from programmer Mick West, whom this was his first Amiga game he programmed. He stated that it took the team "around 6 months" to program the game, and was harder as the game's artist was not full-time. West also described the development style; "For Steve Davis, I'd code on one machine, write it to a floppy, and then insert it into another machine. Rather slow, but then the game was small, so loaded quickly."

== Overview ==
World Snooker is an updated 16-bit version of CDS Software's earlier 8-bit Steve Davis game. Game Modes include; ten or fifteen red ball snooker, pool (including variants eight-ball, nine-ball and blackball and english and carom billiards. All games modes can be played in single-player, multiplayer, or against the AI, with the AI taking the form of Steve Davis. The program has six different levels of playing skill. The view is fixed overhead, however you can zoom in on the table, with the option of slow motion replays. The game also has a practice mode, in which lines indicate what the results of a shot will be, and balls can be moved around to set up trick shots.

== Reception ==
Reception

Review scores
Publication	Score
Computer and Video Games	72% (Atari ST); 72% (Amiga)
Zzap	75% (Amiga)
The Games Machine	81% (Amiga); 81% (Atari ST)
ACE	540/1000 (ST)

World Snooker received average to positive results from critics. Computer and Video Games magazine scored the game at 72% on both versions. CVG praised the game's "brilliant" presentation, that was "bound to appeal to fans of the sport" but criticized the game's high difficulty, but did acknowledge there was "plenty to keep enthusiasts amused for hours on end".

Zzap magazine also scored the game highly at 75% when reviewing the Amiga version, saying the game was "a pretty slick snooker sim which is bound to appeal to all Davis fans." The Games Machine rated the game highly at 81% for both versions of the game, saying it was a "must have for mouse-wielding cue freaks."

Advanced Computing Entertainment magazine gave the game, 540/1000 commenting that while "It's fun to play as a game in its own right, and does have lasting interest, as long as you appreciate its idiosyncrasies", "genuine snooker and pool enthusiasts won't be greatly impressed."
