= Equestrian Showjumper =

1986 video game

- Publisher: Artworx
- Release: 1986

Equestrian Showjumper is a 1986 video game published by Artworx.

== Gameplay ==
Equestrian Showjumper is a game in which 12 different courses are available, and the player can design a new steeplechase course.

== Reception ==
Rick Teverbaugh reviewed the game for Computer Gaming World, and stated that "[compared to other Artworx sports titles] Equestrian is my favorite."
