= Jungle (console) =

Portable video game console

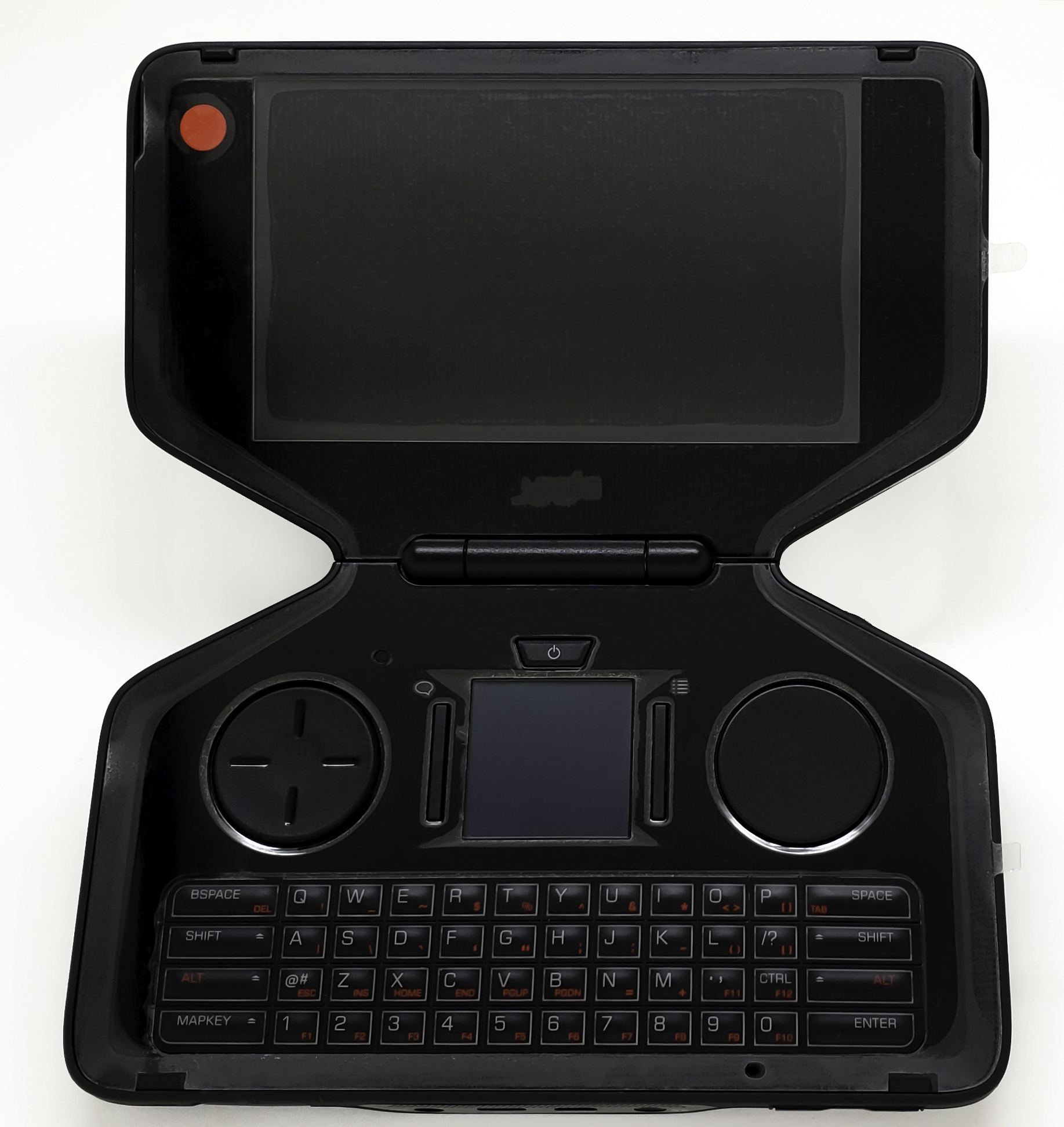
- Prototype Panasonic 'Jungle'
- Manufacturer: Panasonic
- Type: Handheld game console
- Generation: Eighth generation
- Lifespan: Cancelled (was expected to be released in mid-2011)
- CPU: NVIDIA Tegra series SOC
- Related: 3DO Interactive Multiplayer; Panasonic M2

The Jungle was a portable game console in development by Panasonic, and announced in October 2010. With a design being roughly similar to a small laptop, it was developed as a portable platform for MMOs and aimed at players who wanted to play online games on the go. The Jungle was also Panasonic's first attempt at creating a handheld console. It was expected to be released in mid-2011, effectively putting it into the eighth generation of gaming along with the Nintendo 3DS and the then-unreleased PlayStation Vita.

The system was to be the second dedicated video game console released by Panasonic, after the 3DO from 1993. In 1997, Panasonic was developing a new console called the Panasonic M2, but the company canceled the project.

On March 1, 2011, Panasonic announced the cancellation of the Jungle, "due to changes in the market".

== Games ==
Three games were announced for the release of the Jungle in October 2010:

- Stellar Dawn
- RuneScape
- Battlestar Galactica Online

== Features ==
These were announced features for the Jungle:

- D-pad
- Touchpad
- Full QWERTY keyboard
- 3.5 mm jack
- USB and HDMI ports
- Linux-based operating system (unconfirmed)
- 720p high-resolution display (unconfirmed)
