= Vampire King =

Vampi King may refer to:

- Vampire Evil King, a boss in Okage
- Count Dracula, called the Vampire King in the novel Dracula by Bram Stoker as well as the Vampire Hunter D series
- Alucard (Hellsing), depicted as Count Dracula in the Hellsing series
- Vampire King, a character in the Adventure Time miniseries "Stakes"
