= Hole-In-One Golf (1986 video game) =

1986 sports video game

- Developer(s): Walter D LaCroix
- Publisher(s): Artworx
- Platform(s): Commodore 64, Atari ST
- Release: 1986
- Genre(s): Sports

Hole-In-One Golf is a 1986 golf simulation video game published by Artworx.

== Gameplay ==
Hole-In-One Golf simulates a round of golf for one to eight players. Using the joystick, players can select which club to use and control shot strength, direction and hook/slice for each shot. When putting, only strength and direction need to be chosen, and greens are always flat.

Courses are built from components including fairway, trees, rough and other types of hazard. A single 18-hole country club course is provided, but unusually the game includes a course designer that allows the player to construct their own courses and save them to disk.

== Reception ==
Rick Teverbaugh reviewed the Commodore 64 version for Computer Gaming World, and stated that "What you wouldn't expect out of a $9.95 program is a game system that enables you to do something that no other golf game attempts and that is to undercut the ball and actually get a backup when it lands."

Mark Cotone for Commodore Microcomputers said that "It's complete, it's authentic, and it's available for the price of a single greens fee."

Dan A. Sieben for Midnite Software Gazette said that "The simulation is completed with the addition of appropriate sound effects. Hole in One Golf is truly an extraordinary piece of software. It is undoubtedly a great buy at any price. Highly Recommended."

ST-Log #10 (January 1987) reviewed the Atari ST version, saying that "the Hole-In-One program is versatile and challenging—a good buy."
