= Sewer King =

Sewer King may refer to:

- Sewer Evil King, from the video game Okage: Shadow King
- Sewer King (Batman), a minor character from the animated series
