= Van Arno =

American artist (1963–2021)

Van Arno (1963–2021) was an American figurative painter, illustrator, and art instructor based in Los Angeles, California. He was associated with the Lowbrow art movement and known for his dramatic paintings featuring heroic figures in extreme postures.

== Early life and education ==
Van Arno was born in Chattanooga, Tennessee in 1963 and grew up in St. Louis, Missouri. As a child he spent time in public libraries, where books on mythology and history—particularly the pirate illustrations of Howard Pyle—first drew him to drawing. He attended Otis Parsons School of Design in Los Angeles.

== Career ==
=== Illustration and commercial work ===
While attending Otis Parsons, Arno worked as a bouncer and created logo designs for LA hair metal bands. In the early 1990s he worked as a commercial illustrator with credits including storyboarding for Robotech, deck designs for Powell Peralta, and box art for Bandai Games. He also created artwork for the music industry and worked for several magazines and on online animation projects.

=== Video game work ===
Arno created all the artwork for Return Fire (1995), a critically acclaimed vehicular combat game originally released for the 3DO Interactive Multiplayer. This was his first video game project and his first time working with computer art. Game creator Reichart Von Wolfsheild specifically recruited Arno for his distinctive artistic style, teaching him to use a computer despite having no prior digital art experience. Arno also created the box art for Fire Power, the predecessor to Return Fire.

=== Fine art ===
Arno developed a painting style focused on heroic figurative works featuring religious, folk, pop culture, and mythical subjects. Working in the tradition of Western art, he drew inspiration from painters including Rubens, Michelangelo, and Caravaggio. His work was characterized by extreme figurative postures and compositions. Notable among his series were paintings reimagining the Popeye character Olive Oyl.

His 2011 solo exhibition "The Minstrel Cycle" at Jonathan LeVine Gallery in New York included works depicting Angela Davis and a painting of Josephine Baker focused on her World War II Allied intelligence activities. A painting from the show, True Love Rescued After Long Debate, was used as a cover by Hey! magazine in Paris.

His work was exhibited in Los Angeles, Seattle, Santa Fe, Nashville, and New York. Museum exhibitions included participation in the "Land of Retinal Delights" exhibition at the Laguna Art Museum in 2008, and shows at the Riverside Art Museum in 2010 and 2011. Gallery representation included Thinkspace Projects and Corey Helford Gallery in Los Angeles and Factory Art Galerie in Paris.

=== Teaching ===
Arno served as a drawing instructor at the Gnomon School of Visual Effects in Los Angeles.

== Recognition ==
Arno's work was featured in Juxtapoz magazine and included in surveys of Lowbrow art. His paintings were collected by Patricia Arquette, Perry Farrell, Morgan Spurlock, and Lydia Hearst.

At auction, his work has achieved prices ranging from $1,562 to $7,500 USD, with a record price of $7,500 for Consumption Consumes Camille sold at Heritage Auctions in 2023.

== Death ==
Van Arno died in 2021. His death was noted in Artillery Magazine.
