= Tessa Sanderson on screen and stage =

Tessa Sanderson CBE (born 14 March 1956) is a British former javelin thrower. She appeared in every Olympics from 1976 to 1996, winning the gold medal in 1984, and becoming the second track and field athlete to compete at six Olympics. She is the first Black British woman to win an Olympic gold medal. Since 1979, Sanderson has appeared as a guest on numerous television shows as a guest. When Sky News was launched in 1989, Sanderson was a sports reporter for the channel, and she co-hosted ITV's Surprise Surprise with Cilla Black.

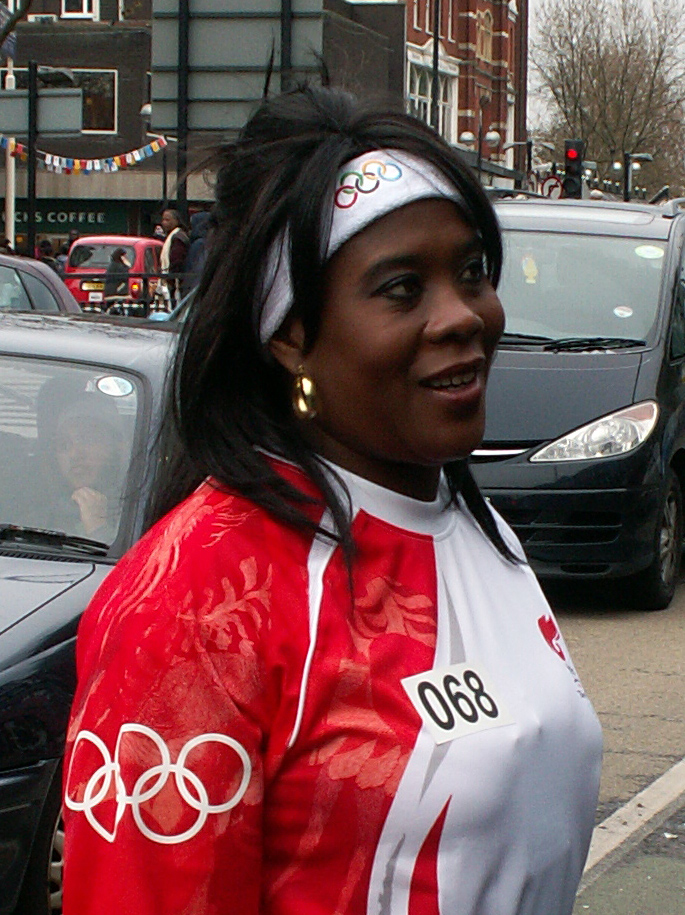
Tessa Sanderson in 2008

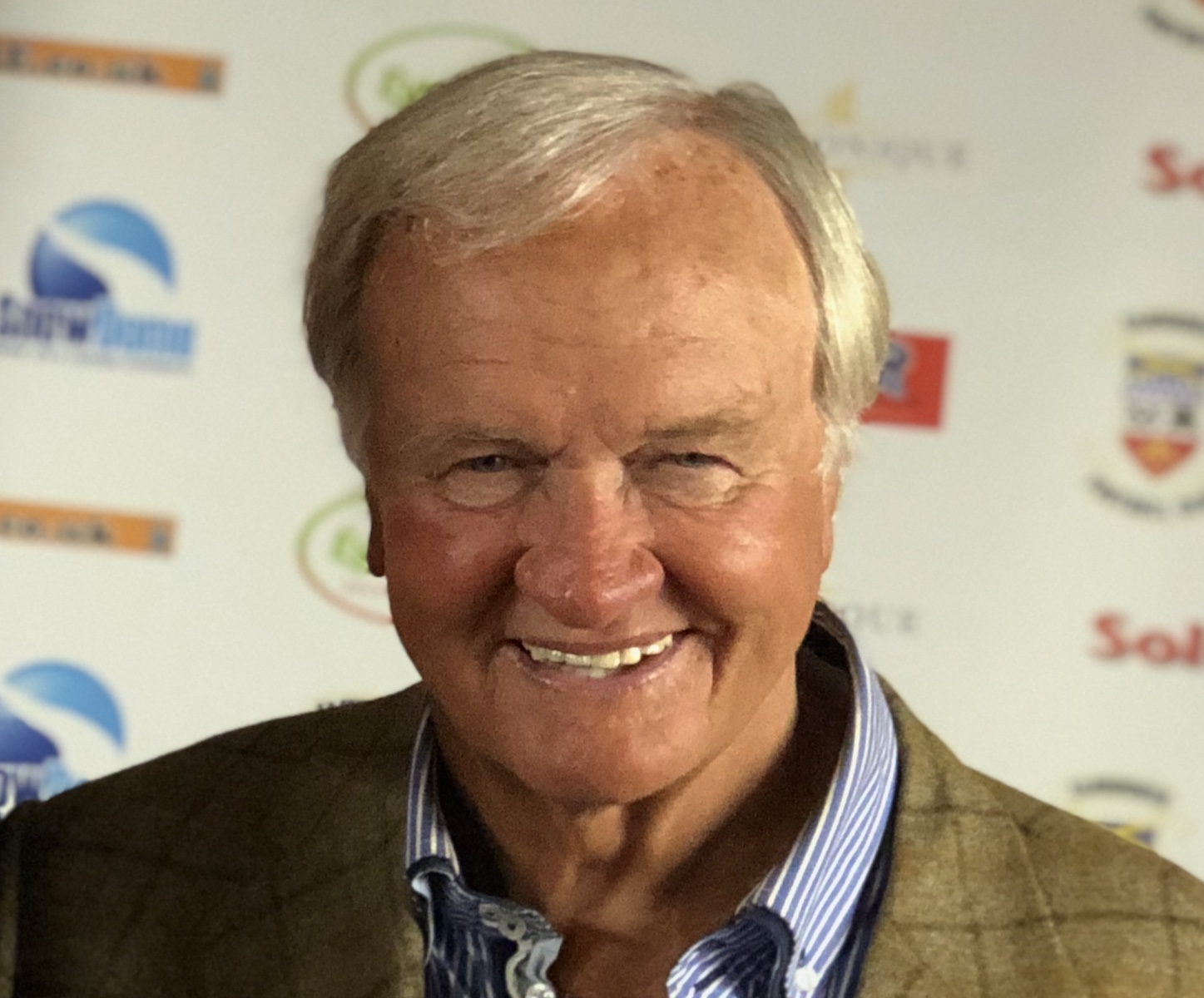
Ron Atkinson, who was paired with Sanderson on Celebrity Wife Swap

The quiz programme Sporting Triangles featured Sanderson as a regular team captain in 1987 and 1988, but she was not asked to return in 1989. She noted that in the new series of the show, all three team captains were footballers, and felt that replacing her with Emlyn Hughes reduced the variety in the show, also claiming that she had ignored invitations to guest on the new series.

Announcing that Sanderson would be a reporter on Sky News, covering all sports and not only athletics, Sky's Head of News John O'Loan said that she had been selected "because her sporting credentials are excellent. On top of that, she has a sparkling personality and she is very intelligent." Sanderson was one of around 30 journalists and reporters on the channel when Sky News launched in February 1989. In April of that year, the Birmingham Evening Mail's Paul Cole praised Sanderson's "outspoken enthusiasm" and willingness to express her opinions frankly. David Powell of The Times wrote in 1996 that by the time she started on Sky News, "Sanderson, who appeared in Los Angeles as a curly-haired, round-faced, non-sexy athlete, had realised the benefits of developing her femininity" and that "Her name and make-up survived a two-year battle against her uncomfortable delivery before she was made redundant." Six years earlier, Sanderson had told Powell that her role at Sky was not as lucrative as people might expect, and that some athletes were earning more than she was as a presenter, which was one reason she had decided against retiring from athletics. Sanderson starred in the fitness videos Cardiofunk (1990) and Body Blitz (c. 1992) with Derrick Evans, later known as Mr. Motivator.

During the 1990s, Sanderson appeared in pantomime several time. She twice played Girl Friday in Robinson Crusoe, and was also The Genie in Aladdin and the Fairy Godmother in Cinderella . Justin Cartwright in The Sunday Telegraph, discussing Sanderson's pantomime debut in 1990, wrote that "She plays the whole thing with an amiable smile and the air of someone trying not to bump into the furniture." Her fellow cast member Peter Byrne was quoted by Cartwright as saying that Sanderson was "a natural ... the camera loves her". According to Robin Thornber of The Guardian, the casting of Sanderson, with Russell Grant and Evadne Hinge, proved commercially successful. A Daily Telegraph piece by Robert Gore-Langton praised Sanderson's 1994–95 performance, again as Girl Friday, as "marvellous", while Christopher Day of The Stage wrote that she "seemed confidently at ease in panto". In 1993, Sanderson and snooker player Dennis Taylor were Babes in the Wood in a pantomime edition of Big Break Christmas Special on BBC1.

Performing a "traditional 'dance celebrating the return home of the menfolk'" on the 2005 Strictly African Dancing special, part of the BBC's Africa Lives season, she was ranked third by viewers. In 2009, she was paired with Ron Atkinson on Celebrity Wife Swap. Atkinson had previously resigned from his role as a television football commentator after making a racist remark about Marcel Desailly in 2004. The episode attracted 1.9 million viewers. In 2012, Sanderson appeared in "Billy's Olympic Nightmare", a BBC Red Button episode of soap opera EastEnders,

== Appearances ==
=== Television and radio ===
Tessa Sanderson's television and radio appearances (on UK TV, unless otherwise noted)
Year	Programme	Role	Ref
1979	The Superstars: The Women's Championship	participant	
1979	A Question of Sport	participant	
1979	We Were the Champions	interviewee	
1982	We Are the Champions	guest	
1983	Speak Out	guest	
1984	Pot the Question	participant	
1984	Punchlines	participant	
1984	The Saturday Picture Show	guest	
1984	Crackerjack	guest	
1984	Bullseye	participant	
1984	The Krypton Factor Olympic Celebrity Special	participant	
1984	I've Got a Secret	guest	
1985	Blankety Blank	guest	
1986	Tessa Sanderson	participant	
1987	Sporting Triangles (2 episodes)	participant	
1987	The Grand Knockout Tournament	participant	
1987	Through the Keyhole	participant	
1988	Which School and Why?	participant	
1988	Sporting Triangles (3 episodes)	cast member	
1989	Special Awards Presentation	participant	
1989	Sunday Sunday	guest	
1989	Sky News	sports reporter	
1989	Celebrity Wheel of Fortune	participant	
1989	Grand Final	participant	
1989	Tessa Sanderson	subject	
1990	Afternoon	participant	
1990	Telethon – Thanks to You	participant	
1990	Bullying	participant	
1990	On the Line	participant	
1991	Get Up, Stand Up	participant	
1991	Busman's Holiday Celebrity Special	participant	
1991	Visions	participant	
1991	Catchphrase Celebrity Special	participant	
1992	TV Squash	guest	
1992	This Is Your Life	subject	
1992	Surprise Surprise (3 episodes)	host	
1993	Cyberzone	host	
1993	Benn V Eubank: Round One – The Best of Enemies	guest	
1993	Inside Info	participant	
1993	Celebrity Squares	guest	
1993	The Real McCoy	participant	
1993	Going for Gold (Note: Programme about the likelihood of Manchester hosting the 2000 Olympics, not Going for Gold.)	presenter	
1993	Cluedo (episode: The Hanged Man)	participant	
1993	Big Break Christmas Special	guest	
1994	Capital Woman	presenter	
1995	They Think It's All Over	participant	
1996	Win, Lose or Draw	participant	
1996	Noel's Telly Years	participant	
1996	Sunday Matters	participant	
1996	Desert Island Discs (radio)	guest	
1997	Ha Bloody Ha	participant	
1997	Night Fever – Abba Special	participant	
1999	h&p@bbc	participant	
2002	The Essential...Daley Thompson	participant	
2003	Russell Grant's Sporting Scandals	participant	
2005	Trisha Goddard (2 episodes)	participant	
2005	Big Brother's Little Brother	guest	
2005	The Wright Stuff	panellist	
2006	Strictly African Dancing	participant	
2006	The Wright Stuff	panellist	
2007	What the World Thinks of God	guest	
1999	Antiques Roadshow	participant	
2009	Celebrity Wife Swap	participant	
2010	Cash in the Celebrity Attic	participant	
2010	Celebrity MasterChef	participant	
2011	Celebrity Eggheads	participant	
2012	Celebrity Antiques Road Trip	participant	
2012	EastEnders: Billy's Olympic Nightmare	herself	
2012	A Question of Sport	participant	
2012	Dotun Adebayo (radio)	participant	
2012	Dancing on Ice Goes Gold	participant	
2015	Who's Doing the Dishes?	participant	
2016	Pointless Celebrities	participant	
2015	All Star Mr & Mrs	participant	
2016	Pointless Celebrities (2 episodes)	participant	
2016	A Question of Sport	participant	
2019	The Junk Food Experiment	participant	
2016	Tenable All Stars	participant	
2018	Celebrity 5 Go Barging	participant	
2019	Sink Or Swim For Stand Up To Cancer	participant	
2020	Bargain Hunt: Newmarket 31 (Sport Relief Special)	participant	
2021	Celebrity River Cruising in France	participant	

=== Pantomime ===
Pantomime appearances by Tessa Sanderson
Year	Title	Role	Venue	Ref
1990–91	Robinson Crusoe	Girl Friday	Yvonne Arnaud Theatre, Guildford	
1991–92	Aladdin	The Genie	Brighton Dome	
1994–95	Robinson Crusoe	Girl Friday	Pavilion Theatre, Bournemouth	
1995–96	Cinderella	Fairy Godmother	Lewisham Theatre	
