= Pro Boxing (video game) =

1985 video game

- Developer(s): Artworx
- Publisher(s): Artworx
- Release: 1985
- Genre(s): Fighting game

Pro Boxing is a 1985 video game published by Artworx.

== Gameplay ==
Pro Boxing is a game in which the player challenges the computer or another player using boxers with equal capabilities.

== Reception ==
Rick Teverbaugh reviewed the game for Computer Gaming World, and stated that "For those of you who aren't really sure whether boxing on a computer is for you, this is an inexpensive way to find out. I think you'll like it."
