= Beach Blanket Volleyball =

1986 video game

- Developer: Artworx
- Publisher: Artworx
- Programmer: Walter Denny La Croix
- Platform: Commodore 64
- Release: 1986
- Genre: Sports

Beach Blanket Volleyball is a sports video game written by Walter Denny La Croix for the Commodore 64. It was published in 1986 by Artworx.

== Gameplay ==
Beach Blanket Volleyball is a game in which a team of three volleyball players compete against a human or computer opponent.

== Reception ==
Rick Teverbaugh reviewed the game for Computer Gaming World, and stated that "Graphics [...] aren't spectacular, at least on the Commodore versions I tested. But they do a good enough job to make playing the game smooth and simple."
