= Phantom King =

Phantom King may refer to:

- Phantom King (light novel) is a light novel written by Korean writer Rim Dal Yeong.
- Phantom Evil King is a boss in the 2001 video game Okage: Shadow King.
