= Check Man =

1982 video game

- Japanese arcade flyer
- Developer: Zilec-Zenitone
- Publishers: JP: Jaleco; UK: Zilec-Zenitone
- Platform: Arcade
- Release: JP: June 1982; EU: September 1982
- Genre: Puzzle
- Modes: Single-player, multiplayer

Check Man is a 1982 puzzle video game developed and published by Zilec-Zenitone for arcades. It was released in Japan by Jaleco in June 1982 and in the United Kingdom in September 1982. The game uses the Namco Galaxian arcade board. Developed with the involvement of the Stamper brothers, it was one of the first British video games to be successful in overseas markets, particularly Japan.

== Gameplay ==
The screen is broken up into 14 x 13 tiles or checks. When the player passes over the tiles, they disappear so each tile can only be walked over once per level. Some tiles are taken up by skull and crossbones which kill the player if walked into. The skulls turn to time bombs one at a time and the player must walk over them to defuse them before they explode. They must avoid the skulls and make sure they do not block off a possible future route by circling it. Some tiles are also flags which can be collected for bonus points. When all skulls have turned to bombs and been defused, the level is complete and begins again at a harder level. As the game develops, stomping boots are introduced that move around the playing area. These are also deadly to the player.

== Legacy ==
There were no official ports to home systems but Check Man was cloned as Danger UXB (Micro Power) for the Acorn Electron and BBC Micro, Timebomb (CDS Microsystems) for the ZX Spectrum, Gridtrap for the Commodore 64, and Kick It (Aackosoft) for MSX.
