= Magic Meanies =

1983 video game

- Publisher: CDS Micro Systems
- Platform: ZX Spectrum
- Release: 1983
- Genre: Action

Magic Meanies is a ZX Spectrum video game developed and released by CDS Micro Systems in 1983. Magic Meanies is a clone of Universal's Mr. Do! arcade game.

== Gameplay ==
Screenshot

The player, Meltec the Wizard, digs tunnels to collect lumps of lead. To progress to the next screen, Meltec must also collect a wandering cherry and avoid roaming enemies. There are also apples embedded in the earth. Undermining these and allowing them to fall onto an enemy can kill it, or at least block a path.

== Reception ==
Crash magazine awarded Magic Meanies 58% in issue 2, criticizing the small, jerky graphics but highlighting the skill and quick thinking required. Sinclair User awarded only 3 out of 10. Your Spectrum gave a score of 23 out of 30, describing it as one of the better games of this type.
