= Multi-Player Soccer Manager =

1991 video game

- ZX Spectrum screenshot
- Developer: John Atkinson
- Publisher: D&H Games
- Platforms: ZX Spectrum, Commodore 64, Amstrad CPC, Amiga, Atari ST
- Release: 1991
- Genre: Traditional football simulation
- Modes: Single-player, multiplayer

Multi-Player Soccer Manager is football management computer game released for the ZX Spectrum, Amiga, Commodore 64, Amstrad CPC and Atari ST in 1991.

== Gameplay ==
The player begins the game managing a Division 4 team and plays a 30-game season where the team must finish in the top two to gain promotion. If they finish bottom, the player wins the "league joker" trophy. In higher leagues, the bottom two teams are relegated to the lower division. If the player performs well as a manager, they may be offered a new club at a higher-level club. Players also compete in League Cup and FA Cup matches as well.

Other features include buying and selling players in the transfer market, organising training for the players and increase ground's capacity and safety. If the player runs out of money, they will be sacked and offered the job of the bottom team of Division 4. If they choose not to take the job, the game will reset, and the same occurs if the player resigns at any time.

Up to four players can take part at the same time with all players starting at Division 4. The Amiga and PC versions had up to eight players.

A common bug in the game was the dreaded 'Sleigh Bogey', which appeared at seemingly random points during seasons. It would appear when the players are viewing results for a game. If 'Sleigh Bogey' appeared, it is game over, and the players cannot continue the game. Also of note was that if the players over loaded on midfielders, their team would be more likely to win.
