= Colossus Bridge 4 (video game) =

1986 video game

- Developer: CDS Micro Systems
- Publisher: CDS Micro Systems
- Designer: Chris Birkenshaw
- Platforms: Amstrad CPC, BBC Micro, Commodore 64, ZX Spectrum
- Release: 1986
- Genre: Card game
- Mode: Single-player

Colossus Bridge 4 is a video game published by CDS Micro Systems, in 1986 for the ZX Spectrum and Amstrad CPC, in 1987 for the Commodore 64, and in 1988 for the BBC Micro. The game was packaged with a book, Begin Bridge by Geoff Fox.

== Gameplay ==
Colossuss Bridge 4 allows a single player to play contract bridge with a computer-controlled partner and opponents. Published on cassette tape, one side contains a tutorial programme that introduces a beginner player to the fundamentals of bridge, while the other side contains the main game.

== Reception ==
Crash magazine's review of the ZX Spectrum version presented a range of opinions. The first reviewer found the game to be "easy to get into", noting the amount of information on the screen. The second reviewer was familiar with bridge, and found the computer players to be too weak, allowing the player to "get away with inaccurate bidding", but otherwise found the game to be "highly polished". The third reviewer was unfamiliar with bridge found the tutorial too "fiddly" and was left "none the wiser" for the main game.

Similarly, Amtix magazine's review of the Amstrad version offered a range of opinions: one reviewer new to bridge could not understand the game, while others felt it was a good package for beginners and experienced players. The main criticism was "the abandon options which are not error trapped – press them once and that's it, kablewy!". An overall score of 75% was awarded with the comment that the game was "the best bridge player on the market".

Computer Gamer magazine reviewed the Spectrum and Amstrad version, praising the game's presentation and the ability to replay or rebid a hand. The computer player was noted as being "at best average", suitable for a beginner player but no challenge for an experienced one. An overall score of 65% was awarded.
