= Alex Kasper =

American cybersecurity educator, producer, and entrepreneur

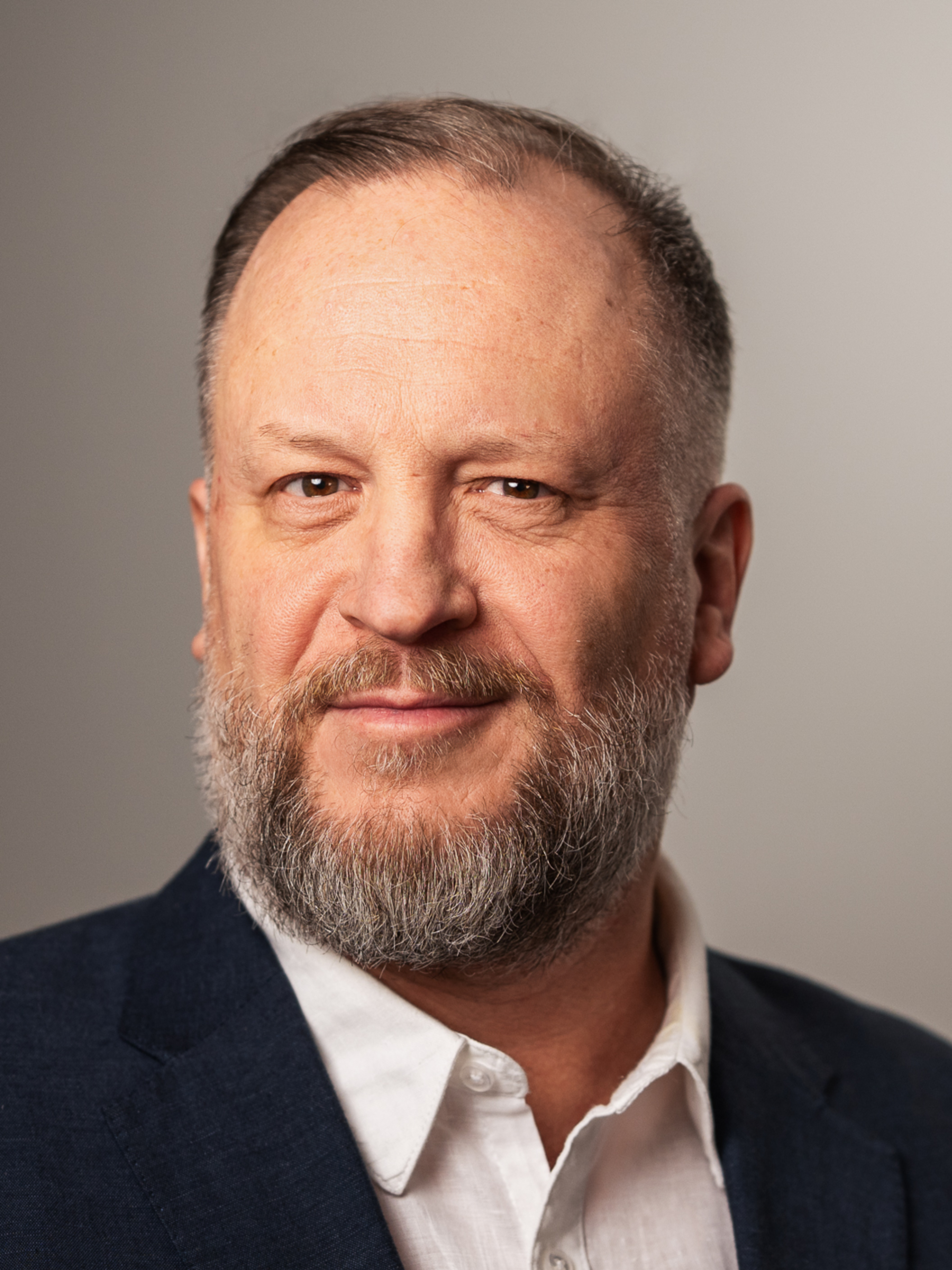
- Born: Alexis C Kasperavičius; April 14, 1968 (age 58); Cleveland, Ohio, U.S.
- Occupations: Entrepreneur; cybersecurity educator; video game producer

Alex Kasper (born Alexis C Kasperavičius; April 14, 1968) is an American entrepreneur, cybersecurity educator, and video game producer. He is known for producing the 1995 video game Return Fire and for co-founding the security consultancy Defensive Thinking with Kevin Mitnick.

== Early life ==
Kasper was born in Cleveland, Ohio, and raised in Los Angeles, California. As a teenager, he developed an interest in telephones and communications systems and later studied French horn performance at the University of Southern California.

== Career ==
=== Return Fire ===
From 1993 to 1995, Kasper produced Return Fire, a vehicular combat video game developed by Silent Software for the 3DO Interactive Multiplayer. In addition to producing the game, he served as sound designer and music supervisor.

Return Fire received critical acclaim and won the 3DO Two-Player Game of the Year award in 1995.

=== Defensive Thinking ===
According to a 2005 profile in Wired, Kasper was involved in the Southern California hacking community during the 1980s and 1990s. He was later described by Kevin Mitnick as a longtime friend and collaborator in the memoir Ghost in the Wires. Following Mitnick's release from prison, Kasper and Mitnick co-founded Defensive Thinking, a Los Angeles-based security consultancy focused on social engineering awareness and prevention.

According to The Wall Street Journal, the company provided training programs for corporations, government agencies, and military organizations, including the U.S. Air Force and Marines. Kasper and Mitnick also developed the Certified Social Engineering Prevention Specialist (CSEPS) program, a professional certification and training program focused on defense against social engineering attacks.

=== Radio ===
Kasper and Mitnick co-hosted The DarkSide of the Internet, a weekly technology-oriented radio program broadcast on KFI-AM 640 in Los Angeles.
