= Brian Clough's Football Fortunes =

1987 video game

- Publisher: CDS Micro Systems
- Platforms: Amiga, Amstrad CPC, Amstrad PCW, Atari 8-bit, Atari ST, BBC Micro, Commodore 16, Plus/4, Commodore 64, MS-DOS, Acorn Electron, MSX, ZX Spectrum
- Release: 1987
- Genre: Sports
- Modes: Single-player, multiplayer

Brian Clough's Football Fortunes is a sports video game featuring English football player Brian Clough. It was published in 1987 by CDS Micro Systems for the Amiga, Amstrad CPC, Amstrad PCW, Atari 8-bit computers, Atari ST, BBC Micro, Commodore 16, Plus/4, Commodore 64, MS-DOS, Acorn Electron, MSX, and ZX Spectrum.

== Reception ==
Reception

Award
Publication	Award
Your Sinclair	YS Megagame

Paul Rixon for Page 6 said: "C'mon CDS, you can do better than this. A great package but what about the program to go with it?"

Your Commodore said: "Full marks must go to CDS software for their packaging of Brian Clough's Football Fortunes: the 'funny money', the cards, the board and the instructions all come together to make an excellent package – perhaps not family entertainment, but a great way to amuse your friends for an evening".

Chris Holmes for Amiga Computing said: "It's simple, it under-uses the Amiga and it is great".

Niels Reynolds for Apple User said: "The balance achieved is just right, making for a great family game – and no crowd trouble".

Warren Lapworth for The Games Machine said: "A lot more of a board game than a computer one, Brian Clough's Football Fortunes will appeal to football fans and casual kick-about players alike".

Terry Pratt for Sinclair User said: "It's not that this computer moderated game is a particularly dire example of the various footballing games going the rounds, but it's very expensive, irritatingly fiddly (with its cards and counters), impossibly to play on your own and definitely not championship material".

Richard Bellis for Acorn User said: "Overall, Brian Clough's Football Fortunes is a game that is fun to play, with clear instructions, in a smart box. It leaves the fun bits to you and does the tedious bits itself".

Computer Gamer said: "Even if you already own one of the many other simulations, this game has many differing challenges through its revolutionary presentation. A great game which could so easily have been unbeatable".
