= Pool (video game) =

1983 video game

- Publishers: CDS Micro Systems, Elite Systems
- Programmer: Mike Lamb
- Platform: ZX Spectrum
- Release: 1983
- Genre: Sports
- Modes: Single-player, multiplayer

Pool is a 1983 video game written by Mike Lamb and published by CDS Micro Systems for the 16K ZX Spectrum. It was re-released in 1986 on the Elite Systems budget label, 2.99 Classics and again on CDS's Blue Ribbon label in 1988.

== Gameplay ==
In Pool, the table begins with six balls (three red and three blue), and each player gets three shots with the white ball. The goal is to pot all six balls. The cue ball is aimed by moving a target around the edge of the table and setting the strength of the shot. The number of shots remaining decreases for each shot made unless a ball is potted, upon which it is restored to three. Blue balls are worth 20 points, and red balls 10 points.

== Reception ==
In Crash magazine's review, the reviewers noted that balls moved "accurately and smoothly" with "convincing" rebounds. It was considered to be the best Spectrum version of arcade pool and awarded an overall score of 77%. Your Sinclair rated Pool 6 out of 10, finding it was "not the most imaginative of realisations" but "a pleasure to find a game where Euclid is of more use than blood-lust and whizzo reflexes".

Home Computing Weekly gave the game 5 stars, saying "this is not the game I spent my misplaced youth on, but it's pretty close, and a good game too." However, they were less happy with the game's graphics.

The full price release Pool reached number 8 in the MRIB all-formats chart in 1984 and the Blue Ribbon budget release appeared at number 6 in the Gallup ZX Spectrum chart in 1988.
