= French is Fun =

1983 video game

- Publisher(s): CDS Micro Systems
- Platform(s): ZX Spectrum
- Release: 1983
- Genre(s): Educational

French is Fun is an educational tool for the ZX Spectrum developed and published by CDS Micro Systems in 1983.

Screenshot

Screenshot

== Usage ==
French is Fun teaches some basic words and phrases. The user selects a topic ("the house", "the countryside", "the beach", "the street", "the school", "the cafe", "numbers" or "time") and then a mode of learning. Each mode provides some combination of pictures, phrases and tests.

== Reception ==
Sinclair User: "The test consists of filling in the word required, with the computer accepting only the letters it is expecting. Unfortunately, the computer's spelling of French is not entirely reliable and some of the words in its vocabulary are unusual, to say the least. These are faults in what might otherwise have been an entertaining and instructive program".

Crash: "The program contains a lot of quite attractive graphics, some with simple animations, and it will obviously be valuable for young French beginners as well as adult starters. It won't however, do much for your pronunciation!"

== Other titles ==
CDS published similar programmes in the same range: German is Fun, Italian is Fun and Spanish is Fun, all with the same format.
