= Spectrum Safari =

1983 video game

- Original release cover
- Developer: A.J. Rushton
- Publisher: CDS Micro Systems
- Platform: ZX Spectrum
- Release: 1983: Self-published; 1984: CDS Micro Systems
- Genre: Action

Spectrum Safari is a ZX Spectrum video game developed and self-released by A.J. Rushton in 1983. The game was soon signed by CDS Micro Systems who reissued it in early 1984 with a new cover and loading screen.

Its cassette inlay simply read: "Can you lead your party of three away from the dangers of the Island of Death, or will you be beaten by the horrific creatures that inhabit the island, who thirst for your blood with every step you take? Only the fittest will survive".

== Summary ==
In Spectrum Safari, the players have to take a party of stranded explorers across an island infested with highly intelligent wildlife with university degrees, and beset with natives who want to barter away their food and men to replace that eaten by the men or the intelligent wildlife. Once they have visited a village it disappears forever, but it teaches a caution in the bargaining, if the players get short of explorers (lives) in the party. Losing them all means death to the player. The main object is to find the only boat, buy it and sail away from this Magnus Magnusson madhouse. Every animal encountered has some problem; sometimes it is an arcade style situation, sometimes they want to know the answer to a difficult mathematical problem. If the players fail a member their party gets eaten.

Screenshot

Screenshot

== Reception ==
Your Spectrum opined: "This is a collection of bad 'magazine type' programs thrown together, with less than spectacular graphics and an average choice of colours. And because it's written in BASIC, it's not particularly fast".

Conversely, Crash wrote: "Nice clear graphics and a veritable MGM musical score makes this a very enjoyable game. Recommended".
