= IMSA World Championship Racing =

Unreleased prototype video game

- Splash screen
- Developer: Studio 3DO
- Publisher: Studio 3DO
- Producer: Greg Richardson
- Designer: Ed Rotberg
- Programmer: Chuck Sommerville
- Artist: Michael VaVerka
- Engine: MCRE (Mark Cerny's Rendering Engine)
- Platform: Panasonic M2
- Release: Unreleased (Prototype July 26, 2010)
- Genre: Racing
- Mode: Single-player

IMSA World Championship Racing (Note: Also known as World Championship Racing and IMSA Racing.) is an unreleased sports prototype racing video game that was in development and planned to be published by Studio 3DO on a scheduled fall 1997 release date exclusively for the Panasonic M2. Had it been released before the launch of the console was cancelled, it would have become the first officially licensed title by the International Motor Sports Association (IMSA) and one of the first titles to be launched before the system it was designed for.

In the game, players compete against other racers across multiple tracks in order to finish in first place and advance to the next course. Directed and designed by Atari veteran Ed Rotberg of Battlezone and Star Wars fame, IMSA World Championship Racing originated as a demo that was showcased at E3 1995 and spent two years in development before the launch of the M2 was aborted by Panasonic due to unwillingness in competing against other fifth generation consoles released during the period, leaving the game unpublished as a result.

Despite IMSA World Championship Racing never being officially released to the public by Studio 3DO, an ISO image of the nearly completed game was leaked online in 2010 with permission from one of the original developers of the project by a community member of the 3DO Zone forums, making it the only M2 title intended for home consoles to be made available as of date.

== Gameplay ==
Gameplay screenshot from the released beta build

IMSA World Championship Racing is a sports prototype racing game similar to Gran Turismo, where the player must maneuver a car to compete against artificially intelligent opponents on various race tracks set across countries such as United States and Japan. The game features various modes to choose from such as Arcade Mode, where the player can freely choose the courses they wish to race on, alongside the option of adjusting other settings such as weather conditions, number of laps and more.

At the main menu screen before starting a race, the player can choose an array of options such as automatic or manual transmission, control settings, types of tires, and other settings for the car. During gameplay, the player can also choose between different camera view by pressing one of the buttons on the controller. In addition to the main game, there are also hidden easter eggs such as a car-themed vertically scrolling shooter minigame, among other secrets.

== History ==
The M2 hardware, which was co-designed by Dave Needle and RJ Mical, was first announced as an add-on chip intended for the 3DO Interactive Multiplayer platform using a custom PowerPC microprocessor, however the project eventually became a standalone console and was exhibited and demonstrated during the Electronic Entertainment Expo 1995 in May. During the conference, a pre-rendered futuristic racing tech demo created by Team 3DO was showcased to demonstrate the system's capabilities to the video game press and attendees. Four months later, it was revealed that Studio 3DO were working on a formula one racing game for the M2, becoming one of the first projects to be officially announced for the upcoming system along with ClayFighter 63⅓, Descent and Iron & Blood: Warriors of Ravenloft, but not much information was given about the title afterwards.

In 1996, more information about the game was divulged on magazines such as 3DO Magazine, which now listed the game under the name IMSA Racing as one of the upcoming launch titles for the system alongside other projects in development such as D2 and an action role-playing game called Power Crystal, in addition of revealing that the project was developed from the demo that was previously featured at E3 1995. The M2 itself, however, failed to make an appearance during E3 1996, with one spokesperson representing Panasonic at the show stating that they were still undecided on how to use the M2 technology and that it was no longer certain that they would be using it as a video game platform, despite the company still retaining rights of the technology. Later in 1996, it was reported that Studio 3DO were working on several games for the platform including IMSA Racing.

In 1997, despite the M2 still not having a concrete release date and planned marketing strategy, video game magazines featured the game in a playable state, now under the title World Championship Racing and listed for a Fall 1997 release date and despite reassurance by Panasonic that the console was still on schedule to be released. The company cancelled the project in mid-1997 and stated that systems such as the PlayStation and Nintendo 64, in addition of believing that the system would not have been revolutionary against other upcoming consoles were reasons for its discontinuation and left the game unreleased as a result. The technology intended for the M2, however, was repurposed for a variety of devices. Following the cancellation of the M2, Studio 3DO began reworking the game for PC. However, this iteration of the game was also never released.

=== Development ===
The creation of IMSA World Championship Racing was spearheaded by lead designer and Atari veteran Ed Rotberg, who previously worked on multiple arcade games such as Battlezone and Star Wars. Chuck Sommerville, who is also best known for his works such as Snake Byte and Chip's Challenge, acted as the game's lead programmer. Former BioWare and Pandemic Studios CEO Greg Richardson also acted as producer of the project. The game runs at 30 frames per second, while the visuals are displayed at a 640x480 resolution.

Alex Werner, who worked as one of the artists for the project, recounted more about the game's development process in a thread at the 3DO Zone forums. Alex explained that both the driving and physics engines featured in the game were derived from Hard Drivin'. The graphics engine, MCRE (Mark Cerny's Rendering Engine, nicknamed "Mercury"), was created by external developer Mark Cerny and sold to The 3DO Company.

Alex also stated that prior to working on the project, he wrote a two-dimensional shooter as a demo for M2 developers to showcase the system's 2D capabilities and was later included as a hidden easter egg on the game.

== Release ==
On July 26, 2010, a nearly complete build of IMSA World Championship Racing was leaked online by community member NikeX at the 3DO Zone forums with permission from artist Alex Werner, one of the original developers of the project after the previous prototype owner that was originally tasked by Alex to release it, WindowsKiller, refused to do so. In order to be played, interactive kiosks and multimedia players containing M2 technology such as the FZ-21S and FZ-35S are required. The Konami M2 arcade system board, which was used in titles such as Battle Tryst and Evil Night, is incompatible as the software can only be played on hardware intended for home users.

== Reception ==
David Hodgson of GameFan previewed the game prior to the launch of the system being cancelled and praised various aspects such as the graphics, audio and overall presentation. Ultra Game Players noted its level of attention to detail. Likewise, French magazine Joypad also gave praise to its visuals.

== See also ==
- Sports Car GT, another game developed at the time intended to be IMSA officially licensed
