= Centerfold Squares =

1988 erotic video game

- Amiga European box art
- Developer: Artworx
- Publishers: Artworx; CDS Software (EU); Proein S.A (Spain)
- Designer: Douglas McFarland
- Programmers: Amiga; Douglas McFarland; Atari ST; Couchman; DOS; Hill
- Artist: Douglas McFarland
- Platforms: Amiga, Atari ST, DOS
- Release: 1988
- Genre: Puzzle
- Mode: Single-player

Centerfold Squares, retitled Centrefold Squares in Europe, is an erotic puzzle game originally developed and self-published by Artworx and released in 1988 for the Amiga, Atari ST and DOS. The game is a variation of Reversi where rectangular sections of an image of a nude model are revealed as the player earns points. Centrefold Squares was published by CDS Software in Europe, and published by Proein S.A under the original American title in Spain.

== Gameplay ==
As the player earns points, sections of an asymmetric rectangular grid are removed, revealing sections of a nude model.

The game is played on a 10×10 grid. Red squares cause the player to lose points, and green squares award points.

Centerfold Squares is a variation of reversi referred to as 'Double-Up' that is played on a ten by ten grid; four counters of two opposing colors are placed in the center in a two by two alternating pattern. The game is played against an AI of varying difficulty, and each player takes turns placing counters on the board next to an existing counter, and if a player surrounds an opposing counter with two counters of their own color, that counter then becomes their color. Centerfold Squares has special squares in the grid, which activate different effects when a counter is placed on them: red squares subtract points, green squares give extra points, and yellow squares allow the player to take another turn. There is also a '???' button which takes up a player's turn in exchange for a random effect, such as large point changes or instant wins or losses. Points are earned through the player changing opposing counters to their color, and earning a set number of points (determined at the beginning of the round) will win the game. The points are then used to remove one of the black tiles covering a digitized image of a nude model - each tile has a set number of points required to remove it. If the AI wins, an already revealed tile is covered up.

Centerfold Squares has twelve female model photos in the base game. An expansion disk with eleven additional model photos was released. Each photo is marked with the difficulty of the AI, and the difficulty is tied to the unlockable photo as opposed to being selected by the player. The available difficulty levels are Below Average, Average, and Above Average.

== Ports ==
Sound effects as well as a save feature are limited to the MS-DOS version. It supports CGA, EGA, and Tandy Graphics Adapter modes. The Amiga version may be launched from the workbench. The Atari ST supports the use of a second disk drive to run both game disks at once.

== Development ==
Centerfold Squares was retitled Centrefold Squares in Europe, and published by CDS Software. Centerfold Squares was published by Proein S.A in Spain. The Amiga version of Centerfold Squares was released around April 1988.

Centerfold Squares' digitized nude graphics were originally digitized in black and white, specifically 16 levels of grey, and subsequently colored digitally in a process referred to as 'Digitized Plus'. Doug McFarland, Centerfold Squares' designer, stated that camera filters were used "to achieve better contrast", and in addendum to the images being colored digitally, "all edges are retouched to eliminate any aliasing effects. The results are more vibrant colors, superior to conventional color digitizing." Centerfold Squares was originally planned to have ten female and two male models, but this was cancelled before release in lieu of twelve female models. All ports of Centerfold Squares cost US$29.95 in 1988, and 'around 65-70' Deutschmark. The DOS version of Centerfold Squares cost 2250 Spanish peseta in 1990.

== Reception ==
Reception

Review scores
Publication	Score
Amstrad Sinclair Ocio	8/10 (DOS)
Génération 4	70% (Amiga)
.info	3/5 (Amiga)
Power Play	6% (DOS)

In a 1991 article covering the history of adult computer games by VideoGames & Computer Entertainment, Centerfold Squares was given as an example of adult games making use of advances in hardware capability; they stated that "Centerfold Squares began to rival newsstand men's magazines in eye appeal. A big reason more companies are now publishing sexy games is that the machines can finally generate the complex images needed to depict romance and sexuality."

Ahoy! reviewed the Amiga version of Centerfold Squares in an August 1988 issue, expressing that the game's sexual content is 'tasteful' as compared to other adult games, stating that "Bad taste and bad graphics, twin hobgoblins of "adult" computer games, are avoided by Centerfold Squares." Ahoy! praised Centerfold's graphics, calling them "a quantum leap ahead of any competing product", and expressed that the models in the game are attractive, stating that "The luminous skin tones, expressive faces, and physical beauty of the models is unimpeachable." Ahoy! praised Centerfold's gameplay, but criticized the lack of a save feature, particularly due to the length of each match. Ahoy! summarized Centerfold Squares as "everything one could expect from an adult computer game. It is pretty, sexy, and fun to play."

.info gave the Amiga version of Centerfold Squares an overall score of three stars out of five, criticizing the gameboard's graphics as "adequate but basic", as well as the game's nude models, stating that "frankly there are sharper and crisper Amiga digitized nudes in the public domain." .info noted Centerfold's AI opponents as 'challenging', and praised the game's gameplay as "a pleasant enough diversion."

German gaming magazine Power Play gave the DOS version of Centerfold Squares an overall score of 6%, being heavily critical of the game and calling it "a "look-at-my-EGA-digitized-boobs"-game of the stupidest sort"; they furthermore said it was 'boring', and called it "as exciting as a government meeting."

Spanish gaming magazine Amstrad Sinclair Ocio gave the DOS version of Centerfold Squares an overall score of eight out of ten, criticizing the difficulty of the game's AI opponents, but praising the game's 'addictive' gameplay and 'strong incentive to win' through the revealing of squares. Ocio praised Centerfold Squares' "magnificent digitized graphics" as its best feature, expressing that they "employ a great sense of realism", but criticized the game's sound as being "limited to a few beeps". Ocio praised the DOS version's save feature, and overall summarized the game as "magnificent".

French gaming magazine Génération 4 gave the Amiga version of Centerfold Squares an overall score of 70%, praising its "original" gameplay but criticizing the length of each game due to the player losing progress through the AI re-covering revealed squares. Génération 4 praised Centerfold Squares' "beautiful" digitized graphics.
