= Return Fire =

1995 video game

- Original 3DO cover art
- Developer: Silent Software
- Publishers: 3DO: NA/EU: Prolific Publishing; JP: The 3DO Company; PlayStation: NA: Time Warner Interactive; EU: Warner Interactive Europe; Windows: NA: GT Interactive
- Director: Reichart Kurt von Wolfsheild
- Producer: Alexis Kasperavičius
- Designer: Reichart Kurt von Wolfsheild
- Programmer: William A. Ware
- Artist: Van Arno
- Series: Return Fire
- Platforms: 3DO; Microsoft Windows; PlayStation
- Release: 3DO: NA: 1995; JP: 14 July 1995; EU: 22 December 1995; PlayStation: NA: 12 April 1996; EU: 1 September 1996; Windows: NA: 17 August 1996
- Genres: Action, shooter
- Modes: Single-player, multiplayer

Return Fire is a 1995 video game developed by Silent Software, Inc. originally for the 3DO and later ported to Microsoft Windows and the PlayStation in 1996. It is a sequel to Fire Power (1987) and was followed by Return Fire 2 (1998). An expansion pack, Return Fire: Maps O' Death, was released for the 3DO in 1995. Return Fire is a vehicular shooter from a 3D bird's eye view, in which the player's goal is to capture the enemy flag and return with it to their base. It was met with critical acclaim for its unusual gameplay concept, enjoyable multiplayer mode, and classical soundtrack.

== Gameplay ==
Return Fire has four specialized vehicles, each one with unique abilities. Each vehicle can carry a limited quantity of fuel and ammo (which can be refilled at ammo tents and fuel depots) and can withstand varying amounts of damage. If a land vehicle runs out of fuel, it stops and the driver jumps out and flees.

The helicopter is rather fragile and cannot resupply itself with fuel and ammunition unless it returns to the base, but can strafe at an angle and destroy mines and bridges. The tank (M60) has a 360° rotating turret. The Armoured Support Vehicle (ASV — M270 MLRS) is the most durable vehicle, but the slowest moving. It has the ability to lay mines which can instantly destroy any land vehicle. The jeep (M151 MUTT or HMMWV on PlayStation) is the fastest land vehicle and solely possesses the strategic ability to pick, move, and drop flags. Jeeps have the ability to over-inflate their tires and travel across deep water. They are the weakest vehicles, requiring only one hit to destroy.

Only rotating missile turrets and drones are a regular threat in single player mode. If the player exceeds the boundaries of the map, a submarine emerges and fires a heat-seeking missile against the player.

== Production ==
=== Audio ===
The game featured licensed orchestral recordings of public domain music from EMI Classics, with the label's logo displayed prominently during the startup sequence. According to Wolfsheild, this type of major label licensing and branding arrangement was uncommon for video games at the time: "I told them I would advertise them, I would put 'EMI' first image full page... video games didn't really do that back then." Each piece is associated with a specific vehicle or game event, and the game dynamically adjusts which portion of the work is played based on gameplay.

- Verdi's "Dies Irae" plays during the opening title screen as the logo appears engulfed in flames.
- Holst's "Mars, the bringer of war" serves as the tank's theme.
- Grieg's "In the Hall of the Mountain King" accompanies the Armored Support Vehicle.
- Wagner's "Ride of the Valkyries" accompanies the helicopter, in homage to Apocalypse Now.
- Handel's "Hallelujah Chorus" plays when the flag is exposed.
- Rimsky-Korsakov's "Flight of the Bumblebee" plays while driving the jeep.
- Rossini's "William Tell Overture" plays when the jeep captures the flag.
- Upon victory, the "and he shall reign forever and ever" section from Handel's "Hallelujah Chorus" plays over footage of ticker-tape parades.

When a player is killed, a laughing skull appears on screen. The voice of the skull was provided by RJ Mical, co-designer of the Amiga, Atari Lynx, and 3DO.

The game's audio was supervised by producer Alexis Kasperavičius, who also served as sound designer and music supervisor.

=== Video sequences ===
When a level is completed in the 3DO, PC or PlayStation version a short video clip is shown. One of these is a clip featuring Lou Gehrig's famous Luckiest Man on the Face of the Earth speech.

== Release ==
A version for the Sega Saturn was developed and finished, but never released, though a complete build of the port was leaked online in 2007. Reviews for the Saturn version were published shortly before its targeted release date of May 1997; most reviewers described it as an unacceptably poor conversion of an outstanding game, suffering from a much lower frame rate than the 3DO and PlayStation versions. Another version of the game was also in development by Alexandria Inc. for the Atari Jaguar CD, but development on the port was terminated sometime in 1995 and it was never released for unknown reasons.

The PlayStation release of Return Fire was the final game release by Time Warner Interactive before it was absorbed into Williams Entertainment (later became Midway Home Entertainment) by its new owners WMS Industries.

== Reception ==
Reception

Review scores
| Publication | Score |
|---|---|
| AllGame | 4/5 |
| Computer and Video Games | 90/100 |
| Edge | 8/10 |
| Electronic Gaming Monthly | 9/10, 9/10, 7/10, 7/10 |
| EP Daily | 6/10 (Note: The Electric Playground provided scores of 6 out of 10 for single-player and 8.5 out of 10 for multiplayer.) |
| Game Informer | 8.5/10 |
| Game Players | 90% |
| GameFan | 85/10, 82/10, 92/100 |
| GamesMaster | 94% |
| Hyper | 83% |
| Next Generation | 4/5 |
| 3DO Magazine | 5/5 |
| Electronic Entertainment | 4/5 |
| Electronic Games | B+ |
| Games World | 90/100 |
| Ultimate Future Games | 92% |
| VideoGames | 10/10 |

Return Fire on the 3DO received generally favorable reception from critics. GamePro's Manny LaMancha described it as "a combination of the best parts of playing Capture the flag, Desert Strike, and Micro Machines". LaMancha complimented the easy-to-master controls, the graphics, and the strong sense of humor. Electronic Gaming Monthly's four reviewers gave it their "Game of the Month" award, applauding the two-player mode, classical soundtrack, graphics, and general fun of the game. Ed Semrad summarized "In an industry flooded with sports and fighting carts, this comes as a breath of fresh air". Next Generation praised the classical soundtrack and the two-player mode. They stated that the game is very fun even in single-player mode due to its large number of levels, and that the graphics and sound effects make causing destruction the in-game destruction more entertaining.

In 1995, Return Fire was awarded the "3DO Two-Player Game of the Year". In 1996, GamesMaster ranked the 3DO version as number 51 in their "Top 100 Games of All Time". In the same issue, they also ranked the 3DO version number one on their "The GamesMaster 3DO Top 10". In 1997, Electronic Gaming Monthly ranked the 3DO version number 63 on their "100 Best Games of All Time", citing its high replayability and the way it "capture[s] the frenetic feeling of combat" to an extent that few games do. They said they chose the 3DO version specifically because the gameplay was tighter than that of the PlayStation version and unreleased Saturn version.

=== Maps O' Death ===
Reception (Maps O' Death)

Review scores
| Publication | Score |
|---|---|
| Computer and Video Games | 80/100 |
| 3DO Magazine | 5/5 |
| Maximum | 4/5 |
| Ultimate Future Games | 84% |

The expansion pack, Return Fire: Maps O' Death, also received generally favorable reviews. Maximum said that, for an exceptionally low price tag, the player is treated to "horribly difficult theatres of war with less vehicles available and some decidedly odd scenery (such as the chessboard and SOS levels), all of which makes the Return Fire sequel an excellent 3DO addition". GamePro's Johnny Ballgame stated that it "breathes new life into the year-old game, offering more than 100 fresh levels filled with the carnage and insanity Fire fans love".

=== Other versions ===
Reception (Other versions)

Aggregate score
| Aggregator | Score | |
| Aggregator | PC | PS |
|---|---|---|
| GameRankings | 69% | N/A |

Review scores
| Publication | Score | |
| Publication | PC | PS |
|---|---|---|
| Computer Games Strategy Plus | 2.5/5 | N/A |
| Computer Gaming World | 3.5/5 | N/A |
| Computer and Video Games | 5/5 | 5/5 |
| Game Informer | N/A | 8.25/10 |
| Game Players | N/A | 83% |
| GameFan | N/A | 75/100, 70/100, 87/100 |
| GamesMaster | N/A | 81/100 |
| GameSpot | 4.7/10 | N/A |
| Hyper | 75/100 | N/A |
| IGN | N/A | 7/10 |
| Next Generation | N/A | 4/5 |
| PlayStation Official Magazine – UK | N/A | 7/10 |
| Intelligent Gamer | N/A | A- |
| PC Review | 8/10 | N/A |
| PlayStation Plus | N/A | 91/100 |
| PSX-Pro | N/A | 7/10 |
| VideoGames | N/A | 8/10 |

The PlayStation version was met with generally favorable reviews. GamePro's Johnny Ballgame called it "a brilliantly conceived thrill-a-minute war sim" and "an unprecedented blend of action and strategy". He cited the easy-to-learn controls and game mechanics, frenzied and enduring multiplayer action, and high level of visual detail. He also made special note of the game's classical soundtrack, saying that "Never before has sound been so instrumental to a game's success". Next Generation described it as a near-identical conversion of the 3DO game, and offered it similar praises.

The PC version received mixed reception from critics, holding a rating of 69% based on six reviews according to review aggregator GameRankings.
