= Winged Warlords =

1983 video game

- Developer: Mike Lamb
- Publisher: CDS Micro Systems
- Platform: ZX Spectrum
- Release: EU: 1983
- Genre: Action
- Modes: Single-player, 2 players

Winged Warlords is a ZX Spectrum video game which was published by CDS Microsystems in 1983. It is a clone of Joust in terms of level design and gameplay. The graphics are different, with the ostrich mounts being replaced with winged horses.

It was authored by Mike Lamb, who went on to write many Spectrum conversions of arcade games such as Arkanoid and Renegade.

== Gameplay ==
Presented with a 2D side-view arena with several platforms, the player maneuvers a pegasus-mounted warlord. Left and right movement is inertia-heavy, as is 'flap' movement against gravity. In one difference with the arcade version of Joust, the flap key may be held down rather than tapped.

Collision with a computer-controlled enemy results in one warlord being dismounted, depending on who had the altitudinal advantage. If the player is dismounted, he loses one of four lives. If the enemy is dismounted, the figure tumbles downwards as his mount flies away. This dismounted warlord may be attacked again for bonus points. If left unattended, the warlord eventually calls a new mount and re-enters the battle (coloured magenta instead of cyan). Occasionally the Winged Warlord equivalent of Joust's pterodactyl will appear; the Evil Bird of War (which appears to be some kind of large duck). Contact with this is lethal for the player and it must be avoided as it makes its way across the screen.

== Reception ==
CRASH magazine reviewed Winged Warlords in its third issue, awarding it 79%, while Sinclair User gave it 6/10, generally receiving better critical success than other Spectrum Joust clones such as Softek's Ostron.
