= Steve Davis Snooker =

1984 video game

- Commodore 64 box art
- Developer: CDS Software
- Publishers: CDS Software; Blue Ribbon Software; Entersoft
- Designer: Michael Lamb
- Platforms: Amstrad CPC, Amstrad PCW, Atari 8-bit, BBC Micro, Commodore 16, Plus/4, Commodore 64, Electron, Enterprise, Sinclair QL, ZX Spectrum
- Release: EU: 1984
- Genre: Sports (snooker)
- Modes: Single-player, multiplayer

Steve Davis Snooker is a 1984 sports video game developed and published by CDS Software. The budget release published by Blue Ribbon Software reached the top of the UK charts in May 1988. Steve Davis Snooker simulates the cue sport snooker. Released under licence from 6-time Snooker World Champion, Steve Davis.

The game is the first to feature a license of a professional snooker player, with later Jimmy White creating the Cueball series. CDS called the game the "ultimate successor" to their 1983 pool simulator, titled Pool. Davis would also be involved with the 1989 follow-up Steve Davis World Snooker, as well as 1996's Virtual Snooker.

== Gameplay ==
Steve Davis Snooker allows players to play against themselves or a human opponent in either Snooker or Pool. There is no opponent AI. The game is controlled by either a joystick or a keyboard. There are two: a short game (Ten-Red Snooker similar to power snooker) and a long game (traditional fifteen-red Snooker).

After potting a red ball, the player must nominate a colour (ZX Spectrum).

The Atari 8-bit computer box art boasts that the game has a "trick shot edit mode", "accurate spin", and "friction factor."

== Reception ==
Reception

Review scores
Publication	Score
Crash	77 (ZX Spectrum)
Sinclair User	7/10 (ZX Spectrum)
Zzap	79% (Commodore 64)
Commodore Format	70% (Commodore 64)
Commodore User	60% (Commodore 16, Plus/4)

Critical reception for the game was generally high, with Zzap! magazine scoring the Commodore 64 game at 79% commenting "Steve Davis Snooker is the best version of the sport I have ever seen on the 64, with its excellent approach and options helping make it so if you're a snooker fan or you want to try something different from your everyday shoot em up, then this makes a worthy and refreshing change." Commodore Format also mentioned the game in a review, scoring the game at 70% before stating that whilst Snooker was a "hideously dull game", the game was a "nice conversion."

Crash Magazine also reviewed the game for the ZX Spectrum, scoring the game at 77% saying "A very good, user-friendly simulation, which (possibly for the first time) really calls on skill." Sinclair User were also positive with the game, scoring the game at 7/10, but did cite the lack of a touching ball mechanic in game as an oversight.

Commodore User gave the game 60%, commenting that the game's developer were "too ambitious this time", commenting on the game's downgrade in the port from the Commodore 64 to the Commodore 16. However "If you're a dedicated afficionado [sic] then Steve Davis will no doubt appeal to you."

== Legacy ==
An updated version of the game would be released in 1989 for the Amiga and Atari ST, known as Steve Davis World Snooker. The game featured similar gameplay as that of the original, however, also included AI opponents, and improved graphical designs. The game also features additional modes, such as eight-ball and nine-ball pool, with billiards.
