= European Superleague =

1990 football sports management video game

- Developer: Matrix Developments
- Publisher: CDS Microsystems
- Platforms: Amiga, Amstrad CPC, Atari ST, IBM PC, ZX Spectrum
- Release: 1990
- Genre: Sports
- Modes: Single-player, multiplayer

European Superleague is a football sports management game released for the Amiga, Amstrad CPC 6128, Atari ST, IBM PC compatibles, and ZX Spectrum 128/+3 platforms. It was created by Matrix Developments and published in 1990 by CDS Microsystems.

== Gameplay ==
Up to eight players can manage one European team on one of three difficulty levels. The player's responsibilities are training, scouting, transfers, press speeches and team strategy.

Each team has 20 players with different skill that change throughout the season, so the player has to select the starter eleven for every match.
