= Xtreme Racing =

1995 video game

XTreme Racing
- Developer: Silltunna Software
- Publishers: Black Magic Software; CDS Software
- Designers: Alex Amsel; Richard Whittall
- Platform: Amiga (AGA required)
- Release: 1995
- Genre: Racing
- Modes: Single-player, multiplayer

XTreme Racing is a kart-style racing video game released in 1995 for the Amiga. The gameplay is heavily based on Super Mario Kart, released for the Super NES three years prior. Players select from one of 8 possible characters, each driving unique vehicles.

== Gameplay ==
XTreme Racing can be played by up to four players on one computer, or with up to 8 players via a null modem connection.

=== Single player ===
There are three Single Player modes available at the start of the game.

- The first is a Cup Mode, wherein the player can compete in one of 4 cups (2 more were added in the upgrade pack, bringing the total to 6). The cups usually contain 5 tracks of varying difficulty. The better position the players attain each race, the more points they acquire.
- The second is a Tournament Mode, in which players must not only strive to make it into at least first, second or third position each race, but in which they can also obtain money with which they can buy upgrades for their chosen car.
- The third mode is a standard Time Trial Mode, the aim of which being to attain as fast a time as possible on selected tracks without the distraction of other vehicles (the other two modes also log Lap Records). Lap Records are not automatically saved but rather must be saved by selecting the "Save Records" option on the Frontend Menu.

=== Multiplayer ===
As well as the Cup and Tournament Modes listed above, Multiplayer also includes a Versus Mode, wherein the players (and as many computer-controlled players as the players wish, if any) race head-to-head on the tracks of their choosing. The game also includes a Battle Mode similar to that in Super Mario Kart although actually more inspired by another Super NES game, Street Racer.

== Reception and legacy ==
With critical acclaim in Amiga gaming magazines, the game itself sold well on AGA machines, but not enough to justify a full sequel. This was due to the state of the Amiga market at the time (by comparison, Worms: The Directors Cut, a fairly high-profile release also with input from the programming team at Silltunna Software, only sold 5,000 when it was released in 1997).

In 1996 an upgrade pack, including additional tracks, bug fixes, new features and additional Cups to participate in, was made available to people who registered their copy of the game with the publisher. The upgrade pack also included a Map Editor, which a few people have used to produce brand new maps over the years. The upgrade pack, as well as many user-made maps, are now available on Aminet.

Xtreme Racing appeared as an almost full version on a magazine coverdisk, missing only some of the map graphics which were then made available for download on the Aminet.
