= Stellar Dawn =

- The Stellar Dawn logo
- Developer: Jagex
- Publisher: Jagex
- Platform: Java Platform
- Genre: Sci-fi MMORPG
- Mode: Multiplayer

Stellar Dawn is a browser-based sci-fi themed MMORPG that was under development by UK game developer Jagex but was never released.

Originally known as MechScape, the project was scrapped and renamed after it was decided that the completed project did not meet the standards of the original design brief. The project was overhauled and formally announced as Stellar Dawn on 14 July 2010 when Jagex released the official Stellar Dawn website. On 10 August 2010 the first official Stellar Dawn teaser was released.

The game was expected to be released in 2011, the ETA posted on the official website, however in March 2012, Jagex stated that the game's development would be paused for the time being.

On March 2, 2012, Jagex had stated that all development on Stellar Dawn had been "paused" so that 2012 could be their biggest year to date with the release of Transformers Universe and improvements on RuneScape. Jagex stated that they would review the status of the game after Transformers Universe was launched.

Stellar Dawn promotional concept art

== MechScape ==
In 2007 Jagex registered UK trademarks and various related domain names for the term MechScape.

At the 2008 E3 Media and Business Summit it was announced that Jagex were working on a new MMO to be called MechScape, expected in the first quarter of 2009. Henrique Olifiers, Lead Developer at the time, announced that it would be browser-based like RuneScape, but would be one or two steps beyond RuneScape HD's level of technology, that it would have a science fiction theme and that it would be aimed at an older audience.

In an interview with GamesIndustry.biz, then CEO Geoff Iddison stated that Jagex have "got a very, very big investment into another MMO" and that it was expected to be released "early next year, Q1 2009" - when asked if he was referring to MechScape, he replied "I can't say too much more, I'm afraid."

On 29 October 2009, Jagex CEO Mark Gerhard announced that MechScape had been cancelled prior to its release, describing the decision as costing "tens of millions of pounds."

As of 11 August 2015, Jagex Employee 'Mod Mat K' had stated on Reddit that "The official line is that it has been put on hold indefinitely.", furthermore he commented on the games mechanics "I remember playing an early version of it and was rather cool. You had a space ship which you did research and built components to make parts for your vehicle. A lander would take you down to the planet in your vehicle and you would blow stuff up. When you got to a settlement you would get out of your vehicle and walk around the settlement much like in Old School. I enjoyed it. It's a shame we can't put it out for people to look at - but we don't think it actually works anymore."

Much of the game, including its engine, was intended to be reused in Stellar Dawn, however everything in Stellar Dawn was reinvented with the exception of some concept art.

In an exclusive interview for a blog in 2009, developer Andrew Gower describes MechScape, saying "It's very much a game of exploration and discovery and has beautiful art direction and back-story which I'm not going to give away." Although this interview was conducted when MechScape was in development, it seems that this general idea would hold true for both MechScape and Stellar Dawn. Gower went on to describe a key difference between RuneScape and MechScape, which is likely going to be even more prominent in Stellar Dawn: "RuneScape grew very organically, whereas MechScape was created with the benefit of years of experience so is much more cohesive."
