= Sporting Triangles =

British game show

- Genre: Game show
- Presented by: Nick Owen (1987–88); Andy Craig (1989–90)
- Starring: Jimmy Greaves; Tessa Sanderson (1987–88); Andy Gray (1988–90); Emlyn Hughes (1989–90)
- Country of origin: United Kingdom
- Original language: English

Production
- Running time: 30 minutes (inc. adverts)
- Production company: Central

Original release
- Network: ITV
- Release: 7 January 1987 – 13 August 1990

Related
- A Question of Sport

Sporting Triangles is a British game show that aired on ITV from 7 January 1987 to 13 August 1990. It was originally hosted by Nick Owen for the first two series and then hosted by Andy Craig for the last two series.

== Transmission guide ==
- Series 1: 12 editions 7 January 1987 – 25 March 1987
- Series 2: 12 editions 7 January 1988 – 31 March 1988
- Series 3: 12 editions 19 April 1989 – 12 July 1989
- Series 4: 16 editions 12 April 1990 – 13 August 1990
- Special Christmas edition : 24 December 1987
- These are based on London transmission dates.

== Video game ==
A video game of the series was also published by CDS Micro Systems in 1989 for the Acorn Archimedes, Acorn Electron, Amstrad CPC, BBC Micro, Commodore 64, ZX Spectrum, and Amstrad PCW. The game received low to average scores across several magazines: Your Sinclair rated the game 40% whilst rival Spectrum magazine Crash gave it 48%, stating: "A mediocre conversion of a less than brilliant TV quiz and for sports fanatics only".
