= Blitzkrieg at the Ardennes =

1989 video game

- Developer: Command Simulations
- Publisher: Command Simulations
- Release: 1989

Blitzkrieg at the Ardennes is a 1989 video game published by Command Simulations.

== Gameplay ==
Blitzkrieg at the Ardennes is a game in which the Battle of the Bulge is simulated, focusing on the German offensive of December 1944.

== Reception ==
Robert A Hottin reviewed the game for Computer Gaming World, and stated that "this is a challenging game. It is easy to learn, stimulating to play and offers a reasonable simulation of some of the choices available to the respective Army commanders".
