= Fire Power (video game) =

1987 video game

- Developer: Silent Software
- Publisher: MicroIllusions
- Designer: Reichart Kurt von Wolfsheild
- Programmer: William A. Ware (Amiga)
- Platforms: Amiga, Apple IIGS, Commodore 64, MS-DOS
- Release: 1987: Amiga; 1988: MS-DOS; 1989: C64, Apple IIGS
- Genre: Multidirectional shooter
- Modes: Single-player, multiplayer

Fire Power (also Firepower) is a military-themed multidirectional shooter developed by Silent Software for the Amiga. It was published in 1987 by MicroIllusions. An MS-DOS port was released in 1988, followed by versions for the Apple IIGS and Commodore 64 in 1989. The player drives a tank through a large, scrolling landscape containing enemy bases. The goal is to capture the flag from inside each while rescuing prisoners of war and destroying the enemy's structures.

Two sequels were released: Return Fire and Return Fire 2.

== Gameplay ==
Fire Power can be played alone, against a human opponent on a split screen, or over a modem, which lets players to chat with each other while playing. A map editor allows creation of custom multiplayer experiences.

The player controls a tank through an expansive, outdoor landscape. Each map has at least two bases: one for the green team, and one for the yellow (red in the PC version) team. Initially, the base locations are hidden from the players, so an extensive search of the landscape had to be conducted first. Obstacles include enemy turrets, various fortifications, and destructible buildings. If the player stands still for too long (to set up an ambush, for instance), a series of enemy helicopters appear from off screen and attack. The helicopters can be shot down with the tank's main weapon.

=== Bases and tanks ===
Each base has several different types of buildings, such as armories, barracks, and bio-domes. The objective is to capture the flag from inside the enemy base by blasting through walls and destroying any defenses. The player can also rescue prisoners of war by destroying POW camps and allowing the captives to ride in the tank back to base. An extra tank life is rewarded for each fifteen POWs rescued.

Three different tanks are available: one is fast and fragile, one is slow but strong, and the third is rated in between the two. Each tank can carry a different amount of POWs. Capturing the enemy flag requires maneuvering the tank into the flag building and driving over the enemy flag to pick it up. Weapons cannot destroy garages.

The player's tank can run over enemy soldiers, crushing them with an accompanying "squish" sound effect and a bloody "splat" that remains on the battlefield for several minutes.

== Ports ==
Fire Power originated on the Amiga and was ported to MS-DOS, Commodore 64, and Apple IIGS. An Atari Lynx version was planned but development never started due to internal conflict with Epyx.

== Reception ==
Roy Wagner reviewed the game for Computer Gaming World, and stated that "I find Fire Power to be a fair priced design with exceptional presentation. In other words, it is a great shoot 'em up arcade wargame."

== Legacy ==
Fire Power spawned two sequels, Return Fire and Return Fire 2.
