= Iron & Blood: Warriors of Ravenloft =

1996 video game

- European PlayStation cover art
- Developer: Take-Two Interactive
- Publishers: Acclaim Entertainment; Take-Two Publishing
- Series: Ravenloft
- Platforms: MS-DOS, PlayStation
- Release: PlayStation; NA: October 3, 1996; PAL: November 1996; MS-DOS; NA: January 7, 1997
- Genre: Fighting
- Modes: Single-player, multiplayer

Iron & Blood: Warriors of Ravenloft is a 3D fighting game released for MS-DOS and PlayStation.

== Plot ==
Iron & Blood is set in the Ravenloft campaign setting for the Dungeons & Dragons fantasy role-playing game.

== Gameplay ==
Start of a fight between Torgo and Sasha (PlayStation version)

Players choose a hero or villain to control. The following table lists them close to the way they appear on the character selection screen:

Heroes	Villains
Red Cloud the Abber Nomad shaman; Shinesta the elf princess; Ignatius Max the halfling thief; Xenobia the amazon; Darius the gladiator; Erland the elven archer; Luthor the paladin; Torgo the dwarf	Urgo the margoyle; Ardrus the skeleton warrior; Sasha the werewolf; Nym Pymplee the mad goblin; Balthazaar the headsman; Kaurik the warlord; Balok the black knight; Stellerex the wizard

== Development ==
Iron & Blood: Warriors of Ravenloft was developed by Take-Two Interactive. Creator/producer Rick Hall stated, "There are a lot of big guns out there and we noticed everyone's games are martial arts-based, but there weren't any fantasy-based fighting games. I'm a big D&D fan, so I thought that would be fun."

The game was announced as an exclusive for the Panasonic M2 console under the title Ironblood. However, Take-Two Interactive later announced that the game would first be released for the PlayStation, with versions for the M2 and PC to come later. At this time they revealed that they had always intended the game to be a multiplatform release for Sega Saturn, PlayStation, and M2, and even started work on the PlayStation version first. They explained that they had only announced it as an M2 exclusive because at that time 3DO was the only one of the three console companies to have approved the game. However, they also mentioned that while the M2 version ran at a resolution of 640×480, hardware limitations meant they could only get the PlayStation version to run at a resolution of 512×240. The Sega Saturn version was officially announced, but eventually cancelled as part of Acclaim's withdrawal of support for the Saturn.

The M2 version was cancelled by the end of 1996. Representatives from Take-Two and 3DO said that the two companies had mutually agreed to cancel the game.

The animations for the fighters were created by motion capture filming several members of the Society for Creative Anachronism.

== Reception ==
Reception

Aggregate score
Aggregator	Score
GameRankings	46% (PS)

Review scores
Publication	Score
Electronic Gaming Monthly	5.75/10 (PS)
GameSpot	2.5/10 (PS)
Next Generation	2/5 (PS)

According to Take-Two, Iron & Blood sold above 150,000 units by the end of October 1996 and accounted for 32.0% of its revenue during that fiscal year, the total of which was $12.5 million. The company's net income in that period was $349,074.

Iron & Blood received mostly negative reviews. Covering the PlayStation version, Electronic Gaming Monthly's four-man review team praised the large lineup of fighters and said the ability to earn new magic abilities in fights is innovative, but heavily criticized the fighting engine, citing jerky controls and a lack of technique. Jeff Gerstmann of GameSpot outright panned the game, complaining of jerky controls, poor animation, and camera angles which make it impossible for the player to consistently know which button to push to go in the desired direction. A Next Generation critic instead praised the animation and graphical detail, but argued that the fighting lacks innovation. He summarized, "The combos are limited, the special moves are clichéd, and without any noticeable enhancements brought to the actual fighting, the action feels passé. The digitized speech and special effects are average, and the techno soundtrack seems laughably anachronistic against the medieval visuals." GamePro remarked that "There's no strategy (we beat the game using a single button) ... Fighters get hit, then end up with their backs to an opponent; you hit a walled ring that can hurt you more than the enemy; and the moves are basic."

According to GameSpy, "A bargain-bin game from the day it was released, Iron & Blood is best forgotten."

== Legacy ==
In October 2018, the game's rights were acquired by Canadian production company Liquid Media Group along with other titles originally owned by Acclaim Entertainment.

== See also ==
- List of fighting games
