= Panasonic M2 =

Video game console platform

- Developer: The 3DO Company, Panasonic Wondertainment
- Manufacturer: Matsushita Electric Industrial Co., Ltd.
- Type: Multimedia terminal; Video game console
- Released: Cancelled (video game console); 1998 (multimedia terminal)
- Discontinued: June 8, 2000
- Media: CD-ROM; Video CD; DVD-ROM (FZ-35S)
- CPU: 2× PowerPC 602 @ 66 MHz
- Memory: 8 MiB SDRAM
- Removable storage: Memory card; SuperDisk (FZ-35S)
- Predecessor: 3DO Interactive Multiplayer
- Related: Panasonic Jungle
- Website: m2system.com

Panasonic M2, earlier known as 3DO M2, is a multimedia terminal and cancelled video game console. It was initially developed by The 3DO Company as a peripheral chip for the 3DO hardware before turning into a standalone successor system. In January 1996, the technology was acquired by Matsushita (Panasonic) who continued development as their own game console before cancelling it altogether in 1997. The M2 technology was then incorporated into commercial-oriented devices including a Konami arcade board and in interactive kiosks.

== History ==
As with the 3DO Interactive Multiplayer, the M2 hardware was co-designed by Dave Needle and RJ Mical. First announced as a peripheral chip for the 3DO Interactive Multiplayer with a custom PowerPC microprocessor, the M2 eventually became a standalone console and was exhibited and demonstrated at the 1995 Electronic Entertainment Expo. For a time, the M2 was scheduled to be released both as a standalone unit and as an add-on chip. In 1996, an M2 developer stated that he did not think an M2 add-on chip was possible because the 3DO Interactive Multiplayer and M2 architectures were too vastly different from each other.

=== Matsushita sale ===
Panasonic Digital NetworkServe Inc.; Panasonic Wondertainment Inc.
- Type: Subsidiary
- Industry: Video games
- Founded: April 1, 1996; 30 years ago
- Headquarters: Shibuya-ku, Tokyo, Japan
- Key people: Nobuhiro Shibata (president); Takeshi Matsuo; Hiroyuki Sakai
- Parent: Matsushita Electric Industrial Co., Ltd.
- Website: pwi.co.jp

Initially the plan was for the 3DO Company to license the console to multiple manufacturers, as it had done with the 3DO Interactive Multiplayer, and both Matsushita (Panasonic) and GoldStar were signed on to produce M2 units. However, 3DO later sold exclusive rights to the M2 to Panasonic for a sum of $100 million agreed in October 1995, and relinquished their involvement with the console over the next several months. Matsushita formed a new division in April 1996 named Panasonic Wondertainment Inc. headquartered in Tokyo to be their in-house software developer for the M2. Several of the M2's third-party developers expressed concern that Panasonic would be unable to give them the same high quality development support that they had been receiving from 3DO and said that in light of this they were reconsidering whether it would be worth the effort of learning how to develop for the M2. For several months Panasonic and Sega were discussing a partnership over the M2, but talks between the two companies broke down in the second quarter of 1996. According to 3DO president Trip Hawkins, "The deal was virtually done. It only fell apart at the last minute."

According to Omid Kordestani, a 3DO spokesperson, the M2 could generate 1 million polygons per second with the graphics features turned off and 700,000 polygons per second with the features turned on. There were plans to make M2 models with built-in DVD players, similar to the later PlayStation 2. According to 3DO senior vice president of hardware engineering Toby Farrand, "M2 was designed knowing that we would make it a DVD capable player."

A preview in Next Generation published well before the console's planned release gave it four out of five stars, claiming that the M2 was several times as powerful as any gaming console then on the market. They also praised the 3DO Company's strategies for securing third-party support for the system, and concluded that "M2 has crossed the line from being a collection of fanciful tech specs to hard silicon that people can work on and believe in."

The M2 failed to appear at the 1996 Electronic Entertainment Expo; a Panasonic spokesperson at the show said they were still undecided on how they were going to use the M2 technology, and that it was no longer certain that they would be using it as a gaming platform. By the end of 1996 a release date was not yet set for the console, and third-party developers were stating that in practice the M2 was not significantly more powerful than the Nintendo 64. Electronic Gaming Monthly summarized the M2 situation at this time: "Some months, it seems the boat is still afloat: Rumors crop up of a public showing, new demos come out or a Matsushita official doles out some tantalizing hints. Other months, it seems the boat has capsized, with developers scrambling to get off the boat while they still can."

The M2 was a very powerful 64-Bit design with a lot of RAM and a big disk drive. Perhaps like the 3DO, it was slightly ahead of its time because of the component costs, but this is the design direction where the industry is headed.

— 3DO President Trip Hawkins, commenting on the cancellation of the M2

=== Cancellation of console ===
Matsushita cancelled the project in mid-1997, unwilling to compete against fellow Japanese electronics giant Sony's PlayStation and Nintendo's Nintendo 64, both of which had recently had several top-selling games released for them. Word of this leaked in late May, but it was not until July that the console's cancellation was made public, via an announcement by Matsushita president Yoichi Morishita. The M2 was canceled so close to release, marketing had already taken place in the form of flyers, and several of its prospected launch titles had gameplay screens in circulation.

In October 1997 Matsushita announced that they were marketing the M2 hardware as an industrial system capable of custom multimedia applications for simulations.

Panasonic Wondertainment would continue producing games, such as a version of Victor Interactive Software's Classic Road for Matsushita's Hi-Ho internet service, Web Mystery: Yochimu wo Miru Neko for the Dreamcast, Goraku Ō Tango! for the WonderSwan and an unknown project for the GameCube. Matsushita would exit the video game industry before the latter three's release, however, with the publishing rights for Web Mystery and Tango! being transferred to Mebius.

=== Use in other hardware ===
Development kits and prototypes of the machine became very valuable pieces among collectors. M2's technology was integrated in the multimedia players FZ-21S and FZ-35S, both released in 1998. Both products were aimed at professionals working in medicine, architecture, and sales, not home users. The M2 also became a short-lived arcade board by Konami. The agreement to develop the board was made well in advance of the M2 console's planned release date, with the understanding that games using the arcade board would be ported to the home console, similar to the relationship between the PlayStation and Namco System 11. Because games ran straight from the CD-ROM drive, it suffered from long load times and a high failure rate, so only five games were developed for it.

In the late 1990s and from 2000 on, the system was also sold in the interactive kiosk market. In 2000, PlanetWeb, Inc. began offering software to allow the M2 to be used as an Internet appliance. All of the software released for the M2 kiosks was developed with the "CDMotion for M2/M2X" software, which was a point and click "codeless" SDK for M2. None of the applications utilized the Macintosh based SDK in conjunction with Macintosh Programmers Workbench. The M2 technology was later used in automated teller machines, and in Japan in coffee vending machines.

== Hardware ==
=== Technical specifications ===
These refer to the cancelled video game console.

- Central processing unit – Dual 66 MHz PowerPC 602
  - Implements the 32-bit PowerPC RISC instruction set architecture
  - PowerPC CPU designed for consumer electronics applications
  - 1.2 watts power usage each
  - 32-bit general purpose registers and ALU
  - 33 MHz 64-bit multiplexed address and data bus
  - 4 KiB data and instruction caches (Level 1). No Level 2 cache
  - 1 integer unit, 1 floating point unit, no branch processing unit, 1 load/store unit
  - SPECint92 rating of 40 each, approximately 70 MIPS each.
  - 1 million transistors manufactured on a 0.50 micrometre CMOS process
- Custom ASICs cohabiting on the motherboard
  - BDA:
    - Memory control, system control, and video/graphic control
    - Full triangle renderer including setup engine, MPEG-1 decoder hardware, DSP for audio and various kinds of DMA control and port access
    - Random access of frame buffer and z-buffer (actually w-buffer) possible at the same time
  - CDE:
    - Power bus connected to BDA and the two CPUs
    - "bio-bus" used as a low-speed bus for peripheral hardware
- Renderer capabilities:
  - 1 million un-textured triangles/s geometry rate
  - 100 million pixels/s fill rate
  - reportedly 700,000 textured polygons/second without gouraud shading or additional effects
  - reportedly 500,000 textured polygons/second with gouraud shading, lighting and effects
  - shading: flat shading and gouraud shading
  - texture mapping
  - decal, modulation blending, tiling (16k/128k texture buffer built-in)
  - hardware z-buffer (16-bit) (actually a block floating point with multiple (4) range w-buffer)
  - object-based full-scene anti-aliasing
  - alpha channel (4-bit or 7-bit)
  - 256x224 to 640x480 resolution at 24-bit color
- Sound hardware – 16-bit 32-channel DSP at 66 MHz (within BDA chip)
- Media – Quad-speed CD-ROM drive (600 KB/s)
- RAM – Unified memory subsystem with 8 MiB
  - 64-bit bus resulting in peak 528 MB/s bandwidth
  - Average access 400 MB/s
- Full Motion Video – MPEG-1
- Writable Storage – Memory cards from 128 KiB to 32 MiB
- Expansion Capabilities – 1 PCMCIA port (potentially used for modems, Ethernet NICs, etc.)

=== Controller ===
The M2 console gamepad was designed with a three-pronged approach, similar to the Nintendo 64 controller. It was to have six face buttons positioned by the right thumb, a D-pad surrounded by a rotating analog wheel by the left thumb, an analog stick and menu button on the centre prong, and two shoulder buttons. Certain buttons on the controller were analog as well, though it's currently unknown which.

== Games and software ==
In late 1995 four M2 games in development had been shown to the public: ClayFighter III, Descent, Ironblood (later released for the PlayStation as Iron & Blood: Warriors of Ravenloft), and an untitled racing game by Studio 3DO (presumably IMSA Racing). A fifth game, D2 (a sequel to D), was previewed early the following year. Studio 3DO also claimed to be working on a version of BattleSport for M2. Other confirmed M2 projects include Return Fire 2; Power Crystal, an RPG by British developer Perceptions; a rail shooter developed by Genki; and NFLPA Superstars, a 6v6 backyard football game by Condor (later renamed Blizzard North), whose budget of nearly $1m helped the company financially during the development of Diablo. A game based on the film Escape from L.A. was announced in 1996, but may not have entered development.

In 1996, a Top Gun game was in development by Spectrum Holobyte but was never released.

Capcom and Konami were both later confirmed to be licensed M2 developers.

First-party studio Panasonic Wondertainment was reported to be producing an estimate of 10 titles internally. One of these projects would later be confirmed to be a racing game. Studio 3DO were also set to publish a similar amount of titles, but this lineup would shrink to just two to four titles until the M2's cancellation. The only game to release from this lineup would become High Heat Baseball 1999.

Ultra Game Players magazine reported in its July 1997 issue that, according to a former 3DO employee, nearly 80 games were in development for the M2. Among them were projects from Namco, ASCII, Treasure, Hudson Soft and Enix.

An M2 port of the Sega Saturn game Digital Dance Mix Vol. 1 Namie Amuro was reportedly showcased by Matsushita at the Digitalmedia World Expo trade event in November 1997.

In 2008, the now-defunct website Games That Weren't 3DO/M2 released a 2D shooter that was originally part of IMSA Racing as a hidden mini game but was made bootable to work as a stand-alone game on any 3DO M2 hardware.

In 2010 the only completed M2 game, IMSA Racing, was made available to the public.

In 2017, two fully playable builds of Ironblood were released by a German collector and are available for download to this day.

In January 2020, a compilation demo disc was released by the YouTube channel “Video Game Esoterica”. The disc contains twelve diverse demos from the development period of M2 and includes the only known playable files of the M2 version of D2.

=== Released software ===
Title	Description	Developer/Publisher
Battle Tryst	An arcade 3D fighting game released in 1998.	Konami
CG400		Takei Scientific Instruments
CR Den-Den-Den Chapter 1 S	A pachinko machine.	Toyomaru Microcabin
Evil Night / Hell Night	An arcade light gun shooter released in 1998.	Konami
Jukunen no Kagayaki / The Radiance of Mature Age		China Sunnet
Heat of Eleven '98 / The World Soccer Championship	An arcade soccer game released in 1998.	Konami
Oldmobile	Software intended to display information about cars on display.	General Motors
PonPonLand Vol. 1		Jyonan Electric Industrial
Unknown disaster prevention game	A disaster prevention game installed at the Fire Museum of Memphis.	RISE International
Tobe! Polystars	An arcade shoot-em-up released in 1997.	Konami
Total Vice	An arcade light gun shooter released in 1997.	Konami
vizHouse	An architectural CAD software for designing and presenting houses.	Matsushita Electric Industrial
