= Return Fire 2 =

1998 video game

- Developer: Silent Software
- Publisher: Ripcord Games
- Platform: Windows
- Release: NA: September 21, 1998
- Genre: Strategy
- Modes: Single-player, multiplayer

Return Fire 2 is a computer game developed by Silent Software and published for Windows by Ripcord Games in 1998. It is a sequel to Return Fire.

== Gameplay ==
The game simulates a vehicle-based capture the flag competition.

Upon starting the game, players are directed to their bunker. There, they can view the battleground with a radar and access a limited supply of vehicles: tanks, armored support vehicles (ASVs), helicopters, jets, jeeps and PT boats. The vehicles have a limited supply of fuel and ammo, and the player can only control one vehicle at a time.

The objective is to enter the enemy's base, capture their flag and bring it back to the player's base. The flag is always located in a 'flag tower', which must be destroyed before the flag can be picked up. There may be more than one enemy flag tower, but only one of them contains the flag. Although the flag may be discovered using any vehicle, it can only be carried by the jeep, which is the weakest vehicle in the game. Therefore, the player must destroy the enemy flag's defenses using stronger vehicles before attempting to take it.

The game retains the classical soundtrack of its predecessor, with each vehicle having its own 'theme' which is heard when the player is using that vehicle.

== Development ==
The game was showcased at E3 1997. It was originally scheduled to release in late 1997 by MGM Interactive. It was initially announced for the Panasonic M2 console, which was aborted in mid-1997, forcing M2 to developers to either convert their M2 projects to other platforms or cancel them. Towards the end of development, it was announced that Return Fire 2 would instead be released for the PC and PlayStation, but ultimately only the PC version was released.

== Reception ==
Reception

Review scores
Publication	Score
CNET Gamecenter	8/10
Computer Games Strategy Plus	2.5/5
Computer Gaming World	3.5/5
Game Informer	8/10
GamePro	4.5/5 (Note: GamePro gave the game three 4.5/5 scores for graphics, sound, and overall fun factor, and 3.5/5 for control.)
GameSpot	8.1/10
GameStar	52%
IGN	7.8/10
PC Accelerator	5/10
PC Gamer (US)	88%

The game received favorable to average reviews.
