= D&H Distributing =

American technology products distributor

- Type: Private
- Founded: 1918
- Founders: David Schwab, Harry Spector
- Headquarters: Harrisburg, Pennsylvania, U.S.
- Products: Technology distribution
- Website: www.dandh.com

D&H Distributing is a privately held North American technology distributor to the information technology (IT) and consumer electronics supply channels, founded in 1918 in Williamsport, Pennsylvania. Currently headquartered in Harrisburg, Pennsylvania, the company distributes IT products, including server, storage and networking solutions, consumer electronics, videogaming, home networking, housewares, and sports and recreation products with a focus on resellers selling to small business (SMB) technology customers. These products are distributed via six locations throughout the U.S. and Canada. The company's customer base consists of managed service providers, value-added computer resellers, integrators, retailers, etailers and consumer electronics dealers. The majority of D&H's SMB (small to mid-size business) and mid-market reseller customer base sells to regional offices in vertical markets, such as healthcare, education, state and local government, real estate, advertising, and finance.

D&H Distributing was a $5.9 billion organization in November of 2024 and is listed at #106 on the 2024 Forbes list of America's largest private companies, making it one of the largest private employers in the Harrisburg, Pennsylvania region. The distributor has ranked as high as #84 on the Forbes list of America's Largest Private Companies

The company ships out of six separate locations including its U.S. headquarters in Harrisburg, Pennsylvania, a Canadian headquarters in Mississauga, Ontario, an Atlanta distribution center, and additional locations in Chicago and Fresno, California. In 2017, D&H added a warehouse location in Vancouver, Canada. D&H Canada moved into a new distribution center and company headquarters in 2023 in Mississauga, Ontario, Canada.

== History ==
D&H Distributing was founded as Economy Tire and Rubber, a tire retreading company, established by brothers-in-law David Schwab and Harry Spector. In 1921, the company began selling wholesale parts for automobile service industry, adding crystal radios by 1926 and moving into a distribution capacity by signing with radio manufacturer Philco. Consumer appliances such as refrigerators, washers, vacuum cleaners, and ranges were added to the company’s offerings. The company was renamed D&H Distributing on November 8, 1929.

By the 1950s, D&H grew along with the boom in both post-World War II kitchen appliance sales and the advent of the television set.

In 1973, D&H established its Electronics Specialty Products Division. By the late 1970s, the company entered the video gaming market with the addition of Atari. As the 1980s approached, D&H licensed products from Texas Instruments, Packard Bell, Commodore Computers and Panasonic Printers, and expanded its consumer electronics linecard to form the distributor’s current Computer Products Division. In the late 1980s, it expanded nationally through the addition of warehouses in Chicago, Boston, and Dallas.

The company added large-scale IT networking manufacturers, such as Microsoft, Cisco, and Lenovo between 2000 and 2006.

In 2007, the company expanded outside the U.S. with a Canadian headquarters in Mississauga, Ontario. In 2018, D&H announced its intent to purchase 275 acres of property in Lower Swatara Township, Pennsylvania to build a new distribution hub. In 2019, D&H relocated its headquarters to a 50-acre, two building campus with more than 240,000 square feet of office space. In 2022, D&H opened a new 745,000-foot distribution center in its hometown of Harrisburg to accommodate growth.

D&H Distributing expanded its enterprise infrastructure business through its Advanced Solutions+ business unit, which focuses on enterprise technology and provides infrastructure, services, and enablement for enterprise and mid-market customers. The unit includes dedicated sales and technical resources and expanded capabilities in the United States and Canada.

In 2025, D&H began distributing Dell Technologies server products, and in 2026 it added Dell's enterprise storage portfolio. The arrangement expanded D&H's distribution of Dell infrastructure products through Advanced Solutions+.

In 2025, D&H Distributing installed a solar park at its corporate headquarters in Harrisburg, Pennsylvania. The ground-mounted installation occupies approximately five acres within the walking track area of the headquarters and consists of 3,888 solar modules. The system is intended to offset a portion of the company's electricity use. The project was developed in partnership with Coral Reef Partners and DCE Solar. A ribbon-cutting ceremony marking the opening of the solar park was held in October 2025.

D&H adds Fortinet to their cybersecurity lineup in January 2026, making D&H one of Fortinet's master distributors.

Izzy Schwab, D&H Distributing's chairman emeritus, died on January 28, 2026, at the age of 90. The company said he died of natural causes surrounded by his family. Schwab began working at D&H as a teenager and started his career as an entry-level salesperson in 1957. He later served as president and chief executive officer, including as CEO from 1999 to 2008.

== Products and services ==
D&H’s product offerings include information technology solutions, including remote work infrastructures, pro-AV, esports, servers, storage and networking solutions: mobility, consumer electronics, home entertainment, home networking and automation, small office/home office, video surveillance, digital imaging and videogaming products. Major vendor partners include companies such as Microsoft, Cisco, HP, Lenovo, Intel, Samsung, Sony, Toshiba, Dell and others. D&H launched an updated Cloud Marketplace platform in 2019, creating a hosted “everything-as-a-service” offering for value added resellers and managed service providers. In 2020, D&H added set of outsourced professional services for its North American SMB reseller partners including integration services, endpoint managed services, and a variety of project-specific services. In 2024, D&H launched its "Go Big AI" readiness program to help demystify AI-based solutions for its partners.

== Leadership ==
Michael Schwab and Dan Schwab are co-presidents at D&H Distributing, which was founded in 1918 by their grandfather. They were named co-presidents of D&H Distributing in 2008. Since D&H Co-Presidents Michael Schwab and Dan Schwab took over day-to-day operations, the distributor has grown from a $1.45 billion company into a nearly $6 billion company. During that time frame, the value of the company’s Employee Stock Ownership Plan has grown more than 300 percent. The company had 1,600+ employees as of November 2024.
