= Okage: Shadow King =

2001 video game

- North American PlayStation 2 box art
- Developer: Zener Works (Note: Additional work by Sony Computer Entertainment Japan.)
- Publisher: Sony Computer Entertainment
- Director: Noriyuki Henmi
- Producer: Tetsuji Yamamoto
- Designer: Shigeru Goto
- Programmer: Yasushi Takeda
- Writers: Masahiko Yokomizo; Akira Nemoto
- Composers: Jun-Ichi Doi; Takamitsu Kajikawa; Yoshikazu Kawatani; Toda Kazuhide; Toshiaki Murata
- Platform: PlayStation 2
- Release: JP: March 15, 2001; NA: October 2, 2001
- Genre: Role-playing
- Mode: Single player

Okage: Shadow King, known in Japan as Boku to Maō (Note: ボクと魔王, Boku to Maō; literally "Me and the Devil King"), is a 2001 role-playing video game developed by Zener Works and published by Sony Computer Entertainment for the PlayStation 2. It was never released in PAL regions until the PlayStation 2 classic lineup for PlayStation 4 was released on March 23, 2016.

== Gameplay ==
In Okage: Shadow King, the player character Ari proceeds through the game by visiting towns, traveling across the overworld and exploring dungeons. The game contains warp pillars that can be used to quickly travel to other locations once they have been discovered.

The turn-based combat is similar to that of many role-playing games, with characters having health points (HP) and magic points (MP). Battles generally commence when the player touches an enemy on the overworld. In addition to party members engaging in combat, Ari's shadow Stan, although not playable, may use powerful magic attacks on the enemy. Each fight is turned based, and a character can opt to wait in order to perform a more powerful combo attack with other characters. Characters have innate elements that are visible to the player during battle. This determines the types of spells they learn and what spells are strong against which enemies (for instance, lightning magic is strong against ice characters). If Ari is defeated at any time during battle, the player suffers a "game over" and must return to their last save.

== Plot ==
=== Story ===
Ari is a 16 year old boy who lives in the village of Tenel with his mother, father, grandparents, and his little sister, Annie. Ari is often described by the various people in his life as being overshadowed, constantly being ignored or talked over without regard. One day, when the circus arrives in town and Ari misses it due to his father talking to him for two hours about a bottle he brought home the previous night, Ari finds Annie passed out after being attacked by a ghost, cursing her to speak pig latin. Distraught over what happened to her, Ari's father brings the family to the basement to perform a ritual that he believes would open the bottle and cure her. However, after reciting the incantation, he unknowingly releases the spirit of a 300 year old "Evil King" named Lord Stanley Hihat Trinidad XIV, or "Stan" for short, alongside his butler, James. Though Stan agrees to cure Annie, he only does so under the condition that one member of the family must give their shadow as a vessel for Stan and serve as his slave for all of eternity. Ari is then selected after a contest comparing the family's shadows due to his personality and overshadowed status.

The next morning, though Stan attempts to bring terror to the people of Tenel, he finds he only brings either mocking laughter or praise from villagers who believe him to be some kind of god. After investigating, Ari and Stan learn from the circus' ringmaster than in the time since Stan was sealed in the bottle, various "Evil Kings" have taken his dark power and have begun to appear throughout the world causing havok, leaving Stan with virtually no power upon his resurrection. As such, Stan forces Ari to take him throughout the world to regain his power.

Throughout Ari's adventure, he defeats various Evil Kings and meets new allies. This includes Rosalyn, a female warrior constantly seen with a pink parasol due to the fact she was once a vessel for Stan three years prior to the game, leaving her with a pink shadow that she's embarrassed by. Kisling, an old ghost researcher who mainly joins due to Rosalyn's beauty who she only allows to join to annoy Stan, who doesn't like him, and Princess Marlene, who escapes the grasp of her concerned chamberlain, Beiloune, to cure her boredom with royal life and to subjugate Evil Kings. Two of the former Evil Kings, the muscle and fighting obsessed Big Bull and teen idol Linda, also join Ari's party.

Following various clues from the Evil Kings regarding something at the back of the Madril Sewers, located in the second town, the group finds a switch that Ari presses, leading to everyone to question what they were doing there as they leave without him. Ari then finds out that the switch has made him invisible, with everyone in the world not only unable to see him, everyone he knew has practically forgotten his existence as the entire story about Stan has seemingly changed, with Rosalyn being a lone hero hunting him and everyone else doing their own things. Ari then finds the town of Triste, only occupied by people who the world has forgotten and disregarded, existing only as a combination of people and spirits. In town, Ari meets the circus ringmaster, Block, who reveals that Ari has become so overshadowed that he's considered insignificant to society, and the only way for him to go back to normal is if he begins to speak up for himself.

After interacting with everyone in the world and slowly having more people feel like someone is talking to them, Stan eventually returns back to Ari's shadow, and the two get everyone back together. However, when they try to find Marlene, they cannot find her. It's only when they return to Ari's house that they find Marlene being choked in the air with Beiloune in front of her, revealing to Ari, his friends and his parents the truth of the world. Beiloune is the creator of the world and the master of its system known as 'Classification', which dictates what role people born into the world will play, such as Stan being an Evil King or Rosalyn a hero because Beiloune mandated it. He then reveals Marlene is actually his daughter who has seemingly disappeared, Ari is considered a 'deviant' due to being one of the rare people who managed to not fall into the Classification system and be their own person, and that the "Princess Marlene" they knew was actually just a doll Beiloune made to replace his missing daughter. He escapes, plotting to send more Evil Kings to stop Ari.

Ari and his friends continue their quest, defeating the Phantom Evil King, Epros, and befriending him, and then defeating the last Evil King, the Vampire Evil King, who leads Ari and his friends to Beiloune's World Library. Within the World Library, Beiloune messes with the Classification system to give Stan and Rosalyn ultimate power, forcing them to fight to the death and leading Ari to use a voice recorder he had been building throughout the game to remind Stan and Rosalyn of their real dynamic. Defeating Beiloune, he vanishes from the world in search of the true Marlene leading to the destruction of the Classification system. Ari and his friends part for their own separate ways as Ari returns home in time for Tenel's festival to a hero's welcome. After his dad tells him to head home to gather lunches from his mom and after Annie tells Ari someone came to their house asking for them, his mom introduces him to the guest Annie mentioned; a girl who looks exactly like Marlene and is heavily implied to be the true Marlene. Ari and the girl hold hands as they enter the home, with a post-credits scene showing Stan rising from the ground and plotting to continue Ari's servitude and torment.

=== Characters ===
- Ari (ルカ, Ruka): The main protagonist of the game. A quiet, 16-year-old boy with an overshadowed destiny. His shadow is so thin that most people ignore him and it is what enables Stan to take him as his slave. Ari reluctantly takes on the responsibility of being enslaved by the Evil King Stan in order to save his sister from the ghost's curse—and once that's done, to save the world from the Fake Evil Kings and restore Stan's true power. In the beginning of the story, his weapon is a branch. He obtains a sword, which is upgradable, as he progresses through the game. In the Japanese version, his eyes are wide open. They were toned down in the US version.
- Lord Stanley Hihat Trinidad XIV (スタンリーハイハットトリニダード14世, Sutanrī Haihatto Torinidādo Jūyonsei), better known as Evil King Stan, or just Stan, possesses Ari's shadow to appear in this world. He is short-tempered and has a childish personality, but has moments where he picks up on things that even the other group members miss. He has built his identity on being evil and desires to be feared by the world as the Great Evil King. He claims to be the reincarnation of, and therefore the heir to, the Great Evil King Gohma, who was defeated by the Great Hero Hopkins three hundred years prior to the story. Hopkins also sealed Stan away in a bottle, which is found by Ari's father.
- James (ジェームス, Jēmusu) is the cheerful ghost butler to the Evil King Stan. He is seen quite a few times in the game, mostly with just info on things you should know about, but he is often too preoccupied with something (or someone) else to follow his "almighty" master's orders.
- Rosalyn (ロザリー, Rozarī) is a 22-year-old heroine, a master of the rapier and the reluctant devotee of the parasol. She and Stan have a history of conflict which began upon releasing him from his bottle three years prior to the game's beginning; Stan took over her shadow for just long enough to insult her figure and her to threaten to kill herself (thus killing him) before he retreated back into the bottle.

Rosalyn used to be an elite hero and was at the top of her class, but ever since her shadow became pink she has been a laughing stock and forced to hide her shameful shadow under a parasol. She never forgave Stan for this mockery and has been hunting for him since. She feels she needs to prove her strength and skill as an expert swordswoman and caster of spells. She is also a magnet for ghosts.

- Princess Marlene (マルレイン, Marurein): As a spoiled princess, she is snobbish and pompous before truly getting to know Ari and his family. Later in the game, the player finds out that the Marlene they know is actually a doll, and that the real Marlene's body is trapped elsewhere in the world of her father's creation. She also seems to be Ari's love interest, as they are seen holding hands in the ending.
- Gutten Kisling (グッテン･キスリング, Gutten Kisuringu): An extremely eccentric scientist who has devoted his life to ghost research while enjoying such hobbies as stalking pretty girls and collecting toenail clippings. Upon meeting the party, he is enticed by Rosalyn's ability to attract ghosts and joins the quest without a single party member's approval. Despite his behavior, the 45-year-old Kisling seems to be quite intelligent, and he wields powerful offensive magic.
- Big Bull (ビッグブル, Biggu Buru): Formerly the "Big Bull Evil King", a fighter with great physical strength who loves exercise and battle. He excitedly joins Ari's party to help defeat the other evil kings after he, himself, is defeated. His dream is to someday open his own athletic gym. His idiotic and unwitting personality clashes with Rosalyn and Stan but he's too cheerful and loving of the party to notice or care. He has a crush on Linda.
- Linda (リンダ, Rinda): She is an aspiring singer from Madril who unfortunately lacks talent so later uses Stan's stolen power to become the "Teen Idol Evil King" and loved by her brainwashed fans. Though she is somewhat subdued when Ari first meets her, after she joins the party, her truly cheery and very bubbly personality comes out. Initially, she seemed to have a crush on Ari, but it is later discovered that she actually had a crush on Stan who just happened to have the "dorky" "doll", Ari, attached to him. Further down the line, Linda's crush on Stan seems to fade in favor of one blossoming for the reluctant Epros. She attacks using her microphone as a weapon and supports the party with magical chants.
- Epros (エプロス, Epurosu): Using Stan's power, he is known as the "Phantom Evil King" and throws playing cards and casts magic to attack his enemies. He is sophisticated and well-dressed, though his interests in magic and the "truth" of the world, as well as his ability to float about and his strange speech pattern, make him as peculiar as the rest of the cast. He always speaks in rhyme and with Shakespearean words, which confuses the team and annoys Stan to no end. Like the other "Evil King" party members, Epros joins the group after he is defeated, late in the game. Epros is the main love interest of Linda, but only after she gets over Stan.

== Development and release ==
Okage: Shadow King was developed by Zener Works and published by Sony Computer Entertainment. Programmer Yasushi Takeda, one of the founders of Zener Works, recalled that the company was producing a game for the Panasonic M2 prior to the system's cancellation. Sony contacted them in June 1997 about making a game for the original PlayStation. Okage thus began development but the project was moved to the PlayStation 2 when Sony requested Zener Works do so the day before it announced its next-generation console on March 1, 1999. All the graphics and coding was redone in order to be compatible with the newer console's Emotion Engine. Takeda stated that debugging was a challenge due to the company working with the console in an early state and the absence of such tools.

== Reception ==
Reception

Aggregate score
Aggregator	Score
Metacritic	70/100

Review scores
Publication	Score
Electronic Gaming Monthly	5.83/10
Famitsu	30/40
Game Informer	8/10
GamePro	3.5/5
GameRevolution	C
GameSpot	7.8/10
GameSpy	79%
GameZone	7.8/10
IGN	7.2/10
Official U.S. PlayStation Magazine	3/5

The PlayStation 2 version received "average" reviews according to the review aggregation website Metacritic. In Japan, Famitsu gave it a score of 30 out of 40.
