= Artworx =

1980s video game series

Artworx was a Naples, Florida software company that produced and supported a line of video games ( specializing in poker and other card games) from 1981 to 2015. It is named after the founder's given name. At first the company published a variety of games, including in adventure and action genres, but became best known for a strip poker series.

Some other Artworx titles are Bridge 8.0 and King of Solitaire, although these have not sold as well as the poker games. Artworx' titles were released by partner companies in regional markets: Anco in Europe, CDS Software and Guildhall in the United Kingdom, and Artworx in the rest of the world.

== Strip Poker ==
Artworx
- Genres: Erotic, card
- Developer: Artworx
- First release: 1982
- Latest release: 1995

The Strip Poker series ran from 1982 to 1995 over five games. The player is a presumed male who plays strip poker against attractive women. The games received generally positive reviews over the series history. Critics appreciated the game's sense of humour and for effectively using their limited graphics to create titillating imagery. Others felt that a video game was a depressing way for players to view such content, when alternatives like Playboy were available.

=== Gameplay ===
The player, a male poker player, plays a card game against the computer who is represented by an attractive woman. As the player beats the woman in the game, she proceeds to take off items of clothing as a reward. The core models in the series are Suzi and Melissa. Other characters are available in certain games through expansion packs.

=== Development ===
In the original game, Douglas McFarland did the graphics while Mitch Garnaat did the coding. In Strip Poker II, graphics are by Douglas McFarland, with programming by both McFarland and Mitch Garnaat.

Karen Graham, one of the developers, was looking for male models for a version targeted at the female gamer. When asked about potential controversy, Graham said that while they were bound to receive complaints with the title, the male version planned for 1988 would have evened things out, but it was never released.

=== Release ===
Billed as the first home computer strip poker video game, Strip Poker was released for the Apple II (1982), Commodore 64 (1983), Atari 8-bit computers (1983), MS-DOS (1985), Amiga (1986), Atari ST (1987), and Apple IIGS (1987). Data disks were available that offered additional opponents; these disks have since become very hard to find. Artworx's first poker game was followed by several sequels.

- Strip Poker: A Sizzling Game of Chance was released in 1982 on Apple II, Atari 8-bit computers, Commodore 16, Plus/4, Commodore 64, and IBM PC.
- Strip Poker II (aka Deluxe Strip Poker) was released in 1988 for Amiga, Apple IIGS, Atari ST, Amstrad CPC, ZX Spectrum, MSX, and IBM PC Compatibles. Anco handled European publishing while Artworx handled the American market. Strip Poker II was augmented by Strip Poker II+ and Strip Poker II data disks.
- Strip Poker Professional and Strip Poker Professional: Rev B were released on MS-DOS in 1994 and 1995 respectively.

=== Reception ===
Tilt enjoyed Strip Poker: A Sizzling Game of Chance's graphics. Computer Gamer felt that picking up a Playboy would be a better alternative to playing this game. Meanwhile Micro praised the game's sense of humour. Video Game Critic felt the game would appeal to players who wanted to see titillating content that was old-fashioned and pixelated. Aktueller Software Markt had a mixed opinion on the game, questioning its purpose. Info noted that besides the obvious draw of the title, it was the only game on the Amiga that offered a reasonable version of poker.

Tilt felt the digitised images of Strip Poker II were impressive considering they were only 16-bit. Aktueller Software Markt thought the game was on par with the original. Amiga Joker noted that games like this would always be in demand, and that it knew its audience. ACE criticized the game for it tackiness. The Games Machine panned the title as an "outrage of excessive sexism". Amiga Joker gave Strip Poker II a mixed review, commenting that it was not the best way for players to access such content. Conversely, Joystick gave the game a highly positive review, rating it 81%.
