= List of 3DO games =

The 3DO is a 32-bit hardware platform designed primarily for home video game consoles, developed by The 3DO Company, released in North America by Panasonic first on October 4, 1993. The following list contains all of the known games released for the 3DO platform as well as aftermarket (homebrew and/or independently-developed) titles, arcade games that used the 3DO hardware, and other software that are not games.

== Commercially released games ==
There are 244 (Note: This number is always up to date by this script.) officially released 3DO games on this list.

Regions released	Region description	Released
NA (North America)	North America and other NTSC territories.	161
PAL	PAL/SECAM territories: much of Europe and Australia.	93
JP (Japan)	Japan and other NTSC-J territories.	214

Title	Developer(s)	Publisher(s)	First released	Release date		
Title	Developer(s)	Publisher(s)	First released	NA	JP	PAL
Advanced Dungeons & Dragons: DeathKeep	Lion Entertainment	Strategic Simulations, Inc.	November 20, 1995^{NA}	November 20, 1995	Unreleased	1995
Advanced Dungeons & Dragons: Slayer	Lion Entertainment	Strategic Simulations, Inc. (NA); Mindscape (PAL); T&E Soft (JP)	September 8, 1994^{NA}	September 8, 1994	January 20, 1995	1995
AI Shogi	Taito	Taito	September 14, 1995^{JP}	Unreleased	September 14, 1995	Unreleased
Akagi Tōhaiden	Micronet	Micronet	January 13, 1996^{JP}	Unreleased	January 13, 1996	Unreleased
Alfred Hitchcock Presents	Toyota	Panasonic	1994^{JP}	Unreleased	1994	Unreleased
Alone in the Dark	I-Motion, Krisalis Software	Interplay Productions (NA); Infogrames (PAL); Pony Canyon (JP)	August 3, 1994^{NA}	August 3, 1994	October 21, 1994	1994
Alone in the Dark 2	I-Motion, Krisalis Software	Interplay Productions (NA); Infogrames Multimedia (PAL); Electronic Arts Victor (JP)	September 8, 1995^{JP}	October 31, 1995	September 8, 1995	1995
Another World	Interplay Productions, Lil' Gangsters Entertainment	Interplay Productions; Electronic Arts Victor (JP)	1994^{PAL}	February 15, 1994	October 21, 1994	1994
Aqua World: Umibi Monogatari (Note: Includes mini-games in which the player controls a fish to collect food or navigate underwater mazes; completing these challenges unlocks bonus movies.)	Mizuki	Mizuki	October 13, 1995^{JP}	Unreleased	October 13, 1995	Unreleased
Armageddon	GoldStar / LG Electronics	GoldStar / LG Electronics	1996^{JP}	Unreleased	1996	Unreleased
AutoBahn Tokio	Sanai Enterprise, Sanyei Shobou	Panasonic	December 22, 1995^{JP}	Unreleased	December 22, 1995	Unreleased
Bakushō!! All Yoshimoto Quiz-Ou Ketteisen	Tose	Yoshimoto Kogyo	March 24, 1995^{JP}	Unreleased	March 24, 1995	Unreleased
Ballz: The Director's Cut	Cave Logic Studios, PF.Magic	Panasonic; BMG Interactive (JP)	September 13, 1995^{NA}	September 13, 1995	September 14, 1995	1995
Battle Blues	Shin's Deco	GoldStar / LG Electronics	1996^{JP}	Unreleased	1996	Unreleased
Battle Chess	Krisalis Software	Interplay Productions; Electronic Arts Victor (JP)	September 16, 1994^{NA JP}	September 16, 1994	September 16, 1994	1994
Battle Pinball	Japan DataWorks	Panasonic	November 25, 1994^{JP}	Unreleased	November 25, 1994	Unreleased
BattleSport	Cyclone Studios	The 3DO Company	December 15, 1995^{NA}	December 15, 1995	Unreleased	1996
BC Racers	Core Design	GoldStar / LG Electronics	1995^{PAL}	December 15, 1995	Unreleased	1995
Belzerion	Human Entertainment	Human Entertainment	December 16, 1994^{JP}	Unreleased	December 16, 1994	Unreleased
Blade Force	Studio 3DO	The 3DO Company	October 2, 1995^{NA}	October 2, 1995	October 20, 1995	1995
Blue Forest Story: Kaze no Fūin	Right Stuff	Panasonic	April 26, 1996^{JP}	Unreleased	April 26, 1996	Unreleased
Bonogurashi	Amuse Productions, Bandai Visual	Amuse Productions	April 21, 1995^{JP}	Unreleased	April 21, 1995	Unreleased
Brain Dead 13	ReadySoft	ReadySoft	December 15, 1995^{NA}	December 15, 1995	Unreleased	Unreleased
Burning Soldier	Genki	Panasonic; Pack-In-Video (JP)	June 25, 1994^{JP}	September 12, 1994	June 25, 1994	1994
Bust-a-Move	Microcabin	Taito (JP); Panasonic (NA)	November 22, 1995^{JP}	December 15, 1995	November 22, 1995	Unreleased
Cannon Fodder	Sensible Software	Virgin Interactive	1994^{NA PAL}	1994	Unreleased	1994
Captain Quazar	Cyclone Studios	The 3DO Company	January 29, 1996^{NA}	January 29, 1996	February 16, 1996	1996
Carrier: Fortress at Sea (Note: Includes a carrier-landing challenge in which the player controls an aircraft's approach and attempts to catch an arresting wire.)	RMG Dentsu USA	Panasonic	April 4, 1995^{NA}	April 4, 1995	Unreleased	Unreleased
Casper	Logicware	Interplay Productions	September 15, 1996^{NA}	September 15, 1996	Unreleased	Unreleased
Chiki Chiki Machine Mō Race	Future Pirates	Future Pirates	March 20, 1994^{JP}	Unreleased	March 20, 1994	Unreleased
Chiki Chiki Machine Mō Race 2: In Space	Future Pirates	Future Pirates	August 11, 1995^{JP}	Unreleased	August 11, 1995	Unreleased
Club 3DO: Station Invasion	Studio 3DO	The 3DO Company	December 6, 1994^{NA}	December 6, 1994	Unreleased	1994
Corpse Killer	Digital Pictures	Acclaim Distribution (NA); Acclaim Japan (JP)	March 1, 1995^{NA}	March 1, 1995	August 25, 1995	August 25, 1994
Cowboy Casino	The Computer Studio, Intellimedia Sports	IntelliPlay	July 21, 1995^{NA}	July 21, 1995	Unreleased	Unreleased
Crash 'n Burn	Crystal Dynamics	Crystal Dynamics	October 4, 1993^{NA}	October 4, 1993	March 26, 1994	Unreleased
Crayon Shin-chan: Puzzle Daimaou no Nazo	Tose	Bandai	March 10, 1995^{JP}	Unreleased	March 10, 1995	Unreleased
Creature Shock	Argonaut Software	Virgin Interactive	March 19, 1996^{NA}	March 19, 1996	Unreleased	Unreleased
Crime Patrol	American Laser Games	American Laser Games	November 15, 1994^{NA}	November 15, 1994	Unreleased	Unreleased
Cyberdillo	Pixel Technologies	Panasonic	April 15, 1996^{NA}	April 15, 1996	Unreleased	Unreleased
Cyberia	Xatrix Entertainment	Interplay Productions; Electronic Arts Victor (JP)	November 1, 1994^{PAL}	February 12, 1996	January 26, 1996	November 1, 1994
D •D no Shokutaku: Director's Cut^{JP}	Warp	Panasonic; Sanei Shobo Publishing (JP)	April 1, 1995^{JP}	October 15, 1995	April 1, 1995	1995
The Daedalus Encounter	Life Like Productions, Palmsoft	Panasonic; Hatnet (JP)	September 30, 1995^{NA}	September 30, 1995	November 10, 1995	1995
Defcon 5	Millennium Interactive	GoldStar / LG Electronics (PAL); Multisoft (JP)	1995^{PAL}	Unreleased	May 17, 1996	1995
Demolition Man	Alexandria, Inc.	Virgin Interactive	November 23, 1994^{NA}	November 23, 1994	December 9, 1994	1995
DinoPark Tycoon	Manley & Associates	MECC	December 31, 1994^{NA}	December 31, 1994	Unreleased	Unreleased
Doctor Hauzer	Riverhillsoft	Panasonic	April 29, 1994^{JP}	Unreleased	April 29, 1994	Unreleased
Doom	Art Data Interactive, id Software, Logicware	Art Data Interactive; Basho House (JP)	January 15, 1996^{NA}	January 15, 1996	April 26, 1996	1996
Doraemon Yūjō Densetsu	Riverhillsoft	Shogakukan	April 7, 1995^{JP}	Unreleased	April 7, 1995	Unreleased
Dragon Lore: The Legend Begins	Cryo Interactive	Mindscape	October 30, 1995^{NA}	October 30, 1995	Unreleased	1995
Dragon Tycoon Edge	Sala International	Sanyo	February 24, 1995^{JP}	Unreleased	February 24, 1995	Unreleased
Dragon's Lair	ReadySoft	ReadySoft; T&E Soft (JP)	March 26, 1994^{JP}	June 24, 1994	March 26, 1994	1994
Drug Wars	American Laser Games	American Laser Games	1994^{NA}	1994	Unreleased	Unreleased
Eigo de Go!	Gakken	Gakken	February 16, 1996^{JP}	Unreleased	February 16, 1996	Unreleased
Emit Vol. 1: Toki no Maigo (Note: The 3DO release includes an additional English Game mini-game in which the player uses reports of sightings to track down a criminal.)	Koei	Koei	April 14, 1995^{JP}	Unreleased	April 14, 1995	Unreleased
Emit Vol. 2: Inochigake no Tabi	Koei	Koei	July 14, 1995^{JP}	Unreleased	July 14, 1995	Unreleased
Emit Vol. 3: Watashi ni Sayonara o	Koei	Koei	September 14, 1995^{JP}	Unreleased	September 14, 1995	Unreleased
Escape from Monster Manor	Studio 3DO	Electronic Arts; Electronic Arts Victor (JP)	March 15, 1994^{NA}	March 15, 1994	March 26, 1994	1994
The Eye of Typhoon	Viccom	GoldStar / LG Electronics	1996^{JP}	Unreleased	1996	Unreleased
F1GP	Dynamite, Opera House	Pony Canyon	October 28, 1995^{JP}	Unreleased	October 28, 1995	Unreleased
Family Feud	Eurocom	GameTek	May 6, 1994^{NA}	May 6, 1994	Unreleased	Unreleased
Fatty Bear's Birthday Surprise	Humongous Entertainment	Humongous Entertainment (NA); Marubeni, Media Vision (JP)	1994^{NA}	1994	February 17, 1995	Unreleased
Fatty Bear's Fun Pack	Humongous Entertainment	Humongous Entertainment (NA); Marubeni, Media Vision (JP)	1994^{NA}	1994	August 6, 1994	Unreleased
FIFA International Soccer	Extended Play Productions	EA Sports	1994^{PAL}	November 16, 1994	Unreleased	1994
Firewall: Man vs. Machine	Visionary Media, Inc.	GoldStar / LG Electronics	1996^{JP}	Unreleased	1996	Unreleased
Flashback: The Quest for Identity	Delphine Software International, Tiertex Design Studios	U.S. Gold; Electronic Arts Victor, Interplay Productions (JP)	February 17, 1995^{JP}	March 24, 1995	February 17, 1995	1995
Flying Nightmares	Life Like Productions, Simis Limited	Domark Software	September 8, 1995^{NA}	September 8, 1995	Unreleased	1995
Foes of Ali	Gray Matter	EA Sports	December 15, 1995^{NA}	December 15, 1995	Unreleased	1995
Fun 'n Games	Williams Entertainment	Panasonic (NA); Virgin Interactive (JP)	February 17, 1995^{JP}	March 28, 1995	February 17, 1995	Unreleased
Furopon World	Warp	Warp	September 14, 1995^{JP}	Unreleased	September 14, 1995	Unreleased
Gakkō no Kowai Uwasa: Hanako-San ga Kita!!	JASPAC	Amuse Productions	August 11, 1995^{JP}	Unreleased	August 11, 1995	Unreleased
Game no Tatsujin	Sunsoft	Sunsoft	June 9, 1995^{JP}	Unreleased	June 9, 1995	Unreleased
Gex	Crystal Dynamics	Crystal Dynamics (NA); BMG Interactive	April 1995^{NA}	April 1994	July 14, 1995	1995
Goal FH	JASPAC, NHK	Carrozzeria Japan	October 13, 1995^{JP}	Unreleased	October 13, 1995	Unreleased
Gridders	Tetragon	The 3DO Company	July 13, 1994^{NA}	July 13, 1994	November 18, 1994	1994
Guardian War	Microcabin	Panasonic	September 20, 1994^{NA}	September 20, 1994	June 11, 1994	1994
Hell: A Cyberpunk Thriller	Take-Two Interactive, Tetragon	GameTek	December 1994^{NA}	December 1994	Unreleased	1994
Hello Kitty: Asobi no Omochabako	Mizuki	Mizuki, Sanrio	June 16, 1995^{JP}	Unreleased	June 16, 1995	Unreleased
The Horde	Toys For Bob	Crystal Dynamics (NA); BMG Interactive (PAL); Byse, Inc. (JP)	March 8, 1994^{NA}	March 8, 1994	July 23, 1994	April 1994
Icebreaker	Magnet Interactive Studios	Panasonic	August 15, 1995^{NA}	August 15, 1995	Unreleased	Unreleased
Ide Yōsuke Meijin no Shin Jissen Mahjong	Capcom	Capcom	June 28, 1996^{JP}	Unreleased	June 28, 1996	Unreleased
Idol Janshi Suchie-Pai Special	Jaleco	Jaleco	January 12, 1995^{JP}	Unreleased	January 12, 1995	Unreleased
Idol Mahjong Final Romance 2: Hyper Edition	Infini Entertainment Technology, Video System	ASK Kodansha	January 19, 1996^{JP}	Unreleased	January 19, 1996	Unreleased
Igo Time Trial: Shikatsu Daihyakka	Ematec	Ematec	August 11, 1995^{JP}	Unreleased	August 11, 1995	Unreleased
Igo Time Trial: Thumego 1	Ematec	Ematec	August 6, 1994^{JP}	Unreleased	August 6, 1994	Unreleased
Īda Jōji Nightmare Interactive: Moon Cradle - Igyō no Hanayome	Tose	Pack-In-Video	December 15, 1995^{JP}	Unreleased	December 15, 1995	Unreleased
Immercenary	Five Miles Out	Electronic Arts; Electronic Arts Victor (JP)	March 16, 1995^{NA}	March 16, 1995	September 22, 1995	1995
The Incredible Machine	Dynamix	Dynamix; Sierra On-Line, T&E Soft (JP)	May 7, 1994^{NA}	May 7, 1994	July 23, 1994	1994
Insect War	Riverhillsoft	Panasonic	December 16, 1994^{JP}	Unreleased	December 16, 1994	Unreleased
Iron Angel of the Apocalypse	Synergy, Inc.	Panasonic (JP); Synergy Interactive	April 9, 1994^{JP}	April 27, 1995	April 9, 1994	1995
Iron Angel of the Apocalypse: The Return	Synergy, Inc.	Synergy, Inc (JP); Synergy Interactive (NA)	September 22, 1995^{NA JP}	September 22, 1995	September 22, 1995	Unreleased
Ishida Yoshio Kudan no Igo Seiha	G.A.M.	Electronic Arts Victor	January 27, 1995^{JP}	Unreleased	January 27, 1995	Unreleased
J.League Virtual Stadium	JASPAC	Electronic Arts Victor	November 3, 1994^{JP}	Unreleased	November 3, 1994	Unreleased
J.League Virtual Stadium '95	EA Sports	Electronic Arts Victor	October 27, 1995^{JP}	Unreleased	October 27, 1995	Unreleased
J.B. Harold: Blue Chicago Blues	Riverhillsoft	Riverhillsoft	November 22, 1995^{JP}	Unreleased	November 22, 1995	Unreleased
Jammit	GTE Vantage	GTE Entertainment	November 1, 1994^{NA}	November 1, 1994	Unreleased	Unreleased
Jikki Pachi-Slot Simulator Vol. 1	Nexton	Electronic Arts Victor	July 21, 1995^{JP}	Unreleased	July 21, 1995	Unreleased
John Madden Football	High Score Productions	EA Sports; Electronic Arts Victor (JP)	May 6, 1994^{NA}	May 6, 1994	May 28, 1994	1994
Johnny Bazookatone	Arc Developments	U.S. Gold	1995^{PAL}	February 22, 1996	Unreleased	1995
Jurassic Park Interactive	Studio 3DO	Universal Interactive Studios; Panasonic (JP)	May 10, 1994^{NA}	May 10, 1994	December 2, 1994	1994
Kakinoki Shogi	ASCII Corporation	Panasonic	October 21, 1994^{JP}	Unreleased	October 21, 1994	Unreleased
Kero Kero Keroppi to Origami no Tabibito	JASPAC, Mizuki	Mizuki, Sanrio	June 16, 1995^{JP}	Unreleased	June 16, 1995	Unreleased
Killing Time	Studio 3DO	The 3DO Company	August 15, 1995^{NA}	August 15, 1995	December 22, 1995	November 10, 1995
Kingdom: The Far Reaches	Interplay Productions, Virtual Image Productions	Interplay Productions	July 18, 1995^{NA}	July 18, 1995	Unreleased	1996
Konpeki no Kantai	Microcabin	Tokuma Shoten	April 21, 1995^{JP}	Unreleased	April 21, 1995	Unreleased
Kurokishi no Kamen	HummingBirdSoft	Panasonic	May 28, 1994^{JP}	Unreleased	May 28, 1994	Unreleased
The Last Bounty Hunter	American Laser Games	American Laser Games	October 16, 1995^{NA}	October 16, 1995	Unreleased	Unreleased
Lemmings	DMA Design	Psygnosis (NA); Electronic Arts Victor (JP)	1994^{NA}	1994	August 6, 1994	Unreleased
Lost Eden	Cryo Interactive	Virgin Interactive	March 1, 1995^{NA}	March 1, 1995	Unreleased	Unreleased
The Lost Files of Sherlock Holmes	Mythos Software	Electronic Arts	June 1, 1994^{NA}	June 1, 1994	Unreleased	1994
Lucienne's Quest	Microcabin	Panasonic (NA); Microcabin (JP)	September 14, 1995^{JP}	April 15, 1996	September 14, 1995	Unreleased
Macaroni Hōren Shō Interactive	Future Pirates	Toshiba EMI	January 13, 1995^{JP}	Unreleased	January 13, 1995	Unreleased
Mad Dog II: The Lost Gold	American Laser Games	American Laser Games	September 1, 1994^{NA}	September 1, 1994	Unreleased	Unreleased
Mad Dog McCree	American Laser Games	American Laser Games	January 1994^{NA}	January 1994	Unreleased	Unreleased
Mahjong Gokū Tenjiku	Chat Noir	ASCII Corporation	June 25, 1994^{JP}	Unreleased	June 25, 1994	Unreleased
Mahjong-kyo Jidai: AV Gal Seifukuhen	Micronet	Micronet	July 20, 1994^{JP}	Unreleased	July 20, 1994	Unreleased
Mahjong-kyo Jidai: Ko Gal Hokagohen	Micronet	Micronet	October 18, 1995^{JP}	Unreleased	October 18, 1995	Unreleased
Masters: Harukanaru Augusta 3	T&E Soft	T&E Soft	July 9, 1994^{JP}	Unreleased	July 9, 1994	Unreleased
Mazer	American Laser Games	American Laser Games	July 31, 1995^{NA}	July 31, 1995	Unreleased	Unreleased
MegaRace	Cryo Interactive	Mindscape; Multisoft (JP)	May 1994^{NA}	May 1994	October 7, 1994	1994
Microcosm	Psygnosis	Psygnosis (NA); T&E Soft (JP)	March 14, 1994^{NA}	March 14, 1994	July 9, 1994	Unreleased
Mind Teazzer	Vivid Interactive	Vivid Interactive	1994^{NA}	1994	Unreleased	1994
Mirai Shōnen Konan Digital Library (Note: Includes two mini-games: Patapata, an image-matching slot game, and Puzzle, a 4×4 sliding-tile puzzle.)	Bandai Visual	Bandai Visual	October 20, 1995^{JP}	Unreleased	October 20, 1995	Unreleased
Monoshiri Koro Yūgaku	Shinko Human Create	Shinko Human Create	December 15, 1995^{JP}	Unreleased	December 15, 1995	Unreleased
Montana Jones	Future Pirates	Future Pirates	January 20, 1995^{JP}	Unreleased	January 20, 1995	Unreleased
Murphy da yo Zenin Shūgō	Vantan International	Vantan International	October 21, 1994^{JP}	Unreleased	October 21, 1994	Unreleased
Myst	Microcabin	Panasonic; Microcabin (JP)	March 17, 1995^{NA}	March 17, 1995	April 14, 1995	1995
N.O.B.: Neo Organic Bioform	Octagon Entertainment	Sanyo	December 15, 1995^{JP}	Unreleased	December 15, 1995	Unreleased
Nemurenu Yoru no Chīsana Ohanashi	Amuse Productions	Amuse Productions	December 16, 1994^{JP}	Unreleased	December 16, 1994	Unreleased
NeuroDancer: Journey Into the Neuronet!	Electric Dreams Inc.	PIXIS Interactive	December 6, 1994^{NA}	December 6, 1994	Unreleased	Unreleased
Nice Body All-Star Suiei Taikai	BrainBusters, East Wind Corporation	Fuji Television	May 19, 1995^{JP}	Unreleased	May 19, 1995	Unreleased
Night Trap	Digital Pictures	Virgin Interactive; Virgin Games (JP)	January 1994^{NA}	January 1994	June 25, 1994	1994
Nishimura Kyōtarō Travel Mystery: Akugyaku no Kisetsu - Tokyo~Nanki Shirahama Renzoku Satsujin Jiken	Tose	Pack-In-Video, Panasonic	November 25, 1994^{JP}	Unreleased	November 25, 1994	Unreleased
Nobunaga no Yabō: Haōden	Koei	Koei	September 16, 1994^{JP}	Unreleased	September 16, 1994	Unreleased
Nontan to Issho: Hoshino Okurimono	Victor Entertainment	Panasonic	May 19, 1995^{JP}	Unreleased	May 19, 1995	Unreleased
Nontan to Issho: Nohara de Asobo	Victor Entertainment	Panasonic	June 11, 1994^{JP}	Unreleased	June 11, 1994	Unreleased
Novastorm	Psygnosis	Psygnosis (NA); T&E Soft (JP)	October 7, 1994^{JP}	December 15, 1994	October 7, 1994	Unreleased
Off-World Interceptor	Crystal Dynamics	Crystal Dynamics; BMG Interactive (JP)	November 23, 1994^{NA}	November 23, 1994	December 16, 1994	1994
Olympic Soccer	Silicon Dreams, Tiertex Design Studios	Eidos Interactive, Panasonic, U.S. Gold	April 12, 1996^{NA}	April 12, 1996	Unreleased	Unreleased
Olympic Summer Games	Silicon Dreams, Tiertex Design Studios	Eidos Interactive, Panasonic, U.S. Gold	June 1996^{NA}	June 1996	Unreleased	Unreleased
Oneesan to Issho! Janken Paradise	V.I.P. Corporation	Intarus	December 16, 1994^{JP}	Unreleased	December 16, 1994	Unreleased
Oneesan to Issho! Kisekae Paradise	B.S.S. Corporation	B.S.S. Corporation	November 22, 1995^{JP}	Unreleased	November 22, 1995	Unreleased
Ōkoku no Grand Chef	Sala International	Sala International	March 1, 1996^{JP}	Unreleased	March 1, 1996	Unreleased
Oyaji Hunter Mahjong	Warp	Warp	July 14, 1995^{JP}	Unreleased	July 14, 1995	Unreleased
Panzer General	Strategic Simulations, Inc.	Strategic Simulations, Inc. (NA); Mindscape (PAL)	1995^{NA}	1995	Unreleased	1995
PaTaank	PF.Magic	PF.Magic; BMG Interactive (JP)	November 3, 1994^{NA JP}	November 3, 1994	November 3, 1994	1994
Pebble Beach Golf Links	T&E Soft	Panasonic; T&E Soft (JP)	March 15, 1994^{NA}	March 15, 1994	March 20, 1994	1994
The Perfect General	Game Guild	Kirin Entertainment	1996^{NA}	1996	Unreleased	Unreleased
Peter Frankl: Puzzle no Tō	TBS Multimedia	Hamlet	January 13, 1995^{JP}	Unreleased	January 13, 1995	Unreleased
PGA Tour 96	Hitmen Productions, NuFX	EA Sports	November 1995^{NA}	November 1995	Unreleased	1995
Phoenix 3	Gray Matter	The 3DO Company	1995^{NA}	1995	Unreleased	1995
Plumbers Don't Wear Ties	United Pixtures	Kirin Entertainment	September 30, 1994^{NA}	September 30, 1994	Unreleased	Unreleased
PO'ed	Any Channel	Any Channel (NA); The 3DO Company (PAL)	November 6, 1995^{NA}	November 6, 1995	Unreleased	1995
Policenauts	Konami	Konami	September 29, 1995^{JP}	Unreleased	September 29, 1995	Unreleased
Pretty Soldier Sailor Moon S	Tose	Bandai	March 17, 1995^{JP}	Unreleased	March 17, 1995	Unreleased
Primal Rage	Probe Entertainment	GoldStar / LG Electronics	December 15, 1995^{NA}	December 15, 1995	Unreleased	1995
Princess Maker 2	Gainax	Microcabin	December 9, 1995^{JP}	Unreleased	December 9, 1995	Unreleased
Pro Stadium	Workman	Sanyo	December 8, 1995^{JP}	Unreleased	December 8, 1995	Unreleased
Pro Yakyū Virtual Stadium: Professional Baseball	EA Sports	Electronic Arts Victor	December 29, 1995^{JP}	Unreleased	December 29, 1995	Unreleased
Psychic Detective	Colossal Pictures, Electronic Arts	Electronic Arts	November 10, 1995^{NA}	November 10, 1995	Unreleased	1995
Puppet Tale	Microcabin	Panasonic	July 23, 1994^{JP}	Unreleased	July 23, 1994	Unreleased
Putt-Putt Goes to the Moon	Humongous Entertainment	Humongous Entertainment	1994^{NA}	1994	Unreleased	Unreleased
Putt-Putt Joins the Parade	Humongous Entertainment	Humongous Entertainment (NA); Marubeni, Media Vision (JP)	1994^{NA}	1994	December 2, 1994	Unreleased
Putt-Putt's Fun Pack	Humongous Entertainment	Humongous Entertainment (NA); Marubeni, Media Vision (JP)	June 1, 1994^{NA}	June 1, 1994	August 6, 1994	Unreleased
Pyramid Intruder	HighTech Lab. Japan	Taito	August 11, 1995^{JP}	Unreleased	August 11, 1995	Unreleased
Quarantine	Imagexcel	GameTek; Imagineer (JP)	March 17, 1995^{NA}	March 17, 1995	September 14, 1995	1995
Quarterback Attack with Mike Ditka	Digital Pictures	Acclaim Distribution	November 27, 1995^{NA}	November 27, 1995	Unreleased	Unreleased
Real Pinball	Japan DataWorks	Panasonic	March 20, 1994^{JP}	July 6, 1994	March 20, 1994	1994
Return Fire	Silent Software	Prolific Publishing; The 3DO Company (JP)	January 11, 1995^{NA}	January 11, 1995	July 14, 1995	December 22, 1995
Return Fire: Maps O' Death (expansion)	Silent Software	Prolific Publishing (NA); The 3DO Company (PAL)	December 15, 1995^{NA}	December 15, 1995	Unreleased	1996
Rise of the Robots	Art Data Interactive	Absolute Entertainment (NA); Mirage (PAL)	March 17, 1995^{PAL}	March 24, 1995	Unreleased	March 17, 1995
Road & Track Presents: The Need for Speed	Electronic Arts Canada	Electronic Arts; Electronic Arts Victor (JP)	December 2, 1994^{PAL}	December 13, 1994	December 9, 1994	December 2, 1994
Road Rash	Monkey Do Productions, New Level Software	Electronic Arts; Electronic Arts Victor (JP)	August 19, 1994^{NA}	August 19, 1994	August 27, 1994	1994
Robinson's Requiem	Silmarils	ReadySoft	April 4, 1996^{NA}	April 4, 1996	Unreleased	Unreleased
Royal Pro Wrestling: Jikkyō Live!!	Natsume Co., Ltd.	Natsume Co., Ltd.	February 23, 1996^{JP}	Unreleased	February 23, 1996	Unreleased
Samurai Shodown	Crystal Dynamics	Crystal Dynamics (NA); BMG Interactive	November 23, 1994^{NA}	November 23, 1994	February 10, 1995	1995
Sangokushi IV	Koei	Koei	March 24, 1995^{JP}	Unreleased	March 24, 1995	Unreleased
Scramble Cobra	Genki	Panasonic; Pack-In-Video (JP)	August 11, 1995^{JP}	November 15, 1995	August 11, 1995	1995
Seal of the Pharaoh	System Sacom	Panasonic (NA); ASK Kodansha (JP)	June 25, 1994^{JP}	March 6, 1994	June 25, 1994	Unreleased
Sesame Street: Numbers	Viridis Corporation	EA Kids (NA); Electronic Arts Victor (JP)	March 1, 1994^{NA}	March 1, 1994	March 17, 1995	Unreleased
Sewer Shark	Digital Pictures	Hasbro (NA); Virgin Interactive (PAL)	1994^{NA}	1994	Unreleased	1994
Shadow: War of Succession	Tribeca Digital Studios	Tribeca Digital Studios (NA); T&E Soft (JP)	September 2, 1994^{JP}	September 6, 1994	September 2, 1994	Unreleased
Shanghai: Triple-Threat	Activision, Success	Activision (NA); Electronic Arts Victor (JP)	December 16, 1994^{JP}	January 17, 1995	December 16, 1994	Unreleased
Shelley Duvall's It's a Bird's Life	Sanctuary Woods	Sanctuary Woods	1994^{NA}	1994	Unreleased	Unreleased
Shock Wave	The Advanced Technology Group	Electronic Arts; Electronic Arts Victor (JP)	June 27, 1994^{NA}	June 27, 1994	September 16, 1994	1994
Shock Wave 2: Beyond the Gate	Advanced Technology Group 2	Electronic Arts Studios (NA); Electronic Arts (PAL)	December 31, 1995^{NA}	December 31, 1995	Unreleased	January 5, 1996
Shock Wave: Operation JumpGate (expansion)	The Advanced Technology Group	Electronic Arts; Electronic Arts Victor (JP)	December 6, 1994^{NA}	December 6, 1994	May 19, 1995	1995
Short Warp	Warp	Warp	January 15, 1996^{JP}	Unreleased	January 15, 1996	Unreleased
Slam 'N Jam '95	Left Field Productions	Crystal Dynamics (NA); BMG Interactive	May 23, 1995^{NA}	May 23, 1995	June 30, 1995	1995
Snow Job	iXL Interactive Excellence	The 3DO Company	May 15, 1996^{NA}	May 15, 1996	Unreleased	1996
Soccer Kid	Team17	The 3DO Company	September 15, 1994^{NA}	September 15, 1994	December 9, 1994	1994
Sotsugyō II: Neo Generation Special	Fill-in-Cafe	Shar Rock	November 22, 1995^{JP}	Unreleased	November 22, 1995	Unreleased
Sotsugyō: Graduation Final	Fupac	Shar Rock	December 9, 1994^{JP}	Unreleased	December 9, 1994	Unreleased
Space Ace	ReadySoft	ReadySoft	July 17, 1995^{NA}	July 17, 1995	Unreleased	Unreleased
Space Hulk: Vengeance of the Blood Angels	Key Game	Electronic Arts; Electronic Arts Victor (JP)	September 13, 1995^{NA}	September 13, 1995	December 1, 1995	1995
Space Pirates	American Laser Games	American Laser Games	June 26, 1995^{NA}	June 26, 1995	Unreleased	Unreleased
Space Shuttle	Amazing Media	The Software Toolworks	October 6, 1994^{NA}	October 6, 1994	Unreleased	1994
Star Control II	Toys For Bob	Crystal Dynamics (NA); BMG Interactive	September 26, 1994^{NA}	September 26, 1994	March 24, 1995	1994
Star Fighter	Krisalis Software	The 3DO Company	1995^{PAL}	November 30, 1995	Unreleased	1995
Star Wars: Rebel Assault	LucasArts	LucasArts (NA); Electronic Arts (PAL); Electronic Arts Victor (JP)	December 1, 1994^{NA}	December 1, 1994	February 17, 1995	1994
Starblade	HighTech Lab. Japan	Panasonic; Namco (JP)	December 15, 1994^{NA}	December 15, 1994	December 16, 1994	1994
Stellar 7: Draxon's Revenge	Dynamix	Dynamix (NA); T&E Soft (JP)	January 1994^{NA}	January 1994	March 20, 1994	Unreleased
Strahl	Media Entertainment	Panasonic (NA); Media Entertainment (JP)	December 2, 1994^{JP}	July 6, 1995	December 2, 1994	Unreleased
Striker: World Cup Special	Rage Software	Coconuts Japan Entertainment JP; Panasonic PAL	May 19, 1995^{JP PAL}	Unreleased	May 19, 1995	May 19, 1995
Super Real Mahjong P V	SETA Corporation	SETA Corporation	December 15, 1995^{JP}	Unreleased	December 15, 1995	Unreleased
Super Real Mahjong PIV + Aishō Shindan	Opus Studio	SETA Corporation	March 10, 1995^{JP}	Unreleased	March 10, 1995	Unreleased
Super Street Fighter II Turbo	Capcom	Panasonic; Capcom JP	November 7, 1994^{NA}	November 7, 1994	November 14, 1994	November 23, 1994
Super Wing Commander	Origin Systems	Origin Systems (NA); Electronic Arts (PAL); Electronic Arts Victor (JP)	May 15, 1994^{NA}	May 15, 1994	July 9, 1994	1994
Supreme Warrior	Digital Pictures	Acclaim Distribution (NA); Acclaim Japan (JP)	August 25, 1994^{JP}	November 1, 1994	August 25, 1994	Unreleased
Syndicate	Bullfrog Productions	Electronic Arts; Electronic Arts Victor (JP)	June 9, 1995^{NA}	June 9, 1995	October 20, 1995	1995
Taiketsu! Rooms	Sanyei Shobou	Sanyo	August 7, 1995^{JP}	Unreleased	August 7, 1995	Unreleased
Tanjō: Debut Pure	Fill-in-Cafe	Shar Rock	March 22, 1996^{JP}	Unreleased	March 22, 1996	Unreleased
Terasawa Takeichi no Takeru	Fun Project	Panasonic	April 29, 1994^{JP}	Unreleased	April 29, 1994	Unreleased
Theatre Wars: Goraku no Dendō	Scitron & Art	Hamlet	May 14, 1994^{JP}	Unreleased	May 14, 1994	Unreleased
Theme Park	Bullfrog Productions	Electronic Arts; Electronic Arts Victor (JP)	January 15, 1995^{NA}	January 15, 1995	July 21, 1995	1995
Toki o Koeta Tegami: The Letter That Over Came Time	Thinking Rabbit	Panasonic	May 28, 1994^{JP}	Unreleased	May 28, 1994	Unreleased
Tokimeki Mahjong Paradise Special	Sonnet Computer Entertainment	Sonnet Computer Entertainment	March 1, 1996^{JP}	Unreleased	March 1, 1996	Unreleased
Total Eclipse	Crystal Dynamics	Crystal Dynamics; Byse, Inc. (JP)	January 8, 1994^{NA}	January 8, 1994	March 26, 1994	1994
Totsugeki Kikan (Karakuri) Megadasu!!	Warp	Warp	December 16, 1994^{JP}	Unreleased	December 16, 1994	Unreleased
The Tower	OpenBook Co., Ltd.	OpenBook Co., Ltd.	March 8, 1996^{JP}	Unreleased	March 8, 1996	Unreleased
Trip'd	Warp	Panasonic; Sanei Shobo Publishing (JP)	August 6, 1994^{JP}	July 15, 1995	August 6, 1994	1995
Twinkle Knights	Axes Art Amuse	Intarus	March 17, 1995^{JP}	Unreleased	March 17, 1995	Unreleased
Twisted: The Game Show	Studio 3DO	Electronic Arts; Electronic Arts Victor (JP)	April 15, 1994^{NA}	April 15, 1994	December 23, 1994	1994
Uchuu Seibutsu Flopon-kun	WARP	Sanyei Shobou	August 6, 1994^{JP}	Unreleased	August 6, 1994	Unreleased
Ultraman Powered	Tose	Bandai	March 20, 1994^{JP}	Unreleased	March 20, 1994	Unreleased
V-Goal Soccer '96	Tecmo	Tecmo	March 22, 1996^{JP}	Unreleased	March 22, 1996	Unreleased
Virtual Cameraman Part 1: Sawada Naomi and Juri Anna	Naxat Soft	Trans-Pegasus Limited	February 17, 1995^{JP}	Unreleased	February 17, 1995	Unreleased
Virtual Cameraman Part 2: Kawai Natsumi and Tachihara Kimi	Naxat Soft	Trans-Pegasus Limited	March 24, 1995^{JP}	Unreleased	March 24, 1995	Unreleased
Virtual Cameraman Part 3: Sugimoto Yumika	Naxat Soft	Trans-Pegasus Limited	April 28, 1995^{JP}	Unreleased	April 28, 1995	Unreleased
Virtual Cameraman Part 4: Fujitani Shiori	Naxat Soft	Trans-Pegasus Limited	June 2, 1995^{JP}	Unreleased	June 2, 1995	Unreleased
Virtual Cameraman Part 5: Ando Ari	Naxat Soft	Trans-Pegasus Limited	June 30, 1995^{JP}	Unreleased	June 30, 1995	Unreleased
Virtuoso	MotiveTime Ltd.	Data East (NA); Elite Systems (PAL); Imagineer (JP)	July 6, 1995^{NA}	July 6, 1995	September 1, 1995	1995
VR Stalker	Morpheus Interactive	American Laser Games	October 13, 1994^{NA}	October 13, 1994	Unreleased	1995
Waialae Country Club	T&E Soft	Panasonic(NA); T&E Soft (JP)	October 20, 1994^{NA}	October 20, 1994	October 28, 1994	1994
Way of the Warrior	Naughty Dog	Universal Interactive Studios	August 30, 1994^{NA}	August 30, 1994	May 26, 1995	1994
Who Shot Johnny Rock?	American Laser Games	American Laser Games	June 21, 1994^{NA}	June 21, 1994	Unreleased	Unreleased
Wicked 18	T&E Soft	Panasonic	March 28, 1995^{NA}	March 28, 1995	April 14, 1995	Unreleased
Wing Commander III: Heart of the Tiger	Origin Systems	Origin Systems	June 12, 1995^{NA}	June 12, 1995	Unreleased	1995
Winning Post	Koei	Koei	September 16, 1994^{JP}	Unreleased	September 16, 1994	Unreleased
Wolfenstein 3D	Logicware	Interplay Productions; Electronic Arts Victor (JP)	October 19, 1995^{NA}	October 19, 1995	December 15, 1995	Unreleased
World Cup Golf: Hyatt Dorado Beach	Arc Developments	U.S. Gold	November 15, 1994^{NA}	November 15, 1994	Unreleased	1994
The Yakyūken Special	Societa	Societa Daikanyama	November 11, 1994^{JP}	Unreleased	November 11, 1994	Unreleased
Yamamura Misa Suspense: Kyōto Anba Sansō Satsujin Jiken	Tose	Pack-In-Video	March 20, 1994^{JP}	Unreleased	March 20, 1994	Unreleased
Yū Yū Hakusho	Hudson Soft, Tose	Tomy	December 23, 1994^{JP}	Unreleased	December 23, 1994	Unreleased
Zhadnost: The People's Party	Studio 3DO	The 3DO Company	March 2, 1995	March 2, 1995	Unreleased	1995

== Non-game software and Compilations ==
Title	Genre(s)	Developer(s)	Publisher(s)	Year	Notes						
Title	Genre(s)	Developer(s)	Publisher(s)	Year	Notes	3D Atlas	Non-game, Edutainment	The MultiMedia Corporation	Electronic Arts	1994	NA, PAL
3DO Action Pak	Compilation	—N/a	The 3DO Company	1995	NA						
3DO Buffet	Demodisc	Interplay Productions	The 3DO Company	April 27, 1995	NA						
3DO Game Guru	Non-game	Symbiosis Media	The 3DO Company	1995	NA, PAL						
3DO Interactive Sampler	Demodisc	The 3DO Company	The 3DO Company	1994	NA						
3DO Interactive Sampler 2	Demodisc	The 3DO Company	The 3DO Company	1994	NA						
3DO Interactive Sampler 3	Demodisc	The 3DO Company	The 3DO Company	1995	NA						
3DO Interactive Sampler 4	Demodisc	The 3DO Company	The 3DO Company	1995	NA						
3DO Maniac Pack	Compilation	—N/a	Interplay Productions	1995	NA						
20th Century Video Almanac	Non-game, Edutainment	The Software Toolworks	The Software Toolworks	1994	NA						
Battery Navi	Dai Nippon Printing	Dai Nippon Printing	October 13, 1995^{JP}	1995	JP						
Blonde Justice	Non-game, Adult, Interactive movie	Vivid Interactive	Vivid Interactive	1994	NA, PAL						
Bodyconscious Digital Rave! Part 1: Shinjuku & Takashi	Non-game, Adult, Interactive movie	Trans-Pegasus Limited	Trans-Pegasus Limited	December 23, 1994	JP						
Chizu Monogatari: Sono 1	Non-game	Byse, Inc.	Ariadne	October 27, 1995	JP						
The Coven	Non-game, Adult, Interactive movie	Vivid Interactive	Vivid Interactive	1994	NA						
Dennis Miller: That's News to Me	Non-game, Edutainment	Sanctuary Woods	Sanctuary Woods	December 31, 1994	NA						
Dennō Hyōryū: Multimedia Cruising	Non-game, Art Game	Scitron & Art	Hamlet	May 19, 1995	JP						
Digital Dreamware	Music	Virgin Interactive	Virgin Interactive	1995	NA, PAL						
Endlessly	Non-game, Adult, Interactive movie	Vivid Interactive	Vivid Interactive	1995	NA						
ESPN Baseball: Interactive Hitting	Edutainment, Sports	Intellimedia Sports	IntelliPlay	1994	NA						
ESPN Golf: Lower Your Score with Tom Kite - Shot Making	Edutainment, Sports	Intellimedia Sports	IntelliPlay (NA); Byse, Inc. (JP)	January 1, 1994	NA, JP						
ESPN Golf: Lower Your Score with Tom Kite - Mental Messages	Edutainment, Sports	Intellimedia Sports	IntelliPlay	1994	NA						
ESPN Let's Go Skiing	Edutainment, Sports	ESPN Enterprises, Intellimedia Sports	IntelliPlay	1994	NA						
ESPN Let's Play Beach Volleyball	Edutainment, Sports	Intellimedia Sports	IntelliPlay	1994	NA						
ESPN Let's Play Soccer	Edutainment, Sports	ESPN Enterprises, Intellimedia Sports	IntelliPlay	1994	NA						
ESPN Let's Play Tennis	Edutainment, Sports	ESPN Enterprises, Intellimedia Sports	IntelliPlay	1994	NA						
ESPN Step Aerobics	Edutainment, Sports	ESPN Enterprises, Intellimedia Sports	IntelliPlay	1994	NA						
Golf-jo Multimedia Shinsho: Susuno Country Club Hen	Non-game	JISC Life Support	JISC Life Support	August 3, 1995^{JP}	JP						
Grimm Meisaku Gekijō: Akazukin	Non-game, Interactive movie	JASPAC	Ima Company	September 2, 1994	JP						
Grimm Meisaku Gekijō: Bremen no Ongakutai	Non-game, Interactive movie	JASPAC	Ima Company	September 2, 1994	JP						
Grimm Meisaku Gekijō: Hansel to Gretel	Non-game, Interactive movie	JASPAC	Ima Company	September 2, 1994	JP						
Gunslinger Collection	Compilation	American Laser Games	American Laser Games	1995	NA						
Hirata Shōgo Interactive Ehon: Aesop Monogatari Vol. 1	Non-game, Edutainment, Interactive movie	Elcom	Elcom	November 3, 1994	JP						
Hirata Shōgo Interactive Ehon: Cinderella	Non-game, Edutainment, Interactive movie	Elcom	Elcom	January 13, 1995	JP						
Hirata Shōgo Interactive Ehon: Ningyo Hime	Non-game, Edutainment, Interactive movie	Elcom	Elcom	December 2, 1994	JP						
Hirata Shōgo Interactive Ehon: Ookami to Shichi Hiki no Koyagi	Non-game, Edutainment, Interactive movie	Elcom	Elcom	January 13, 1995	JP						
Hirata Shōgo Interactive Ehon: Sanhiki no Kabuta	Non-game, Edutainment, Interactive movie	Elcom	Elcom	December 2, 1994	JP						
Hirata Shōgo Interactive Ehon: Shirayuki Hime	Non-game, Edutainment, Interactive movie	Elcom	Elcom	November 3, 1994	JP						
Immortal Desire	Non-game, Adult, Interactive movie	Vivid Interactive	Vivid Interactive	1994	NA, PAL						
Jieitai World	Non-game, Edutainment	Opera House	Japan Vistec	1995	JP						
Keiba Saishō no Hōsoku	Non-game	Copya System	Copya System	October 21, 1994^{JP}	JP						
Kyūsei Senjutsu Niyoru Heisei Kaiun Koyomi	Non-game	Ariadne	Ariadne	December 9, 1994	JP						
The Life Stage: Virtual House	Non-game	Microcabin	Panasonic	March 20, 1994^{NA JP}	NA, JP						
Love Bites	Non-game, Adult, Interactive movie	Vivid Interactive	Vivid Interactive	1995	NA						
Marine Tour	Non-game	Office Create	Office Create	August 6, 1994	JP						
Mathemagics	Non-game, Edutainment	L3 Interactive	The 3DO Company	1994	NA						
Multimedia Shinsho: Driving School - Futsū Menkyoka Hen	Non-game	JISC Life Support	JISC Life Support	October 25, 1995^{JP}	JP						
Nais How's 1 - Front How's '95-'96	Non-game	A&i Games, National Human Electronics	A&i Games, National Human Electronics	January 8, 1995	JP						
Naoko to Hide Bō: Kanji no Tensai 1	Non-game, Edutainment	Gakuman	Gakuman	March 10, 1995	JP						
Naoko to Hide Bō: Sansū no Tensai 1	Non-game, Edutainment	Gakuman	Gakuman	March 10, 1995	JP						
Naoko to Hide Bō: Sansū no Tensai 2	Non-game, Edutainment	Gakuman	Gakuman	March 10, 1995	JP						
New How's 1 - Front How's '94-'95	Non-game	A&i Games, National Human Electronics	A&i Games, National Human Electronics	1994	JP						
Oceans Below	Non-game, Edutainment	Amazing Media	The Software Toolworks; Multisoft (JP)	1995	NA, JP						
Ogura Hyakunin Isshu	Non-game, Edutainment	Shinko Human Create	Bunsoft	May 26, 1995	JP						
Paddock Note '95	Non-game	Scitron & Art	Fuji Television	April 14, 1995^{JP}	JP						
Penthouse Interactive Virtual Photo Shoot Vol. 1	Non-game, Adult	Apollon	Apollon, Bunkasha, GAGA Communications	December 23, 1994	JP						
Peperon Mura no Shiki	Non-game, Edutainment	Marubeni, Mitsumasa Anno, NHK	Marubeni Corporation, NHK	October 20, 1995	JP						
Policenauts Pilot Disk	Demodisc	Konami	Konami	April 21, 1995	JP						
Sample This!	Demodisc	Crystal Dynamics	Crystal Dynamics	1994	NA						
San Diego Zoo Presents: The Animals!	Non-game, Edutainment	Arnowitz Studios	The Software Toolworks	1994	NA						
Secre: Fūmin no Omocha Hako	Non-game	Glams Interactive Labo	Glams Interactive Labo	August 27, 1994	JP						
Seimei Handan	Non-game	Ariadne	Ariadne	February 17, 1995	JP						
Sex	Non-game, Adult, Interactive movie	Vivid Interactive	Vivid Interactive	1995	NA, PAL						
Sid Meier's C.P.U. Bach	Music	MicroProse	MicroProse	1994	NA						
Slopestyle	Non-game, Edutainment	L3 Interactive	L3 Interactive	1994	NA						
Super Model Gail McKenna	Non-Game, Adult, Interactive movie	Digital Production	Trans-Pegasus Limited	January 28, 1995	JP						
SuperModels Go Wild	Non-game, Adult, Interactive movie	Vivid Interactive	Vivid Interactive	1994	NA, PAL						
Tarot Uranai	Non-game	Axes Art Amuse	Ariadne	January 13, 1995	JP						
ToonTime ...in the classroom	Non-game, Interactive movie	Videoact V LC	Videoact V LC	1994	NA						
Virtual Puppet Reika	Music	h.a.n.d., Kuki Inc.	h.a.n.d.	October 7, 1994	JP						
Virtual Vivid Sampler	Demodisc, Adult	Vivid Interactive	Vivid Interactive	1994	NA						
Woody Woodpecker And Friends Volume One	Non-game, Interactive movie	MCA Universal	MCA Universal	1994	NA						
Woody Woodpecker And Friends Volume Two	Non-game, Interactive movie	MCA Universal	MCA Universal	1994	NA						
Woody Woodpecker And Friends Volume Three	Non-game, Interactive movie	MCA Universal	MCA Universal	1994	NA						
World Cup Super Stadium	Sports	TV Tokyo	GAGA Communications	April 28, 1995	JP						
Yamada Kamachi Bijutsukan: Kamachi's Museum	Non-game, Interactive movie	System Sacom	TV Asahi	June 9, 1995^{JP}	JP						

== Later Releases ==
Title	Genre(s)	Developer(s)	Publisher(s)	Date first released	Regions released						
Title	Genre(s)	Developer(s)	Publisher(s)	Date first released	Regions released	The Adventures Of Captain J	Space Shooter	World Of Games/Almondtree Games	World Of Games	May 14, 2025	NA
BioFury	First Person Shooter	Retro Love Letter	World Of Games	January 27, 2024	NA						
Double Header: Complete Onside Soccer and Power Slide	Compilation	MotiveTime Ltd.	Good Deal Games	July 28, 2007	NA						
Icebreaker 2	Action, Strategy	Magnet Interactive Studios	OlderGames	July 28, 2007	NA						
OnSide Soccer	Sports	MotiveTime Ltd.	OlderGames	July 28, 2007	NA						
PowerSlide	Racing	Maelstrom Games, MotiveTime Ltd.	OlderGames	July 28, 2007	NA						
3DO Games: Decathlon	Sports	Studio 3DO	OlderGames	July 28, 2007	NA						

== Arcade games ==
Title	Genre(s)	Developer(s)	Publisher(s)	Year	Notes						
Title	Genre(s)	Developer(s)	Publisher(s)	Year	Notes	Beavis and Butt-Head	Action	Atari Games	Time Warner Interactive	1996	The game underwent a location testing in 1996, but was unreleased due to poor reception.
Crime Patrol	Interactive movie, Light gun shooter	American Laser Games	American Laser Games	1994	Some arcade cabinets used the 3DO as the main hardware.						
Die Alien Scum!!	Rail shooter	Atari Games	Time Warner Interactive	1994	Development was halted and the game was left unreleased due to hardware issues.						
Mad Dog II: The Lost Gold	Interactive movie, Light gun shooter	American Laser Games	American Laser Games	1994	Some arcade cabinets used the 3DO as the main hardware.						
Mazer	Run and gun	American Laser Games	American Laser Games	1995	Its arcade cabinet used the 3DO as the main hardware.						
Orbatak	Action	American Laser Games	American Laser Games	1994	Its arcade cabinet used the 3DO as the main hardware.						
Shootout at Old Tucson	Interactive movie, Light gun shooter	American Laser Games	American Laser Games	1994	Its arcade cabinet used the 3DO as the main hardware.						
Way of the Warrior	Fighting	Naughty Dog	American Laser Games	1994	Its arcade cabinet used the 3DO as the main hardware.						

== See also ==
- List of cancelled 3DO Interactive Multiplayer games
- Lists of video games
