= List of cancelled 3DO games =

The 3DO is a video game console released by The 3DO Company. The console was first released in 1993, as one of the first entries in the fifth generation of video game consoles. However, its high price, followed by increased competition from the Sega Saturn and the Sony PlayStation in the following years lead to many game cancellations in the mid-90s, and its eventual discontinuation in 1996. This list documents games that were confirmed for the 3DO at some point, but did not end up being released for it in any capacity.

== List ==
There are currently 70 games on this list. (Note: This number is always up to date by this script.)

List of cancelled 3DO games
Title(s)	Notes/Reasons	Developer	Publisher
The 11th Hour	Originally released for Windows in 1995, the announced Sega Saturn and 3DO versions never materialized.	Trilobyte	Virgin Interactive
Absolute Zero	VideoGames - The Ultimate Gaming Magazine reported in their November 1995 issue that a 3DO version of the 1995 PC release was due by the end of the year, though it never materialized.	Domark	Domark
Alone in the Dark 3	Following the first 2 entries receiving 3DO versions, the third entry was announced for the 3DO as well, though only PC versions ever released in 1995.	Infogrames	Infogrames
Baldies	Originally announced for the 3DO alongside PC platforms and other CD-based game consoles such as the Sega Saturn and the original PlayStation, the 3DO version was the only platform to never materialize upon its 1995 release.	Creative Edge Software	GameTek
Big Red Racing	After being released on PC in 1995, plans for console version were announced, though plans were not discussed after publisher Domark was acquired by Eidos Interactive, and no console versions were released, 3DO included.	Big Red Software	Domark
B.I.O.S.Fear	A 3D adventure game with puzzle and shooting elements in development by a then-newly created development team named Zinc Studios. The game's premise revolved around saving and conserving Earth's resources. Development started in 1994, with early plans involving a tentative release window of mid-to-late 1995. The game slipped past this release window, and was reported still in development as late as May 1996, though its release never materialized in any capacity.	Zinc Studios	All Systems Go Technologies
Blackthorne	Shortly after the game's initial release on SNES in 1994, publisher Interplay Entertainment decided against a Sega Genesis port in favor of concentrating on more powerful hardware. 3DO, Sega 32X, Sega Saturn, and PlayStation versions were announced, though out of those platforms, only the 32X version ever released.	Blizzard Entertainment	Interplay Productions
Blood Omen: Legacy of Kain	Originally scheduled for release in the a fourth quarter of 1995, delays and the game's extended 3 & a half year development time lead to PlayStation and Windows releases across 1996 and 1997, but not on the 3DO nor Sega Saturn.	Crystal Dynamics	Crystal Dynamics
Bubsy in Claws Encounters of the Furred Kind	French magazine Joypad reported that the original Bubsy game was in development for the 3DO, though this never materialized.	Accolade	Accolade
Caesar's World of Gambling	A casino simulation video game was in development for the 3DO until at least mid-1996. While the game never materialized for 3DO, Interplay would later release a series of Caesar branded casino games for various platforms in the late 1990s/early 2000s.		Interplay Entertainment
Cadillacs and Dinosaurs: The Second Cataclysm	A 3DO version of the 1994 PC and Sega CD release was announced at E3 1995, and reported to be coming out "soon" as recently as mid-1996, but never materialized.	Rocket Science Games	BMG Interactive
Chess Wars	A chess video game in the vein of Battle Chess, where chess-move actions were animated with live-action video sequences. Originally announced for PC and 3DO, only the PC version ever materialized by the time the game released in late 1996.	Art Data Interactive	Art Data Interactive
ClayFighter 2: Judgment Clay	A version of the 1995 SNES release was announced for the Sega 32X and the 3DO, though neither alternate version ever materialized.	Interplay Productions	Interplay Productions
ClockWerx	A puzzle video game announced for many platforms; while PC, SNES, Sega Saturn, and original PlayStation versions released across 1995 and 1996, the 3DO version never materialized.	Callisto Corporation	Tokuma Shoten
Command & Conquer	A 3DO version of the game was announced, and reported upon as late as February 1995, though the final game only released on PC platforms, Sega Saturn, the original PlayStation, and eventually the Nintendo 64, across 1995 to 1999.	Westwood Studios	Virgin Interactive
Cyberwar	A story sequel to the film The Lawnmower Man and its respective video game adaption, the game was announced for the Sega 32X, Sega CD, Sega Saturn, and the 3DO, but only the PlayStation and PC platforms ever saw release.		Sales Curve Interactive
Descent	Released on PC platforms in 1995, announced versions for the 3DO, Sega 32X, and Sega Saturn never materialized; the only console version that released was for the PlayStation 1 in 1996.	Parallax Software	Interplay Entertainment
Discworld	A video game adaption of the novel Discworld announced for multiplatform release. 3DO and Sega CD versions were announced and advertised in 1995, but only PC, Sega Saturn, and PlayStation 1 versions ever released across 1995 and 1996.	Perfect Entertainment	Psygnosis
Disruptor	Development of the game began in 1994 as the first game by the newly created Insomniac Games. Production began on the 3DO, as The 3DO company was aggressively courting developers, and the team was new and not able to get dev kits for all platforms yet. Approximately halfway through development, the team became worried about the commercial viability of the 3DO, fearing it may not have a long lifespan, and the team began to contemplate whether they should consider moving development to the then-upcoming platforms by Sega (Sega Saturn) or Sony (PlayStation). The team was eventually persuaded by Mark Cerny to move development to the latter, with the game released in 1996.	Insomniac Games	Universal Interactive Studios
Doom II	A 3DO version of the 1994 multiplatform PC release was announced, and reportedly still coming as late as mid-1996. Despite many console ports releasing in subsequent years, the 3DO version never materialized.	Art Data Interactive	Art Data Interactive
Dragon: The Bruce Lee Story	A 3DO version was announced alongside other platforms at the time of its reveal, but despite the game releasing across 1994 and 1995 on the Master System, Genesis, SNES, and Jaguar, the 3DO version never materialized.	Virgin Interactive	Virgin Interactive
Dragon Ball Z: Cell To Kogeki Da	A Dragon Ball Z licensed fighting game was announced for the 3DO, but never materialized.	Banpresto	Bandai
Dragon's Lair II: Time Warp	A 3DO version was one of many console versions announced for the 1990 PC release; while many released over the years, the 3DO version never did. A non-playable demo was included in the 3DO port of Brain Dead 13.	ReadySoft	ReadySoft
Duelin' Firemen!	An action game with equal emphasis on FMV cutscenes. Announced exclusively for the 3DO, it never released in any capacity.	RUNANDGUN!, Inc.	RUNANDGUN!, Inc.
Fast Draw Showdown	A 3DO version of the 1994 arcade game release was scheduled for release in 1996, but never materialized.	American Laser Games	American Laser Games
Firewolves	Little is known other than that there was a game titled Firewolves scheduled to be published by GoldStar and LG Electronics in video game magazines across 1995 and 1996, though no such title ever released. 3DO Magazine described it as a "mystery project".		GoldStar / LG Electronics
Golden Gate	An adventure game originally announced for the 3DO in 1995, scheduled for release in the end of that year. It was cancelled the following year in favor of a PC release, which eventually occurred outside of the 3DO's lifespan in 1997.	iXL Interactive Excellence	The 3DO Company
Heart of Darkness	The game featured a protracted 6 year development cycle, and over the course of that time, was announced and cancelled for many platforms that became unviable. It was due for release on the 3DO for a period, but after the game lost its publisher in 1996, the game was delayed outside of the 3DO's lifespan, and by the time it released in mid-1998, it only released on PlayStation and Windows.	Amazing Studio	Virgin Interactive
Housekeeper	A Japanese-developed game where the player took control of Tom, who was recently hired to be a housekeeper of a family mansion. Tom has to struggle with both the family's eccentricities and the supernatural effects of a poltergeist to figure out the secret of the mansion. The game was far enough along to have advertisements run in magazines in 1996, though the game never materialized in any capacity.	HummingBirdSoft	Panasonic
In Your Face	Announced in 1995 and included on various release schedules for 3DO into 1996, little was revealed about the title other than it being developed by new upstart company "Meta-Design".	Meta-Design	
Ishar 3: The Seven Gates of Infinity	A version of the 1994 PC release was announced for the 3DO, but never materialized.	Silmarils	ReadySoft
Isis	A game similar to Myst listed as in development for the 3DO in 1996, the game never materialized.		Panasonic
Loadstar: The Legend of Tully Bodine	Originally released for the Sega CD and MS-DOS in 1994 & 1995 respectively, a 3DO version was announced during E3 1995, but never materialized.	Rocket Science Games	BMG Interactive
The Lost Vikings 2	Originally announced at E3 1995 for the 3DO, SNES, Sega Saturn, and the original PlayStation, its eventual 1997 release occurred well outside of the 3DO's lifespan, thus never releasing it for the platform.	Beam Software	Interplay Productions
Magic Carpet	Originally released on PC in 1994, console versions for the 3DO, Sega Saturn, and the original PlayStation were announced, though the 3DO version never materialized when the other versions release in 1996.	Bullfrog Productions	Electronic Arts
Maximum Surge	A FMV game announced for 3DO, Sega Saturn, and PC platforms, the game never released, though some video footage was recycled into the 2003 film Game Over.	Digital Pictures	Acclaim
McKenzie & Co	A 3DO version of the 1995 PC dating sim release was announced and remained on release schedules in 1996, but never materialized.	HeR Interactive	American Laser Games
Mega Man X3	A 3DO version of the 1995 SNES game was announced in Japanese magazines (under its Japanese name, Rockman X3), but it never materialized, with future version only coming to Sega Saturn, PlayStation, and PC in the following years.	Capcom	Capcom
Metal Gear Solid	The earliest work on a third Metal Gear entry was started in 1994 on the 3DO, while wrapping up development of Policenauts (1994). Early on, development shifted over to the original PlayStation, where it turned into what would become Metal Gear Solid, which released in 1998, well beyond the 3DO's lifespan. Early concept artwork from its 3DO development phase done by Yoji Shinkawa exists in Policenauts Pilot Disk.	Konami	Konami
Mieko - A Story of Japanese Culture	A game listed as "in production" for the 3DO and due for release in late 1994 or early 1995 that never materialized.	Digital Production	Digital Production
Mirage	A 3DO version of the 1995 PC puzzle video game was announced, but never materialized.	The Dream Designers	Atlantis Interactive
Mortal Kombat 3	A version of the 1995 arcade game was announced for the 3DO. The 3DO version was reportedly complete, and scheduled for early 1996, but Sony signed a timed exclusive contract with Midway Games for the publishing of the game on 32-bit video game consoles, delaying the release out of the 3DO's lifespan.	Midway Games	Panasonic
NHL 96	While the SNES, Sega Genesis, and PC versions all released in late 1995, the 32-bit versions for the 3DO and the original PlayStation were delayed, and later cancelled, due to quality issues.	Electronic Arts	Electronic Arts
Orbatak	A version of the 1994 arcade game was announced for the 3DO, but never materialized.	American Laser Games	American Laser Games
Penn & Teller's Smoke and Mirrors	Similar to the video Penn & Teller's Cruel Tricks for Dear Friends (1987), the game was to be centered around mini-games where the player could cheat and deceive their friends. In addition to a Sega CD version, a 3DO version was announced at E3 1995. The game was far along in its development for review copies of the Sega CD version to be distributed to multiple magazines, but its release was cancelled when publisher Absolute Entertainment abruptly went bankrupt and the developers were unable to find another publisher willing to publish the game for both versions due to their poor market status. One of the review copies of the Sega CD version leaked onto the internet in 2005 and the game found a cult following for its off-beat gameplay ideas.	Imagineering	Absolute Entertainment
Pitfall: The Mayan Adventure	While widely released on 16-bit consoles across 1994 and 1995, many of the announced 32-bit versions, including a 3DO version, never materialized.		Activision
Prowler	A futuristic game where the player pilots combat vehicles to fight off invaders and carry out missions. The game was announced for the 3DO and listed as in development with a "TBA" release date into 1996, the game never released in any capacity.	Origin Systems	Electronic Arts
Rad The Rock Hopper	Listed on a E3 1995 press release by the 3DO Company, as one of many titles in development for the 3DO, little else was revealed about the game. It remained on magazine release schedules into 1996, but never materialized in any capacity.	Crystal Oasis	
Rayman	Throughout the game's lengthy planning and development period in the late 1980s and early 1990s, the game was planned for a number of platforms that it never released on, including the 32X, SNES, and the 3DO.	Ubi Pictures	Ubi Soft
Return to Zork	A 3DO version of the 1993 release was announced, but never materialized.	Activision	Activision
Rock n' Roll Racing	A 3DO version of the 1993 SNES and Sega Genesis release was announced at E3 1995, but never materialized.	Silicon & Synapse	Interplay Productions
Scorched Earth	Little was revealed about the title other than it was listed as a game in development by Electronic Arts for the 3DO at the time of the console's May 1993 reveal.	Electronic Arts	Electronic Arts
The Scottish Open: Virtual Golf	Originally announced for 3DO, Sega 32X, Sega Saturn, and the original PlayStation, the 3DO and 32X versions were cancelled, while the Saturn and PlayStation version were eventually released under the shortened title Virtual Golf in late 1996.	Core Design	Core Design
Shellshock	Originally announced for the 3DO, MS-DOS, Sega Saturn, and the original PlayStation, only the 3DO version never released when all other versions released across 1996.	Core Design	U.S. Gold
Shootout at Old Tucson	A 3DO version of the 1994 arcade game release was announced, but never materialized.	American Laser Games	American Laser Games
Shredfest / Face Plant	A spin-off of the Road Rash series that involved racing and fighting while snowboarding rather than Road Rash's motorcycling. Originally in development for the Sega Genesis under the name Face Plant across 1993 and 1994, it was cancelled in 1995 in favor of shifting development to the newer Sega Saturn, PlayStation, and 3DO platforms. While development continued into 1996 under the new name Shredfest, it was eventually cancelled for those platforms as well.	Monkey Do Productions	Electronic Arts Studios
Slam City with Scottie Pippen	A 3DO version of the 1994 Sega CD, 32X, and MS-DOS release was announced, but never materialized.	Digital Pictures	Acclaim
Solvalou	A 3DO version of the 1991 arcade game was announceded early in the 3DO's lifespan, but never materialized.	Namco	Namco
Soviet Strike / 32-bit Strike	Development began in 1994 for the 3DO under the tentative title 32-bit Strike. While a few months of work was done on this version, when the development team realized that the 3DO would not be a viable platform by the time the game would be release due to its commercial struggles, it was then cancelled in favor of PlayStation and Sega Saturn versions that were released across 1996 and 1997.	Electronic Arts	Electronic Arts
SSN-21 Seawolf	A 3DO version of the 1994 MS-DOS submarine simulation game was announced, but never materialized.	John W. Ratcliff	Electronic Arts
Star Trek: The Next Generation – A World for All Seasons	An original video game in development exclusively for the 3DO, based on the Star Trek: The Next Generation television series. The game would have played as an interactive movie and a choose your own adventure game. The game was never completed and never released in any capacity.	Spectrum HoloByte	Spectrum HoloByte
Star Wars Chess	A 3DO version of the Star Wars themed chess game was announced for a 3DO release following its 1993 PC and Sega CD release, though it never materialized.	The Software Toolworks	Mindscape
Tigernaut: Beyond the Stars	A game title found on various 3DO release schedules across 1994 up to 1996, but never released in any capacity.	Videoact V LC	Videoact V LC
Tomb Raider	In its earliest planning stages, the 3DO and Atari Jaguar were targeted as platforms, but development shifted away from them early on, with development and release only occurring on Sega Saturn, PlayStation, and PC platforms in late 1996.	Core Design	Eidos Interactive
Ultimate Mortal Kombat 3	While the 1995 arcade game was brought to many active home video game consoles at the time, the announced 3DO version never materialized. In the July 1996 issues of GamePro indicated that the 3DO build was only 10% complete at the time, at the point in which the console was already getting towards the end of its lifespan.	New Level Software	Panasonic
Varuna's Forces	The game experienced a lengthy development period throughout the mid-1990s that expanded beyond the lifespan of many of its platforms, including the 3DO, Atari Jaguar, and Sega Saturn platforms. The game was eventually cancelled from even from its later planned Dreamcast and PC releases, and never released in any capacity.	Accent Media Productions	JVCKenwood
Walker	A 3DO version of the 1993 Amiga release was announced, but never materialized.	DMA Design	Psygnosis
Waterworld	A variety of video game adaptions of the 1995 film of the same name were announced for release around the time of the film. While versions for Nintendo platforms released such as SNES, Game Boy, and even Virtual Boy, none of the announced versions for the 3DO or various Sega platforms, such as Sega Saturn, 32X, and Sega Genesis, ever saw released.	Ocean Software	Interplay Productions
Wing Commander IV: The Price of Freedom	Originally targeting a 3DO release in 1995, its original plans were eventually delayed going into 1996 and 1997, well beyond the 3DO's lifespan, with the game only saw release on PlayStation and PC platforms.	Origin Systems	Electronic Arts
Wing Nuts: Battle in the Sky	A 3DO version of the 1995 release was announced at E3 1995, but never materialized.	Rocket Science Games	BMG Interactive

== See also ==
- List of 3DO games
- Lists of video games
