= Mansion of Hidden Souls =

Mansion of Hidden Souls may refer to:

- Mansion of Hidden Souls (Sega CD video game), a 1993 video game
- The Mansion of Hidden Souls (Sega Saturn video game), a 1994 video game
