= Lunacy (video game) =

1996 video game

- Developer: System Sacom
- Publishers: JP/PAL: Sega; NA: Atlus Software
- Director: Hiroyuki Naruhama
- Designer: Kaori Tsuchiya (planning)
- Artists: Noriko Takeda, Koh Okamura
- Writers: Kenji Takemoto (story); Kenichi Tanigawa, Nobuhiro Miura (English version)
- Platform: Sega Saturn
- Release: JP: June 28, 1996; NA: May 5, 1997; PAL: March 27, 1997
- Genres: Adventure; Interactive movie
- Mode: Single-player

Lunacy, released in Europe as Torico and in Japan as Gekka Mugentan Torico (月花霧幻譚 Torico), is an adventure game developed by System Sacom and published by Sega for the Sega Saturn in 1996. Lunacy is an interactive movie adventure consisting of a long series of interconnecting full motion video (FMV) sequences, much like The 7th Guest and System Sacom's earlier Saturn game, The Mansion of Hidden Souls. The game is about a man named Fred (also known as "The Traveler") who wanders around the City of Mists trying to uncover his forgotten identity. His forehead bears the imprint of a strange symbol, which seems to be the source of his amnesia. He travels to a city, where he encounters strange events and a man named Lord Gordon who rules the town with an iron fist and plays cruel games with the town's inhabitants.

== Storyline ==
Fred, the protagonist of Lunacy

A traveler called Fred finds himself imprisoned in Misty Town jail. He came to the village in search of answers to his past, a past of which he has no recollection. On his head, he bears a crescent shaped tattoo. In his cell, Fred meets the strange and seemingly all-knowing Anthony, who tells him of the legends of the City of Moons. It is said that the road to the City lies through the Misty Town. Anthony offers him the key to his cell, but after an attempted escape, Fred quickly finds himself back in the hands of Lord Gordon, the ruthless town ruler.

Lord Gordon condemns the traveler to death, but offers him a chance to save his life. If he can find the entrance to the City of Moons he will be spared. Fred begins his search for the fabled city, shadowed by Lord Gordon's sadistic henchman Jade. Throughout the village he meets the various people that populate the Misty Town, such as the irritable Dr. Morse, the soft-spoken Rose, and the melancholic Gray. A dried up well may or may not hold the key to his mystery and as his quest unfolds, Fred's path will lead him across various items that may serve one magical function or another. Matches, oil, treesap and red paint prove to be an integral part of the puzzle.

== Gameplay ==
A room in the City of Moons

Lunacy is set in two major locations: Misty Town and the City of Moons. Correspondingly, the game is divided into two discs. Once the player finishes disc 1, disc 2 can be accessed and continues from there.

Although the game maintains the illusion of free three-dimensional movement, in reality each action loads a pre-scripted FMV sequence. Gameplay is essentially restricted to moving left and right, forward and backward or moving in to examine certain objects. The story is followed through a first-person perspective. Some events may not trigger until Fred has spoken to one of the townspeople. Items can be collected and every important encounter is stored in a memory log. The player can save progress anywhere, anytime.

While the storyline of disc 1 follows a fairly linear course, disc 2 allows for multiple outcomes to the game, depending on what choices the player makes at a given moment or which items are used.

== Development ==
System Sacom previously developed the Sega CD game Mansion of Hidden Souls (1993) and later Saturn game, The Mansion of Hidden Souls (1994) which was also a first person adventure title.

Though Atlus USA published Lunacy in North America, the game was translated and localized by Sega. Sega offered the game's North American publication rights to third party companies so that they could devote more of their marketing efforts to more high-profile games.

== Reception ==
Reception

Review scores
Publication	Score
Electronic Gaming Monthly	5.625/10
GameFan	91/100
GameSpot	5.8/10
Next Generation	3/5
Sega Saturn Magazine (UK)	66%
MAN!AC	60/100

Though Lunacy met with a range of critical opinions, reviews almost universally agreed that the game combines compelling story elements and graphics with the limited gameplay typical of the interactive movie genre. Critics particularly remarked that the graphics are exceptionally detailed and effectively bring to life the surreal settings, though some criticized that the characters' walking animations look fake. Most critics disapproved of the gameplay, particularly that the puzzles are shallow and insultingly easy, an insult deepened by the hints given out by the characters. Next Generation reviewed the Sega Saturn version of the game from Japan, rating it four stars out of five, and stated that "The mere fact that the game simply keeps moving at its own irresistible pace is enough to keep players pressing on in their quest to uncover its secrets. Torico is a must for all graphic adventure fans."

The game's bizarre and often cryptic dialogue was the subject of considerable commentary and varying reactions. Glenn Rubenstein in GameSpot described the dialogue as "David Lynch meets David Mamet" Some found it intriguing, while others characterized it as confusing or stilted in a manner suggestive of English being spoken as a second language. The English dub was praised for the quality of the acting but criticized for the poor lip syncing, typically both by the same critic. Reviewing an import copy, Diehard GameFan's reviewers said the game was a rare example of an FMV game done right, praising the graphics, music and setting. Most of Electronic Gaming Monthly's four reviewers found the game too slow-paced and mundane, especially in its first half, though Dan Hsu had a mildly positive response, remarking that "Lunacy brings a bit of variety to a market packed with game clones." Stephen Fulljames gave it a negative review in Sega Saturn Magazine, asserting that "'interactive movies' will never be as exciting or playable as something generated in real time." A reviewer for Next Generation concluded, "Although not a very deep title, Lunacy is just stylish enough to be as entertaining as a good late night movie or suspense novel." Rubenstein similarly said that it was not really a game, but that it "makes up for its lack of interactivity with sheer entertainment value." GamePro was most enthusiastic about the game, scoring it a 4.0 out of 5 in graphics and funfactor and a perfect 5.0 in sound and control, summarizing that "This slick, creepy game combines D's eerie, latent sensuality with Myst's otherworldliness to create a challenging, captivating, movie-like mystery."

== See also ==
- Shadow of Memories
