= Zaboo =

Zaboo may refer to:

- Zaboo, a character in the web series The Guild
- Zaboo, a character in the video game Lunacy

== See also ==
- Zabu, a fictional saber-toothed tiger in Marvel Comics
