= Astronōka =

1998 video game

- Cover art
- Developers: MuuMuu, System Sacom
- Publisher: Enix
- Platform: PlayStation
- Release: JP: August 27, 1998
- Genres: Strategy, simulation
- Mode: Single-player

Astronōka (Japanese: アストロノーカ, Hepburn: Asutoronōka) is a 1998 farm simulation game developed by MuuMuu and System Sacom. It was released in Japan only.

== Gameplay ==
A Baboo as it appears in the game.

Astronōka is described as a "space vegetable production and pest control game". The game revolves around the player cultivating vegetables on a fictional, futuristic star system. The objective is to win vegetable contests and eventually the All-Universe Vegetable Competition, while setting traps and defense to protect the farm in a tower defense style gameplay section against a species of pest called Baboo (バブー).

== Release ==
The game was published by Enix for the PlayStation console on August 27, 1998, and by Square Enix on the PlayStation Network on June 25, 2008.

The original Japanese release of Star Ocean: The Second Story was bundled exclusively with a third disc containing a playable demo of Astronōka.

The Astronōka Original Soundtrack was published by Media Ring on September 2, 1998. It bears the catalog number MGCD-1063.

An anime series titled Baboo Factory (バブーファクトリー) was produced by Enix and broadcast on TV Asahi from 2001 to 2002 as part of the cooking program Wagamanma Kitchen. Each episode lasts one minute. Merchandise such as stickers, badges, mobile straps and mobile phone content based on Baboo were also produced.

Cosmogurashi: Online Teki Yasai Seikatsu, a massively multiplayer online game based in the Astronōka universe, was developed by MuuMuu, MicroVision and Community Engine and published by Enix on March 28, 2003. The online servers were terminated on April 25, 2005.

== Reception ==
Famitsu magazine gave it a 34 out of 40 score.
