= Lucienne's Quest =

3DO and Sega Saturn role-playing video game

- Developer: Microcabin
- Publishers: JP: Microcabin; NA: Panasonic
- Programmer: Katsuya Nagai
- Writer: Megumi Hayasiba
- Composer: Tadahiro Nitta
- Platforms: 3DO, Sega Saturn
- Release: 3DO: JP: 14 September 1995; NA: March 1996; Sega Saturn: JP: 31 May 1996
- Genre: Role-playing
- Mode: Single-player

Lucienne's Quest (Note: Also known as Sword & Sorcery (Japanese: ソードアンドソーサリー, Hepburn: Sōdo Ando Sōserī) in Japan.) is a role-playing video game developed by Microcabin for the 3DO, and is the sole traditional Japanese role-playing game released for the system. The story follows Lucienne, a teenage girl who sets off on an adventure to find a cure for a man's lycanthropy. Between adventuring from town to town and exploring the world, the player must battle with enemies using a turn-based battle system on an isometric grid.

Lucienne's Quest was first released in Japan in 1995 before being localized for a North American release the following year along with a Sega Saturn port in Japan. Critics gave mixed reviews. Some appreciated the game's light-hearted story, simple game mechanics, and short length, but many found the experience unfulfilling compared to the deeper and more complex RPGs of the time. Lucienne's Quest is considered one of the best 3DO games in retrospect, and the North American release has become an expensive collector's item.

== Gameplay ==

Top: Lucienne exploring the map.
Bottom: A battle taking place.
(3DO version showcased)

Lucienne's Quest is a standard Japanese role-playing game. The player controls the main character Lucienne as she adventures from town to town with others to find a cure for Ago, a man cursed as a werewolf. The game has a day/night cycle, which affects when Ago is in human or wolf form, changing his strength in battle. At each town, Lucienne can take on quests to help the town's citizens, buy new equipment, and explore dungeons. Every few towns, the player gains a new party member and the plot thickens. When exploring towns and dungeons, the player can destroy objects in the environment to clear paths and get items.

The battle system is similar to Suikoden (1995), taking place from an isometric perspective on a grid with turn-based actions. Although the player can attack anyone from any location on the map, the battle fields are littered with obstacles that block attacks. Every weapon has both a statistic to measure its effectiveness at attacking enemies and one to measure its ability to destroy obstacles. Some characters can also use magic and summon spirits that act as secondary attacks but also give items and gold to the player.

=== Plot ===
The story of Lucienne's Quest is notably simple. The teenaged Lucienne is left in charge of watching her master's tower while he is away. A man named Ago arrives at the tower looking for Lucienne's master to get a cure for his lycanthropy. The two decide to set off on an adventure to search for a cure. Along their journey, they help people of other towns with their dilemmas and gain party members to help their cause.

== Development and release ==
Lucienne's Quest was developed by Microcabin for the 3DO. It was the team's third 3D role-playing game after Powers Kingdom (a.k.a. Guardian War) and Mystaria: The Realms of Lore (a.k.a. Blazing Heroes). It was released on 14 September 1995 in Japan, and later localized by Panasonic for a March 1996 release in North America. The Japanese version requires the kanji buffer RAM only found in Japanese 3DO systems, making it one of the few games that cannot be played on systems from other regions. The game was ported to the Sega Saturn with changes to the graphics, controls, and camera, and released on 31 May 1996 exclusively in Japan.

== Reception ==
Reception

Review scores
Publication	Score
AllGame	4/5 (3DO)
Electronic Gaming Monthly	5/10, 6.5/10, 6.5/10, 7/10 (3DO)
Famitsu	6/10, 5/10, 6/10, 6/10 (SAT)
Game Informer	8/10 (3DO)
GameFan	90/100, 90/100, 90/100 (3DO)
GamePro	11/20 (3DO)
Next Generation	2/5 (3DO)
Game Players	54% (3DO)
Joypad	3/5 (SAT)
Player One	92% (3DO)
Sega Saturn Magazine (JP)	6.0/10 (SAT)
VideoGames	8/10 (3DO)

Lucienne's Quest garnered mixed reviews. Critics found the story not as substantial and fulfilling compared to other RPGs, commenting that it resembled a series of sidequests which the characters had no compelling reason to undertake. The game's writing and dialogue was criticized for its lengthiness and juvenile humor, with a Next Generation critic describing it as "the literary equivalent of having a conversation with a hyperactive 10-year-old." Ryan Lockheart writing in GameFan felt that the light-hearted story lent itself positively to the game's charm, and was overall much more receptive of Lucienne's Quest. He blamed the poor dialogue on the localization effort, saying that Lucienne was more arrogant and mischievous in the original Japanese version, while the English version characterizes her as absent-minded and stupid. Regarding the game's simplicity, critics also considered it excessively short, with most saying they were able to complete it in slightly less than ten hours. Lockheart explained that Lucienne's Quest does have a considerable amount of content, and the short length is due to the game being balanced such that the player does not need to spend any time on grinding.

While both Lockheart and Next Generation found the full polygonal game world moderately impressive, most criticized the graininess of the polygons, though the spell animations in battle were widely complimented. Most reviews also deemed the gameplay mechanics extremely generic, with Next Generation venturing that "a more paint-by-numbers RPG structure is hard to imagine." A GamePro critic found the game weak on every front: "[The] jagged graphics and carousel music, along with the weak story line and unimpressive enemies, really grate on you. You'll be more scared when you realize that you actually paid money for this game." GameFan was much more receptive of the music and graphics overall, calling it one of the best looking and sounding RPGs.

In more general terms, most critics said that the game lacked anything to set it apart from other RPGs, although it has the distinguishing feature of being the sole Japanese role-playing game on the 3DO. (Note: Though there had already been several RPGs released for the 3DO, they were all American-style, even the Japanese-developed Guardian War.) Jeff Lundigran writing in Game Players summarized the general sentiment: "I can't say I hated it either – it never went far enough out on a limb in any direction to give me reason to. This is the first 'placeholder' RPG I think I've ever come across. Practically everything about it is dead average." Lockheart, again writing more positively, said: "Even though Lucienne's Quest has many elements that make it sound like a beginner's RPG, there are more than enough features that could draw even the most season player in, and shouldn't be overlooked by anyone owning a 3DO." Another reviewer at GameFan called it a "charming, well-designed, visually impressive and musically-stunning RPG".

French gaming magazine Joypad deemed the Saturn remake a "catastrophe" and said that along with the PlayStation port of Space Hulk: Vengeance of the Blood Angels, it cast doubt on whether decent conversions of 3DO games were possible. Critics from Sega Saturn Magazine (Japan) echoed reception of the original 3DO version. They called it a simple RPG lacking a gripping story, and felt it may be suitable for gamers looking for an experience akin to older Japanese RPGs for personal computers.

According to Famitsu, Lucienne's Quest on 3DO sold over 20,192 copies in its first week on the market. The game sold approximately 26,784 copies during its lifetime in Japan.

=== Legacy ===
In retrospect, Lucienne's Quest is considered one of the best 3DO games. Listing it among their top ten 3DO games, Retro Gamer summarized it as short, "light-hearted", and "blithe", but enjoyable and worthy of its praise. The North America version had a limited release so is now considered a rare collector's item.
