= NeuroDancer: Journey Into the Neuronet! =

1994 video game

- Developer(s): Electric Dreams Inc.
- Publisher(s): PIXIS Interactive
- Director(s): Paul Wu
- Designer(s): David Lo; Mark Alamares; Noel Saw
- Programmer(s): Jerry Thorpe
- Composer(s): X‑Calibur
- Platform(s): 3DO Interactive Multiplayer; Macintosh; Microsoft Windows
- Release: NA: 1994
- Genre(s): Action, adult, maze
- Mode(s): Single-player

NeuroDancer: Journey Into the Neuronet! is a 1994 adult action-maze video game developed by American studio Electric Dreams and published by PIXIS Interactive in North America for the 3DO Interactive Multiplayer, Macintosh and Windows.

== Gameplay ==
PC version screenshot.

NeuroDancer is primarily a maze game with action and adult elements that is played from a first-person perspective.

== Development and release ==
A port for the Atari Jaguar CD was in development and slated to be published by PIXIS Interactive around the second quarter of 1995, however, it was never released for unknown reasons.

== Reception ==
Reception

Review scores
Publication	Score
Digital Press	(3DO) 3 / 10
PC Player	(Windows) 23%

NeuroDancer: Journey Into the Neuronet! received negative reception from critics since its release.
