= Seal of the Pharaoh =

1994 video game

- Developer: System Sacom
- Publishers: JP: ASK Kodansha; NA: Panasonic
- Producers: Haruo Ogawa; Shuichi Koyama
- Composer: Haruo Hosoya
- Platform: 3DO Interactive Multiplayer
- Release: JP: June 25, 1994; NA: 1995
- Genres: Role-playing video game, dungeon crawler
- Mode: Single-player

Seal of the Pharaoh, known in Japan as Virtual Quest: Pharaoh no Fūin (Virtual Quest: ファラオの封印), is a first-person role-playing video game developed by ASK Kodansha / System Sacom and published by Panasonic for the 3DO Interactive Multiplayer.

== Gameplay ==
Gameplay screenshot

Seal of the Pharaoh is a first-person role-playing video game involving dungeon exploration.

== Reception ==
Reception

Review scores
Publication	Score
Electronic Gaming Monthly	19/40
GameFan	212/300
GamePro	16/20
Hyper	5%
Next Generation	2/5
Computer+Videogiochi	81/100
Electronic Entertainment	1/5
Ultimate Future Games	65%
VideoGame	22/30

Next Generation reviewed the game, rating it two stars out of five, and stated that "The instruction book helpfully supplies maps to the first four levels, but there's not a lot of variance to the scenery no matter how deep you delve, and its brightly lit corridors reveal a total lack of atmosphere or any distinctive style. It's competent, but no better." 3DO Magazine editor Stuart Wynne found the game tedious and summarized, "Patiently fighting your way through the endless mazes may not be too dreadful once, but when you die gathering enough enthusiasm to retry is far from easy. Save points are few and far between, making this idiosyncratic release very much one for the patient."
