= Cowboy Casino Interactive Poker =

1994 gambling video game

- Windows version cover
- Developer: IntelliPlay
- Publisher: Intellimedia Sports
- Platforms: 3DO Interactive Multiplayer, Macintosh, Windows
- Release: 1994
- Genres: Card game
- Mode: Single-player

Cowboy Casino Interactive Poker is a video game developed by IntelliPlay and published by Intellimedia Sports in 1994 for the 3DO Interactive Multiplayer, Macintosh, and Windows.

== Gameplay ==
Cowboy Casino Interactive Poker is a game designed to teach players the fundamentals of poker. Set in an Old West saloon, the player can challenge five computer-controlled opponents: a cowboy, a gambler, a dude, a bandito, and a miner. The player can choose between four rule sets including five-card draw, five-card stud, seven-card stud, and Texas hold 'em. The game comes with an educational booklet, The Basics of Winning Poker by J. Edward Allen, which details the ways poker is played in casinos.

== Development and release ==
Cowboy Casino was developed by IntelliPlay, a subsidiary of Atlanta-based Intellimedia Sports. Founded in 1991, the company was an exclusive licensee to ESPN titles for a time and focused on producing instructional and sports coaching games. In August 1994, Intellimedia announced a line of such products ahead of the autumn launch of the 3DO Interactive Multiplayer, a CD-ROM-based console which aimed to revolutionize the home gaming experience. The 3DO Company president Trip Hawkins spoke of the Intellimedia series as one that used "animation, sound and full-motion video to provide a captivating and constantly changing environment that players will want to experience again and again." Cowboy Casino was one for the few non-sports games in the line, opting to teach poker with real-life actors whose reactions differ depending on the player's choices. Intellimedia head Ben J. Dyer explained, "Responses are always unexpected, so each time a hand is played it results in a new and humorous adventure." The game was slated for release on the 3DO in April or May of 1994. Versions followed for Macintosh and Windows via Multimedia PC (MPC).

== Reception ==
Reception

Review scores
Publication	Score
NGamer	1/5
Entertainment Weekly	B−
Games Amusement Pleasure	70%
MAN!AC	13%
Super GamePower	2.8/5

Cowboy Casino received mixed reviews. Writing for CD-ROM Entertainment, Steve Greenlee complimented the game's ease of use and video clips, stating that it would be a good choice for those wanting to learn the basics of poker or as a gift for those without high expectations. The Spanish magazine Micromanía briefly mentioned it as a fun and entertaining way to become a card gambler. Entertainment Weekly graded the game a B−, praising its presentation but finding that "it can't escape the genre's main failing: You can never tell if the computer is dealing straight. This is fine if all you want to do is learn how to play the game, but experienced hands will find it unnerving to get four fifths of the way through a diamond flush, only to be busted by a 10 of clubs." Next Generation rated the game one star out of five. The magazine cited it as "painfully slow" and that its included coaching manual shows what to do to win but not why, concluding "you don't learn much, or even enjoy playing the hands." The game also was panned by Martin Gaksch of the German magazine MAN!AC, who scored it 13% and summarized it as "Flop of the Year" and "a first-class 'interactive' piece of junk" due to a dull presentation and lack of gameplay.
