= Real Pinball =

1994 video game

- North American cover art
- Developer: Japan Dataworks
- Publisher: Panasonic
- Platform: 3DO
- Release: JP: March 20, 1994; NA: 1994; EU: 1994
- Genre: Pinball
- Modes: Single-player, multiplayer

Real Pinball, known in Japan as Fire Ball!! (Note: Japanese: ファイアボール, Hepburn: Faiabōru), is a video game developed by Japan Dataworks and published by Panasonic for the 3DO Interactive Multiplayer.

== Gameplay ==
Real Pinball features five pinball machines to choose from, that become increasingly more complicated. Allows for multiball play.

== Development and release ==
Real Pinball was developed by Japan Dataworks and originally released by Panasonic in Japan as Fire Ball!! on March 20, 1994. A Japan-exclusive sequel by the same developer and publisher titled Battle Pinball was released for the 3DO on November 25, 1994.

== Reception ==
Reception

Review scores
Publication	Score
Famitsu	18/40
Next Generation	1/5
3DO Magazine	1/5
Ação Games	13/30
Génération 4	10%
MAN!AC	26%
Super GamePower	2.3/5
Video Games (DE)	20%
VideoGames	1/10

Real Pinball received very negative reviews. Next Generation reviewed the game, rating it one star out of five, and stated that "3DO owners will have to wait a little bit longer for a 'real' pinball game to appear."
