= Chess Wars =

1996 video game

Chess Wars: A Medieval Fantasy
- Developers: Art Data Interactive, Digital Arena Software
- Publisher: WizardWorks
- Producer: Carl Hartman
- Programmer: Alex Wells
- Platform: MS-DOS
- Release: 9 December 1996
- Genre: Chess
- Modes: Single player, Multiplayer

Chess Wars: A Medieval Fantasy is a computer chess game released for MS-DOS in 1996 by WizardWorks It shows full-motion video sequences when pieces are captured. Chess Wars was developed by Art Data Interactive, with additional work by Digital Arena Software, and was the final game from Art Data Interactive; the cost of producing the full-motion video was a factor in the company's closure.

Chess Wars was announced in 1995, originally intended for release on 3DO in November 1995, but the 3DO version never shipped.

== Gameplay ==
Chess Wars is a 3D computer chess game that animates the movement of the pieces in a manner similar to Battle Chess. The game displays full-motion video sequences when a piece is taken. Pieces on the board correspond to 'character pieces' representing actors for each piece on the chess board. The full-motion video sequences follow a loose story of two opposing kingdoms meeting on the battlefield.

The chess engine of Chess Wars contains strength settings, an enhanced move history, and a 'guess move' mode. It has a reported chess rating score of 2100 for 'Master' difficulty and 1000 for 'Beginner' difficulty on a standard computer. The game includes data from 60,000 masters' games and 4,000 opening variations as a reference for players.

== Development ==
Full-motion video sequences were written and directed by screenwriter Paul W. Cooper in his first and only directorial role. Filming was supported with a cast of eighteen, plus six stuntmen, three camera units and over a hundred extras. Overall, the game features 60 minutes of full-motion video footage.

Art Data Interactive reportedly commissioned the footage before development of the software, which led to considerable delays. Alex Wells of Digital Arena Software was contracted to complete the programming.

== Reception ==
Reception

Review scores
Publication	Score
Computer Games Strategy Plus	2.5/5
PC PowerPlay	70%

Reviews for Chess Wars were mixed. Chuck Klimushyn of Computer Games Strategy Plus stated "as a chess program, the game is adequate, but just barely", although found the full-motion video sequences "entertaining" and "varied enough to keep me from toggling them off. David Wildgoose of PC PowerPlay critiqued the sequences as "hideously embarrassing", recommending that players "disable the appalling FMV sequences", although praising the tutorial, graphics, and difficulty levels.

== Legacy ==
The complex and costly production of Chess Wars was a contributing factor in the closure of Art Data Interactive in 1996-97. 3DO Magazine reported that Art Data Interactive "burnt up around half a million dollars" in producing the full-motion video sequences.
