= Shredfest =

- Developer: Electronic Arts
- Publisher: Electronic Arts
- Director: Mike Lopez
- Artist: Margaret Foley
- Composer: Various artists
- Platforms: Sega Saturn, PlayStation 1, 3DO Interactive Multiplayer
- Release: Unreleased
- Genre: Sports video game
- Mode: Single-player

Shredfest is a cancelled video game by Electronic Arts. Development started under the name Face Plant for the Sega Genesis before shifting development to the Sega Saturn, 3DO Interactive Multiplayer, and PlayStation 1. After going through a series of missed release dates across 1996 and 1997, the game was quietly cancelled.

== Gameplay ==
The game's premise entailed taking the gameplay of Electronic Arts's Road Rash video games, and applying it to snowboarding. In it, the player maneuvers a snowboarder down a 3D hill. Similar to Road Rash, the gameplay required the player to balance aspects of racing and fighting others, while also throwing performing tricks into the mix. Gameplay featured realistic physics, and would require the player to factor in gravity, speed, turn rates, and the shifting of body weight into performing tricks. As in real snowboarding, points for tricks are rewarded on many factors, including speed, height, style, and complexity of the trick.

Gameplay followed a similar structure to some of the Road Rash entries as well; the player starts as a novice snowboarder participating in local snowboarding competitions, restricted to their home area until they win enough prize money to travel to other regions. The game was to contain 5 courses and 8 resorts. Multiple gameplay modes were planned, including downhill racing, slalom, and trick-focused mode, as was a "free mode" where players could simply freely snowboard and explore levels without purpose.

== Development ==
The game started its development as a game called Face Plant for the Sega Genesis. Development began in 1993, with a planned release date of March 1994. Development was headed by producers Randy Breen and Steve Murray, previously of Road Rash 2. By mid-1995, the Genesis version had been cancelled, but development was shifted to bring the game to the 3DO Interactive Multiplayer, Sega Saturn, and PlayStation 1 instead under the name Shredfest. The core development team at Electronic Arts consisted of roughly 17 employees, including Margaret Foley as art director, Mike Lopez as course designer, Matt Sarconi as lead animator, and Lisa Ching and Thom Phillabaum as software engineers. Emphasis was placed on creating a sense of realism in the game, with the team taking trips to real life snowboard hills to take notes and observe. Five real-life snowboard manufacturing brands were used - Burton, Morrow, Nitro, Palmer, and Sims. Michael Chantry, a supervisory judge from the International Snowboarding Federation was brought on as a consultant, from as early on as the Face Plant timeframe. Motion-capture was used to create realistic snowboarding physics. An alternative rock soundtrack featuring music from real bands was also planned.

The 3DO version was debuted at E3 1995, while the Saturn and PlayStation versions were debuted a year later at E3 1996, with the 3DO version not present. Development for the Saturn was reportedly prioritized, with plans on releasing it on Saturn first, and the other platforms afterwards, although from 1996 onward, 3DO was generally not listed as a platform. The game went through a series of release dates prior to its quiet cancellation. In the June 1996 issues of GamePro it was reported that the game was only 10% complete, but was still scheduled for a September 1996 release. The release date later shifted to October 1996. By January 1997, it was listed as a March 1997 release.
