= Mazer (video game) =

1995 video game

- Developer: American Laser Games
- Publisher: American Laser Games
- Programmers: Nathanael Brown; Tommie Daniel
- Artists: Darren Thorne; Jeff Baker; Larry Shultz
- Composer: Gino Rascon
- Platforms: Arcade, 3DO
- Release: Arcade: NA: 1995; 3DO: NA: July 31, 1995
- Genre: Run and gun
- Modes: Single-player, multiplayer

Mazer is a video game developed and published by American Laser Games in arcades as well as the 3DO.

== Gameplay ==
Mazer is an isometric shooter with a three-quarter perspective. Players are given the option of playing as one of four characters, Arashi, Azotar, Freon, or Hawk who must defend earth against the conquering alien species of Semag-Resal from the Nacierma system.

== Development and release ==
Gameplay screenshot.

Mazer was developed by a small team from American Laser Games, ld by programmer Nathanael Brown with several staff members also providing the characters' likeness. It was released for 3DO on 31st July, 1995. A planned arcade version was never released.

== Reception ==
Reception

Review scores
Publication	Score
GamePro	(3DO) 13 / 20
Next Generation	(3DO) 1/5
3DO Magazine	(3DO) 1/5
Coming Soon Magazine	(3DO) 2.5/5
The Electric Playground	(3DO) 7 / 10
Electronic Entertainment	1.5 / 5
Joystick	(3DO) 40%
Super Game Power	(3DO) 2.5/5.0

Next Generation reviewed the 3DO version of the game, rating it one star out of five, and stated that "this title gives you the most frustrating gaming experience you can remember [...] The CD might be suitable for use as a coaster, but that's about it."
