= System Sacom =

Japanese electronics company

System Sacom Sales Corp.
- Native name

Japanese name
- Kanji: システムサコム
- Headquarters: Tokyo, Japan

System Sacom (システムサコム), also known as System Sacom Sales Corp., is a Japanese company which sells electronic devices. They are more notable for their past, in which they developed video games. In the 1980s, they mainly published games for computers, but they changed focus to home consoles in the 1990s. Its head office is located in Tokyo.

Sacom had particular success with their Novel Ware (ノベルウェア) series, which had tremendous effect within the sound novel and visual novel genres. In the series, they tried to create a fusion of sound and the written word.

When the Famicom Disk System was popular, Sacom was a member of DOG (Disk Original Group), of which Square was a prominent member.

System Sacom withdrew from the video game business in 1998. Currently, all System Sacom IPs are owned by D4 Enterprise.

== Games list ==
=== For computer ===
- DOME (PC-8801 / PC-9801 / X1 / FM-7 / MSX2 / MZ-2500 / X68000)
- Shati (PC-8801)
- Soft de Hard na Monogatari (PC-9801 / X68000)
- Soft de Hard na Monogatari 2 (PC-9801 / X68000)
- 38 man Kiro no Kokū (PC-9801 / X68000 / FM-TOWNS)
- Yami no Ketsuzoku (X68000)
- Yami no Ketsuzoku -Kanketsuhen- (X68000)
- Yami no Ketsuzoku Special (FM-TOWNS)
- Providence (PC-8801)
- Märchen Veil (PC-9801 / PC-8801 / PC-8801mk II SR / X1 / FM-7 / MZ-2500 / MSX2)
- Märchen Veil 2 (PC-9801)
- Metal Sight (X68000)
- Euphory (X1)
- Valna (PC-8801)
- Yūreikun (MSX2)
- Valiant (PC-9801)
- Moon Ball (PC-9801)
- Brown Zuran
- Zone (PC-9801)
- Highway Star (PC-9801)
- EVOLUTION (FM-TOWNS)
- Tokimeki Memorial: Forever With You (WINDOWS 95)
- Tokimeki Memorial Taisen: Puzzle Dama (WINDOWS 95)
- Gradius Deluxe Pack (WINDOWS 95)
- Henry Explorers (WINDOWS 95)
- Gensō Suikoden (WINDOWS 95)
- Vandal Hearts (WINDOWS 95)

=== For console ===
- Märchen Veil (FDS)
- Fire Rock (FDS)
- Grandslam Tennis Tournament '92 (MD)
- Mansion of HIdden Souls (MCD)
- Gekitotsu Dangan Jidōsha Kessen: Battle Mobile (SFC)
- Smart Ball (SFC)
- The Mansion of Hidden Souls (SS)
- Seal of the Pharaoh (SS)
- Lunacy (SS)
- Jikū Tantei DD: Maboroshi no Rōrerai (SS / PS)
- Jikū Tantei DD2 (PS)
- Murder on the Eurasia Express (PS)
- Are! Mo Kore? Mo Momotarō (PS)
- Great Hits (PS)
- Gale Racer (SS)
- Astronōka (PS)
- Iblard -Laputa no Kaeru Machi- (PS)
- Running High (PS)
- Cyber Daisenryaku (PS)
- Deep Fear (SS)
