= Cyberdillo =

1996 video game

- 3DO cover art
- Developer: Pixel Technologies
- Publisher: Panasonic
- Platforms: 3DO, MS-DOS
- Release: 1996
- Genre: First-person shooter
- Mode: Single-player

Cyberdillo is a first-person shooter developed by Pixel Technologies and published by Panasonic in 1996. It was released for the 3DO and MS-DOS. The game received mixed reviews.

== Gameplay ==
Cyberdillo is a first-person shooter in which the player takes the role of the Cyberdillo, an armadillo who was run over by a car and was made into a cyborg. Starting off with a plunger gun, Cyberdillo must collect items such as platform shoes or bellbottoms to progress to the next level.

Enemies the player come across include hairspray and bipedal hotdogs. The player can also collect power-ups like the skin flute, which temporarily causes the screen to go black (a play on the myth about masturbation), and the laxative which will kill you if you're unable to find a toilet in time.

== Development ==
Cyberdillo was developed by Pixel Technologies and published by Panasonic in January 1996.

== Reception ==
Reception

Review scores
Publication	Score
GamePro	3/5
Next Generation	2/5
Computer Games Magazine	1.5/5

Cyberdillo received mixed reviews from video game critics.

A reviewer for GamePro called the gameplay "redundant" and lacking Doom's suspense. The reviewer was also mixed on the game's music. While calling it "tongue-in-cheek" and adding charm to the game, they added that the player's tolerance would depend on their liking of disco. They also described the voice acting as "unintelligible".

Steve Bauman from Computer Games Magazine considered the soundtrack to be the best part of the game, while calling the game mediocre.

Hardcore Gaming 101 criticized the controls for being too slippery and its level designs for being confusing.

Next Generation reviewed the 3DO version of the game, and stated that "Although Cyberdillo moves surprisingly fast on 3DO, the control is very loose and the graphics are far from cutting edge. The developers deserve credit for trying to make something that's different, but in the end, Cyberdillo is either a cute novelty or a run-of-the-mill Doom game – neither of which make for much long-term entertainment."

Starting July 15th, 2026 video game website Giant Bomb played through all of Cyberdillo for a feature named Blight Club. Blight Club is a Giant Bomb series where different editors at the website play poorly made video games while two others comment on the gameplay and generally what's going on in their life/on the website. Cyberdillo came at the end of a trio of games. The three games that were played were considered "rip cord" games where if someone did something particularly egregious the next person would be "blighted" by a particularly bad game. Cyberdillo was considered so bad that they decided to go back to video games that were the "normal" level of bad for the series. The next game in the series was Duke Nukem Forever.
