= Mansion of Hidden Souls (Sega CD video game) =

1993 video game

- Sega CD box art
- Developer: System Sacom
- Publishers: Sega (JP/PAL); Vic Tokai (NA)
- Platform: Sega CD
- Release: JP: December 10, 1993; NA: February 1994; PAL: March 1994
- Genre: Adventure
- Mode: Single-player

Mansion of Hidden Souls (Note: Japanese: 夢見館の物語, Hepburn: Yumemi Yakata no Monogatari) (titled Yumemi Mystery Mansion in Europe) is an adventure video game released for the Sega CD, developed by System Sacom and published by Sega in Japan and PAL regions and by Vic Tokai in North America. It was first released on December 10, 1993, in Japan and then in February 1994 in North America. The PAL version followed soon a month after North America.

A sequel was released in 1994 for the Sega Saturn titled The Mansion of Hidden Souls.

== Plot ==
One night, siblings Jonathan and Samantha come across a butterfly while exploring a grassy field. Enchanted by the butterfly's haunting beauty, Samantha chases after it. Johnathan follows reluctantly, repeating their grandmother's warnings about ghosts who roam the area and turn people into butterflies. The butterfly leads Samantha into a mansion, where she becomes trapped. As Johnathan, the player must explore the mansion, overcome several puzzles, and escape with his sister before the pair of them become permanent residents.

While exploring the mansion, the player encounters several ghosts, who appear in the form of butterflies:

- A pampered young girl. She seems friendly at first, but is actually a conniving brat.
- An Australian butterfly collector. He seems anxious for the boy to become a butterfly and join the collection.
- A painter, who is in a perpetually dreamy, absent-minded state.
- An Eastern European tavern wench. She cackles menacingly and seems amused by the children's predicament.
- A piano-playing southern belle, who longs to touch the keys again.

== Gameplay ==
In Mansion of Hidden Souls, the player travels between areas via 3D pre-rendered first-person full-motion video sequences, pressing the action button whenever they find something of interest. Doing so, sometimes reveals an important item, such as a key or matchbox, which is added to their inventory. The number of actual puzzles is fairly small; the player spends most of the game exploring the mansion and searching for important items.

== Release and reception ==
Reception

Review scores
Publication	Score
Electronic Gaming Monthly	9/10, 8/10, 6/10, 7/10, 8/10
Famitsu	8/10, 7/10, 8/10, 9/10
Beep! MegaDrive	8/10, 8/10, 8/10, 8/10

Mansion of Hidden Souls was released in Japan on December 10, 1993 for the Sega CD. In Japan, the game was released as the second part of Sega's "Virtual Cinema" series, with the first game being Night Trap (1992).

From contemporary reviews, an Electronic Gaming Monthly reviewer described it as "An interesting first-person perspective game with fluid graphics and great sound effects." GamePro described it as a solid The 7th Guest clone, especially praising the use of sound effects to enhance the horror.

In Beep! MegaDrive one of the four reviewers commented that there are no mysteries or twists to solve, but Mansion of Hidden Souls can be enjoyed on its straight-forward narrative on its own. Another reviewer said while they found it unsatisfying that it could be completed within two hours, they said they were satisfied by the overall quality.

== See also ==
- List of Sega CD games
