= Art Data Interactive =

Former American video game developer and publisher

- Type: Public
- Industry: Video games
- Founded: 1993; 33 years ago
- Founders: Randy Scott
- Defunct: September 1999
- Headquarters: Simi Valley, California, U.S.
- Products: Doom (3DO)

Art Data Interactive was an American video game developer and publisher founded in 1993, associated with its 3DO port of Doom, which was met with negative reception. The company became inactive by 1997, and defunct as a business in 1999.

== History ==
=== Initial ventures (1993–94) ===
Art Data Interactive was founded by CEO Randy Scott in 1993, and incorporated on 14 November 1994. Scott had acted as Vice President of Sales at ABC International, a distributor of video games, and raised capital for his own development company. According to Rebecca Heineman, Scott raised most of his initial funding of $100,000 from friends and members of his local church. The headquarters of the company were established in Simi Valley.

Art Data Interactive's first venture was to assist in funding for the production of the 1994 game Rise of the Robots, earning distribution and promotional rights to the 1995 port of the game for the 3DO console. Because Art Data Interactive secured distribution rights for copies for an existing game, sold through their channels, they were not credited as the publisher for the game. In 1995, Art Data Interactive published Nick Faldo's Championship Golf Challenge for MS-DOS. Similar to Rise of the Robots, the game was a redistributed version of an existing 1992 golfing video game Nick Faldo's Championship Golf, previously released for Amiga, Amiga CD32, Commodore 64, and MS-DOS by Grandslam Entertainment. The game was advertised as featuring "eight computer opponents, several 18-hole courses and a comprehensive coach section featuring Nick Faldo himself".

=== 3DO port of Doom (1995) ===
==== Acquisition and licensing ====
In January 1995, Art Data Interactive acquired the licensing rights from id Software to release conversions of Doom and Doom II: Hell on Earth for the 3DO console at a value of $250,000, with an agreement to release the port by Christmas 1995. Scott claimed he was able to secure the rights for Doom by leveraging relationships with business general manager Nick Earl of The 3DO Company and manager Jay Wilbur of id Software.

==== Marketing ====
Prior to and during development of Doom, Art Data Interactive made several statements to gaming publications that the 3DO port would contain additional features to its counterparts on other platforms. The port was slated to feature "a never-before seen fourth episode with nine all-new levels, new monsters (and) weapons". The game would also feature "an extensive-all new full-motion video sequences" filmed in "24-bit Cinepak film". Graphics would be enhanced with "full, hi-res, full colour sprites". Art Data Interactive appeared at the Consumer Electronics Show in January 1995 to promote the release of Doom, reportedly displaying full-motion video footage shot for the game.

==== Development ====
Photograph of production of full-motion video for Doom in Art Data Interactive offices

Screenshot of gameplay from the 3DO port of Doom

Production of the port of Doom was troubled. The game was developed in ten weeks by software engineer Rebecca Heineman of Logicware as a port from the Atari Jaguar code. False expectations by Art Data Interactive on the ease of porting a game to the 3DO led to significant constraints on the development timeframe, with most work by Heineman being dedicated to completely rewriting the rendering engine to be compatible with the hardware of the 3DO. Due to this, few to no additional features advertised by Art Data Interactive made it into the final release.

In 1995, Art Data Interactive shot full-motion video sequences intended as cutscenes for Doom before development on the port had started. Footage was shot in Art Data Interactive offices, with production assisted by props and effects artist Chris Gilman on behalf of Global Effects. By April 1995, Scott had backed down from the inclusion of full-motion video in the 3DO release of Doom and would be used for a separate port for Doom II, claiming the footage was "so bloody and so gory that we couldn't use it" and that "it was a little too real, very graphic." However, according to Gilman, the footage was ultimately unusable due to the incorrect use of the greenscreen. Heineman stated "[Scott] actually thought that green screen cut scenes could just be dropped in...and it would magically composite...I told him I could not use any footage, and ignored him and shipped what I had".

Despite Art Data Interactive undertaking marketing for Doom, no substantial work had been done to port the game. By July 1995, The 3DO Company had made serious inquiries as to the status of Doom pending arrangements to secure a due date for a production run, anticipating the promised Christmas 1995 release. According to Heineman, Art Data Interactive had by that time approached two developers, one of whom provided a rejected offer for $3 million (~$5.62 million in 2024) in two years, and another that had pulled out of a contract to port the game after Art Data Interactive had failed to provide the company with milestone payments.

Art Data Interactive approached Rebecca Heineman of Logicware to complete the port in June 1995. Heineman was an experienced developer who by 1995 had been a founding member of Interplay Entertainment and contributed to the development of games in The Bard's Tale series and completed ports for Wolfenstein 3D and Another World. During negotiations, Art Data Interactive represented to Heineman that the game was "90 per cent complete" and the work involved would require her to "finish up some bugs and get the game ready for shipping", and accepted the contract on that basis.

Having committed to the project by August 1995, Heineman was told by project manager Tristan Anderson that no progress had been made on porting the game. Expecting the source code of the game, Art Data Interactive provided Heineman with a commercial copy of Doom and a floppy desk full of asset images to add to the game, with Scott believing a simple recompile was all that was needed, and simply adding assets into the game would render them fully functional without any coding. Heineman was required to request the source code from id Software and received the source code from the Atari Jaguar version of the game. Heineman estimates the entire development for Doom was completed in ten weeks between August 1995 and release of the master copy for quality assurance testing by The 3DO Company by November.

Development of the port had numerous difficulties with performance. Heineman stated that she did not have the time to optimise the code of the game in the timeframes available. Because of a rendering bug encountered with the 3DO's CEL engine, Heineman had to set up rendering flat surfaces in software, and proceeded to write a code library in a more efficient language ultimately used by The 3DO Company when revising their compiler tools. Upon seeing the result, id Software demanded that the window size of the game be scaled down to a third of the screen to address the poor framerate. Further changes were made to the level maps to alter or remove elements, such as objects and items, to entire rooms, to improve the rendering load on the game.

Porting the custom-made MIDI driver from the Jaguar to the 3DO was a further challenge. Because Heineman had insufficient time to write a new audio driver for the game's music, she sent recordings of the tracks from the Jaguar version's soundtrack to Scott, who had prior experience as a musician and producer. Scott's band re-recorded the tracks live. Heineman recalls "He recorded a song every two or three days, and as soon as he gave me a song I just dropped it into the game."

==== Release ====
Doom was released on 29 December 1995. The game was a commercial failure for Art Data Interactive. The company had ordered 50,000 copies of Doom to be produced at a price of $150,000 in licensing and manufacturing fees from The 3DO Company. With an estimated base of 250,000 3DO units in the United States, and successful releases selling between 10,000 and 20,000 copies, the release was an overestimate of the anticipated success of the game, with Heineman estimating the game sold 10,000 copies.

==== Reception ====
Reception of the 3DO port of Doom was negative. Reviewers focused upon the poor performance and low resolution which made it an inferior port of the game compared to other platforms. 3DO Magazine, who had spent previous issues generating enthusiasm for Doom, conceded that the port was a "disappointment" and an "embarrassing distance from the talk", citing the slow performance of the game, with particular criticism of the removal of features promised to the magazine for inclusion in the game, such as the lack of additional levels or graphical enhancements.

Maximum gave the game a one-star review, dismissing it as a "disappointing translation" and a "dismal failure" of a conversion, with specific criticism for the "unacceptable" performance issues and arguing the game was "indicative of the downward trend in the quality of 3DO software. Ed Lomas for Computer and Video Games stated "the 3DO version doesn't impress", citing the "jerky graphics and slow movement (which) ruin it totally". Comparing the game to the PlayStation port of Doom, Lomas observed the game lacked "different lighting effects and translucent walls" and a "very small playing window".

=== Chess Wars (1996) ===
Chess Wars is a computer chess game released for MS-DOS by WizardWorks and developed by Art Data Interactive and Digital Arena Software. The game was announced by Art Data Interactive in 1995, originally intended for release on the 3DO in November 1995.

==== Development ====
Screenshot of gameplay from Chess Wars

Work on Chess Wars began with filming of full-motion video sequences well before the front-end of the game had been developed. Art Data Interactive hired an extensive crew for the sequences, contracting screenwriter Paul Cooper in his first and only directorial role to write and direct scenes. Filming was supported with a cast of eighteen, plus six stuntmen, three camera units and over a hundred extras. Filming was shot at the former site of the Corriganville Movie Ranch. By February 1995 it was reported that Art Data Interactive had shot "no less than 27 different prologues and 134 battle sequences" during filming at a cost of around $500,000 (~$937,397 in 2024). Overall, the game features 60 minutes of full-motion video footage.

Despite the considerable footage developed for the game, Art Data Interactive was unable to independently develop the front end of the game. To complete the game Alex Wells of Digital Arena Software was contracted to complete the code and programming for the MS-DOS version. Releases of Chess Wars were planned for Windows and Mac, although these never eventuated. Art Data Interactive also made representations that the cut footage for Chess Wars would be released as a standalone DVD, although this never occurred.

==== Reception ====
Reviews for Chess Wars were mixed. Chuck Klimushyn of Computer Games Strategy Plus stated "as a chess program, the game is adequate, but just barely", although found the full-motion video sequences "entertaining" and "varied enough to keep me from toggling them off. David Wildgoose of PC PowerPlay critiqued the sequences as "hideously embarrassing", recommending that players "disable the appalling FMV sequences", although praising the tutorial, graphics, and difficulty levels.

=== Dissolution (1999) ===
Following the costly commercial failures of Doom and Chess Wars, Art Data Interactive ceased operations in late 1996. The company was suspended by the California Franchise Tax Board on 1 September 1999.

== Unreleased projects ==
=== Doom II (3DO) ===
A 3DO port of Doom II was announced for release in 1995 alongside the release of Doom. Jay Wilbur of id Software represented that the studio had agreed to greenlight the sequel if the original 3DO port performed well. Following the unsuccessful release of the port of Doom in December 1995, Art Data Interactive continued to suggest that a combined release may be released for the Panasonic M2.

=== Rise of the Robots (Jaguar CD) ===
Following the release of the 3DO port of Rise of the Robots, Art Data Interactive planned to release a Jaguar CD port of the game to be distributed by Time Warner Interactive with a release date of August 1995.

=== Alien Seed and Bounty Hunter (3DO) ===
In an April 1995 interview with the editor of 3DO Magazine, Randy Scott announced Art Data Interactive was undertaking work on several projects: Alien Seed and Bounty Hunter. Alien Seed was advertised as a game with "real time-rendering" and a "revolutionary new polygon intensive extravaganza" planned for the Panasonic M2, although never previewed or released. No information survives on the development of Bounty Hunter.

== Games published ==
Year	Title	Platform(s)	Notes
9 December 1996	Chess Wars: A Medieval Fantasy	MS-DOS	Developer, published by WizardWorks
29 December 1995	Doom	3DO	Publisher, developed by id Software
1995	Rise of the Robots	3DO	Publisher, developed by Mirage Technologies
1995	Nick Faldo's Championship Golf	MS-DOS	Publisher, developed by Grandslam Interactive
