= The Mansion of Hidden Souls (Sega Saturn video game) =

1994 video game

- Developer: System Sacom
- Publisher: Sega
- Director: Tomohiro Kondo
- Producers: Yoji Ishii; Yutaka Sugano
- Platform: Sega Saturn
- Release: JP: December 2, 1994; UK: November 1995
- Genre: Adventure

The Mansion of Hidden Souls (Note: Japanese: 真説・夢見館 扉の奥に誰かが・・・, Hepburn: Shinsetsu yumemikan tobira no oku ni dareka ga; lit. 'Real Dream Mansion: Someone Behind the Door..) is a 1994 adventure video game developed by System Sacom and published by Sega for the Sega Saturn. The game involves players talking to collectors and collecting objects to solve a mystery involving the mansion and its inhabitants. The Mansion of Hidden Souls is the follow-up to Mansion of Hidden Souls (1993) for the Sega CD.

Reviews in Sega Saturn Magazine, GamePro and Hyper complimented The Mansion of Hidden Souls's graphics while some reviews disliked the narrative themes or found the voice acting to be unintentionally funny. GameFan awarded Mansion of Hidden Souls as the best "Graphic Adventure/FMV" game for the Sega Saturn at their year-end awards.

== Plot and gameplay ==
The aim of The Mansion of Hidden Souls is to investigate the cause of the red full moon, which seems to be affecting the inhabitants of the mansion. By talking to characters and collecting objects in each room in the mansion, the player discovers clues to solve the mystery.

The Mansion of Hidden Souls has the player complete their tasks against an in-game timer.

== Release and reception ==
Reception

Review scores
Publication	Score
Famitsu	7/10, 7/10, 8/10, 8/10
Hyper	70/100
Next Generation	3/5
Maximum	2/5
Sega Saturn Magazine	69%

The Mansion of Hidden Souls was released in Japan for the Sega Saturn on December 2, 1994. It was released in November 1995 in the United Kingdom. According to Sega Saturn Magazine, the Japanese release of the Saturn game "received a rather lukewarm reception".

Reviews in Sega Saturn Magazine, GamePro and Hyper found the graphics to be considerably improved from the Sega CD game, Mansion of Hidden Souls (1993)

The GamePro remarked that the disembodied talking heads of the Saturn game "will make you chuckle instead of cower" and that the music is not as effective. Sega Saturn Magazine said that "the choice of voices for each person is hilarious.", particularly the gunman. Dave Quan of The Oakland Tribune found the plot of the game confusing and disliked the music and audio. They said "what passes for a music track is really a four second music loop played four seconds too long."

Reviewers in Hyper and Sega Saturn Magazine found the story would not appeal to all players. The latter publication said the story was outdated, stating "what we want from this type of game is a cyberpunk style thriller - not a Jackanory after a couple of bad pints." The reviewer in Hyper echoed this, writing that "those who cannot stomach anything remotely twee in nature would find it all a bit childish."

A review in Next Generation said that moving through the game was slow-paced, while it was "intriguing and engaging - it's just not a good game for newbies to the genre." Maximum called it "a great-looking game, let down by the linear nature of the adventure". Sega Saturn Magazine wrote that it was "fairly entertaining." and "its just not in-depth enough to last very long."

GameFan awarded Mansion of Hidden Souls as the best "Graphic Adventure/FMV" game for the Sega Saturn at their 1995 Megawards.

== See also ==
- List of Sega Saturn games
