= Guardian War =

1994 video game

- Developer: Microcabin
- Publisher: Matsushita Electric Corporation of America
- Designers: Masashi Kato; Kenzo Furuya; Shinji Ishikawa
- Composers: Yasufumi Fukuda; Yukiharu Urita
- Platform: 3DO
- Release: NA: November 1994; JP: 11 June 1994; EU: 1994
- Genre: Tactical role-playing game
- Mode: Single player

Guardian War is a 1994 console RPG or tactical role-playing game released on the 3DO platform. It is notable for its use of 3-D animation which was uncommon for console RPGs at the time. It is also known as Powers Kingdom (パワーズキングダム, Pawazu Kingudamu) in Japan and Europe, and is one of the few 3DO games which is region-protected. This only applies to the PAL game and console. Both NTSC versions can play on both US and JP consoles.

== Gameplay ==

Top: A golem exploring the map.
Bottom: A battle taking place.

The player moves a party around a world map consisting of distinct nodes. Most nodes are hostile territory (called fields in the game), very much like in Final Fantasy Tactics. When the party enters hostile territory, the party moves around as a single character in an over-the-shoulder perspective until they come in range of an enemy. The party then moves into a battle formation that the player designs beforehand. Unlike most console RPGs, the game does not cut to a separate screen or location for battles. Attacks have various ranges and area of effects. Turns are defined on a unit-by-unit basis, similarly to Shining Force: The Legacy of Great Intention. To advance past a hostile territory, the player must defeat all the enemies in that territory. Some side territories (called fields in the game) cannot be cleared and can be used to continue leveling characters. The player may also leave a territory any time that the party is not engaging an enemy, in which case all enemies will have respawned when the party returns to that territory.

Each shrine node houses an additional golem, which will immediately awaken and join the party if they enter the shrine. There are also shop nodes where the player can sell and buy items and equipment.

Additional golem bodies (character classes) can be applied to each character. Each character can carry up to three bodies. The primary slot determines the character's appearance, stats, equipable items, and ability to navigate specific terrains, and class experience gained from killing monsters is applied only to the body in that character's primary slot. However, the character may use the skills of secondary and tertiary bodies as long as that character has sufficient magic points. Accumulated class experience allows the character to eventually promote that body to a more powerful class. Certain skills can only be used when two characters with compatible skills combine them.

Some items allow the party to try to persuade an enemy to join the party. If they are successful, the enemy joins the party and will gain experience points when killing monsters, but remains under AI control. The game finishes when all members of the active party have been killed, or when the player has conquered all hostile territories.

== Synopsis ==
The player controls a golem who was awakened by the Goddess Erald which is fighting against Azrael, the Evil Lord.

== Reception ==
Reception

Review scores
Publication	Score
AllGame	3.5/5
Electronic Gaming Monthly	7.75/10
GameFan	286/300
GamePro	17.5/20
Next Generation	3/5
3DO Magazine	3/5
Génération 4	82%
Joystick	60%
Video Games	72%
VideoGames	8/10

Awards
Publication	Award
GameFan (1994)	Best Strategy; Best Special Effects (3DO)
EGM (1995)	The EGM Hot 50

Guardian War received two awards in GameFan's 1994 "Megawards", including Best Strategy Game and Best Special Effects on the 3DO.

GamePro's Leonardo da Video declared Guardian War "one of the most original, enjoyable, and addictive RPG/strategy games to come along in a while". He remarked that the system of party members changing bodies and carrying along sub-bodies is highly unique yet easy to adjust to due to the "simple and virtually self-explanatory" interface, and highly praised the graphics, especially the spell casting effects.

Electronic Gaming Monthly scored it 7.75 out of 10, and ranked it as one of their 50 highest-rated games of 1994.

Game Bytes gave the game a positive review in 1994.

Next Generation gave three stars out of five to the game.
