= OutRunners =

1993 video game

- North American Genesis box art
- Developer: Sega AM1
- Publisher: Sega (Note: The Sega Genesis version was published by Data East in North America.)
- Composers: Takayuki Nakamura; Takenobu Mitsuyoshi; Hiroshi Kawaguchi
- Series: OutRun
- Platforms: Arcade, Sega Genesis/Mega Drive
- Release: Arcade: JP: May 1993; WW: June 1993; Genesis/Mega Drive: JP: May 13, 1994; NA: July 1994
- Genre: Racing
- Modes: Single-player, multiplayer
- Arcade system: Sega System 32 Multi

OutRunners (アウトランナーズ, Autorannāzu) is a 1993 racing video game developed by Sega AM1 and published by Sega for arcades. It is the third game in the arcade OutRun series after Turbo OutRun (1989), and was ported to the Sega Genesis in 1994.

== Description ==
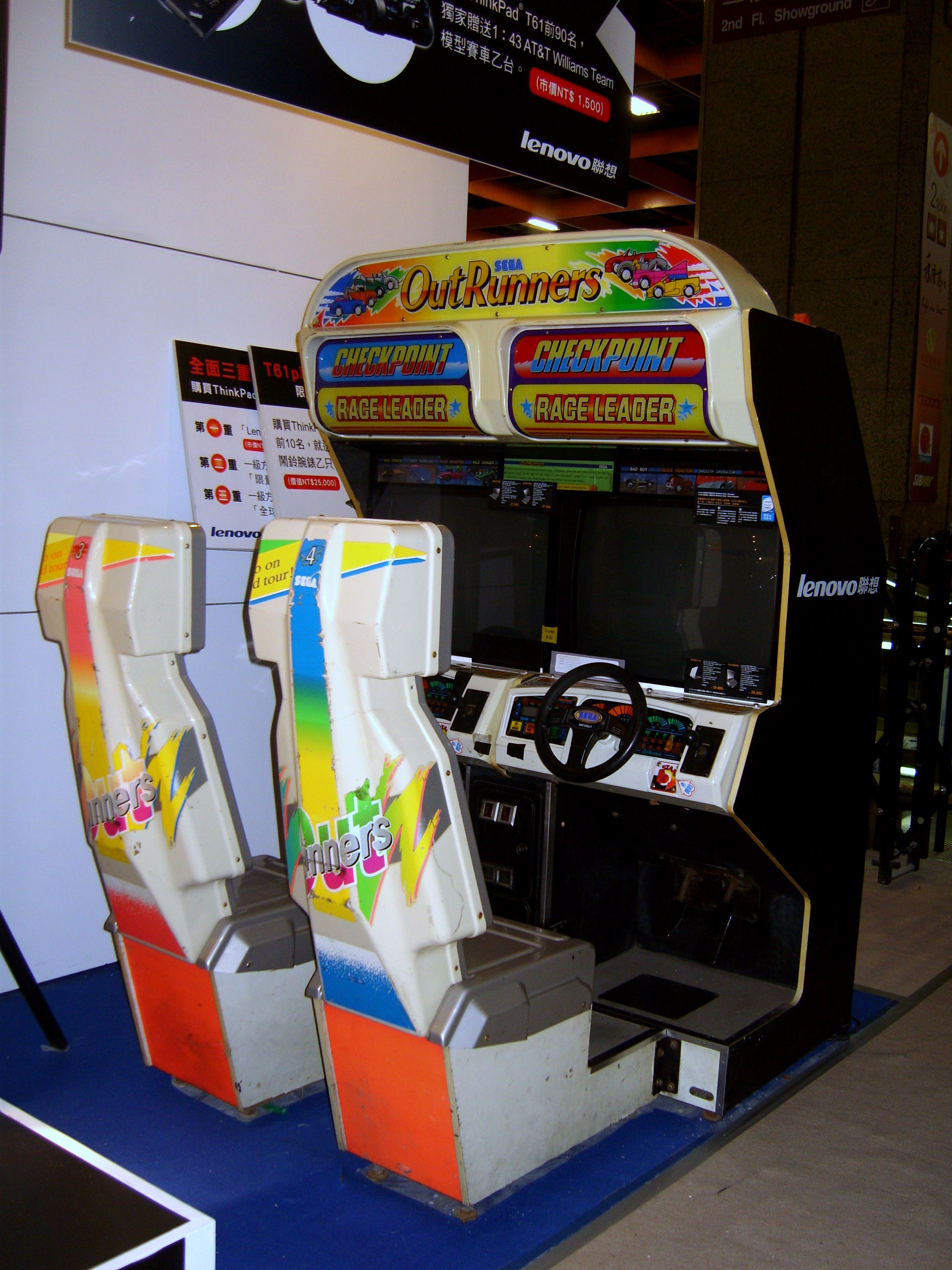
OutRunners two-player cabinet

OutRunners is the fourth game in the Out Run series, following Battle Out Run and Turbo OutRun. After Turbo OutRun's departure from Out Run's laid-back, charming atmosphere, fans wanted a game that captured the spirit of the original. OutRunners succeeded in doing this; it brought back the ability to take different paths through forks in the road, returned to a lighthearted atmosphere, and distanced itself well from the "serious" Turbo OutRun. The game featured head-to-head support, and with enough cabinets, up to eight players could challenge each other. It was also the only game in the OutRun series to feature various selectable cars and multiple endings until OutRun 2 (2003). OutRunners was the most successful game released for Sega's System Multi 32 hardware, and one of the last successful 2D games released by Sega. OutRunners was also known for having some of the best looking graphics seen at the time, thanks to creative sprite design and a skillful use of parallax scrolling, similar to that found in Power Drift, released four years earlier.

Some routes are accessible on more than one route combination like in the original Out Run. After the initial starting stage, the player has the option of either turning east or west. West leads through San Francisco, through the Easter Islands, into Asia and either into Africa or Europe. East goes through the Grand Canyon, South America or Niagara Falls, across the Atlantic Ocean, into Europe and either into Asia or Australia.

All of the selectable cars are fictional convertibles, but bear resemblance to real automobiles. Notably, the Speed Buster closely resembles the Ferrari Testarossa featured in the original Out Run. Each car has its own set of characters, consisting of a driver and a passenger, complete with their own unique ending vignette if the player makes it to a goal. Each character set also has their own way of acting when their car crashes (flying through the air, bouncing like balls, running after the car, etc.), but unlike their Out Run counterparts, they always land right back into the car on the wheels and keep going as if nothing had happened.

== Development ==
OutRunners features all four of the songs from the original Out Run by Hiroshi Kawaguchi, as well as various new tracks composed by Takenobu Mitsuyoshi and Takayuki Nakamura, along with contributions from Kawaguchi.

== Release ==
A port of the game was released for the Mega Drive by Sega and for the Genesis by Data East. It featured a forced split-screen in single player modes, where one screen focused on the player and the other on the AI. Though the graphics were merely an adaptation of the arcade version, all other features of this version were kept intact, such as the original arcade soundtrack featuring four songs from the original Out Run.

In October 1993, Atari Corporation filed a lawsuit against Sega for an alleged infringement of a patent originally created by Atari Corp. in the 1980s, and Atari sought a preliminary injunction to stop manufacturing, usage, and sales of hardware and software for the Genesis and Game Gear. On September 28, 1994, both parties reached a settlement involving a cross-licensing agreement to publish up to five games each year across their systems until 2001. The Genesis version is one of the first five games approved from the deal by Sega in order to be converted for the Atari Jaguar, but it was never released.

== Reception ==
Reception

Review scores
| Publication | Score |
|---|---|
| GamePro | 4/5 (Genesis) |
| Mega | 20% (Mega Drive) |

In Japan, Game Machine listed OutRunners on their July 1, 1993, issue as being the most-successful upright/cockpit arcade unit of the month. It went on to be Japan's fourth highest-grossing dedicated arcade game of 1994, and tenth highest of 1995.

In North America, Play Meter listed it to be the seventh most-popular arcade game in October 1993, and then the top-grossing deluxe arcade game in November 1993. It ended the year as one of America's top seven best-selling arcade games of 1993, for which it received a Gold award in sales achievement from the American Amusement Machine Association.

== Online version ==
In May 1993, one year after its arcade release, Sega of Japan demonstrated an online game version of OutRunners, allowing up to eight players to play the game across two different cities in Japan. It was the first online arcade game to be demonstrated, with two separate OutRunner four-player cabinets connected in Tokyo and Osaka connected online via an Integrated Services Digital Network (ISDN) operated by Nippon Telegraph and Telephone (NTT). Sega announced plans for a Japanese release in July 1993. One month later, AT&T announced plans with Sega of America to introduce a similar online console gaming system for the Sega Genesis.
