= Girl's Garden =

1985 video game

- Developer: Sega
- Publisher: Sega
- Programmers: Yuji Naka; Hiroshi Kawaguchi
- Composers: Tohru Nakabayashi; Katsuhiro Hayashi
- Platform: SG-1000
- Release: JP: January 1985
- Genre: Action
- Mode: Single-player

Girl's Garden (Note: Japanese: ガールズガーデン, Hepburn: Gāruzu Gāden) is an action game developed and published by Sega for the SG-1000 console in 1985. The game follows a girl as she gathers flowers to win the love of a boy. It was the debut work of Sega programmers Yuji Naka and Hiroshi Kawaguchi. Naka went on to co-create the Sonic the Hedgehog series and Kawaguchi would later compose music for popular Sega arcade games.

== Gameplay ==
After a successful stage, Papri presents the boy with flowers.

Girl's Garden is an arcade-style action game. The player controls a young girl named Papri as she collects flowers to win the affection of a boy. During each round, the player must collect a certain number of flowers and give them to the boy before time expires and the boy meets another girl. The stages are maze-like and populated with hostile enemies including bears. Papri has a limited set of power-ups to help avoid enemies.

== Development ==
Girl's Garden was the first game developed for Sega by programmers Yuji Naka and Hiroshi Kawaguchi. After Naka joined Sega in April 1984, he was asked by his supervisor to try developing games for girls as part of his initial month of training. Naka collaborated with Kawaguchi, another new programmer at Sega, and showed their progress on Girl's Garden to their supervisor after about two months. Their boss decided it was good enough to be worked into a full game and sold for the SG-1000.

Development on Girl's Garden lasted five months. Hardware limitations made scrolling the screen and displaying many sprites difficult. Since the system could only render four sprites per scanline, Naka and Kawaguchi instead drew the enemy bears in the background. It was difficult to scroll the background layer while also moving the bears around the screen and animating the blooming flowers. The music and sounds were programmed by Tohru Nakabayashi and Katsuhiro Hayashi.

It took three months to manufacture the ROM chips. Sega produced around 80,000 copies of Girl's Garden, half of which were sold. According to contemporary game publication Game Machine, the game was released in January 1985. In 1998, Sega Saturn Magazine (Japan) wrote that it was released in December 1984. In a 2002 interview, Naka argued that the game's development and manufacturing time meant it could not have possibly been released in 1984. He believed the game was released in February 1985, and recalled his supervisors warning him that games do not sell well in February.

== Legacy ==
Writing for USgamer, Jeremy Parish called Girl's Garden a simple "inoffensive, inessential" game, and Bob Mackey wrote that it was "one of the more technically impressive games" for the SG-1000. Girl's Garden was re-released briefly on GameTap in 2006. It could also be unlocked in the Sega 3D Fukkoku Archives 3: Final Stage compilation for the Nintendo 3DS if the player had save data for Sega 3D Fukkoku Archives. The game has been considered for release on Sega Forever.

Naka continued with Sega and went on to become one of the most renowned programmers in the gaming industry. He is most well known for programming Sonic the Hedgehog (1991) and heading Sega's Sonic Team division. Kawaguchi went on to become a music composer at Sega, writing music for arcade games like Hang-On (1985) and Out Run (1986).
