= OutRun Online Arcade =

2009 video game

- Developer: Sumo Digital
- Publisher: Sega
- Series: OutRun
- Platforms: Xbox 360 (Xbox Live Arcade), PlayStation 3 (PlayStation Network)
- Release: Xbox 360; April 15, 2009; PlayStation 3: EU: April 16, 2009
- Genre: Racing game
- Modes: Single-player, multiplayer

OutRun Online Arcade is a 2009 racing video game developed by Sumo Digital and published by Sega for Xbox 360 and Playstation 3. It is a home console port of the arcade game OutRun 2 SP. Gameplay involves players racing their choice of Ferrari through a selection of fifteen stages in the shortest time possible.

The game was released on April 15, 2009 on Xbox Live Arcade and released exclusively in Europe for the PlayStation 3 a day later via the PlayStation Network. It received generally favorable reviews from critics. The upgraded high definition graphics were lauded, but reviews criticized the absence of cars and stages that were present in other versions of Outrun 2.

== Gameplay ==
In OutRun Online Arcade, the player controls a car to race through a sub-set of five stages (from among a total set of fifteen stages). Upon reaching the end of each stage area within the time limit, the player drives through a transition zone and encounters a fork in the road that allows the player to choose one of two stages. The left route is always the relatively easier option, while the right is the more difficult course. The game times the player's performance, and passing through checkpoints award the player with extra time. Once the timer reaches zero or the player completes the race, the game ends.

OutRun Online Arcade features the same arcade-style gameplay found throughout the OutRun series.

=== Modes ===
OutRun Online Arcade includes four modes of play: OutRun, Time Attack, Continuous Race, and Heart Attack. In OutRun mode, the player drives through five of fifteen stages, selecting them en route. The Continuous mode is similar to OutRun mode, but instead the player must drive through all fifteen stages. As in previous games in the series, there is a time limit that is extended upon passing checkpoints. Time Attack mode has the player race a ghost car over a pre-selected set of stages while timed. Time checks are presented to the player at various points on each stage.

Heart Attack mode expands on OutRun mode. In addition to attempting to complete certain stages, a passenger riding in the player's vehicle will frequently request certain stunts and actions. These requests can include passing cars, drifting around bends, driving through marked lanes, knocking over cones, and avoiding crashes into objects for as long as possible. If successful, the player receives hearts from the passenger. Crashing into the scenery results in the player losing hearts. At the end of each section and stage, the player is graded based on the number of hearts received. Should the player reach a goal with a satisfying grade, a romantic ending is displayed.

=== Multiplayer ===
Players can also compete in multiplayer races with up to six players. The hosting player can adjust options for the race, including the ability to toggle vehicle collisions, give a speed boost to allow slower players to catch up, and set the vehicle performance to normal or tuned. Online leaderboards are also present in the game, divided by game mode, vehicle performance setting, and driving stage.

== Development ==
Partially based on OutRun 2006: Coast 2 Coast, the game contains the fifteen courses from OutRun 2 SP and ten officially licensed Ferraris. OutRun Online Arcade also supports online head-to-head play for six players, as well as high definition graphics. To promote the game, Sega Europe held a contest in which the winner of a race would receive a trip to Maranello, Italy, where Ferraris are manufactured. The game was released for the Xbox 360 on April 15, 2009, and was part of Microsoft's Days Of Arcade promotion. The PlayStation 3 release followed one day later, exclusive to the European region.

The release occurred prior to Microsoft's raising the maximum size of Xbox Live Arcade titles to 2 gigabytes later that fall. Developer Sumo Digital had only 350 megabytes of total storage available. In order to fit the game into the size restrictions, several elements of OutRun 2006: Coast 2 Coast were removed from the game, including the fifteen original OutRun 2 stages, several cars, and the player's choice of a passenger. Reviewers speculated that the developer would release additional content, bringing some of the lost content back as downloadable content, but to date no downloadable content has been released.

=== Delisting ===
OutRun Online Arcade was removed from PlayStation Network in October 2010 and from Xbox Live Arcade in December 2011 due to the expiration of the licensing contract with Ferrari.

== Reception ==
Reception

Aggregate score
| Aggregator | Score | |
| Aggregator | PS3 | Xbox 360 |
|---|---|---|
| Metacritic | 78/100 | 79/100 |

Review scores
| Publication | Score | |
| Publication | PS3 | Xbox 360 |
|---|---|---|
| 1Up.com | N/A | B+ |
| Edge | 8/10 | 8/10 |
| Eurogamer | 8/10 | 8/10 |
| GamePro | N/A | 4.5/5 |
| GameRevolution | B | B |
| GameSpot | N/A | 7.5/10 |
| IGN | N/A | 8/10 |
| PlayStation Official Magazine – UK | 7/10 | N/A |
| Official Xbox Magazine (US) | N/A | 5.5/10 |
| Retro Gamer | 95% | N/A |
| Teletext GameCentral | N/A | 8/10 |

At the time of its release, OutRun Online Arcade received "generally favorable reviews" on both platforms according to the review aggregation website Metacritic.

Reviewers generally praised the arcade-style gameplay and the HD resolution and other graphical improvements made to the OutRun 2 engine. GamePro noted the game's high replay value and reasonable price. IGN favorably compared the game to the original 1986 Out Run, adding that it was a great option if "you're looking to waste a few hours drifting". GameRevolution called the game and its European PS3 import "one of the better-looking 3D games on Xbox Live Arcade and PlayStation Network", citing graphical improvements to the cars in addition to the new lens flare and light bloom features.

Some reviewers complained of faulty multiplayer components. VideoGamer.com felt the online portion was lacking considering the inclusion of the word online in the game's title. 1Up.com noted that though the game was worth the price, they would have preferred to pay a higher price to have additional content and a more stable online experience. GameRevolution also expressed disappointment in the fact that game modes and cars from OutRun 2 and OutRun 2006 were excluded from the game.

The game was first in sales on Xbox Live Arcade for the two weeks following its release, dropping to seventh during the third week.
