= OutRun (series) =

Racing game series by Sega

- Logo for the original Out Run
- Genre: Racing
- Developers: Sega AM2; Sumo Digital; Probe Entertainment
- Publisher: Sega
- Creator: Yu Suzuki
- First release: Out Run; 1986
- Latest release: OutRun Online Arcade; 2009

OutRun (Note: Japanese: アウトラン, Hepburn: Auto Ran) is a Japanese series of racing games developed and published by Sega and created by Yu Suzuki. In most OutRun games, players drive a Ferrari through different locations within a time limit to impress their passenger girlfriend.

The original Out Run was released in arcades in 1986. It sold 30,000 units worldwide and millions of copies in ports for home consoles. It was followed by Turbo OutRun (1989) and the console games Battle Out Run (1989), Out Run Europa (1991) and OutRunners (1993). Sega released the first OutRun with 3D graphics, OutRun 2, in arcades and on Xbox in 2003. It was followed by OutRun Online Arcade for Xbox Live Arcade and the PlayStation Network in 2009.

== History ==
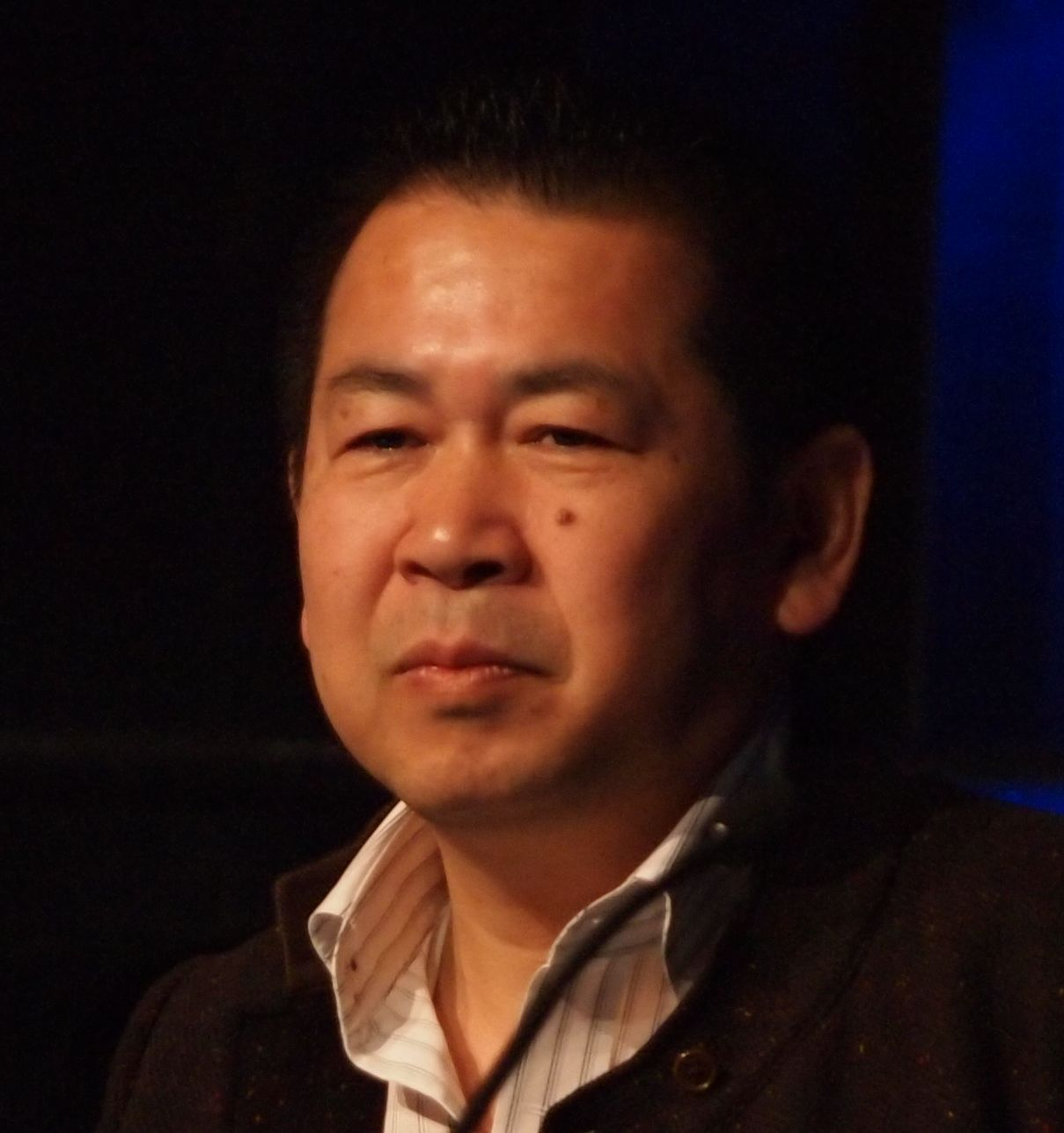
OutRun was created by Yu Suzuki (pictured in 2011).

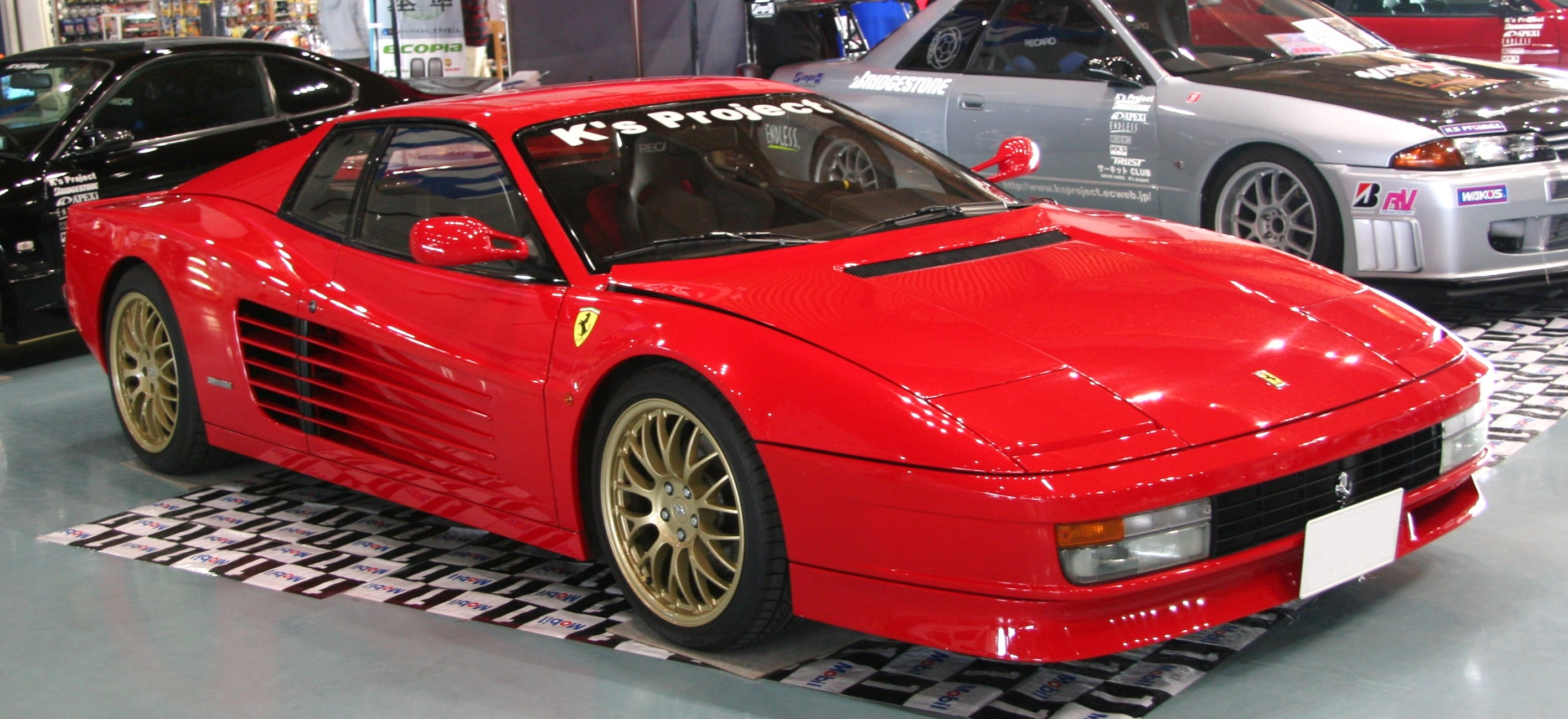
OutRun games feature cars modeled on Ferrari sports cars, such as this Ferrari Testarossa. Sega did not license the brand for the original Out Run, but paid a settlement fee after Ferrari complained and acquired a license for later games.

=== Out Run (1986) ===
Out Run was created by Yu Suzuki. It was released in arcades in September 1986 and ported to systems including the Master System, Genesis, PC-Engine, Game Gear, Commodore 64 and Sega Saturn. Its sprite-scaling and 3D motion provided a smoother experience than other arcade games of the time. Along with the Sega game Hang-On, also created by Suzuki, Out Run was one of the earliest games to place the camera behind the car, rather than the aerial view used in other games at the time. Sega sold 30,000 Out Run arcade cabinets worldwide and millions of console copies.

=== Turbo OutRun (1989) ===
Turbo OutRun was released as an upgrade kit for the Out Run arcade cabinet. It features 16 stages based on US locations including New York City, Chicago and Los Angeles. Its additions include a boost button, weather effects, enemy police cars, and the ability to upgrade the car between races. It removed the branching paths of the original. It was ported to the Genesis, FM Towns, Amiga, Atari ST and Commodore 64, IBM PC, ZX Spectrum, and Nintendo 3DS.

=== Battle Out Run (1989) ===
Battle Out Run was released for the Master System in 1989 exclusively in Europe and Brazil. Hardcore Gaming 101 described it as "rip-off" of Chase HQ by Taito, and "a five-minute curiosity at best".

=== Out Run Europa (1991) ===
Release timeline
1986	Out Run
1987
1988	OutRun 3-D
1989	Turbo OutRun
1989	Battle Out Run
1990
1991	Out Run Europa
1992	OutRunners
1993	OutRun 2019
1994–2002
2003	OutRun 2
2004–2005
2006	OutRun 2006: Coast 2 Coast
2007–2008
2009	OutRun Online Arcade

Out Run Europa was published by US Gold in 1991 for the Game Gear, Master System and various home computers. It was developed by Probe Entertainment, who had created the computer ports of Out Run and Turbo Out Run. Players pursue criminals through Europe, switching between vehicles including a motorcycle, jet skit, Porsche, motorboat and Ferrari.

=== OutRunners (1993) ===
OutRunners was developed by Sega AM-2 and released for arcades in 1993. It uses Sega's Multi 32 board, allowing for faster action and smoother sprite scaling.

=== OutRun 2019 (1993) ===
OutRun 2019 is futuristic racing game developed for the Genesis by Hertz and published by SIMS. It was conceived as a Sega CD game, Cyber Road. After development moved to the Genesis, Sega granted SIMS the use of the OutRun name. It has a darker feel than other OutRun games, and Hardcore Gaming 101 said it felt "more like a depressing version of F-Zero than OutRun", with a soundtrack of "bad techno".

=== OutRun 2 (2003) ===
OutRun 2 was developed by Sega-AM2 and released for arcades in 2003. It was the first OutRun game to use 3D graphics instead of sprites. For OutRun 2, Ferrari licensed its brand to Sega. OutRun 2 was ported to Xbox by Sumo Digital. In 2004, Sega released an updated version, OutRun 2 SP, with 15 new stages, including Easter Island and Las Vegas. In Europe and the US, it was ported to PC, PlayStation 2, Xbox and PlayStation Portable as OutRun 2006: Coast to Coast. As of 2008, OutRun SP and OutRun 2006 were no longer available to purchase digitally as the Ferrari license had expired. A mobile version, OutRun Mobile, was released. Hardcore Gaming 101 described it as "ugly, choppy, and not at all faithful to the original".

=== OutRun Online Arcade (2009) ===
OutRun Online Arcade was developed by Sumo Digital and released in April 2009 on Xbox Live Arcade and in Europe via the PlayStation Network. Partially based on OutRun 2006: Coast 2 Coast, it contains the fifteen courses from OutRun 2 SP and ten licensed Ferraris. OutRun Online Arcade supports high-definition graphics and online competitive play for six players.

== Gameplay ==
In most OutRun games, players drive a Ferrari through different locations within a time limit to impress their passenger girlfriend. According to Wired, compared to other racing games, OutRun is "laid back and casual, offering a leisurely drive more than a race .... welcoming, rather than challenging".

== Film ==
On April 21, 2025, Universal Pictures announced that it was developing a live-action film based on OutRun with Michael Bay directing, Jayson Rothwell writing and Sydney Sweeney producing.
