= Sega 3D Reprint Archives =

Sega 3D Reprint Archives (Note: Japanese: セガ3D復刻アーカイブス, Hepburn: Sega 3D Fukkoku Ākaibusu) is a trilogy of video game compilations for Nintendo 3DS developed by M2 and published by Sega. The compilations each feature enhanced versions of older Sega games with added stereoscopic 3D, most of which had previously been released individually on 3DS under the Sega 3D Reprint (Note: Japanese: セガ3D復刻, Hepburn: Sega 3D Fukkoku) label, known outside of Japan as 3D Classics.

== Development ==
Games in the series were developed by M2. Many of the Sega 3D Classics are remakes of games that originally used Sega's "Super Scaler" technology, which created a pseudo-3D effect by rapidly rotating and scaling large numbers of sprites.

Some of the Sega 3D Classics provide options that try to emulate the arcade experience, such as option to enable motion controls or show the screen tilt in games like After Burner II and Super Hang-On. 3D Sonic the Hedgehog allows players to switch between the Japanese and international versions of the game. Some Sega 3D Classics introduce new features altogether, such as "Super Dolphin" invincibility mode in Ecco the Dolphin and the Spin Dash in Sonic the Hedgehog (which is a technique originally introduced in Sonic the Hedgehog 2).

The cover artwork for the collections was illustrated by Pokémon character designer Ken Sugimori.

== Release ==
Eight of the Sega 3D Classics comprised the retail title Sega 3D Reprint Archives, released on 18 December 2014, in Japan. It has not been released outside Japan, although the titles it is composed of were released on the Nintendo eShop internationally throughout 2013 and 2015 (all the component games had been released in Japan prior to the release of the compilation).

The second group of Sega 3D Classics were released in Japan starting in December 2013; in the West, they were released in 2015, with one of the five coming out each month. In Australia, after the release of 3D After Burner II, all remaining SEGA 3D Classics were delayed indefinitely; while many of the games were classified by the Australian Classification Board much earlier, they were not released in Australia until 2 July 2015.

== Reception of the series ==
The Verge's Sam Byford complimented the Sega 3D Classics for making stereoscopic 3D "a feature", calling the 3D Classics "the most impressive use of 3D on Nintendo's console to date". Byford also commented that the added depth perception makes some of the games easier to play.

GamesRadar's Justin Towell praised the conversion of Super Hang-On to stereoscopic 3D, but noted that the 3D effect seems "a bit uneven in the far distance", and criticized the optional screen-tilt feature (which attempts to emulate sitting on a bike in an arcade) as pointless. Towell complimented 3D Space Harrier for its various screen modes and control options (especially the touch screen mode), as well as the new time trial mode. He also enjoyed the CRT TV simulation displayed in 3D Sonic the Hedgehog and 3D Altered Beast, although he found the effect fuzzy in Altered Beast due to the slow pace.

== Sega 3D Reprint Archives ==
Sega 3D Reprint Archives
- Developer: M2
- Publisher: Sega
- Platform: Nintendo 3DS
- Release: JP: 18 December 2014
- Genre: Various
- Modes: Single-player, multiplayer

Sega 3D Reprint Archives (Note: セガ3D復刻アーカイブス, Sega 3D Fukkoku Ākaibusu) is the first compilation in the Sega 3D Reprint Archives series. It was released exclusively in Japan on 18 December 2014.

=== Games ===
Title	Original system	Original release	Japan	North America	Europe	Australia
Ecco the Dolphin	Sega Genesis	1992	26 June 2013	12 December 2013	12 December 2013	12 December 2013
Fantasy Zone: Opa-Opa Bros.	Arcade	1986	19 March 2014	12 February 2015	12 February 2015	2 July 2015
Out Run	Arcade	1986	23 April 2014	12 March 2015	12 March 2015	2 July 2015
OutRun 3-D	Master System	1988	18 December 2014 (Note: Exclusive to Sega 3D Fukkoku Archives)	Unreleased	Unreleased	Unreleased
Shinobi III: Return of the Ninja Master	Sega Genesis	1993	7 August 2013	19 December 2013	19 December 2013	19 December 2013
Space Harrier	Arcade	1985	26 December 2012	28 November 2013	28 November 2013	28 November 2013
Space Harrier 3-D	Master System	1988	18 December 2014	Unreleased	Unreleased	Unreleased
Streets of Rage	Sega Genesis	1991	21 August 2013	19 December 2013	19 December 2013	19 December 2013

== Sega 3D Reprint Archives 2/Classics Collection ==
Sega 3D Classics Collection
- Artwork illustrated by Ken Sugimori
- Developer: M2
- Publisher: Sega
- Platform: Nintendo 3DS
- Release: JP: 23 December 2015; NA: 26 April 2016; EU: 4 November 2016
- Genre: Various
- Modes: Single-player, multiplayer (Wi-Fi only)

Sega 3D Classics Collection (Note: セガ3D復刻アーカイブス2, Sega 3D Fukkoku Ākaibusu 2; Sega 3D Reprint Archives 2) is the second compilation in the Sega 3D Reprint Archives series. It is the only title in the series to be released outside of Japan. It was released in Japan on 23 December 2015, in North America on 26 April 2016, and in Europe on 4 November.

In Japan, Sega 3D Reprint Archives 1 & 2 Double Pack (Note: セガ3D復刻アーカイブス1&2 ダブルパック), a retail box containing both this compilation and the original Sega 3D Reprint Archives, was released on 23 December 2015 (the same day as this compilation).

It includes ten games, five (three in Japan) of which have not been released separately on the Nintendo eShop. There are two extra games (Fantasy Zone II: The Tears of Opa-Opa and Maze Hunter 3D) available in the extras menu, and one secret game (Fantasy Zone), unlocked by tapping the lower left corner of the extras screen, then tapping the enemy that appears.

=== Games ===
Title	Original system	Original release	Japan	North America	Europe	Australia
Altered Beast	Sega Genesis	1988	29 May 2013	5 December 2013	5 December 2013	5 December 2013
Fantasy Zone (Note: Secret unlockable game in Sega 3D Classics Collection)	Master System	1986	23 December 2015 (Note: Exclusive to Sega 3D Classics Collection)	26 April 2016	4 November 2016	4 November 2016
Fantasy Zone II W	Arcade	2008	16 July 2014	16 April 2015	16 April 2015	2 July 2015
Fantasy Zone II: The Tears of Opa-Opa	Master System	1987	23 December 2015	26 April 2016	4 November 2016	4 November 2016
Galaxy Force II	Arcade	1988	24 July 2013	12 December 2013	12 December 2013	12 December 2013
Maze Walker	Master System	1988	23 December 2015	26 April 2016	4 November 2016	4 November 2016
Power Drift	Arcade	1988	23 December 2015	26 April 2016 (Note: Exclusive to Sega 3D Classics Collection outside of Japan.)	4 November 2016	4 November 2016
Puyo Puyo 2	Arcade	1994	23 December 2015	26 April 2016	4 November 2016	4 November 2016
Sonic the Hedgehog	Sega Genesis	1991	15 May 2013	5 December 2013	5 December 2013	5 December 2013
Thunder Blade	Arcade	1987	20 August 2014	14 May 2015	14 May 2015	2 July 2015

=== Reception ===
Reception

Aggregate score
Aggregator	Score
Metacritic	73/100

Sega 3D Classics Collection received "mixed or average" reviews from critics according to aggregate review website Metacritic.

== Sega 3D Reprint Archives 3: Final Stage ==
Sega 3D Reprint Archives 3: Final Stage
- Artwork illustrated by Ken Sugimori
- Developer: M2
- Publisher: Sega
- Platform: Nintendo 3DS
- Release: JP: 22 December 2016
- Genre: Various
- Modes: Single-player, multiplayer

Sega 3D Reprint Archives 3: Final Stage (Note: セガ3D復刻アーカイブス3 FINAL STAGE, Sega 3D Fukkoku Ākaibusu 3 FINAL STAGE; Sega 3D Reprint Archives 3 FINAL STAGE) is the third compilation in the Sega 3D Reprint Archives series. It was released exclusively in Japan on 22 December 2016. A retail box containing all three compilations, the Sega 3D Reprint Archives 1, 2 & 3 Triple Box (Note: セガ3D復刻アーカイブス1・2・3 トリプルパック), was released on the same day.

The compilation was delisted from Nintendo eShop on 21 December 2022, alongside 3D After Burner II.

Time Extension included Final Stage on its "Best Nintendo 3DS Games of All Time" list.

=== Games ===
Title	Original system	Original release	Japan	North America	Europe	Australia
After Burner II	Arcade	1987	18 December 2013 (Note: Delisted on 21 December 2022 digitally in Japan.)	15 January 2015	15 January 2015	15 January 2015
Alien Syndrome	Arcade	1987	22 December 2016 (Note: Exclusive to Sega 3D Fukkoku Archives 3: Final Stage; delisted on 21 December 2022 digitally in Japan.)	Unreleased	Unreleased	Unreleased
Champion Boxing (Note: Secret unlockable game in Sega 3D Fukkoku Archives 3: Final Stage)	SG-1000	1984	22 December 2016	Unreleased	Unreleased	Unreleased
Columns	Sega Genesis	1990	22 December 2016	Unreleased	Unreleased	Unreleased
Girl's Garden	SG-1000	1984	22 December 2016	Unreleased	Unreleased	Unreleased
Gunstar Heroes (Note: Developed by Sega and Treasure)	Sega Genesis	1993	24 June 2015	20 August 2015	20 August 2015	20 August 2015
Sonic the Hedgehog 2	Sega Genesis	1992	22 July 2015	8 October 2015	8 October 2015	8 October 2015
Streets of Rage 2	Sega Genesis	1992	29 April 2015	23 July 2015	23 July 2015	23 July 2015
Super Hang-On	Arcade	1987	27 March 2013	28 November 2013	28 November 2013	28 November 2013
Thunder Force III (Note: Developed by Sega and Technosoft)	Sega Genesis	1990	22 December 2016	Unreleased	Unreleased	Unreleased
Turbo OutRun	Arcade	1989	22 December 2016	Unreleased	Unreleased	Unreleased

== See also ==
- 3D Classics, a separate line of 3D re-releases developed by Arika and published by Nintendo
