= Rad Mobile =

1990 video game

- Japanese arcade flyer, depicting the deluxe cabinet at the bottom left
- Developer: Sega AM3 (Note: Saturn version developed by System Sacom.)
- Publisher: Sega
- Platforms: Arcade, Sega Saturn
- Release: Arcade: JP: October 3, 1990; UK: January 1991; WW: February 1991; Saturn: JP: December 2, 1994
- Genre: Racing
- Modes: Single-player, multiplayer
- Arcade system: Sega System 32

Rad Mobile (Note: Japanese: ラッドモビール, Hepburn: Raddo Mobīru) is a racing arcade game developed by Sega AM3 and published by Sega. It was first published in Japan in October 1990, followed by an international release for arcades in February 1991. Rad Mobile was Sega's first 32-bit game, using Sega's System 32 arcade system board. It was also the first ever appearance of Sonic the Hedgehog, who appears as an ornament hanging from the driver's rearview mirror.

The game was ported to the Sega Saturn in December 1994 under the name Gale Racer. (Note: Japanese: ゲイルレーサー, Hepburn: Geiru reisā) A similar game with a two-seat cabinet was also released in 1991 as Rad Rally. (Note: Japanese: ラッドラリー, Hepburn: Raddo Rarī) Rad Mobile received mixed reviews; critics praised its 3D visuals, but criticized its gameplay.

== Gameplay and development ==
Gameplay screenshot showing the 32-bit sprite graphics of the game. Sonic the Hedgehog makes his first appearance, hanging above the rear view mirror.

Similar to Turbo OutRun, the concept behind Rad Mobile is a race against opponents across the United States. Players must race across the country while also avoiding police cars. At certain points in the race, the road forks, allowing players to skip several stages. The game's weather and time of day changes, sometimes requiring players to turn on windshield wipers or headlights. Rad Mobile was also the first appearance of Sonic the Hedgehog, appearing as a decorative item hanging from the driver's rearview mirror. Sonic's appearance in the game predated his debut in Sonic the Hedgehog for the Sega Genesis by eight months. Interested in getting their new character visible to the public, Sonic Team approved of his appearance in the game.

Credit is usually given to Yu Suzuki and his Sega AM2 division, the developers of Out Run, which established the formula of Rad Mobile's gameplay but Suzuki has not listed it in any of his official lists of works. Zach Whalen, an associate professor with the University of Mary Washington, located a segment of text in the game's source code suggesting that Sega AM3 was the actual developer of the game. In a 1991 interview, AM3 head Hisao Oguchi made mention of AM3's involvement in Rad Mobile's development. Sega's AM4 division, at the time a designer of arcade cabinets, had involvement with constructing the game's deluxe cabinet that would bank and turn, and featured functioning brake lights, while the game was also released in an upright cabinet.

== Release ==
The arcade game was first published in Japan on October 3, 1990, at the JAMMA Show. Rad Mobile was Sega's debut of its System 32 arcade system board, Sega's last arcade board to utilize sprites in place of 3D polygons. The game made its overseas debut at the Amusement Trade Exhibition in the United Kingdom in January 1991, followed by its international release in February. A version of Rad Mobile was demonstrated at Japanese trade shows operating in Sega's R360 cabinet, but no record of a release has been found. Later the same year, Sega released Rad Rally, based on Rad Mobile but with changes and the addition of two-player multiplayer. Rad Rally was released in a two-seat arcade cabinet.

In 1994, a port of Rad Mobile was released only in Japan for the Sega Saturn, as Gale Racer. Its release was much later than the arcade version due to the Genesis' hardware being insufficient to play the game. Gale Racer was directed by Tomohiro Kondo, who had worked on the Panzer Dragoon series, and designed by Takashi Yuda, responsible for the design of The Revenge of Shinobi. As part of the port, designs of the cars were changed to polygons in place of the original sprites.

== Reception and legacy ==
Reception

Review scores
Publication	Score
Beep! MegaDrive	3.5/5 (ARC)
Consoles +	85% (SAT)
Famitsu	24/40 (SAT)
Joypad	35% (SAT)
Mean Machines Sega	35% (SAT)
Sinclair User	74% (ARC)

At the time of its release, the arcade game was commercially successful in Japan. Rad Mobile was the fourth highest-grossing dedicated arcade game of 1991 in Japan, while Rad Rally was the year's seventh highest-grossing dedicated arcade game in Japan.

Rad Mobile was generally praised for its graphics but criticized for its gameplay. Sinclair User stated that Sega "concentrated on the technology and forgot about the gameplay". Reviewer John Cook called the gameplay "dull" and stated there was little to do in the game other than stare at the visuals. John Cook also reviewed Rad Mobile in The One, stating that it employs "some astonishing effects, but little or no gameplay" and suggests GP Rider as an alternative, stating that "some will enjoy [Rad Mobile] because it's loud and colourful, but afficionados [sic] will stick to GP Rider". Computer and Video Games gave a review stating that the game is "technically superb" and has "exceptionally realistic 3D" but lacks anything to stimulate addictive gameplay. In a March 1991 review, Ace described Rad Mobile as "high on visuals and low on gameplay". Beep! Mega Drive praised the way the car used the windshield wiper in the rain, and headlights at night.

Gale Racer received a negative reception, with Horowitz stating that based on the talent behind the Saturn port, "one would have expected nothing short of the best home racing game ever made". Computer and Video Games detested Gale Racer, criticizing the gameplay, visuals, and hypothesizing that it was rushed out to shelves to tie in with the Saturn's release.

Retrospectively, video game historian Ken Horowitz has stated that Rad Mobile has struggled to be recognized as an influential racing game, though he reinforces that the game deserves at least some recognition as Sega's first 32-bit racing game and as the first appearance of Sonic the Hedgehog. Martin Dodd of Retro Gamer compared the game's graphics to Power Drift and called the game "very good for the time with it being 32-bit". Writing for AllGame, Anthony Baize gave a positive retrospective review, calling the graphics "better than any racing game that preceded it".
