= Fantasy Zone II: The Tears of Opa-Opa =

1987 Video game

- Master System box art
- Developer: Sega (Note: Famicom version developed by Sanritsu; MSX2 version developed by Atelier Double; System 16 remake developed by M2.)
- Publishers: Sega: Famicom; Sunsoft; MSX2; Pony Canyon
- Composers: Tokuhiko Uwabo; System 16 remake Manabu Namiki
- Series: Fantasy Zone
- Platforms: Mark III/Master System, arcade, Famicom, MSX2
- Release: October 17, 1987: Mark III/Master System; JP: October 17, 1987; NA: December 1987; EU: January 1988 Arcade; JP: February 1988 Famicom; JP: December 20, 1988 MSX2; JP: 1989
- Genre: Scrolling shooter
- Mode: Single-player
- Arcade system: Sega System E

Fantasy Zone II: The Tears of Opa-Opa (Note: Japanese: ファンタジーゾーンII オパオパの涙, Hepburn: Fantajī Zōn tsū: Opa-Opa no Namida) is a 1987 horizontally scrolling shooter video game developed and published by Sega for the Master System. It was ported to the arcade, Famicom, and MSX2, and was remade for the System 16 hardware on a PlayStation 2 compilation in 2008. It was re-released on the Wii Virtual Console in North America on June 29, 2009. The player controls a sentient spaceship named Opa-opa who fights surreal invader enemies. Like the first Fantasy Zone, Fantasy Zone II departs from scrolling shooter themes with its bright colors and whimsical designs. For this reason, it is occasionally dubbed a "cute 'em up".

== Plot ==
In the past, the courageous hero Opa-Opa saved the Fantasy Zone from the invading Menon forces, but his victory came at a price as he was forced to fight his own father who led the invasion. It is now Space Year 1432, 10 years after that battle, and the Nenon forces are spreading chaos through the Fantasy Zone. Opa-Opa must once again fly into the Fantasy Zone to rout the invasion.

At the end of the game, Opa-Opa comes face-to-face with the invasion's mastermind: an identical copy of himself. After a tense battle, Opa-Opa's father appears to confront them, and the sight of him brings Opa-Opa to tears which causes the second Opa-Opa to vanish. It is later revealed that this twin is a physical manifestation of Opa-Opa's dark impulses and desires, spawned from a war that took place during his childhood, and seeking to drive the Fantasy Zone into ruin. Reunited with his father, Opa-Opa is able to purge this darkness from himself and swears that such a disaster will never occur again.

== Gameplay ==
Screenshot

Similar to Defender, the player occupies a side-scrolling level that repeats indefinitely, and in which the player can freely travel left or right. Each zone contains several "bases" that serve as primary targets. New to the sequel are "warps" hidden behind certain bases that allow the player to travel between different zones. Each level has at least three zones, and when all of the bases have been cleared in all of the zones of a level, the player can travel through the warp to the boss.

Boss fights do not allow for free travel as the main stages do, and force the player to face the boss or face a particular direction. Bosses are generally very large and change color to reflect damage taken. The final stage is a "boss rush" in which the player must fight a succession of previous bosses before fighting the final boss.

There are two action buttons that correspond to two types of attacks, "fire" and "bomb". The fire attacks shoot horizontally, as in a typical shooter, and different variants can be purchased at shops. The bomb attacks are more powerful, and the basic bomb drops downward. Other variants have other behaviors and are limited in quantity.

Shops, uncovered at key points, allow the player to purchase upgraded weapons, bombs, and speed, as well as extra lives. Upgrades to Opa-Opa's speed (such as larger wings, or jet engines) are permanent as long as the player does not lose a life, but weapon upgrades are time-limited, and bombs limited in quantity. Items become increasingly expensive with subsequent purchases, encouraging the player to vary their purchases.

== Reception ==
The Master System port received positive reviews. Computer and Video Games scored it 88% in 1990. Console XS scored it 90% score in 1992.

== Ports ==
The arcade version of Fantasy Zone II is based on the System E board, and as a result, is almost identical to the Master System version. Differences include the use of the radar that shows which bases are destroyed or not, as well as the use of a timer that, when it reaches zero, the player will lose a life. If the player manages to clear a level, the timer's remaining seconds will add to the score and money.

Unlike the original version, the Famicom port's subtitle on the title screen says The Teardrop of Opa-opa.

== System 16 remake ==
Screenshot of Fantasy Zone II: The Tears of Opa-Opa (System 16 version)

On September 11, 2008, Sega released a remake of Fantasy Zone II, as part of the compilation Sega Ages Vol. 33 Fantasy Zone Complete Collection. Developed by M2, the game is unique from most remakes in that it is not an attempt to modernize an older work, but rather a ground-up reimagining of the title as arcade game on System 16 hardware like its predecessor, rather than a console title for the more limited Master System. It has been described as a "What If" remake, and strictly adheres to the technical limitations of the time in which Fantasy Zone II was originally released.

M2 CEO Naoki Horii has stated that the remake was inspired by his disappointment that Fantasy Zone never got a true arcade sequel: "I played the SMS game a lot, but in my heart of hearts, I really wanted to see it on arcade hardware." To ensure the remake would be authentic to the System 16's unique hardware capabilities and limitations, M2 developed the title on real System 16 hardware, with a modest memory increase to 256 KB, which M2 dubbed System 16C, and is playable in the compilation via the company's emulation technology. It shows a 1987 SEGA copyright, makes no mention of M2, and bears no titular distinction from the original game. Because of this it can be easily confused for a real arcade title from 1987. Fans have dubbed this version Fantasy Zone II DX to distinguish it from the original versions. This remake was beyond the scope of features requested by Sega and the available budget, so Horii funded development out-of-pocket for an amount he described as "about the cost of a new car".

It follows the original Fantasy Zone II only very loosely, pulling enemies, music, locations, and gameplay elements from the Master System game and pairing them with completely new content and elements of the original arcade Fantasy Zone. The most notable change is to the level structure. Rather than having several distinct zones in each stage that must be cleared, each stage in the remake has two parallel dimensions (Bright Side and Dark Side) of comparable size to the levels in the first Fantasy Zone. Bases destroyed in one dimension will also be destroyed in the other, making it possible to clear the level entirely on one side or the other. The Dark Side is more difficult, but offers greater rewards in points and money earned. Bosses are the same on either side, but have considerably more difficult attack patterns on the dark side. The game also features three endings, which depend on both whether the Dark Side levels were cleared and whether some specific items were bought. Getting the bad ending results in a game over.

The music, arranged by Manabu Namiki, uses melodies of many songs from Tokuhiko Uwabo's original Fantasy Zone II soundtrack, but is calculatedly rearranged in a style more similar to that of the original Fantasy Zone's composer, Hiroshi Kawaguchi. Namiki also wrote original tracks for the game. Stages and enemies are largely based on themes from the original, but some are difficult to recognize. Only about half of the game's bosses correspond to those in the original. It is generally regarded as a very loose interpretation of the original.

M2 released a free demo of their version of Fantasy Zone II on their website that lets the user download and play the first and second levels on a Windows computer.

The game was bootlegged and released to the arcades under the title FZ-2006 II by Taiwanese manufacturer ISG. The bootleg bears a 2006 copyright date but actually appears to be derived from the 2008 PlayStation 2 release due to it containing the same "2008-07-15VER" string embedded in the ROM data. Sega also produced a limited number of arcade units running real System 16 hardware to promote the game's release.

A Nintendo 3DS port of this 16-bit version of Fantasy Zone II was released in Japan in 2014 and internationally in 2015. Titled 3D Fantasy Zone II W, it includes new features, content, and a second game mode called Link Loop Land, an endless survival mode starring Opa-Opa's brother, Upa-Upa. It is also included in Sega 3D Classics Collection.

== See also ==
- Rieko Kodama
