= Hiroshi Kawaguchi (composer) =

Japanese composer and keyboardist (born 1965)

- 川口 博史
- Born: Hiroshi Miyauchi; April 12, 1965 (age 61); Choshi, Chiba, Japan
- Other name: Hiro
- Occupations: Composer; keyboardist
- Employer: Sega (1984–present)
- Musical career
- Genres: Video game music; synth-pop; rock; chiptune; orchestral; dance
- Instrument: Keyboards
- Website: dekaris.sega.jp/team/hiro/

Hiroshi Kawaguchi (川口 博史, Kawaguchi Hiroshi; born April 12, 1965) is a Japanese video game music composer and keyboardist who works for Sega. He is among the oldest of the Sega sound team members, and one of the few from the 1980s still active today. He joined Sega in 1984 as a programmer before transferring to the sound department the following year.

He is also known as Hiro and Hiroshi Miyauchi (宮内 博史) (his pre-mukoyōshi name), and has been a part of both the S.S.T. Band and the sound unit [H.], the latter of which he leads. He has also been a member of Chain Band, a hybrid between the groups [H.] and Sonic Adventure Music Experience.

He worked closely with game designer Yu Suzuki and served as composer for some of the company's most recognized series, such as Space Harrier, Out Run, and After Burner, and has contributed music to many others. He has often acted as a tutor to new Sega composers, such as Yasuhiro Takagi and Keitaro Hanada.

== Works ==
Year	Title	Role(s)
1984	Lode Runner	Ending theme
1985	Girl's Garden	Programmer
1985	Dragon Wang	Sound
1985	Hang-On	Main theme
1985	Space Harrier	Music with Yu Suzuki
1985	Pit Pot	Music
1986	Fantasy Zone	Music
1986	Ghost House	Music
1986	Enduro Racer	Main theme
1986	Out Run	Music
1986	Alex Kidd: The Lost Stars	Music
1987	After Burner	Music
1987	After Burner II	Music
1988	Power Drift	Music
1988	Dynamite Düx	Music
1988	Hot Rod	Music with N.Y
1989	Super Monaco GP	"Theme From Super Monaco GP"
1989	Turbo Outrun	Music with Yasuhiro Takagi
1989	Sword of Vermilion	Music with Yasuhiro Takagi
1990	G-LOC: Air Battle	Music with Yasuhiro Takagi
1990	GP Rider	Music with Takenobu Mitsuyoshi and Yasuhiro Takagi
1991	Rent a Hero	Music
1991	Ninja Burai Densetsu	Music
1992	Speed Basketball	Music
1992	Dream Palace	Music
1992	Air Rescue	Sound effects
1992	Stadium Cross	Sound driver
1992	OutRunners	Music with Takayuki Nakamura and Takenobu Mitsuyoshi
1993	SegaSonic the Hedgehog	Music with Keitaro Hanada and Naoki Tokiwa
1994	Dragon Ball Z: V.R.V.S.	Music with David Leytze and Keitaro Hanada
1994	Star Wars Arcade	Sound coordinator
1994	Rail Chase The Ride: Eiyuu Fukkatsu Hen	Music
1995	Cool Riders	Arrangements
1996	Sega Touring Car Championship	Music, sound programming
1996	Fighters Megamix	Music
1996	WaveRunner	Sound with Makito Nomiya and Youichi Ueda
1996	Virtua Fighter 3	Sound programming
1996	Sega Ages: OutRun	Arrangements
1997	Sega Ages: Fantasy Zone	Vocal song arrangement
1997	Le Mans 24	Sound support
1998	Sega Ages: Power Drift	Arrangements
1999	Toy Fighter	Technical advice
2000	Rent a Hero No.1	Music with Kojiro Mikusa and Kayoko Matsushima
2000	Crackin' DJ	Music with various others
2001	Crackin' DJ Part 2	Music with various others
2001	Air Trix	Sound design
2004	Derby Owners Club Online	Music
2006	Sega Rally 2006	Music with various others
2006	OutRun 2006: Coast 2 Coast	Music with various others
2006	After Burner Climax	Arrangement
2007	OutRun 2 SP	Piano
2007	Manic Panic Ghosts	Sound director
2008	Dinosaur King	Sound supervisor
2009	Tetris Giant	Music with Susumu Tsukagoshi and Yuichi Kanatani
2009	Yakuza 3	Sound production
2009	Bayonetta	Arrangements
2010	Yakuza 4	Sound support
2011	Initial D Arcade Stage 6 AA	Support
2012	maimai	Music
2014	Gotta Protectors	Music
2016	Sangokushi Taisen 4	Music with Susumu Tsukagoshi
2018	Border Break	Music with several others
2018	Fist of the North Star: Lost Paradise	Special cooperation with Hideaki Kobayashi
2018	Sega World Drivers Championship	Music with Kazuhito Shimizu and Keitaro Hanada
2018	House of the Dead: Scarlet Dawn	Sound with Keitaro Hanada and Ryohei Kohno
2021	Virtua Fighter 5: Ultimate Showdown	Music with several others
2022	Sonic Frontiers	"Hacking Mission", "Pinball"
2023	404 GAME RE:SET	Music with several others
2023	Sonic Superstars	Music with several others
2023	Like a Dragon Gaiden	"Her Melancholy", "Hell’s Gate"
2024	Super Monkey Ball Banana Rumble	"Ba-BOOM", "Robot Smash"
2024	Shadow Generations	"White Space (Underground)"
2026	Yakuza Kiwami 3 & Dark Ties	Music with several others
