= Buggy Boy =

1985 video game

- Developer: Tatsumi
- Publishers: JP/EU: Tatsumi; NA: Data East
- Composer: Mark Cooksey (C64)
- Platforms: Arcade, Commodore 64, ZX Spectrum, Amstrad CPC, Amiga, Atari ST
- Release: JP: July 21, 1985; EU: 1985; NA: December 1985
- Genre: Racing
- Mode: Single-player

Buggy Boy, (Note: Japanese: バギーボーイ, Hepburn: Bagī Bōi) known as Speed Buggy in North America, is an off-road racing game developed by Tatsumi and released for arcades in 1985. The cockpit version of the arcade cabinet has a panoramic three-screen display, a feature previously employed in TX-1, but with Buggy Boy having a larger cabinet. An upright, single-screen cabinet was released in 1986 under the name Buggy Boy Junior.

== Gameplay ==
Arcade version screenshot

The object of the game is to drive around one of five courses (Offroad, North, East, South or West) in the shortest time possible. Each course has five legs filled with obstacles such as boulders and brick walls. Points are awarded for driving through gates and collecting flags. Offroad is a closed-circuit course that takes five laps to complete while North, South, East, and West are each a strict point A to point B style course.

The player can hit logs and tree stumps in order to jump the buggy over obstacles, gaining extra points while airborne. Extra points are rewarded for driving the buggy on two wheels.

Buggy Boy Junior

== Reception ==
Reviews (home computers)

Review scores
Publication	Score
Crash	71%
Computer and Video Games	33/40
Sinclair User	8/10
Your Sinclair	7/10
Zzap!64	97%
MicroHobby (ES)	5/5
ACE	906/1000
The Games Machine	92%

Award
Publication	Award
Zzap!64	Gold Medal

In Japan, Game Machine listed Buggy Boy on their September 1, 1985 issue as being the third most-popular upright arcade game for the previous two weeks. It went on to be one of the Japan's top five highest-grossing upright/cockpit arcade games of 1986. In the United States, Speed Buggy was one of the top five highest-grossing dedicated arcade games of 1986.

Computer and Video Games reviewed the arcade game, giving it a positive review. The review said, "if you've got nerves of steel," prepare "for the ride of your life."

Zzap!64 awarded the Commodore 64 port of the game a gold medal and a 97% score, calling it "a cracking racing game that proves totally compulsive."

Buggy Boy was included as one of the titles in the 2010 book 1001 Video Games You Must Play Before You Die.

== Legacy ==
According to Andy Smith of Advanced Computer Entertainment magazine in 1988, Sega's arcade game Power Drift (1988) combined elements from Out Run (1986) with those of Buggy Boy.
