= Cool Riders =

1995 video game

- U.S. flyer
- Developer: Sega AM1
- Publisher: Sega
- Composer: Hiroshi Kawaguchi
- Platform: Arcade
- Release: JP: April 1995; NA: September 1995
- Genre: Racing
- Modes: Single player, multiplayer
- Arcade system: Sega H1 Board

Cool Riders (Japanese: クールライダーズ) is a 1995 racing arcade game by Sega. It is the spiritual sequel to OutRunners and has a similar premise to it, though rather than driving cars, the player rides bikes. It also uses digitized graphics similar to Mortal Kombat. The Steppenwolf song "Born to Be Wild" is featured as the game's opening theme, as well as one of selectable in-race music.

Cool Riders was emulated by the MAME emulator in 2004, but it wasn't working until 2013. This is because it was the only arcade game on the Sega H1 Board hardware, which used a unique graphics compression scheme.

== Gameplay ==
The object of Cool Riders is to finish each stage ahead of a computer-controlled rival by the end of a stage's checkpoint and within the allotted time. Whoever finishes first gets to select the next stage. For every rival defeated up to stage four, the player receives a promotion, indicated on the lower left-hand corner of the screen. There are three routes to choose from (westbound and eastbound routes with a middle route that takes the player through the United States.)

There are five stages. The fifth stage is an "Extra Stage" where the object is to outrace all seven computer-controlled rival opponents on the streets of New York City to the finish line. Regardless of what happens, the player character's ending will display on a projector if the player had time left over to finish the race, followed by a map containing the route the player took to reach the Extra Stage and the finish line, followed by the word "FINISH" appearing in the center of the screen.

Sonic the Hedgehog appears in this game. When the player completes the game, his head and that of Tails are icons for the player's initials in the high score table.

The game has failure animations when the player runs out of time during a race and comes to a complete stop. The announcer says the same "game over" message as in OutRunners: "I'm sorry. You didn't make it." When this happens, mini-cutscenes depending on the character the player chose play, ranging from one character throwing a tantrum on a scooter to characters being carried or thrown off the screen, followed by a map showing the route the player took with the word "RETIRE" appearing in the center of the screen.

== Reception ==
In Japan, Game Machine listed Cool Riders on their July 15, 1995 issue as being the seventh most-successful dedicated arcade game of the month. A critic for Next Generation panned the game, commenting that "Realism is ridiculously absent, a sense of speed is almost nil, and control is plain sloppy; you practically have three directions, straight, and a left and right turn at 45 degrees. With games like Cyber Cycles eating up players' quarters, Cool Riders is just not up to par." He gave it two out of five stars.
