= Battle Out Run =

1989 video game

- Developers: Sega; Arc System Works
- Publisher: Sega
- Series: OutRun
- Platform: Master System
- Release: EU: 1989
- Genre: Racing
- Mode: Single-player

Battle Out Run is a 1989 video game released by Sega on the Master System. Despite being part of the Out Run series, this game plays little like its namesake and more like Chase H.Q., where the objective is to ram the cars of specified criminals. A notable feature is to enhance the car's attributes by buying upgrades that are inside of a truck that passes at certain moments and must be entered from the rear.

== Reception ==
Computer and Video Games reviewed the game in 1990, giving it an 80% score.
