= OutRun 2019 =

1993 video game

- European cover art
- Developer: Hertz
- Publishers: WW: Sega; JP: SIMS Co., Ltd.
- Designers: M. Taisi; M. Toma
- Composer: Shigeki Sako
- Series: OutRun
- Platform: Sega Genesis
- Release: NA: March 1993; JP: March 26, 1993; EU: April 1993
- Genre: Racing
- Mode: Single-player

OutRun 2019 (アウトラン 2019) is a 1993 racing video game for the Sega Genesis, developed by Hertz and published by SIMS. It is a sequel to Out Run (1986) that takes place a futuristic 2019. The object is to race against a time limit in a rocket-boosted car across four different stages around the world.

== Stages ==
OutRun 2019 features four different stages to race across, each one harder than the last. Most routes will split into two routes at their ends like in the original Out Run, but a few routes instead end with either a goal or a convergence with another route.

Also, throughout most of the stages, some routes will diverge, splitting into two different roadways. Usually, some of the roads will lead onto a bridge over ground, over a pit, or over water. Slipping off the bridges will cost the player precious time or force the player onto the ground route if one exists under the bridge.

Sometimes, when the roads split, they will lead to a different kind of road. This is usually seen by means of a three-way diverge sign, which means the player can choose whether to go left, right, or continue forward. For example, on one route in Stage 4, some parts of the road are covered in wet cement. Another features the player driving into a tunnel. The last will lead the player over a bridge.

Finally, there are also secret diverges that can be spotted easily. For example, some areas will have a ramp placed strategically on one side of the road. If hit correctly, the car will fly to one side, and eventually land on a secret roadway. Also, jumping off these ramps can also lead up to overhead bridges on some routes. These secret roads can usually lead to a quicker way to the next route.

== Development and release ==
OutRun 2019 was conceived as a Sega CD game, Cyber Road. After it was transferred to the Genesis, it was renamed Junker's High before Sega granted SIMS the use of the OutRun name.

In 2005, OutRun 2019 was re-released as a handheld TV game, as Play TV Legends Outrun 2019. It included a steering wheel controller.

== Reception ==
Reception

Review scores
Publication	Score
Consoles +	47
Electronic Gaming Monthly	58
GamePro	48
GamesMaster	30
Mega	45%
MegaTech	59
Sega Force	52
Sega Power	36

Hardcore Gaming 101 said OutRun 2019 felt "more like a depressing version of F-Zero than OutRun", with a soundtrack of "bad techno songs".
