= Hang-On GP =

1995 video game

- North American cover art
- Developer: Genki
- Publisher: Sega
- Producers: Bill Person; Hiroshi Aso; Mamoru Shigeta
- Designers: Akemi Watanabe; Hideki Miyasaka; Hiroshi Fujimoto
- Programmers: Kouji Ohtani; Shuichi Ohira; Tetsuya Ino
- Writer: Wendy M. Dinsmore
- Composer: Shirou Ioroi
- Series: Hang-On
- Platform: Sega Saturn
- Release: JP: 27 October 1995; NA: January 1996; EU: March 1996
- Genre: Racing
- Mode: Single-player

Hang-On GP (Note: Also known as Hang-On GP '95 (Japanese: ハングオン GP '95, Hepburn: Hang-Uon GP' 95) in Japan and Hang-On GP '96 in Europe.) is a 1995 racing video game developed by Genki and published by Sega for the Sega Saturn. It is the latest game in the Hang-On series.

== Gameplay ==
Hang-On GP is a three-dimensional motorcycle racing game featuring ten selectable motorcycles, each with differing characteristics in braking, engine performance, frame and grip. Players can race from three camera perspectives, including a first-person view from the motorcycle and two third-person viewpoints. The game also supports the Sega Saturn Racing Controller peripheral.

The game features six fictional racing courses, comprising three initial tracks—Albatross Cliff Reef, Great Crimson Wall and New Dwells—and three additional variations unlocked through successful race finishes. Gameplay modes include Time Trial and GP Race, with players able to perform power slides while cornering. The handling options also allow players to choose between different riding characteristics.

Additional content includes an unlockable Endurance Mode, in which players attempt to complete as many laps as possible within a ten-minute period, and mirrored versions of the courses.

== Development and release ==
During development, Sega promoted Hang-On GP '95 as a polygon-based revival of the Hang-On series for the Sega Saturn. Pre-release coverage in September 1995 highlighted the game's three camera perspectives, motorcycle handling and support for the Saturn Racing Controller.

The game was released in Japan on October 27, 1995, at a retail price of ¥5,800. It was subsequently released as Hang-On GP in North America and Hang-On GP '96 in Europe.

== Reception ==
Next Generation gave it three stars out of five, and said that "Hang On GP '95 is a better than average racer, but the title lacks the inspired nature of a great game".

Edge gave it a 6/10, and said that "Hang On shows all the signs of a promising concept fobbed off to a B or C development team where poor programming and lack lustre design result in a game that has little new to offer".

== See also ==
- Super Hang-On
