= OutRun 3-D =

1989 video game

Out Run 3-D
- Developer: Sega
- Publisher: Sega
- Series: OutRun
- Platform: Master System
- Release: EU: June 1989
- Genre: Racing
- Mode: Single-player

Out Run 3-D is the second of four OutRun racing games developed for the Master System. It was released in 1989. Although based on the original and similar in design, it is a separate game and not a three-dimensional version of the original Out Run.

The game was one of eight Master System titles developed for use with Sega's stereoscopic 3-D glasses, but it also features a standard 2-D mode which may be accessed by pressing the Pause button when the title screen appears.

== Gameplay ==
The driver interface and controls in OutRun 3-D are largely the same as those of its predecessor, with a two-speed manual gearbox and a top speed of 293 km/h.

The overall road network is also arranged in the same fashion as the first Master System Out Run game. Starting from the same tropical landscape (named Coconut Beach), on each trip the player is likewise presented sequentially with four junctions - each with a choice of two turns - with the goal of ending at one of five destinations before the timer runs out.

The landscapes, however, differ in varying degrees to the original, and the shapes of the roads are unique. Also unlike the original title, OutRun 3-D allows the player to choose between three difficulty settings - Beginner, Average and Expert - which changes the weather as well as the road layout of each leg of the journey.

Graphically the game resembles its predecessor and, like the original, features a red Ferrari Testarossa Spider, but most of the sprites were re-drawn and a variety of new visual elements were included, such as a long tunnel, roadside shorelines and certain weather effects, as well as an exhaust backfire animation on the player's vehicle.

=== Music ===
OutRun 3-D has four selectable tracks, including a remixed version of "Magical Sound Shower" from the original Out Run, as well as "Midnight Highway", "Colour Ocean" and "Shining Wind", written by Chikako Kamatani. A new version of the original's "Last Wave" is also introduced at the score screen.

== Reception ==
Computer and Video Games magazine rated the game 81% in 1989.

Mean Machines Sega magazine awarded OutRun 3-D an overall score of 81%. While pointing out that the game was not as smooth as the first Master System Out Run title, the MMS team described it as being perhaps the best stereoscopic 3-D game on the market.

== Port ==
The game was later ported to Nintendo 3DS by M2 and released as a part of Sega 3D Reprint Archives on 18 December 2014.
