= OutRun 2006: Coast 2 Coast =

2006 video game

- North American cover art featuring the 2006 Ferrari Superamerica
- Developer: Sumo Digital
- Publisher: Sega
- Directors: Paul Porter; Darren Mills
- Producers: Mark Glossop; Steve Lycett
- Designer: Travis Ryan
- Composers: Hiroshi Kawaguchi; Fumio Ito; Richard Jacques
- Series: OutRun
- Platforms: PlayStation 2, PlayStation Portable, Windows, Xbox
- Release: PlayStation Portable, PlayStation 2, Xbox: EU: March 31, 2006; AU: April 6, 2006; NA: April 25, 2006; Windows: EU: June 23, 2006; NA: June 27, 2006
- Genre: Racing
- Modes: Single-player, multiplayer

OutRun 2006: Coast 2 Coast, released as OutRun 2 SP in Japan, is a 2006 racing video game developed by Sumo Digital and published by Sega for home consoles. The game is an updated combination of Outrun 2 and Outrun 2 SP that includes all stages from previous versions of Outrun 2, plus challenges and local and internet multiplayer.

It is the ninth release in the OutRun series. The game received generally favorable reviews.

== Release history ==
The game was released for Xbox, PlayStation 2 and PlayStation Portable initially, with a Windows release following later. The Japanese release was titled OutRun 2 SP (not to be confused with the older arcade iteration of the same name) and was only released for PlayStation 2.

Each version includes system-specific features, including a link-up feature between the PS2 and PSP versions, a different mission set for the PSP, and Xbox Live support on the Xbox.

== Gameplay ==
Gameplay screenshot of the Ferrari F50 Spider in a race (Windows version)

Gameplay is similar to previous versions of OutRun 2. Cars have varying classes ranging from Novice to Professional, with increased top speeds and diminished handling as the difficulty rises. New to the OutRun series is the addition of a separate "OutRun" class of car, which allows each car to have increased performance in all aspects, and which adds cosmetic changes such as racing stripes, decals, and renovated bodywork.

Coast 2 Coast features 15 different cars, the most of any OutRun game. In addition to the ten vehicles from OutRun 2 SP, new models include the 550 Barchetta, F355 Spider, Superamerica, 328 GTS and the Ferrari F430. Some models, music tracks and variations of starting courses cannot be unlocked on the PlayStation Portable or PlayStation 2 without the use of the cross-system connectivity feature inherent of the two systems (as a result of PSP connectivity being removed from the Japanese PS2 version, all PSP unlockables are included in the Japanese PS2 version from the start) or cheat codes.

=== Modes ===
"Coast 2 Coast" mode is the game's "career" mode, in which there are many challenges (labeled as "missions") to complete, which can include racing rivals for the top position, thrilling the player's passenger by completing their requests for certain driving maneuvers, or tests of memory and logic. The racing modes from OutRun 2 SP ("OutRun", "Heart Attack" and "Time Attack") return, while four extra modes exclusive to the "Coast 2 Coast" mode are added:

- Test Your Drift: A one-on-one race with the objective of accumulating points by drifting through bends.
- Test Your Slipstream: The player must drive behind traffic vehicles to collect the points and beat rivals.
- Avoid the Knockout: An elimination race where the last-placed car at the end of each stage is eliminated from the challenge.
- Don't Lose Your Girlfriend: Another one-on-one duel in which the player must stay ahead of the rival couple until their "heart points" reach 0.

=== Unlocks ===
When the game is started for the first time, a limited selection of cars, tracks, challenges and background music is available. Each individual element can be unlocked through the exchange of "OutRun Miles", which are points that players earn for progression through the game, though any given mission or race does not need to be finished to earn OutRun Miles. Some unlockables are missing in Coast 2 Coast compared to the earlier home version of OutRun 2, namely the original OutRun from 1986 and the bonus tracks from Daytona USA 2 and Scud Race.

=== Online modes ===
The game featured an online mode for up to six players. The online service for the PC, PS2 and PSP versions of the game was discontinued in May 2009. The Xbox Live servers went offline on April 15, 2010 due to the discontinuation of Xbox Live for Xbox. The Xbox version remains playable online through the Insignia unofficial replacement Xbox Live service.

== Reception ==
Reception

Aggregate scores
Aggregator	Score			
Aggregator	PC	PS2	PSP	Xbox
GameRankings	83.10%	80.03%	82.59%	77.21%
Metacritic	81/100	81/100	82/100	77/100

Review scores
Publication	Score			
Publication	PC	PS2	PSP	Xbox
Edge	N/A	N/A	8/10	N/A
Electronic Gaming Monthly	N/A	6.33/10	N/A	6.33/10
Eurogamer	9/10	9/10	9/10	9/10
Game Informer	N/A	7.5/10	7.5/10	7.5/10
GamePro	N/A	N/A	N/A	3.5/5
GameSpot	N/A	8/10	8/10	7.9/10
GameSpy	N/A	4/5	4/5	N/A
GameTrailers	7/10	7/10	7/10	7/10
IGN	N/A	7.3/10	7.3/10	7.3/10
Official U.S. PlayStation Magazine	N/A	2.5/5	3/5	N/A
Official Xbox Magazine (US)	N/A	N/A	N/A	6.5/10
PC Gamer (UK)	88%	N/A	N/A	N/A
The Sydney Morning Herald	N/A	4/5	4/5	4/5

OutRun 2006: Coast 2 Coast was met with positive reception. It has a score of 83% and 81 out of 100 for the PC version, 83% and 82 out of 100 for the PSP version, 80% and 81 out of 100 for the PlayStation 2 version, and 77% and 77 out of 100 for the Xbox version according to GameRankings and Metacritic.

In 2014, Edge ranked the game at #71 on its list of "The 100 Best Games to Play Today", stating that "sun-seekers and joyriders call it home, its crystal lakes and epic drifts an escape from war-torn deserts and space marines". In a 2017 special edition of the same magazine, listing their 100 top videogames of all time, OutRun 2006 was one of only two racing games on the list, along with Trials Fusion.
