= Tetris Giant =

2009 video game

- Flyer for Tetris Giant
- Developer: Sega
- Publisher: Sega
- Series: Tetris
- Platform: Arcade
- Genre: Puzzle
- Modes: Single-player, multiplayer
- Arcade system: Sega System SP

Tetris Giant, known as Tetris Dekaris (Japanese: テトリス・デカリス, Hepburn: Tetorisu Dekarisu) in Japan, is an arcade game released in Japan in 2009 by Sega that features a giant version of the game Tetris. It is played on a large 70" DLP Projection Monitor, running on Sega System SP. It is controlled using giant joysticks, the right joystick being slightly lower than the left one, with a built-in shaker "rumble" motor, a device that Sega refers to as "Deka Lever" (deka is Japanese for large). The playing field is 6 cells wide by 7 cells high as opposed to almost universal 10 cells wide by 20 high. The game can be played with up to two players.

This game is a one or two-player game with competitive and cooperative modes available. Single Mode includes Line Challenge and Score Challenge modes, and Co-op Mode includes the same modes. During competitive multiplayer, clearing multiple block rows makes the other player's speed increase. During two player cooperative play, players can swap pieces with each other by tapping a button on the main arcade cabinet, up to three times. As in a normal game of Tetris, you move your pieces left and right by moving the stick left and right, and push down on the stick to make the pieces fall into place. Buttons on the top of the joystick can be pressed to rotate your pieces around.

Unique to this game, the Tetris Dekaris/Giant base unit is actually a projector which can optionally be detached from the default screen and projected onto a large wall. Arcade operators are able to disconnect the game from its default monitor and project the gameplay onto a large wall.

== Gameplay ==
=== Line Challenge ===
Line challenge is a time-limited mode aimed at beginners of the game. In it, the player must clear as many lines as possible before the time runs out. Under default settings the timer starts at 120 seconds, though this can be changed in the operator settings. Clearing two or more lines at once adds bonus time to the timer (2 sec. for Doubles, 5 sec. for Triples, and 20 sec. for Tetrises). If a player would top out, either by placing a block entirely above the line over the 7th row or by having piece entry blocked, the bottom seven rows will be cleared and the player will be allowed to continue playing (however 5 seconds will be deducted from the timer). The game ends when either the time limit expires or the 200-line limit is reached.

=== Score Challenge ===
Score challenge is a score attack mode aimed toward those more familiar with the game. The objective is to get the highest score possible before topping out or reaching the 200-line limit. The scoring system in this game is significantly different than Guideline scoring and puts a high emphasis on clearing Tetrises. The level advances every 10 lines and caps at Level 15, ending the game. The score cap is 99,999 points. The game keeps track of the 1000 highest scores registered on the machine and displays them on the attract screen and in game. During gameplay, the leaderboard is seen to the side of the playfield, climbing higher as the player’s score places higher on the leaderboard. Extra emphasis is put on scores on positions of a multiple of 100 (1000th, 900th, etc.) and on the top 10 scores.
