= Scud Race =

1996 video game

- European arcade flyer
- Developer: Sega-AM2
- Publisher: Sega
- Director: Toshihiro Nagoshi
- Producer: Toshihiro Nagoshi
- Designer: Yasuo Kawagoshi
- Composers: Hideaki Miyamoto; Kaoru Ohori; Fumio Ito
- Platform: Arcade
- Release: 1996
- Genre: Racing game
- Modes: Single player, multiplayer
- Arcade system: Sega Model 3

Scud Race, (Note: or SCUD Race, an acronym of "Sport Car Ultimate Drive") known as Sega Super GT in North America, is an arcade racing video game released by Sega in 1996. It is the first racing game to use the Sega Model 3 hardware.

== Gameplay ==
Scud Race came in either Twin or Deluxe cabinets, which can be linked together for up to eight players. The game was modelled after the BPR Global GT Series, featuring the cars of four prominent teams during the 1996 season. The game features four different courses of varying difficulty, though two are beginner level (daytime and nighttime).

Arcade operators could configure races in Normal (Sprint), Grand Prix or Endurance modes, with each setting increasing the number of laps.

The four original courses were later included as an unlockable bonus in the Xbox version of OutRun 2 (2004), combined into a continuous route rather than separate lap-based circuits.

== Development ==
After the success of Daytona USA, fans wanted a sequel. Director Toshihiro Nagoshi recounted, "The development team is the same, and so many believed that we would automatically be doing the sequel to Daytona. We wanted to change the team in order to ensure a different kind of game, but we never did. In the end, we need not have worried, because we've succeeded in producing something with a completely different look." During development, the game was previewed under the provisional title Super Car Race before receiving its final name, Scud Race, in December 1996. Toshihiro Nagoshi explained that the team wanted to create a racing game centred on recognisable supercars rather than simply producing another Daytona title. The most notable similarities include the HUD display with most features in the same positions on screen, and the handling style of the game. The main difference between gameplay is the addition of acceleration while drifting, which caused a radically different drifting strategy. AM2 head Yu Suzuki, though not part of the Scud Race development team, gave advice on how to do the drift handling and the sound sampling. The cabinet design was by Sega AM4.

Scud Race was originally planned to be the first game to be released for the Model 3 arcade board, but marketing considerations led Sega to push it back to follow Virtua Fighter 3. During the test phase, key members of the development team raced the four cars depicted in the game in real life. For the game's sound production, members of Sega AM2 visited Fuji Speedway to record the engines of actual supercars. The team captured audio directly from the vehicles and recorded their sounds as they drove around the circuit, seeking to reproduce the distinctive engine and exhaust noises in the arcade game. The game made its European debut on January 21, 1997, at the Amusement Trades Exhibition International show in London.

The arcade cabinet incorporated a motion system known as the Direct Rolling Motorized System (D.R.M.S), designed to simulate the movement of a racing vehicle. The game's twin cabinet was subsequently promoted for the February 1997 AOU Show. Contemporary coverage described revisions to the cabinet's movement, the number of participating vehicles, and the presentation of the game's four selectable cars.

In a March 1997 interview with Spanish magazine Hobby Consolas, Toshihiro Nagoshi stated that the development team consisted of approximately 16 people, with roughly equal numbers of designers and programmers. He also recalled visiting Ferrari's factory in Modena to negotiate the use of its cars, eventually pursuing alternative means of obtaining approval when the initial discussions did not proceed as expected.

In April 1997, Sega Magazin reported that a Saturn version of Scud Race was planned for December 1997. The magazine stated that it was expected to use a proposed 64-bit upgrade cartridge for the Saturn, which was also being associated with a planned conversion of Virtua Fighter 3. It contrasted this with Sega Touring Car Championship, which was expected to run on an unmodified Saturn.

In Brazil, Scud Race, marketed as Sega Super GT, was tested at Magic Games in Shopping Center D, São Paulo. In July 1997, Brazilian magazine Ação Games reported that its reviewer had played the first cabinet installed for testing in the country. The machine initially supported two linked players, with the possibility of connecting up to eight players. The magazine also noted that the game featured four circuits and car models composed of approximately 3,000 polygons, compared with the approximately 1,000 polygons used for cars in Daytona USA.

== Release ==
Scud Race had a location test in early 1997 at the Sega City arcade in Irvine, California, before being released throughout North America. The game was released as Super GT in North America because in the U.S. the word "scud" evoked memories of the Scud missiles used by Iraqi forces in the then-recent Gulf War.

A Dreamcast conversion was reported as a prospective launch title in the late 1990s. A technical demonstration running on Dreamcast hardware was shown privately at Sega's New Challenge Conference in May 1998. However, director Toshihiro Nagoshi later clarified that the demonstration was not part of a full conversion project, and no home version was released.

=== Scud Race Plus ===
Sega released Scud Race Plus as an update to the game in 1997. This version allowed players to play any of the four courses in reverse. Scud Race Plus also included the bizarre "Super-Beginner" course, an oval track inside a giant-scale children's playhouse. This featured a rocking horse and bowling pins which the player could hit. Exclusive to this course, players could press Start at the car select screen to race as a cat, a tank, an "AM2 crew" bus or a tin racing car. The game also included an attract sequence depicting a red sports car driving through Rome and crashing through the Colosseum, originally featured in a promotional animation for the Virtua Fighter series.

Scud Race Plus was released exclusively in Japan, although changing the software's region setting to the United States displayed the title Sega Super GT Plus.

== Reception ==
In Japan, Game Machine listed Scud Race on their March 1, 1997 issue as being the second most-successful dedicated arcade game of the month.

The game received positive reviews. The game was reviewed by Hyper magazine and rated 5 out of 5 stars. Next Generation rated it four stars out of five, and stated that "Sega's newest Model 3 creation is the most gorgeous driving game ever to grace an arcade. Simply put, Sega Super GT is a visual masterpiece, boasting never-before-seen graphics and providing realistic driving speeds gamers simply have never ever experienced (unless, of course, they're Mario Andretti)".

Brazilian magazine Ação Games awarded Sega Super GT a score of 9 out of 10 in July 1997, praising its animated graphics, realistic handling and detailed environments. Reviewer Ivan Cordon considered the game a strong successor to Daytona USA, while observing that Sega Rally Championship had failed to achieve the expected impact in Brazilian arcades.
