= Out Run Europa =

1991 video game

- Developer: Probe Software
- Publisher: U.S. Gold
- Composers: Matt Furniss (Amiga, Atari ST); Jeroen Tel (C64)
- Series: Out Run
- Platforms: Amiga, Amstrad CPC, Atari ST, Commodore 64, Game Gear, Master System, ZX Spectrum
- Release: EU: 1991; Game Gear/Master System: NA/EU: 1992
- Genre: Racing
- Mode: Single-player

Out Run Europa is a racing video game developed by Probe Software and published by U.S. Gold for the Amiga, Amstrad CPC, Atari ST, Commodore 64, Game Gear, Master System, and ZX Spectrum in 1991. Only the Game Gear version was released in North America. It is a spin-off of Sega's 1986 arcade game Out Run.

Levels in Out Run Europa are set across Europe, with the player passing road signs for places like Paris and Berlin. The player must escape from the police using a variety of vehicles, from the standard sports cars from Ferrari and Porsche to motorbikes and jet skis.

== Synopsis ==
The player's car has been stolen. Taking an abandoned motorcycle, the player chases the thieves throughout Europe.

== Development ==
Out Run Europa's development was first announced in 1988 and the game's release was delayed until 1991.

== Reception ==
The Spectrum version was well received, with Your Sinclair awarding the game 83%, and praising the big sprites and smooth animation when compared to the original game.

Console XS reviewed the Sega Master System version, giving it a 90% score.
