= Power Drift =

1988 video game

- Japanese arcade flyer
- Developers: Sega AM2 (arcade); Activision (home computers); Copya Systems (PCE)
- Publishers: WW: Sega (arcade); EU: Activision (computers); JP: Asmik Ace (PCE)
- Director: Yu Suzuki
- Producer: Yu Suzuki
- Designer: Yu Suzuki
- Composer: Hiroshi Kawaguchi
- Platforms: Arcade, Amiga, Amstrad CPC, Atari ST, Commodore 64, Dreamcast, MS-DOS, MSX, PC Engine, Saturn, ZX Spectrum, Nintendo 3DS
- Release: August 5, 1988: Arcade; JP: August 5, 1988; NA: August 1988; EU: September 1988 Amiga, C64, CPC, DOS, MSX, ST, ZX; EU: 1989 PC Engine; JP: April 13, 1990 Saturn; JP: February 26, 1998
- Genre: Kart racing
- Mode: Single-player
- Arcade system: Sega Y Board

Power Drift (パワードリフト, Pawā Dorifuto) is a kart racing game released in arcades by Sega in 1988. More technologically advanced than Sega's earlier 2.5D racing games, like Hang-On (1985) and Out Run (1986), in Power Drift the entire world and track consist of sprites. The upgraded hardware of the Sega Y Board allows individual sprites and the background to be rotated—even while being scaled—making the visuals more dynamic.

Designed and directed by Yu Suzuki, the game was a critical and commercial success upon release in arcades. It was subsequently ported to various home computers in Europe by Activision in 1989, followed by a PC Engine port published in Japan by Asmik Ace in 1990. It was not released on Sega consoles until the Sega Ages release for the Sega Saturn in 1998.

== Gameplay ==
Arcade screenshot

The objective is to finish each race in third place or better in order to advance to the next stage. Players have the option of continuing if they finish the race in fourth place or lower before the game is over, but the player's score will not increase upon continuing the game.

The tracks have a roller coaster feel to them, with many steep climbs and falls, as well as the ability to "fall" off higher levels. To add to this feeling, the sit-down cabinet was built atop a raised hydraulic platform, and the machine would tilt and shake quite violently. Each circuit, labeled from "A" to "E" has a certain theme to it (for example, circuit A has cities, circuit B has deserts, circuit C has beaches, etc.) in a series of five tracks. There are also four laps for each course.

All the tracks on each course have names as well. Course A is Springfield Ovalshape, Foofy Hilltop, Snowhill Drive, Octopus Oval and Curry De Parl. Course B is Swingshot City, Phantom Riverbend, Octangular Ovalshape, Charlotte Beach and Highland Spheres. Course C is Bum Beach, Jason Bendyline, Nighthawk City, Zanussi Island and Wasteman Freefall. Course D is Mexico Colours, Oxygen Desert, Jamie Road, Monaco Da Farce and Blow Hairpin. Course E is Aisthorpe Springrose Valley, Patterson Nightcity, Lydia Rightaway, Bungalow Ridgeway and Karen Longway.

If players place first on all five tracks (which is indicated by all five gold trophies on the number of wins display behind the course letter), an "Extra Stage" is unlocked, where the assigned car is a vehicle from other Sega games. Courses A, C and E allow players to race with the F-14 Tomcat fighter jet from After Burner II in the Extra Stage, while courses B and D have an option to race the motorcycle from Super Hang-On. Players also can press the start button while in a race to see a rear view.

== Ports ==
Power Drift was ported to the Amstrad CPC, Commodore 64, MSX, Amiga, Atari ST, MS-DOS and ZX Spectrum home computers by Activision and released in 1989. The home computer ports lack the tilting action seen in the original arcade version. A PC Engine version was developed by Copya Systems and published exclusively in Japan by Asmik Ace Entertainment on April 13, 1990.

A Sega Mega Drive version was planned but never released. A 32X port was in development by Sega, but not published. Dempa was working on a Sega CD conversion that also did not reach store shelves.

Sega ported Power Drift to the Sega Saturn as part of the Sega Ages brand, releasing it in Japan only on February 26, 1998. It was also included on Yu Suzuki Game Works Vol. 1 for the Dreamcast on December 1, 2001.

Power Drift was re-released with stereoscopic 3D support as part of the Nintendo 3DS collection Sega 3D Reprint Archives, which was released on April 26, 2016. The game also received a standalone release for the system on November 2, 2015, under the name 3D Power Drift, which adds unlockable characters and music from other Sega franchises.

== Reception ==
Reception

Award
Publication	Award
Amstrad Action	Mastergame

In Japan, Game Machine listed Power Drift on their 1988 issue as being the second most-successful upright arcade unit of the month. It went on to be the fourth highest-grossing arcade game of 1989 in Japan. The ZX Spectrum port knocked the long-standing RoboCop from the top of the UK sales charts in 1989.

The arcade game received positive reviews from critics upon release in 1988. Sinclair User magazine rated it 10 out of 10, comparing it favorably with Sega's earlier arcade hit Out Run (1986) and stating it was technically "a breakthrough", while praising the "breathtaking" graphics and "heartstopping" gameplay. Andy Smith of Advanced Computer Entertainment said it was an "exciting" and "thrilling high speed" racing game in "a futuristic car cum-Go-Kart" that "combines all that was best" in Out Run and Buggy Boy (1985) to come up "with a terrific driving game that looks set to be a winner".

GameFan magazine reviewed the PC Engine version, scoring it 172 out of 200.

Sinclair User gave the arcade version of Power Drift the "Racing Game of 1988" award. They said it was, "without doubt, the single most spectacular game ever to arrive in an arcade". They explained, "the blinding speed of the game and the astonishing way that the track zooms up and down, side to side as you participate in the race of a lifetime can be described in no lesser term than fab".

Guinness World Records gave Power Drift the award for "First kart racing videogame" as it predated Super Mario Kart (1992).
