= Fantasy Zone =

1986 video game

- Japanese arcade flyer
- Developer: Sega R&D1 (Note: Master System version developed by Sega R&D2; MSX version developed by Pony Inc.; Famicom version developed by Sunsoft; NES version developed by Pixel; TurboGrafx-16 version developed by Bits Laboratory; X68000 version developed by Dempa Shimbunsha; Saturn version developed by Rutobo Games.)
- Publishers: Sega: MSX Pony Inc. NES; JP: Sunsoft; NA: Tengen TurboGrafx-16; JP: NEC Avenue; NA: NEC X68000 Dempa Saturn 3D-Ages
- Designer: Yoji Ishii
- Programmer: Shuichi Katagi
- Artist: Masaki Kondo
- Composer: Hiroshi Kawaguchi
- Series: Fantasy Zone
- Platforms: Arcade, Master System, MSX, NES, TurboGrafx-16, X68000, Sega Saturn
- Release: March 28, 1986: Arcade; JP: March 28, 1986; Master System; JP: June 15, 1986; NA: September 1986; PAL: August 1987 MSX; JP: March 21, 1987; NES; JP: July 20, 1987; NA: April 1990; TurboGrafx-16; JP: October 14, 1988; NA: November 1989; X68000; JP: August 4, 1989; Saturn; JP: February 21, 1997
- Genre: Scrolling shooter
- Mode: Single-player
- Arcade system: Sega System 16A

Fantasy Zone (Note: Japanese: ファンタジーゾーン, Hepburn: Fantajī Zōn) is a 1986 horizontally scrolling shooter video game developed and published by Sega for arcades. It is the first game in the Fantasy Zone series, and was later ported to several home consoles, including Sega's Master System. The player controls a sentient spaceship named Opa-Opa who fights an enemy invasion in the titular group of planets. The game contains a number of features atypical of the traditional scrolling shooter. The main character, Opa-Opa, is sometimes referred to as Sega's first mascot character.

The game's design and main character have similarities to Konami's TwinBee, and both games are credited with establishing the cute 'em up subgenre. Fantasy Zone also popularized the concept of a boss rush, a stage where the player faces multiple previous bosses again in succession. The game was followed by several sequels, beginning with Fantasy Zone II: The Tears of Opa-Opa in 1987.

== Gameplay ==
Arcade screenshot

In the game, the player's ship is placed in a level with a number of bases to destroy. When all the bases are gone, the stage boss appears, who must be defeated in order to move on to the next stage. There are eight stages, and in all of them, except the final one, the scrolling camera is not fixed; the player can move either left or right, although the stage loops. The final level consists of a rematch against all of the previous bosses in succession before facing the final boss.

Opa-Opa uses two different attacks: the standard weapon (initially bullets) and bombs. He can also move down to land on the ground by sprouting feet and walking around until he flies again.

It is possible to upgrade Opa-Opa's weapons, get bombs and flying engine to increase speed, and get extra lives. To do these, the player must get money by defeating enemies, bases or bosses, and access a shop by touching a marked balloon. Prices rise with each purchase. When the player chooses to exit or the time runs up, another screen appears to equip these upgrades; only one engine, weapon and bomb can be equipped at a time.

Some of the purchasable weapons have a time limit that starts as soon as the shop is left. Some of the bombs can be used at any moment, but are limited in quantity. Engine upgrades are permanent. The powerups can also be reassigned by reentering the shop or touch a balloon with the word "Select" written on it. If the player loses a life, all of the upgrades are lost.

== Ports and re-releases ==
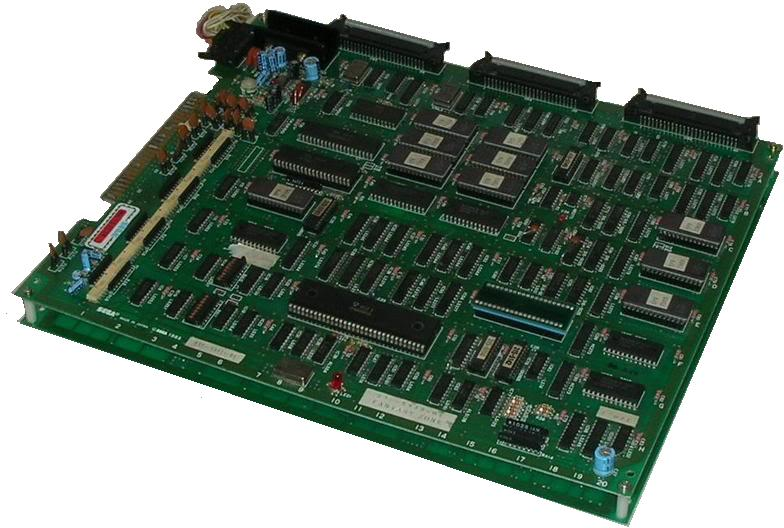
Fantasy Zone arcade board

Fantasy Zone was ported to the Master System, MSX, Famicom/Nintendo Entertainment System, X68000, and PC Engine—all with similar gameplay, though with some notable differences. For example, the Master System version lacks some features such as the radar that indicates the location of the bases or a gauge that indicates energy level, and two of the bosses were replaced by alternate bosses.

Two different versions were released for the Famicom and NES. The Japanese version was released in 1987, developed and published by Sunsoft. The American version was released in 1990, developed by Pixel and published by Tengen. In 1997, Fantasy Zone was released in the Sega Ages series in Japan for the Sega Saturn.

Fantasy Zone was re-released as an enhanced remake for the PlayStation 2, again in the Sega Ages series. Although similar in appearance to the arcade version (even incorporating the original arcade sounds), this version uses polygons instead of sprites and adds some stages, including bonus levels with the viewpoint behind Opa-Opa as he tries to collect coins from any boss that was defeated at the moment; this game mode is very similar to Space Harrier, or the unreleased Space Fantasy Zone. This version was released in North America and Europe as part of the Sega Classics Collection.

Due to hardware limitations, this version was divided in three different parts. The Master System version was re-released in Japan for the Virtual Console on March 11, 2008, for Europe and Australia on April 11, and in North America on April 14.

On September 18, the final Sega Ages disc was devoted to the series, Fantasy Zone Complete Collection. Instead of a 3D remake, it compiles all of the games in the series, including spin-offs, all of Sega's own versions, and a remake of Fantasy Zone II for System 16 hardware.

The original arcade version is unlockable in Sonic's Ultimate Genesis Collection. A 3D port of the game was released on March 19, 2014 for the Nintendo 3DS titled 3D Fantasy Zone: Opa-Opa Bros. New features of the 3DS port involve stereoscopic 3D visuals, adjustable difficulty settings, the ability to save the game, the ability to switch to the Japanese versions and US versions of the game, a Stage Select feature, and a new mode which involves the player playing as Upa-Upa, Opa-Opa's brother. The two replacement bosses from the Master System release can be unveiled, each replacing the standard boss.

The arcade version is a minigame in several entries in the Yakuza series, beginning with Yakuza 0. It is identical to the original arcade release, except the addition of a rapid fire button.

A Sega Genesis port of the game was developed for the Sega Genesis Mini 2, the successor to the Sega Genesis Mini microconsole, which was released on October 27, 2022. The port added a Super Easy mode.

== Reception ==
Fantasy Zone was very successful in Japanese arcades, helping to give rise to the popular System 16 arcade board. In April 1986, it was the second top-grossing table arcade cabinet of the month in Japan. It was the top-grossing arcade game in Japan from July–August 1986.

The Sega Master System version was reviewed in 1988 in Dragon, given 4 out of 5 stars. In 1988, it got four categories of 9/10 each from Computer and Video Games, calling it "a beaut of a game [where] I-want-to-eat-this-cartridge scrolling backdrop and aliens float in from all sides spitting death at you". In 1989, Computer and Video Games rated the PC Engine version 88% and the Master System version 87%, considering the PC Engine version to be better than the Master System version but not as commercially successful. Console XS reviewed the Master System version in 1992, giving it a 91% score.

It was reviewed by Génération 4, Sega Power, Happy Computer, and Tilt in 1987 and 1990.

== Sequels ==
- Fantasy Zone II: The Tears of Opa-Opa (1987)
- Opa Opa (released internationally as Fantasy Zone: The Maze) (1987)
- Galactic Protector (1988)
- Space Fantasy Zone (1990, unreleased)
- Fantasy Zone Gear: The Adventures of Opa-Opa Jr. (released internationally simply as Fantasy Zone) (1991)
- Super Fantasy Zone (1992)
- Fantasy Zone (Redemption Game) (1999)
- Medal de Fantasy Zone (2012)
