= OutRun 2 =

2003 video game

- Arcade flyer featuring the Ferrari F50 Spider
- Developer: Sega AM2 (Note: Ported to Xbox by Sumo Digital.)
- Publisher: Sega (Note: Microsoft Game Studios published the Xbox version in North America.)
- Directors: Makoto Osaki; Daichi Katagiri
- Producer: Yu Suzuki
- Designer: Shin Ishikawa
- Programmer: Takuji Masuda
- Artist: Yasuo Kawagoshi
- Composers: Keisuke Tsukahara; Fumio Ito
- Series: OutRun
- Platforms: Arcade, Xbox
- Release: Arcade: JP: December 1, 2003; EU: December 13, 2003; NA: December 18, 2003; Xbox: EU: October 1, 2004; AU: October 15, 2004; NA: October 25, 2004; JP: January 25, 2005
- Genre: Racing
- Modes: Single-player, multiplayer
- Arcade system: Sega Chihiro, Sega Lindbergh (SP DX)

OutRun 2 (アウトラン2) is a 2003 racing game developed by Sega AM2 for arcades. It was the first OutRun game since OutRunners (1993), and the fourth arcade game. As with previous games, the player uses a Ferrari sports car in various races and challenges.

OutRun 2 was released for the Sega Chihiro arcade hardware, and was ported to the Xbox home console in 2004. It received generally favorable reviews. Updated versions, subtitled SP and SP/DX, were released. It was followed by OutRun 2006: Coast 2 Coast, which retained most of its predecessor's content alongside new features.

== Gameplay ==
Gameplay screenshot of a Ferrari Enzo in a race

OutRun 2 maintains the race format from the 1986 original, in which the player is behind the steering wheel of a Ferrari sports car with a friend in the passenger seat through 5 of 15 stages. As before, the player can choose their course and the soundtrack. OutRun 2 has 3D graphics and a local networked multiplayer system.

Sega licensed seven Ferrari vehicles for OutRun 2, including the Testarossa from the original game.

The soundtrack is a rearranged and re-recorded version of the musical themes from the 1986 game, and includes seven pieces ranging in style from instrumental rock to upbeat ballads. The original 1986 music is also unlockable.

OutRun 2 contains three single-player game modes::

- OutRun Race – the player drives through 5 of 15 stages, selecting the next course via forks in the road. A timer continually ticks down and is extended when the player passes through occasional checkpoints. If the time limit reaches zero, meaning the player has raced too slowly between checkpoints, the game is over.
- Heart Attack Mode – the player drives with the same course and time structure as in OutRun Race, but the passenger will frequently request certain stunts and actions. These requests, carried out through marked sections of the course, can include passing traffic cars, drifting around bends, driving through marked lanes, knocking over cones, and simply not crashing into anything for as long as possible. If the player succeeds, they will receive heart points and, at the end of the request section, will receive a grade based on their performance. At the end of the stage, the player will receive an average grade based on performance during previous stunts. Crashing into the scenery or driving off-road at any time will result in the player losing hearts. If the player reaches a course goal with a satisfying grade and within the time limit, they will receive a more romantic ending.
- Time Attack Mode – the player races a competing 'ghost' car through a specific course to the time limit. Time checks are presented to the player at various points on each stage.

All unlockable bonus secret tracks are from Scud Race and Daytona USA 2 on the Xbox version.

== Development ==
Developing the game precipitated some changes for its developers, Sega AM2, who had historically written their games using Unix systems. Writing for an Xbox-based system meant they had to adapt to the Microsoft Windows kernel.

== Release history, ports, and updates ==
Outrun 2 was released in a number of ports and updates with added (or in some cases removed) features

=== OutRun 2 SP ===
This sub-section refers to the arcade release, not to be confused with the later Japanese home port titled 'Outrun 2 SP' which was equivalent to Outrun 2006: Coast to Coast (see below).

In 2004, Sega released an arcade upgrade to the OutRun 2, OutRun 2 SP. It includes 15 new courses which are mostly based around a New World theme including several Americanesque landscapes and regions.

=== OutRun 2 SP DX/SDX ===
An updated version, OutRun 2 SP SDX, was shown at a privately held Sega show on July 7, 2006. It does not run on the Sega Chihiro, but rather the Sega Lindbergh. This iteration is displayed at a resolution of 800*480 rather than the previous versions' 640*480 and features cooperative play involving both players sitting next to each other in replica Ferraris, taking turns driving the same car with their own set of controls. The 2-player cabinet is designated as DX (Deluxe), and the 4-Player cabinet is designated as SDX (Super Deluxe), with raceview cameras on the players, and a live leaderboard over the center units.

=== Xbox version ===
In 2004, OutRun 2 was released on the Xbox. Development was shared by Sega AM2 and the UK developers Sumo Digital. The game was released in Europe on October 1, followed by the U.S. release on October 25. Sega published the game in Europe and Japan, while Microsoft Game Studios published it in North America.

The Xbox version preserves the look and feel of the arcade original, but with the additions of 480p anamorphic widescreen support and tweaks to make it more suitable for home play. The game includes a straight port of the arcade, "Outrun Arcade", plus two other modes: OutRun Challenge, which includes 101 missions distributed over the 15 stages, and OutRun Xbox Live, featuring online play. Tracks from Scud Race and Daytona USA 2 can be unlocked as a bonus. Online modes were available via Xbox Live until 15 April 2010. Outrun 2 is playable online via the fan-made replacement Xbox Live server Insignia.

Some content from the arcade game is locked away alongside new, unique content, such as extra cars, extra music tracks, and even the original Out Run game itself. This content is unlocked as the player completes the OutRun Challenge missions. Some slight changes were made to the Arcade mode, such as the 3D model for the newer Testarossa Spider being replaced with a customised Testarossa from 1984. The Japanese version of the game was slightly altered further, fixing some glitches and modifying the bonus stages.

=== Outrun 2006: Coast to Coast ===
Outrun 2006: Coast to Coast is a home console port that includes all the stages of Outrun 2 and Outrun 2 SP in a single product, with some additional features. OutRun 2 SP's new courses, songs and game elements appear alongside the originals and new content. This version was titled Outrun 2 SP in Japan, not to be confused with the earlier arcade game Outrun 2 SP (arcade).

=== Outrun Online Arcade ===
Outrun Online Arcade is a home port for Xbox 360 and Playstation 3 based on the Outrun 2 SP arcade version. It contains only the new tracks (American/New World themed) from that version. It lacks the special unlockables, missions, and challenges from Outrun 2006: Coast to Cost, and lacks the Old World-themed stages from the original Outrun 2, and has slight adjustments to the car inventory.

== Reception ==
Reception

Aggregate score
Aggregator	Score
Metacritic	79/100

Review scores
Publication	Score
Edge	8/10
Electronic Gaming Monthly	6.83/10
Eurogamer	8/10
Game Informer	6.5/10
GameRevolution	B
GameSpot	8.3/10
GameSpy	5/5
GameZone	8.5/10
IGN	8.2/10
Official Xbox Magazine (US)	8.7/10
The Sydney Morning Herald	4/5
The Times	4/5

The Xbox version received "favorable" reviews, according to the review aggregator website Metacritic. The Guardian gave the Xbox port four out of five and described it as "an utterly beguiling game worthy of its legendary name".
