= Turbo OutRun =

1989 video game

- Japanese arcade flyer
- Developers: Sega AM2; Tiertex (Mega Drive)
- Publisher: Sega: EU: U.S. Gold (computers)
- Designer: Satoshi Mifune
- Composers: Arcade; Hiroshi Kawaguchi; Yasuhiro Takagi; C64; Jeroen Tel
- Series: OutRun
- Platforms: Arcade, Atari ST, Commodore 64, Amiga, ZX Spectrum, Amstrad CPC, MS-DOS, FM Towns, Mega Drive
- Release: February 1989: Arcade; JP: February 1989; NA: April 1989; EU/UK: 1989 CPC; EU: 1989 C64; EU: November 1989 ZX Spectrum; EU: 1990 Mega Drive; JP: March 27, 1992; EU: 1992
- Genre: Racing
- Mode: Single-player
- Arcade system: Out Run hardware

Turbo OutRun (ターボアウトラン) is a 1989 racing game developed and published by Sega for arcades. A follow-up to 1986's Out Run, it was released as a dedicated game, as well as an upgrade kit for the original Out Run board. Like its predecessor, Turbo OutRun has players driving a Ferrari, this time a Ferrari F40. Players traverse a set route across the continental United States from New York City to Los Angeles. In addition to a time limit, Turbo OutRun also adds a computer-controlled opponent driving a Porsche 959. The "Turbo" in the title plays a factor as players can press a button to receive a brief turbo boost of speed. Various power-ups which increase the vehicle's attributes can be chosen at various stages of the game.

Ports of Turbo OutRun were released for home computers as well as Sega's own Mega Drive. Computer ports of the game were received with varying degrees of enthusiasm. While the Commodore 64 version received a positive reception, the 16-bit conversions received negative reviews.

== Gameplay ==
The player controls a male driver sitting alongside his girlfriend in a Ferrari F40, racing against the clock and a computer-controlled opponent in a silver Porsche 959 in a race across the United States. The goal is to reach Los Angeles from the starting point of New York City. Unlike the original Out Run, there are no branch roads to choose from. Instead, there is only one path that can be taken to reach the goal.

The player can increase speed by using turbo boost by pressing a button on the side of the console-mounted shifter; the engine temperature will increase in kind on the on-screen gauge. When the gauge reaches "OVERHEAT!", turbo boost cannot be used until the temperature decreases.

Police cars occasionally appear that try to stop the player. They have to either be outrun by using the turbo boost or destroyed by the player by ramming them off-road and into an object on the side of the road.

Turbo OutRun offers the player a choice between automatic transmission or two-speed manual transmission.

At every sub-goal (reached after passing through about four cities), an upgrade can be chosen, the three being: Hi-Power Engine, Special Turbo, and Super Grip Tires. If the CPU opponent reaches the sub-goal before the player, at the next race, the driver's girlfriend will move to the opponent's car. He can still win the girl back if he beats the CPU opponent to the next sub-goal. If the player beats the opponent with the girl in hand, a 1,000,000 point bonus is given. Also, the girl kisses the driver in front of his CPU opponent. If the player reaches the final checkpoint, in the process, the player will pass the CPU opponent and the ending scene is played.

== Music ==
The game's background music plays in a predetermined order, depending on region.

In the 1993 arcade game Daytona USA, a song from Turbo OutRun can be played on the name entry screen by entering the initials TOR. The result is the opening couple of bars of "Rush A Difficulty".

=== Commodore 64 soundtrack ===
The Commodore 64 home version soundtrack, composed and arranged by Jeroen Tel, was well received. The soundtrack won the "Best music on 8-bit computer 1989" award on European Computer Trade Show. The title track is a remix of "Magical Sound Shower" from Out Run, featuring sound samples from Jeroen Tel himself; due to sampling quality, he was actually saying "One, two, tree... hit it, Out Run" while recording, instead of "three", to avoid it sounding like "free".

== Release ==
It was available in a stand-up cabinet, and a sit-down cabinet with decals giving it an appearance of a Ferrari F40, the car featured in the game. There were also conversion kits available to convert original Out Run machines to Turbo OutRun.

== Reception ==
Reception

Review scores
Publication	Score
Crash	79% (Spectrum)
Computer and Video Games	93% (C64)
Sinclair User	78% (Spectrum)
Your Sinclair	70% (Spectrum)
Commodore User	8/10 (Arcade)
Zzap!64	97% (C64)
Mega	53% (Mega Drive)
Mean Machines	42% (Mega Drive)
MegaTech	41% (Mega Drive)
ACE	601/1000 (Amiga/ST)

Award
Publication	Award
Zzap!64	Gold Medal

In Japan, Game Machine listed Turbo OutRun as the third most successful upright/cockpit arcade unit of March 1989. In North America, the arcade game had reached number two on the Play Meter video game charts and number six on the RePlay upright cabinet charts by August 1989.

Turbo OutRun received positive to mixed reviews, depending on the version. The arcade and Commodore 64 versions were well received. Commodore User reviewed the arcade version and scored it 8 out of 10. The C64 version was awarded 93% from C+VG and 97% in Zzap!64. The Spectrum version of the game received 70% from Your Sinclair, 78% from Sinclair User and 79% from Crash.

Mean Machines dismissed the Mega Drive version with an overall rating of 42%. The only aspect of the game to receive genuine praise was the high-scores screen design. The review pointed to "hopeless, mega-jerky 3-D graphics, juddery scrolling, dreadful tunes, naff sound effects, and badly drawn sprites", and concluded it to be a "clapped out Robin Reliant of a race game". Mega placed the Mega Drive version at #3 in their list of the 10 Worst Mega Drive Games of All Time.

== See also ==
- Rad Mobile
