= Hang-On =

1985 video game

- Japanese arcade flyer with the deluxe arcade cabinet pictured at the bottom
- Developer: Sega R&D1
- Publishers: JP/NA: Sega; EU: Sega/Atari Games
- Director: Yu Suzuki
- Designer: Yoji Ishii
- Programmer: Yu Suzuki
- Artist: Hiroshi Hamagaki
- Composer: Hiroshi Kawaguchi
- Platforms: Arcade, Master System, SG-1000, MSX, PC-88
- Release: 2 July 1985: Arcade; JP: 2 July 1985; NA: 22 July 1985; EU: September 1985 Master System; JP: 20 October 1985; NA: September 1986; EU: August 1987 SG-1000; JP: December 1985 MSX, PC-88; JP: 1986
- Genre: Racing
- Mode: Single-player
- Arcade system: Super Scaler (Sega Hang-On hardware)

Hang-On (Note: ハングオン, Hangu On) is a 1985 racing video game developed and published by Sega for arcades. In the game, the player controls a motorcycle against time and other computer-controlled bikes. It was one of the first arcade games to use 16-bit graphics and uses the Super Scaler arcade system board, created with design input from Yu Suzuki, as technology to simulate 3D effects. The deluxe cabinet version also introduced a motion-controlled arcade cabinet, where the player's body movement on a large motorbike-shaped cabinet corresponds with the player character's movements on screen.

Yu Suzuki began development of Hang-On after deciding to design a motorcycle racing game as a way to use a torsion bar in an arcade game. With market research suggesting GP 500 racing was popular, Suzuki took inspiration from world champion Freddie Spencer and his style of racing. The game's soundtrack was written by Hiroshi Kawaguchi, who used rock music that was uncommon in arcade games at the time. Following its initial release for arcades, Hang-On was ported to Sega's Master System and SG-1000 consoles, as well as to the MSX and PC-88 computers.

Hang-On was very popular at launch and sold well for Sega, becoming the highest-grossing arcade video game of 1985 in the United States and then the highest-grossing arcade game of 1986 in both Japan and the United States. It received a positive critical reception for its realism, graphics, bike cabinet and physical controls, though there was some initial controversy in Japan over modesty concerns involving female players with the bike cabinet. The game started the trend of "taikan" motion simulator games in the late 1980s, which Sega followed with hits such as Space Harrier (1985), Out Run (1986) and After Burner (1987); this helped the arcade video game market recover during the late 1980s. Hang-On has been recognized as a well-remembered and influential arcade game. Several sequels were later made for arcades, as well as video game consoles.

== Gameplay ==
A screenshot from the arcade version of Hang-On displaying the Super Scaler graphics and 3D effects of the 16-bit hardware

Using a behind the motorcycle perspective, the player races a linear race track divided into several stages within a limited time. Players have to lean the motorcycle to turn, with tighter corners requiring a further lean. A throttle similar to a motorcycle has to be twisted to accelerate the bike. The game has one track, pieced together in segments. Reaching a checkpoint at the end of each segment extends the time limit, and remaining time is carried over into the next stage. Running off the track results in the motorcycle crashing and the rider is launched into the air. The game ends if the time runs out or all five stages are completed.

== Development ==
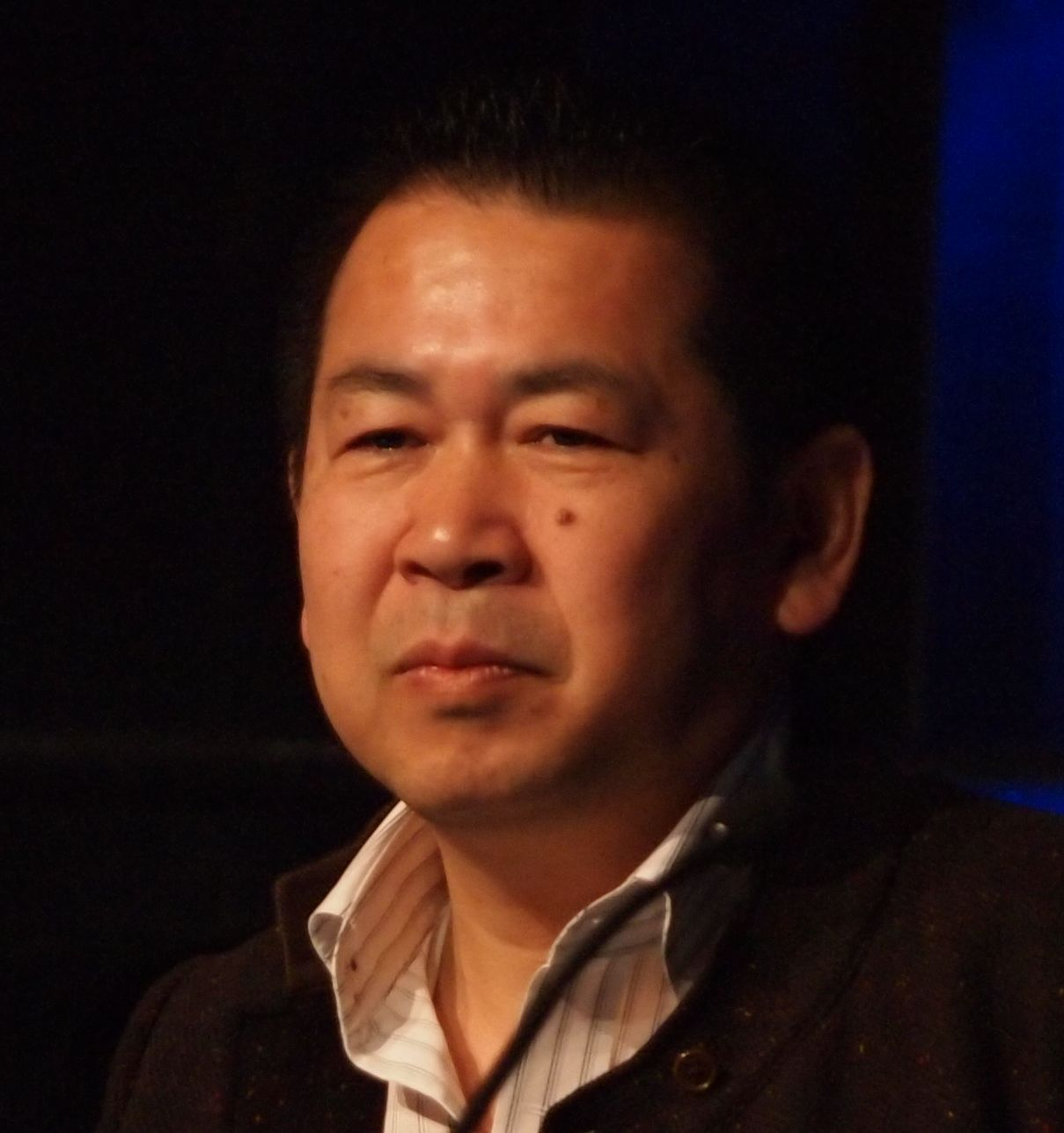
Yu Suzuki was the designer behind Hang-On.

Hang-On was the second game to be developed by Yu Suzuki, the first being 1984's Champion Boxing. Development of Hang-On began with a project brought to him by a colleague who asked him to implement a torsion bar into an arcade game design—although the bar proved too difficult to implement in the final game design and springs were used instead. Suzuki was given the freedom to decide what kind of game to design, and as a fan of cars and motorcycles, he chose to design a game where the arcade cabinet simulated an actual motorcycle and players would have to move side to side on the motorcycle to turn. He also had a desire to make his game better than Pole Position, a Namco game which had beaten out Sega's Turbo in popularity. In developing the game, Suzuki wanted to make his new motorcycle racing game a realistic experience. His initial desire was to create a 3D game, though the technology of the time made full 3D environments impossible. Instead, he specified the design of Sega's new Super Scaler arcade system board—initially known as Sega Hang-On hardware—enhanced from the existing VCO Object system board that would use multiple CPUs and back end DSP compatibility to create 3D effects, while using 16-bit graphics. The game achieves its 3D effects using a sprite-scaling technique.

In designing the game, Suzuki had to decide on a style of motorcycle racing for the game. Suzuki himself was a fan of dirt bikes, along with motocross and Enduro, and dirt bikes would later be used in Suzuki's Enduro Racer, but Sega's market research concluded that road-based GP 500 racing was more popular worldwide. While Suzuki was doing research for the game, he admired the riding style of Freddie Spencer, who had just become the youngest person to win a motorcycling world championship at 21 years old. According to Suzuki: "Freddie Spencer's riding style, it was so nice. And my game was like a homage. That's the reason I wanted to make it – Freddie Spencer, he rode a Honda bike, and I loved the way he hung on!" Two cabinet designs were made: a basic version with a handlebar and levers, and the deluxe cabinet which featured the full motorcycle to be tilted. Suzuki had additional features he wanted to implement that could not be done due to cost, including a gyroscope to simulate motorcycle acceleration and deceleration. The title is derived from when the biker is turning and has to "hang on" to the bike while the bike is leaning, which Suzuki had read in a Japanese bike magazine. Suzuki later learned the technique was called "hang off" in North America, but he chose to keep the former name.

Hang-On is considered well-regarded for its music, which was composed by Hiroshi Kawaguchi. He came to Suzuki's attention after Suzuki heard he played in a band. Suzuki wanted songs for the soundtrack to Hang-On that would be like what a band would play. This led to Kawaguchi writing four songs for the game, including "Theme of Love", the game's theme song. Kawaguchi made use of the hardware's PCM sampling and added drum samples to use Hang-On's Yamaha YM2203 sound chip to its maximum potential and create a more realistic soundtrack featuring rock music, which was uncommon in arcade games at the time. He also created the game's sound effects. Kawaguchi did not program his own music into the game; he instead wrote out his soundtrack by hand, made a demo, and gave that to the sound programmer. He has said this was because he did not own a sequencer, and that this method was faster for him.

== Release ==
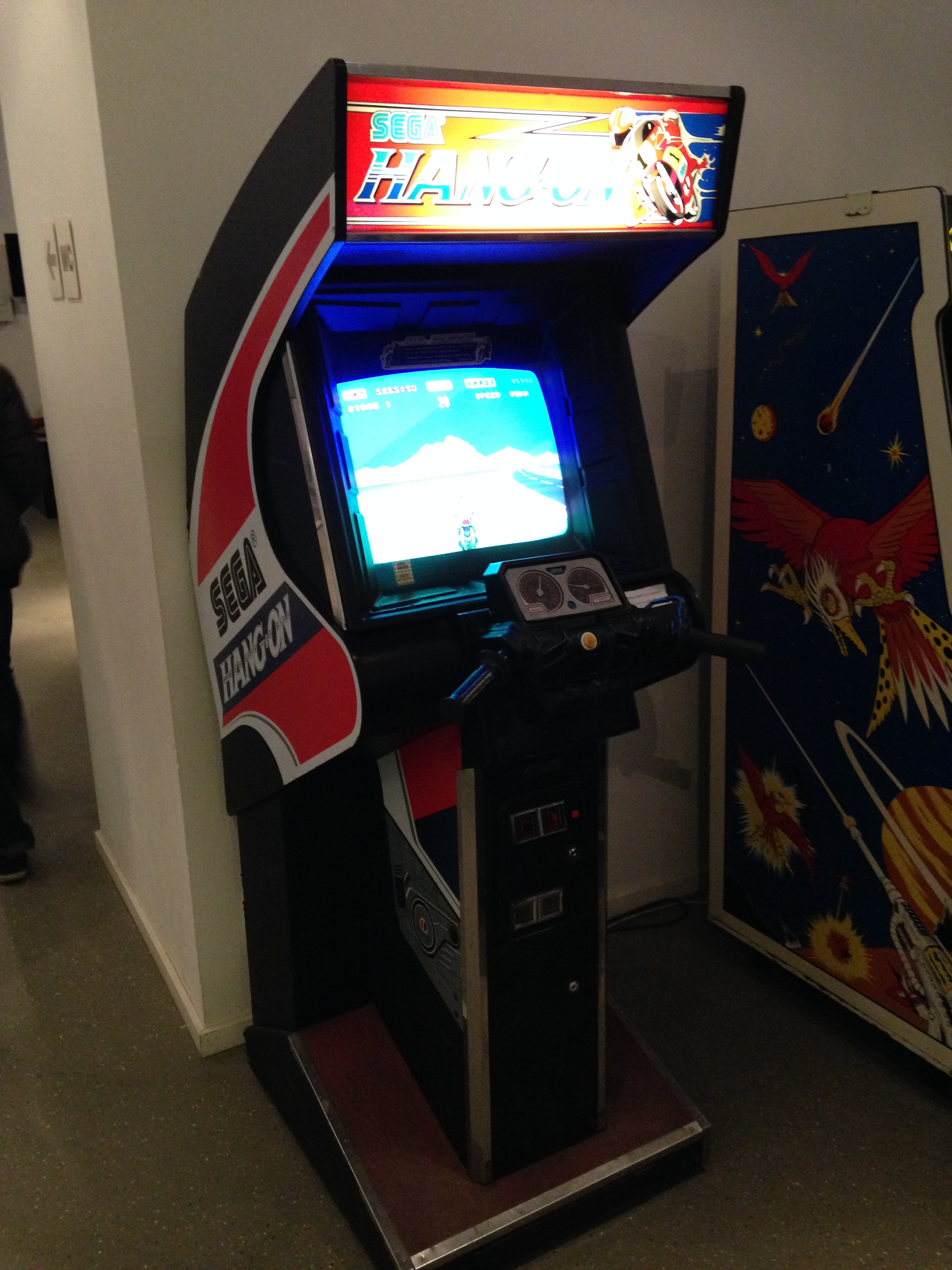
Upright version of the arcade cabinet

Sega debuted Hang-On at the Hotel New Otani Tokyo on 2 July 1985. It drew attention for its innovative ride-on cabinet that realistically simulates a motorcycle and requires the player to use the body, which was a departure from conventional controls that only required using the fingers, as well as its real-time graphics which displayed greater speed and detail than other video games. Hang-On had a mass-market release in Japan several days later on 5 July. At its debut in Japan, Hang-On's deluxe cabinet was criticized as being inappropriate for Japanese culture. Suzuki recalled in an interview about criticisms of how the shyness of the Japanese people would mean no one would want to straddle a motorcycle in front of others, or how the motorcycle would be especially unsuitable for female players wearing miniskirts. These criticisms would eventually subside when players lined up to play the game.

In North America, the game debuted on 22 July, followed by a mass-market release in August. It was introduced to the public by the company's American arcade subsidiary, Sega Enterprises USA, headed by Tom Petit. Previously, Sega Enterprises USA had focused on selling refurbished arcade cabinets, and before the release of Hang-On, Petit was concerned that his division would be shut down due to competition when he was summoned to Japan to meet with Sega president Hayao Nakayama in 1985. Instead, he was brought to be shown the Hang-On deluxe cabinet. Sega Enterprises USA introduced Hang-On to Sega's American and Canadian distributors at the Red Lion Inn in San Jose, California in October 1985. Orders were placed immediately for several hundred units. The success of Hang-On's arcade cabinets, both upright and deluxe, were so great that the company struggled to keep up with demand. In Europe, the game was released in September, and was manufactured by Atari Ireland, a subsidiary of Atari Games (which in turn was a subsidiary of Namco at the time), while Sega Europe of London handled distribution in the region.

=== Home ports ===
A version of the game for the SG-1000 released in 1985 was marketed as a sequel, Hang-On II, though it was essentially a port of the original game simplified to work within the limitations of the console hardware. An upgraded port for the Master System was produced in the same year in Japan, and then was released a year later in 1986 for North America, as the system's pack-in game along with Safari Hunt in a multicart. An additional arcade version based on the Master System port, titled Hang-On Jr., was released in 1986 for Sega's System E arcade system board. The game was also released on the MSX in 1985.

== Reception and legacy ==
=== Commercial performance ===
Sega had shipped approximately 7,000 arcade units worldwide by October 1985, costing about £5,200 or $6,700 (equivalent to $20,000 in 2025) each. In Japan, Game Machine listed Hang-On on their 1 August issue as being the most-successful upright/cockpit arcade cabinet of the month, and it remained at the top of the charts for about six months through January 1986. Internationally, the game became a major global arcade hit upon release in Summer 1985. In North America, it was so successful that the coin mechanism had to be modified for higher-value coins due to the high number of coins being inserted into the machines, while in the United Kingdom each machine was estimated to be earning up to £200 or $257 (equivalent to $769 in 2025) per day. It topped the US RePlay arcade chart for new upright cabinets in November, and topped the US Play Meter arcade charts in December and April 1986.

Hang-On went on to become the highest-grossing arcade video game of 1985 in the United States, and then the highest-grossing arcade game of 1986 in both Japan and the United States. In the United Kingdom, it was the second highest-grossing arcade game of 1986 in London, just below Gradius. The ride-on cabinet was later Japan's ninth highest-grossing upright/cockpit arcade game of 1987. Sega sold 20,000 arcade machines worldwide, making it Sega's best-selling arcade simulator up until then. However, the game was impacted by piracy, with Sega estimating 20,000 to 30,000 counterfeit arcade machines sold illegally.

=== Critical reception ===
Reception

Review scores
Publication	Score	
Publication	Arcade	Master System
Computer and Video Games	Positive	25/30
Génération 4		75%
Sinclair User	Positive	
Tilt		13/20
Computer Gamer	Positive	
Mean Machines		8/10
Sega Pro		78%
VideoGame (BR)		3/5

Award
Publication	Award
Computer Gamer	Best Coin-Op Game of the Year (nomination)

The arcade game received positive reviews from critics upon release. Mike Roberts and Steve Phipps of Computer Gamer magazine called it "one of the best arcade games ever" with particular praise for the bike cabinet and physical controls. Clare Edgeley of Computer and Video Games magazine gave it a rave review. She called it the most realistic arcade game to be released, citing the need to tilt the bike and the placement of the throttle and brake controls being where they are on a real motorcycle. She said it "combines the superb graphics of a Pole Position style race with the physical act of riding a bike". Sinclair User praised Hang-On for its simple-yet-fun gameplay, responsive controls and unique tilt-based arcade cabinet. Computer Gamer magazine's Game of the Year Awards nominated it for best coin-op game of the year, which it lost to Capcom's Commando.

Computer and Video Games and Mean Machines reviewed the Master System port and scored it positively. ACE praised the quality of the Master System conversion, though noted there were some minor graphics jerks compared to the original as well as the loss of the crashing graphics of the arcade version. British magazine Sega Pro called the Master System port "a damn fine racing game".

=== Sequels ===
An arcade sequel, Super Hang-On, was released in 1987, and was famously ported to a range of platforms. A polygon-based sequel developed by Genki was released for the Sega Saturn, named Hang-On GP.

=== Impact ===
In a 1995 interview, Suzuki said he felt Hang-On was his most impressive game at the time of release. Retro Gamer cited Hang-On as the first example of a full-body experience game because of the deluxe cabinet's ride-on controls, and noted the game as being popular, though less impressive than Out Run. Hang-On started the trend of "taikan" motion simulator games in arcades during the mid-to-late 1980s, with "taikan" meaning "body sensation" in Japanese. Sega followed it with hydraulic motion simulator cabinets for rail shooters such as Space Harrier (1985), racing games such as Out Run (1986), and arcade combat flight simulators such as After Burner (1987). Sega have since continued to manufacture motion simulator cabinets for arcade games through to the 2010s.

Former Sega arcade director Akira Nagai has credited Hang-On as one of the titles that helped to bring arcade games out of the 1982 downturn in Japan and created new genres of arcade games. Sega Enterprises USA’s Tom Petit credited Hang-On with helping the North American arcade market recover during the late 1980s with its "high level simulation" technology. Hang-On and Out Run have both been credited by Famitsu with helping to lift the arcade video game industry out of its slump during the mid-1980s, and Play Meter also credit Hang-On and other Japanese video games with helping the US arcade market recover from 1985.

According to video game journalist Ken Horowitz, Hang-On is remembered more for its gameplay than its sales, in part because it was unique in arcades at the time, and that it was an example that "when it came to arcade innovation, Sega was at the top of the industry". Suzuki also considered Hang-On to be a major milestone in video game music. He said "there had been games with short tunes and beeps, but I think Hang On was the first game to have a solid composition with a bass and drums".

== See also ==
- Sega AM2
- Power Drift
- Super Hang-On
