= Out Run =

1986 video game

- European arcade flyer
- Developer: Sega
- Publishers: WW: Sega (arcade); EU: U.S. Gold (computers)
- Director: Yu Suzuki
- Programmers: Yu Suzuki; Satoshi Mifune
- Composer: Hiroshi Kawaguchi
- Series: Out Run
- Platform: Arcade: Master System, Commodore 64, Amstrad CPC, ZX Spectrum, Atari ST, Amiga, MS-DOS, PC-88, PC Engine, Mega Drive/Genesis, Game Gear, Sega Saturn
- Release: September 1986: Arcade; JP: September 1986; NA: November 1986; EU: December 1986 Master System; JP: 30 June 1987; NA/EU: October 1987 C64; EU: 10 December 1987; NA: September 1988 CPC, ZX Spectrum; EU: 10 December 1987 Atari ST; UK: February 1988 Amiga; NA: December 1988; EU: 1989 MS-DOS; NA: March 1989 PC Engine; JP: 21 December 1990 Mega Drive/Genesis; JP: 9 August 1991; NA/EU: 1991 Game Gear; JP: 9 August 1991; EU: November 1991 Saturn; JP: 20 September 1996
- Genre: Racing
- Mode: Single-player
- Arcade system: Sega OutRun

Out Run (Note: Japanese: アウトラン, Hepburn: Auto Ran) is a 1986 racing video game developed and published by Sega for arcades. It is known for its pioneering hardware and graphics, nonlinear gameplay, a selectable soundtrack with music composed by Hiroshi Kawaguchi, and the hydraulic motion simulator deluxe arcade cabinet. The goal is to avoid traffic and reach one of five destinations before time runs out.

Out Run was designed by Yu Suzuki, who traveled to Europe to gain inspiration for the stages. Suzuki's original concept was to base it on the 1981 American film The Cannonball Run, of which he was a fan. He disliked racing games in which cars exploded on impact, and wanted gamers to enjoy the experience of driving and to feel "superior".

Suzuki had a small team and only ten months to program Out Run, leaving him to do most of the work himself. It was a critical and commercial success, becoming the highest-grossing arcade game of 1987 worldwide, as well as Sega's most successful arcade cabinet of the 1980s. It was ported to numerous video game consoles and home computers, becoming one of the best-selling video games at the time and selling millions of copies worldwide. Out Run is considered one of the greatest games and is cited as an influence upon numerous games, playing a role in the arcade industry's recovery, and providing the name for a subgenre of synthwave. It was followed by several sequels, beginning with Turbo OutRun in 1989.

== Gameplay ==
The first stage

Out Run is a pseudo-3D racing video game in which the player controls a Ferrari Testarossa convertible from a third-person rear perspective. The camera is placed near the ground, simulating a Ferrari driver's position and limiting the player's view into the distance. The road curves, crests, and dips, which increases the challenge by obscuring upcoming obstacles such as traffic that the player must avoid. The goal is to reach the finish line against a timer.

Each stage ends in a checkpoint, and reaching the end of a stage provides more time. Near the end of each stage, the track forks to give the player a choice of routes leading to five destinations. The destinations represent different difficulty levels and each concludes with its own ending, among them the Ferrari breaking down or being presented a trophy.

== Development ==
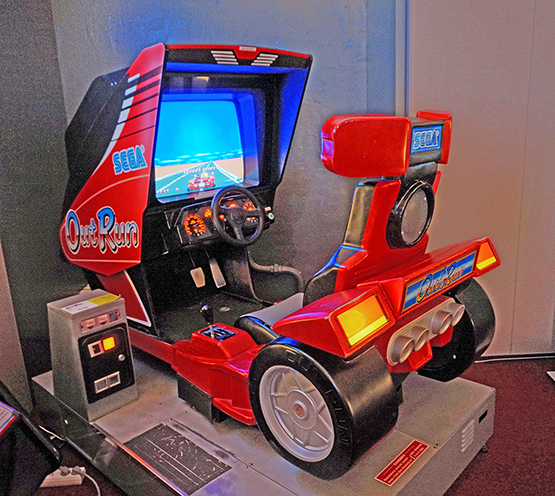
The sit-down deluxe motion simulator cabinet version of Out Run

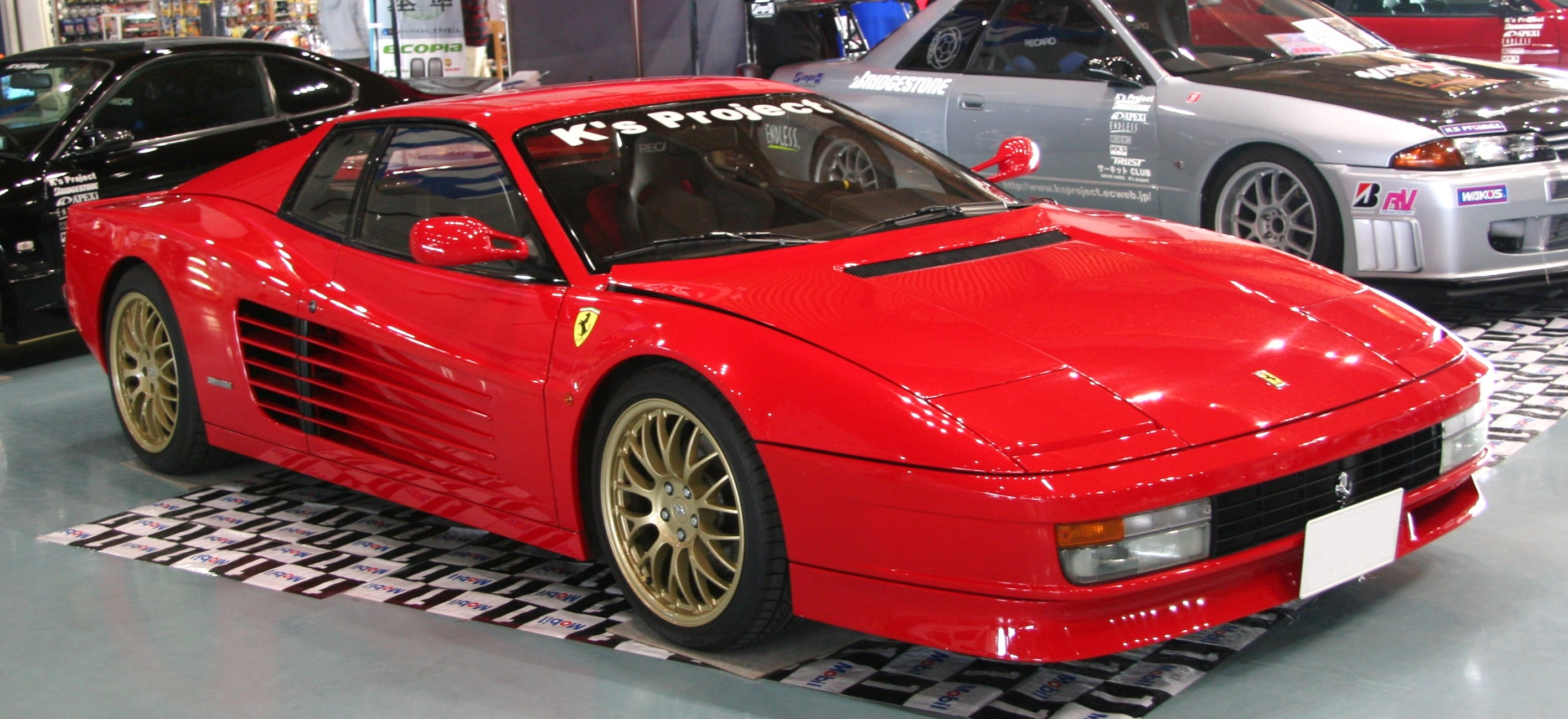
The Out Run car was based on the Ferrari Testarossa (pictured).

During the mid-1980s, Sega had success in the arcades with games developed by Yu Suzuki. Hang-On (1985) was a good seller and Enduro Racer (1986) had been successful enough for Sega to consider a second production run. Both are motorcycle racing games, and Out Run was Suzuki's chance to develop a car racing game. His original concept was to base the game on the 1981 American film The Cannonball Run, of which he was a fan. He disliked racing games in which cars exploded on impact, and wanted gamers to enjoy the experience of driving and to feel "superior".

Suzuki conceived the setting across the United States, and he requested to scout various locations there. According to Suzuki's boss, Youji Ishii, Sega president Hayao Nakayama believed the US was too unsafe, and suggested Europe as a safer option. Additionally, Suzuki concluded that the US was too "large and empty" for the design. He scouted Europe for two weeks in a BMW 520 for ideas. This tour included Frankfurt, Monaco, Rome, the Swiss Alps, the French Riviera, Florence, and Milan. While in Monaco, Suzuki was inspired to use the Ferrari Testarossa as the playable car, so when he returned to Japan he arranged for his team to find and photograph one. They took many photos of the car from every side and recorded the sound of the engine. Sega did not license the Ferrari brand, but paid a settlement fee to avoid legal action after Ferrari complained. Sega licensed the brand for later OutRun games.

A team of four programmers, a sound creator, and five graphic designers developed Out Run. Suzuki had to use only personnel that were not assigned to other projects at the time. As a result, Suzuki did most of the programming and planning himself, spending extra hours at the studio to complete development within ten months. He believed that the most difficult part was to make it as fun as possible, which he achieved by emphasizing the design elements of wide roads, buildings, and a radio with soundtrack selection.

Four cabinet designs were released, all of which are equipped with a steering wheel, a stick shift, and acceleration and brake pedals. Two of the cabinet designs are upright, the larger of which has force feedback in the steering wheel. The other two models are sit-down motion simulator cabinets that resemble the in-game car and use a drive motor to move the main cabinet—turning and shaking according to the onscreen action. Both models feature stereo speakers mounted behind the driver's head. The arcade system board is the Sega OutRun, based on the Sega System 16. Suzuki said that he was often unable to make games based on existing hardware and that Sega would have to create a new board. He said that his "designs were always 3D from the beginning. All the calculations in the system were 3D, even from Hang-On. I calculated the position, scale, and zoom rate in 3D and converted it backwards to 2D. So I was always thinking in 3D". 3D effects are achieved using a sprite-scaling technique called Super Scaler technology, as used one year earlier in Hang-On. Released in September 1986, Out Run's fast sprite-scaling and 3D motion provide a smoother experience than other contemporary arcade games.

Suzuki set about simulating car features that were lacking in earlier racing games, so that being a skillful driver in real life would translate to being skillful in the game. They simulated features such as horsepower, torque, gear ratios, and tire engineering close to real cars. They also added AI assistance for features that were difficult to control, such as drifting. If the tires grip the road surface too closely, the car's handling becomes twitchy, a feature not included in earlier racing games.

=== Soundtrack ===
Out Run's original score was composed by Hiroshi Kawaguchi, who had previously composed soundtracks for other games designed by Suzuki, including Hang-On. The soundtrack is similar in style to Latin and Caribbean music. Kawaguchi has mentioned Latin jazz musician Naoya Matsuoka as a major inspiration for this score. Three selectable tracks are featured: "Passing Breeze", "Splash Wave", and "Magical Sound Shower". An additional track, "Last Wave", plays at the final score screen. Some of the audio samples were corrupted due to one of the master ROM chips failing, and the glitch was not noticed until Sega was preparing a soundtrack box-set for the 20th anniversary. The correct files were recovered from an 8-inch floppy disk, and subsequent releases use the fixed data. Cassette tapes of the arcade soundtrack were distributed in the United Kingdom during December 1987, both with the home computer conversions and with Computer and Video Games magazine. The Mega Drive port has the music tracks from the arcade, along with one exclusive new track titled "Step On Beat" composed by Masayoshi Ishi.

=== Ports and re-releases ===
Out Run was released for the Master System in 1987, and the Genesis in 1991. Out Run was ported to the Amstrad CPC, Commodore 64 and ZX Spectrum home computers for the European market. A conversion of Out Run was under development by Hertz for the X68000 but according to former Hertz employee Tsunetomo Sugawara, it was never released due to company management cancelling its development. A 32X version was also reportedly under development by Sega, but was never released.

Ports of the arcade game were released for Game Boy Advance in the Sega Arcade Gallery, for Nintendo 3DS through the 3D Classics series, and for Saturn and Nintendo Switch as part of the Sega Ages series.

== Reception ==
Reception of Out Run by video game system

Review scores
Publication	Score									
Publication	Amiga	Arcade	Atari ST	C64	Game Gear	Master System	PC	Sega Genesis	TurboGrafx-16	ZX
ACE	822/1000		873/1000	610/1000		852/1000				
Amstrad Action							37% (CPC)			
Commodore User		9/10		67%						
Crash										72%
Computer and Video Games			7/10	24/40		9/10	8/40 (CPC)		70%	
Dragon						4.5/5				
Génération 4			78%			82%				
Joypad								90%		
Joystick					79%			90%		
Sinclair User										81%
The Games Machine (UK)	75%		79%			72%				61%
Your Sinclair										8/10
MegaTech								58%		
Sega-16								9/10		
Svenska Hemdatornytt								85%		

Awards
Publication	Award
Golden Joystick Awards	Game of the Year, Arcade Game of the Year
Amusement Players Association's Players Choice Awards	Best Visual Enhancement in a Video Game

=== Commercial performance ===
In Japan, Out Run topped the Game Machine charts for upright/cockpit arcade cabinets in November 1986, and remained at the top of the charts in the following month. It was Japan's highest-grossing upright/cockpit arcade game during the latter half of 1986, and the overall seventh highest-grossing upright/cockpit arcade game of 1986. Out Run went on to become Japan's highest-grossing arcade game of 1987. In North America, it topped the RePlay dedicated arcade game chart in February 1987, and went on to become the highest-grossing arcade game of 1987 in the United States. In the United Kingdom, it topped London's Electrocoin arcade charts for several months in 1987, from February through June, and was the top arcade game of the year. In Japan, it continued to rank among the annual highest-grossing dedicated arcade games for the next several years, ranking number three in 1988, number five in 1989, and number seven in 1990. In Europe, Out Run was the most popular arcade game during the late 1980s.

Sega had sold 18,000 Out Run arcade machines worldwide by early 1987, including 3,500 units in Japan, 8,000 units in the United States, and 6,500 units in Europe and Southeast Asia. By late 1987, Out Run had sold 20,000 units worldwide, earning Sega over $100 million ($290 million adjusted for inflation) in arcade machine sales, and becoming Sega's best-selling arcade cabinet of the 1980s. By 1994, 30,000 cabinets had been sold worldwide. Sega eventually surpassed OutRun's arcade sales with Virtua Fighter (1993) and Virtua Fighter 2 (1994).

The 8-bit computer game ports published by U.S. Gold sold over 200,000 copies within two weeks of release in the United Kingdom, and more than 250,000 by Christmas 1987, topping the UK's Christmas 1987 chart. Out Run became the fastest-selling and best-selling computer game in the UK that year. By early March 1988, it had sold over 350,000 copies, becoming the UK's all-time fastest-selling game up until then. In May 1988, the Atari ST version of Out Run became the first ST title to top the UK individual machine formats chart compiled by Gallup. The Atari ST version had sold over 25,000 copies in the UK by mid-1988.

Out Run remained on the UK charts for several years. The budget price re-release from Kixx topped the all-formats chart in November 1990, and the Commodore 64 version was at number two on the all-formats chart in March 1991. It also topped the PC Engine charts during January–February 1991. In 2020, Out Run became the second best-selling Sega Ages game in overseas markets outside of Japan (after Sonic the Hedgehog), especially in Europe. As of 2021, the home conversions have sold millions of copies worldwide.

=== Critical response and accolades ===
Out Run's arcade release received positive reviews and became one of the most popular arcade games of the year. It won the 1987 Golden Joystick Award for Game of the Year, as well as for Arcade Game of the Year. It also won "Best Visual Enhancement in a Video Game" at the 1986 Amusement Players Association's Players Choice Awards. Clare Edgeley reviewed the arcade game in both Computer and Video Games and in Sinclair User, praising the graphics, the element of danger, and the hydraulic motion simulator cabinet. Top Score called it "the most enjoyable" and "realistic driving video game ever created" and praised its innovative simulator cabinet, detailed visuals, and stereo soundtrack. Commodore User described it as "a great game for driving enthusiasts" and awarded it a score of 9 out of 10. Gary Penn, writing for Crash, called it "highly polished" and praised the attention to detail. In Your Sinclair, Peter Shaw praised its realism and described it as "the most frighteningly fast road race game" he had played.

Out Run was ported to numerous home consoles and computers. Computer and Video Games praised the Master System release, with the writers concluding that it had "all the thrill power of the arcade version". The Games Machine gave the Master System version a score of 72%, stating that the Master System version came closest to the original coin-op. Reviewers for Dragon described it as a "refreshing" game "that provides hours of entertainment". Computer Gaming World named it as the year's best arcade translation for Sega. Reactions to the 16-bit versions were generally positive. The Atari ST version (1988) was described by Computer and Video Games as "far from perfect", but closer to the arcade original than the other ports. The 1991 Sega Genesis version received 90% from the French magazines Joypad and Joystick, and 85% from the Swedish magazine Svenska Hemdatornytt.

The reception for the 8-bit personal computer ports by U.S. Gold was mixed. The ZX Spectrum version received positive scores from Your Sinclair and Sinclair User. Some reviewers at Crash expressed disappointment at the low quality in contrast to the arcade original. The Games Machine gave the Spectrum version a score of 61%, noting the machine's technical limitations in comparison to the Master System and Commodore systems. The Commodore versions received positive to average reviews, though Computer and Video Games described the Commodore 64 port as "rushed". The Amstrad CPC port received a score of 8 out of 40 from Computer and Video Games, which described it as a "travesty", and a 37% score from Amstrad Action, whose reviewer considered it one of the worst arcade conversions ever.

== Legacy ==
Out Run was followed by the arcade sequels Turbo OutRun (1989), OutRunners (1992) and OutRun 2 (2003), and several sequels for home consoles, including OutRun 3-D (1988), Out Run Europa (1991), OutRun 2019 (1993) and OutRun 2006: Coast 2 Coast (2006). Sega also developed Rad Mobile (1990), which is similar to Out Run.

=== Influence and retrospective views ===
Former Sega arcade director Akira Nagai has credited Out Run and similar games for Sega's arcade success in the 1980s. According to Nagai: "Out Run, in particular, was really amazing for its time... Suzuki went on to make After Burner and a number of other games, but Out Run is still talked about with a special kind of wonder. With the taikan games, Sega's arcade business, which had been Sega's lowest performer in sales, gradually started to rise... For me personally, Hang-On and Out Run are my most memorable titles. They helped lift the arcade industry out of its slump, and created entirely new genres". Synthwave music is also known as "outrun" music, inspired by the Out Run soundtrack and 1980s aesthetic. The French musician Kavinsky named his debut album OutRun (2013).

Out Run has been listed among the best games by Next Generation, Retro Gamer, Stuff, Time, G4, Killer List of Videogames, Yahoo!, and NowGamer. In 2017, GamesRadar+ ranked it the 31st-best Genesis game. Writing in 1001 Video Games You Must Play Before You Die, Joao Diniz Sanches praised Out Run's "unforgettable design and expertly tuned game balance", describing it as "the consummate exhibit in an oversubscribed genre" and "one of the purest and most joyous experiences in video gaming". In 2015, IGN named Out Run the fourth-most influential racing game, behind Pole Position (1982), Gran Turismo (1997) and Virtua Racing (1992). According to Luke Reilly, elements of Out Run can be found in games including Test Drive, Need for Speed, Project Gotham Racing, and Burnout, Forza Horizon and Driveclub. According to Jacopo Prisco of Wired UK, the influence of Out Run is still felt in video games, music and film. The ability to choose which music to listen to on a car radio appeared in games such as the Grand Theft Auto series, and branching paths have appeared in several racing games.

=== Film adaptation ===
On April 21, 2025, Universal Pictures announced that it was developing a live-action film based on Out Run with Michael Bay directing, Jayson Rothwell writing, and Sydney Sweeney producing.
