= List of Sega arcade games =

The following is a list of arcade games developed and published by Sega, many on their arcade system boards. In addition to making its own games, Sega has licensed out its arcade systems to third party publishers. This list comprises all of the games released on these arcade system boards. Sega has been producing electro-mechanical games since the 1960s, arcade video games since the early 1970s, and unified arcade systems since the late 1970s.

== Electro-mechanical games ==
Year	Title	Developer(s)	JP	WW	Ref
1962	Punching Bag	Sega	Yes	Yes	
1962	Skill Diga	Sega	Yes	Yes	
1966	Basketball	Sega	Yes	Yes	
1966	Periscope	Sega, Namco	Yes	Yes	
1967	Rifleman	Sega	Yes	Yes	
1968	Drivemobile	Sega		Yes	
1968	Duck Hunt	Sega	Yes	Yes	
1968	Helicopter	Sega	Yes	Yes	
1968	Mini Futbol	Sega		Yes	
1968	MotoPolo	Sega	Yes	Yes	
1968	Super Skill Diga	Sega	Yes	Yes	
1969	Combat	Sega	Yes	Yes	
1969	Grand Prix	Sega, Kasco	Yes	Yes	
1969	Gun Fight	Sega	Yes	Yes	
1970	Jet Rocket	Sega	Yes	Yes	
1970	Jumbo	Sega	Yes	Yes	
1970	Missile	Sega	Yes	Yes	
1970	Night Rider	Sega	Yes	Yes	
1970	Soccer	Sega	Yes	Yes	
1970	Stunt Car	Sega		Yes	
1971	Astro Data	Sega		Yes	
1971	Derby Day	Sega	Yes		
1971	Dive Bomber	Sega	Yes	Yes	
1971	Monte Carlo	Sega	Yes	Yes	
1972	Air Attack	Sega	Yes	Yes	
1972	Dodgem Crazy	Sega	Yes	Yes	
1972	Grand National Race	Sega	Yes	Yes	
1972	Invaders	Sega		Yes	
1972	Love Tester	Sega		Yes	
1972	Matchlock	Sega		Yes	
1972	Monster Gun	Sega		Yes	
1972	Pro Bowler	Sega	Yes	Yes	
1972	Sand Buggy	Sega	Yes	Yes	
1972	Killer Shark	Sega	Yes	Yes	
1972	Sea Devil	Sega	Yes	Yes	
1972	Sonar	Sega	Yes	Yes	
1973	Attack	Sega	Yes	Yes	
1973	Lunar Rescue	Sega	Yes	Yes	
1973	Moto Champ	Sega	Yes	Yes	
1974	Cowboy	Sega	Yes	Yes	
1974	Fox Hunt	Sega	Yes		
1976	Group Skill Diga	Sega	Yes		
1976	Plinker's Canyon	Sega	Yes	Yes	
1976	Wild Gunman	Nintendo		Yes	
1977	Heli-Shooter	Sega	Yes	Yes	

== Arcade video games ==
=== Early video games ===
Almost every game listed here was released in Japan.

Year	Title	Updates/Versions	Genre(s)	Developer(s)	Arcade system	JP	WW	Ref
1973	Hockey TV		Sports	Sega	Discrete	Yes		
1973	Pong Tron	Pong Tron II	Sports	Sega	Discrete	Yes		
1974	Balloon Gun		Light gun shooter	Sega	Discrete	Yes		
1974	Goal Kick		Sports	Sega	Discrete	Yes		
1974	Mini Hockey		Sports	Sega	Discrete		Yes	
1974	Table Hockey		Sports	Sega	Discrete		Yes	
1975	Bullet Mark		Light gun shooter	Sega	Discrete	Yes	Yes	
1975	Last Inning		Sports	Sega	Discrete	Yes		
1976	Fonz		Racing	Sega	Discrete	Yes	Yes	
1976	Heavyweight Champ		Fighting	Sega	Discrete	Yes		
1976	Rock n' Bark		Shoot 'em up	Sega	Discrete	Yes		
1976	Sparkling Corner		Racing	Sega	Discrete	Yes		
1976	Squadron		Action	Sega	Discrete	Yes		
1976	Tracer		Shoot 'em up	Sega	Discrete		Yes	
1977	Bomber		Shoot 'em up	Sega	Discrete	Yes		
1977	Crash Course		Action	Sega	Discrete	Yes		
1977	Man T.T.		Racing	Sega	Discrete	Yes		
1977	Superbowl		Sports	Sega	Discrete	Yes		
1977	Twin Course T.T.		Racing	Sega	Discrete	Yes		
1977	World Cup		Sports (association football)	Sega	Discrete	Yes	Yes	
1978	Castling		Shoot 'em up	Sega	Discrete	Yes		
1978	Galaxy War		Shoot 'em up	Sega	Discrete	Yes		
1978	Pro Racer		Racing	Sega	Discrete	Yes		
1978	Secret Base		Action	Sega	Discrete	Yes	Yes	
1978	Space Fighter		Shoot 'em up	Sega	Discrete	Yes		
1978	Top Runner		Racing	Sega	Discrete	Yes		
1978	Wild Wood		Shoot 'em up	Sega	Discrete	Yes		
1979	3 Way Block		Action	Sega	Discrete	Yes		
1979	Double Block T3		Action	Sega	Discrete	Yes		
1979	Monaco GP	Super Monaco GP	Racing	Sega	Discrete	Yes	Yes	
1979	Car Hunt		Maze	Sega	?	Yes	?	
1979	Head On		Maze	Gremlin	Dual	Yes	Yes	
1979	Head On 2		Maze	Gremlin	Dual	Yes	Yes	
1979	Invinco		Shoot 'em up	Gremlin	Dual	Yes	Yes	
1979	Space Attack		Shoot 'em up	Sega	Dual	Yes		
1979	Special Dual		Compilation	Sega/Gremlin	Dual	Yes		
1980	Carnival		Shoot 'em up	Gremlin	Dual	Yes	Yes	
1980	Digger (Heiankyo Alien)		Maze	Theoretical Science Group	Dual	Yes	Yes	
1980	Deep Scan		Action	Sega	Dual	Yes	Yes	
1980	Samurai		Action	Sega	Dual			
1980	Tranquilizer Gun		Shoot 'em up	Sega	Dual	Yes		
1980	Space Trek		Shoot 'em up	Sega	Dual	Yes		
1980	N-Sub		Shoot 'em up	Sega	Dual	Yes		
1980	Space Tactics		Space combat	Sega	Discrete	Yes	Yes	
1981	Borderline	Star Raker	Action	Sega	Dual	Yes	Yes	
1981	KO Punch		Non-game	Sega	N/A	Yes		
1981	Space Odyssey		Shoot 'em up	Sega	Dual	Yes	Yes	
1981	Turbo		Racing	Sega	Dual	Yes	Yes	
1981	Turbo		Racing	Sega	VCO Object	Yes	Yes	
1981	005		Stealth	Sega	G80	Yes	Yes	
1981	Astro Blaster		Shoot 'em up	Gremlin	G80	Yes	Yes	
1981	Eliminator		Shoot 'em up	Gremlin	G80	Yes	Yes	
1981	Pulsar		Maze	Gremlin	G80	Yes	Yes	
1981	Space Fury		Shoot 'em up	Gremlin	G80	Yes	Yes	
1981	Frogger		Action	Konami	Galaxian	Yes	Yes	
1981	Tactician		Shoot 'em up	Konami	Pac-Man	Yes	Yes	
1981	Jump Bug		Action	Alpha Denshi	Galaxian	Yes	Yes	
1982	Ali Baba and 40 Thieves		Action	Sega	Z80	Yes		
1982	Monster Bash		Action-horror	Sega	G80	Yes	Yes	
1982	Super Locomotive		Action	Sega	Z80	Yes	Yes	
1982	Tac/Scan		Shoot 'em up	Sega Electronics	G80	Yes		
1982	Pengo		Maze	Coreland	Z80	Yes	Yes	
1982	Star Trek		Shoot 'em up	Sega Electronics	G80		Yes	
1982	SubRoc-3D		Rail shooter	Sega	VCO Object	Yes	Yes	
1982	Zaxxon	Super Zaxxon	Shoot 'em up	Sega, Ikegami Tsushinki	Zaxxon	Yes	Yes	
1982	Zektor		Shoot 'em up	Sega Electronics	G80		Yes	
1983	Sindbad Mystery		Maze	Sega	G80	Yes		
1983	Commando		Shoot 'em up	Sega	Z80	Yes		
1983	Zoom 909 / Buck Rogers: Planet of Zoom		Rail shooter	Sega	VCO Object	Yes	Yes	
1983	Congo Bongo		Action	Sega, Ikegami Tsushinki	Zaxxon	Yes	Yes	
1983	Champion Baseball		Sports	Alpha Denshi	Unknown	Yes	Yes	
1983	Yamato		Shooter	Falcon?	Crazy Climber	Yes	Yes	
1983	Hopper Robo		Action	Sega	Marine Boy	Yes		
1984	Appoooh		Sports (wrestling)	Sanritsu	Z80	Yes		
1984	Bank Panic		Shooter	Sanritsu	Z80	Yes	Yes	
1984	Crowns Golf		Sports	Nasco	Z80	Yes	Yes	
1984	Equites		Shoot 'em up	Alpha Denshi	Unknown	Yes	Yes	
1984	Future Spy		Shoot 'em up	Sega	Zaxxon	Yes	Yes	
1985	Crowns Golf in Hawaii		Sports	Nasco	Z80	Yes		
1985	Flashgal		Action	Kyugo	Kyugo	Yes	Yes	
1985	Repulse		Shoot 'em up	Crux	Kyugo	Yes	Yes	
1986	Legend		Action	Coreland	Kyugo	Yes		
1986	Calorie-kun vs. Moguranian		Action	Graphic Techno EW	Z80	Yes		
1986	Robo Wres 2001		Sports	Sanritsu	Z80	Yes		
1986	Flower		Shoot 'em up	Clarue?	Z80	Yes	Yes	
1986	Gigas	Gigas Mark II	Action	Nihon System	Gigas	Yes		
1986	Space Position		Racing	Nasco	Z80	Yes		
1987	Combat Hawk		Shooter	Sanritsu	Z80	Yes		
1987	Free Kick		Action	Nihon System	Gigas	Yes		
1987	Perfect Billiard		Sports	Nihon System	Gigas	Yes		
1988	Angel Kids		Action	Exa Planning	Z80	Yes		
1988	Counter Run		Action	Nihon System	Gigas	Yes		
1989	DJ Boy		Action	Kaneko	?	Yes	Yes	

=== Sega Laserdisc series ===
The following are LaserDisc games that ran on Sega LaserDisc arcade hardware.

Year	Title	Genre	Ref
1983	Astron Belt	Rail shooter	
1983	Star Blazer (Galaxy Ranger)	Rail shooter	
1983	Albegas	Rail shooter	
1984	GP World	Racing	
1991	Time Traveler	Interactive film	
1991	AS-1	Interactive film	
1992	Muggo	Interactive film	
1993	Megalopolis: Tokyo City Battle	Interactive film	
1993	Michael Jackson in Scramble Training	Interactive film	
1993	Aqua Nova	Simulation ride	

=== Sega System series ===
Almost every game listed here was released in Japan.

Year	Title	Updates/Versions	Genre(s)	Developer(s)	Arcade system	Exported	Ref
1983	Regulus		Shoot 'em up	Sega	System 1	Yes	
1983	Star Jacker		Shoot 'em up	Sega	System 1		
1983	Up'n Down		Racing	Sega	System 1	Yes	
1984	Flicky		Action	Sega	System 1	Yes	
1984	Bull Fight		Sports	Coreland	System 1	Yes	
1984	Mister Viking		Shoot 'em up	Sega	System 1	Yes	
1984	Spatter		Action	Sega	System 1		
1984	SWAT		Shoot 'em up	Coreland	System 1	Yes	
1984	Water Match		Sports	Sega	System 1	Yes	
1985	4-D Warriors		Shoot 'em up	Coreland	System 1		
1985	Choplifter		Action	Sega	System 2		
1985	Hang-On		Racing	Sega (AM2)	Super Scaler	Yes	
1985	Heavy Metal		Shoot 'em up	Sega	System 2		
1985	I'm Sorry		Action	Coreland	System 1	Yes	
1985	Major League		Sports	Sega	System 16	Yes	
1985	My Hero		Action	Coreland	System 1	Yes	
1985	Ninja Princess		Action	Sega	System 1	Yes	
1985	Pitfall II - The Lost Caverns		Action	Sega	System 1	Yes	
1985	Shooting Master		Light gun shooter	Sega	System 2	Yes	
1985	Space Harrier		Rail shooter	Sega (AM2)	Super Scaler	Yes	
1985	Teddy Boy Blues		Action	Sega	System 1		
1986	119		Action	Coreland	System 2		
1986	Action Fighter		Action	Sega	System 16		
1986	Alex Kidd: The Lost Stars		Action	Sega	System 16		
1986	Brain		Shoot 'em up	Coreland	System 1		
1986	Body Slam		Sports	Sega	System 16	Yes	
1986	Enduro Racer		Racing	Sega	Super Scaler	Yes	
1986	Fantasy Zone		Shoot 'em up	Sega	System 16	Yes	
1986	Gardia		Shoot 'em up	Coreland	System 1		
1986	Rafflesia		Shoot 'em up	Coreland	System 1		
1986	Warball		Sports	Sega	System 2		
1986	Wonder Boy		Platform	Westone	System 1	Yes	
1986	Out Run		Racing	Sega (AM2)	Sega OutRun	Yes	
1987	After Burner	After Burner II	Combat flight simulator	Sega (AM2)	X Board	Yes	
1987	Block Gal		Adult	Vic Tokai	System 1		
1987	Alien Syndrome		Shoot 'em up	Sega	System 16	Yes	
1987	Bullet		Shoot 'em up	Sega	System 16		
1987	Dunk Shot		Sports	Sega	System 16	Yes	
1987	Heavyweight Champ		Sports	Sega	System 16		
1987	Quartet	Quartet 2	Action	Sega	System 16	Yes	
1987	SDI		Shoot 'em up	Sega	System 16	Yes	
1987	Shinobi		Action	Sega	System 16	Yes	
1987	Sonic Boom		Shoot 'em up	Sega	System 16	Yes	
1987	Super League		Sports	Sega	System 16		
1987	Super Hang-On		Racing	Sega	Super Scaler	Yes	
1987	Thunder Blade		Rail shooter	Sega	X Board	Yes	
1987	Time Scanner		Action	Sega	System 16		
1987	Toki no Senshi: Chrono Soldier		Action	EXA Planning	System 2		
1987	Wonder Boy: Monster Land		Action	Westone	System 2		
1988	Altered Beast		Action	Sega (Team Shinobi)	System 16	Yes	
1988	Dakkochan House		Adult	Whiteboard	System 2		
1988	Dynamite Düx		Action	Sega (AM2)	System 16		
1988	Gain Ground		Action, Strategy	Sega	System 24	Yes	
1988	Galaxy Force	Galaxy Force II	Rail shooter	Sega	Y Board	Yes	
1988	Hot Rod	Hot Rod Turbo	Racing	Sega	System 24	Yes	
1988	Passing Shot		Sports	Sega	System 16	Yes	
1988	Power Drift	Power Drift Link	Racing	Sega (AM2)	Y Board	Yes	
1988	Scramble Spirits		Shoot 'em up	Sega	System 24	Yes	
1988	Tetris		Puzzle	Sega	System 16		
1988	UFO Senshi Youko-chan		Action	Vic Tokai	System 2		
1988	Wonder Boy III: Monster Lair		Action	Westone	System 16	Yes	
1989	Sukeban Janshi Ryuuko		Adult	Whiteboard	System 16		
1989	Ace Attacker		Sports	Sega	System 16		
1989	Bay Route		Action	Sunsoft	System 16	Yes	
1989	Crack Down		Action	Sega	System 24	Yes	
1989	Cyber Police ESWAT		Action	Sega	System 16	Yes	
1989	Excite League		Sports	Sega	System 16		
1989	Flash Point		Puzzle	Sega	System 16		
1989	Golden Axe		Action	Sega	System 16	Yes	
1989	Last Survivor		TPS	Sega	X Board	Yes	
1989	Line of Fire		Shooter	Sega	X Board	Yes	
1989	M.V.P.		Sports	Sega	System 16	Yes	
1989	Shadow Dancer		Action	Sega	System 18	Yes	
1989	Super Masters		Sports (golf)	Sega	System 24	Yes	
1989	Super Monaco GP		Racing	Sega	X Board	Yes	
1989	Tough Turf		Action	Sunsoft	System 16	Yes	
1989	Wrestle War		Sports	Sega	System 16	Yes	
1989	Turbo OutRun		Racing	Sega (AM2)	Sega OutRun	Yes	
1990	Alien Storm		Action	Sega	System 18	Yes	
1990	Aurail		Shoot 'em up	Westone	System 16		
1990	A.B. Cop		Racing	Aicom	X Board		
1990	Bonanza Bros.		Action	Sega	System 24	Yes	
1990	G-LOC: Air Battle		Rail shooter	Sega (AM2)	Y Board	Yes	
1990	GP Rider		Racing	Sega (AM2)	X Board	Yes	
1990	Racing Hero		Racing	Sega	X Board		
1990	Rough Racer		Racing	Sega	System 24		
1990	Laser Ghost		Light gun shooter	Sega	System 18	Yes	
1990	Michael Jackson's Moonwalker		Action	Sega	System 18	Yes	
1990	Ryukyu		Puzzle	Success	System 16B		
1991	Clutch Hitter		Sports	Sega	System 18	Yes	
1991	Cotton: Fantastic Night Dreams		Shoot 'em up	Success	System 16	Yes	
1991	D. D. Crew		Action	Sega (AM3)	System 18	Yes	
1991	Dynamic Country Club		Sports	Sega (AM3)	System 24		
1991	F1 Exhaust Note	F1 Super Lap	Racing	Sega (AM2)	System 32	Yes	
1991	Rad Mobile		Racing	Sega (AM3)	System 32	Yes	
1991	Rail Chase		Light gun shooter	Sega (AM3)	Y Board	Yes	
1991	Riot City		Action	Westone	System 16		
1991	Strike Fighter		Rail shooter	Sega (AM2)	Y Board		
1991	Desert Breaker		Shoot 'em up	Sega (AM1)	System 18		
1991	Spider-Man: The Video Game		Action	Sega	System 32	Yes	
1991	Quiz Rōka ni Tattenasai		Quiz	Sega (AM1)	System 24		
1991	Quiz Syukudai wo Wasuremashita		Quiz	Sega (AM1)	System 24		
1992	Air Rescue		Action	Sega (AM1)	System 32	Yes	
1992	Arabian Fight		Action	Sega (AM2)	System 32	Yes	
1992	Dark Edge		Fighting	Sega (AM3)	System 32	Yes	
1992	Golden Axe: The Revenge of Death Adder		Action	Sega (AM1)	System 32	Yes	
1992	Holosseum		Fighting	Sega (AM1)	System 32	Yes	
1992	Soreike Kokology		Quiz	Sega (AM2)	System 32		
1992	Stadium Cross		Racing	Sega (AM1)	System 32	Yes	
1992	Tokoro San no MahMahjan		Tabletop	Sega (AM1)	System 24		
1992	OutRunners		Racing	Sega (AM1)	System 32	Yes	
1992	Wally wo Sagase!		Puzzle	Sega (AM3)	System 18		
1992	Witch		Action	Vic Tokai	Unknown		
1993	Title Fight		Boxing	Sega (AM3)	System 32	Yes	
1993	Alien 3: The Gun		Light gun shooter	Sega (AM1)	System 32	Yes	
1993	Burning Rival		Fighting	Sega (AM2)	System 32		
1993	SegaSonic Cosmo Fighter		Shoot 'em up	Sega (AM1)	System 32		
1993	SegaSonic the Hedgehog		Action	Sega (AM3)	System 32	Yes	
1993	Quiz Mekurumeku Story		Quiz	Sega (AM1)	System 24		
1994	Hard Dunk		Sports	Sega (AM3)	System 32	Yes	
1994	Jurassic Park		Light gun shooter	Sega (AM3)	System 32	Yes	
1994	Soreike Kokology 2		Quiz	Sega (AM2)	System 32		
1994	Super Visual Soccer		Sports	Sega (AM1)	System 32	Yes	
1994	Tokoro San no MahMahjan 2		Tabletop	Sega (AM1)	System 24		
1994	Quiz Ghost Hunter		Puzzle	Sega (AM1)	System 24		
1995	Cool Riders		Racing	Sega (AM1)	System H1	Yes	
1995	Slipstream		Racing	Capcom	System 32	Yes	
1995	Toryuumon		Puzzle	Sega (AM1), JAMP	System 16B		
1996	Quiz Magical Brain		Quiz	Sega (AM1)	System 24		
1996	Waku Waku Ultraman Racing		Kiddie ride	Sega (AM1)	System 16B		

=== Sega System E ===
The System E is based on Master System hardware.

Year	Title	Genre(s)	Developer(s)	JP	WW	Ref
1985	Hang-On Jr.	Racing	Sega	Yes		
1986	Transformer (Astro Flash)	Shoot 'em up	Sega	Yes	Yes	
1986	Riddle of Pythagoras	Action	Nasco	Yes		
1986	Slap Shooter	Sports	Sega	Yes		
1987	Fantasy Zone: The Maze (Opa Opa)	Action	Sega	Yes		
1988	Fantasy Zone II	Shoot 'em up	Sega	Yes		
1988	Tetris (also released for System 16)	Puzzle	Sega	Yes		

=== Genesis-based ===
The System C/C2, Mega-Tech, and Mega-Play are based on the hardware of the Genesis / Mega Drive.

Year	Title	Genre(s)	Developer(s)	Arcade system	Exported	Ref
1990	Bloxeed	Puzzle	Sega	System C	Yes	
1990	Borench	Puzzle	Sega	System C2	Yes	
1990	Columns	Puzzle	Sega	System C	Yes	
1990	Thunder Force AC	Shoot 'em up	Technosoft	System C2		
1991	Twin Squash	Action	Sega	System C2		
1991	Waku Waku Sonic Patrol Car	Kiddie ride	Sega (AM1)	System C2		
1992	Columns II	Puzzle	Sega	System C2	Yes	
1992	Puzzle & Action: Tant-R	Mini games	Sega (AM1)	System C2		
1992	Puyo Puyo	Puzzle	Sega (AM1), Compile	System C2		
1992	Ribbit!	Action	Sega	System C2		
1992	Waku Waku Marine	Kiddie ride	Sega	System C2		
1993	SegaSonic Popcorn Shop	Non-game	Sega (AM1)	System C2		
1994	PotoPoto	Puzzle	Sega (AM3)	System C2		
1994	Puyo Puyo 2	Puzzle	Compile	System C2		
1994	Puzzle & Action: Ichidant-R	Mini games	Sega (AM1)	System C2		
1994	Stack Columns	Puzzle	Sega (AM1)	System C2		
1994	Zunzunkyou no Yabou	Shoot 'em up	Sega (AM1) Minato Giken	System C2		
1995	Print Club	Non-game	Atlus	System C2		

=== Sega Model series ===
Almost every game listed here was released in Japan.

Year	Title	Updates/Versions	Genre(s)	Developer(s)	Arcade system	Exported	Ref
1992	Virtua Racing		Racing	Sega (AM2)	Model 1	Yes	
1993	Virtua Fighter		Fighting	Sega (AM2)	Model 1	Yes	
1993	Star Wars Arcade		Light gun shooter	Sega (AM3)	Model 1	Yes	
1994	Daytona USA		Racing	Sega (AM2)	Model 2	Yes	
1994	Desert Tank		Action	Sega (AM2)	Model 2	Yes	
1994	Virtua Fighter 2	Virtua Fighter 2.1	Fighting	Sega (AM2)	Model 2A-CRX	Yes	
1994	Virtua Cop		Light gun shooter	Sega (AM2)	Model 2	Yes	
1994	Virtua Striker		Sports	Sega (AM2)	Model 2B-CRX	Yes	
1994	Wing War		Simulation	Sega (AM1)	Model 1	Yes	
1994	Sega Rally Championship		Racing	Sega (AM3)	Model 2A-CRX	Yes	
1995	Fighting Vipers		Fighting	Sega (AM2)	Model 2B-CRX	Yes	
1995	Indy 500		Racing	Sega (AM1)	Model 2B-CRX	Yes	
1995	Manx TT Superbike		Racing	Sega (AM3)	Model 2A-CRX	Yes	
1995	Rail Chase 2		Light gun shooter	Sega (AM3)	Model 2B-CRX	Yes	
1995	Sky Target		Rail shooter	Sega (AM1)	Model 2A-CRX	Yes	
1995	Virtua Cop 2		Light gun shooter	Sega (AM2)	Model 2A-CRX	Yes	
1996	The House of the Dead		Light gun shooter	Sega (AM1)	Model 2C-CRX	Yes	
1996	Dead or Alive		Fighting	Tecmo	Model 2A-CRX	Yes	
1996	Dynamite Baseball		Sports	Sega (AM1)	Model 2B-CRX		
1996	Last Bronx		Fighting	Sega (AM3)	Model 2B-CRX	Yes	
1996	Virtual On: Cyber Troopers		Action	Sega (AM3)	Model 2B-CRX	Yes	
1996	Gunblade NY		Light gun shooter	Sega (AM3)	Model 2B-CRX	Yes	
1996	Scud Race	Scud Race Plus	Racing	Sega (AM2)	Model 3 Step 1.5	Yes	
1996	Sega Ski Super G		Sports	Sega (AM1)	Model 2C-CRX	Yes	
1996	Sega Touring Car Championship		Racing	Sega (AM Annex)	Model 2C-CRX	Yes	
1996	Sonic the Fighters		Fighting	Sega (AM2)	Model 2B-CRX	Yes	
1996	Virtua Fighter 3	Virtua Fighter 3 Team Battle	Fighting	Sega (AM2)	Model 3 Step 1.0	Yes	
1996	WaveRunner		Racing	Sega (AM1)	Model 2A-CRX	Yes	
1997	Dynamite Baseball 97		Sports	Sega (AM1)	Model 2B-CRX		
1997	Motor Raid		Racing	Sega (AM1)	Model 2A-CRX	Yes	
1997	Behind Enemy Lines		Light gun shooter	Real3D	Model 2C-CRX	Yes	
1997	Harley-Davidson & L.A. Riders		Action, Driving	Sega (AM1)	Model 3 Step 2.0	Yes	
1997	Le Mans 24		Racing	Sega (AM3)	Model 3 Step 1.5	Yes	
1997	Sega Water Ski		Sports	Sega (AM1)	Model 2	Yes	
1997	The Lost World: Jurassic Park		Light gun shooter	Sega (AM3)	Model 3	Yes	
1997	Top Skater		Sports	Sega (AM3)	Model 2C-CRX	Yes	
1997	Over Rev		Racing	Jaleco	Model 2C-CRX		
1997	Virtua Striker 2	Virtua Striker 2 '98, Virtua Striker 2 '99	Sports	Sega (AM2)	Model 3 Step 1.5	Yes	
1997	Zero Gunner		Shoot-'em-Up	Psikyo	Model 2A-CRX		
1998	Cyber Troopers Virtual-On Oratorio Tangram		Action	Sega (AM3)	Model 3 Step 2.0		
1998	Daytona USA 2: Battle on the Edge	Daytona USA 2: Power Edition	Racing	Sega (AM2)	Model 3 Step 2.1	Yes	
1998	Dirt Devils		Racing	Sega (AM3)	Model 3 Step 2.1	Yes	
1998	Dynamite Cop		Action	Sega (AM1)	Model 2A-CRX	Yes	
1998	Fighting Vipers 2		Fighting	Sega (AM2)	Model 3 Step 1.0	Yes	
1998	L.A. Machineguns		Light gun shooter	Sega (AM3)	Model 3 Step 2.1	Yes	
1998	Sega Bass Fishing		Action, Simulation	Sega (AM3)	Model 3 Step 1.0	Yes	
1998	Sega Rally 2		Racing	Sega (AM Annex)	Model 3 Step 2.0	Yes	
1998	SpikeOut	SpikeOut: Final Edition	Action	Sega (AM2)	Model 3 Step 2.1	Yes	
1998	Ski Champ		Racing	Sega (AM1)	Model 3 Step 2.0	Yes	
1998	Star Wars Trilogy Arcade		Light gun shooter	Sega (AM12)	Model 3 Step 2.1	Yes	
1998	The Ocean Hunter		Light gun shooter	Sega (AM1)	Model 3 Step 2.1	Yes	
1999	Emergency Call Ambulance		Driving	Sega (AM1)	Model 3 Step 2.1	Yes	
1999	Magical Truck Adventure		Action	Sega (AM3)	Model 3 Step 2.1	Yes	
1999	Pilot Kids		Shoot-'em-Up	Psikyo	Model 2A-CRX		

=== Sega Titan Video ===
The ST-V was based on Sega Saturn hardware.

Year	Title	Updates/Versions	Genre(s)	Developer	JP	WW	Ref
1994	Sports Fishing	Sports Fishing 2	Sports, Simulation	Sega	Yes		
1994	Waku Waku Tama & Friends		Kiddie ride	Sega (AM1)			
1995	Baku Baku Animal		Puzzle	Sega (AM3)	Yes		
1995	Critter Crusher		Action	Sega (AM1)	Yes		
1995	Ejihon Tantei Jimusho		Puzzle	Sega (AM1)	Yes		
1995	Funky Head Boxers		Fighting	Sega (AM3)	Yes		
1995	Golden Axe: The Duel		Fighting	Sega (AM1)	Yes		
1995	Pro Mahjong Kiwame S		Tabletop	Athena	Yes		
1995	Puzzle & Action: Treasure Hunt		Mini games	Sega (AM1)	Yes		
1995	Shanghai: Triple-Threat		Puzzle	Activision	Yes		
1995	Super Major League		Sports	Sega (AM1)	Yes	Yes	
1995	Outlaws of the Lost Dynasty		Fighting	Data East	Yes		
1995	Virtua Fighter Remix		Fighting	Sega (AM1)	Yes	Yes	
1996	Batman Forever: The Arcade Game		Action	Probe Entertainment		Yes	
1996	Decathlete		Sports	Sega (AM3)	Yes		
1996	Die Hard Arcade		Action	Sega (AM1)	Yes	Yes	
1996	Purikura Daisakusen		Action	Atlus	Yes		
1996	Puyo Puyo Sun		Puzzle	Compile	Yes		
1996	Virtua Fighter Kids		Fighting	Sega (AM2)	Yes	Yes	
1997	All Japan Pro Wrestling Featuring Virtua		Fighting	Sega (AM1)	Yes		
1997	Cotton 2: Magical Night Dreams		Shoot' em-up	Success	Yes		
1997	Groove on Fight		Fighting	Atlus	Yes		
1997	Hanagumi Taisen Columns		Puzzle	Sega	Yes		
1997	Maru-chan de Goo!		Action	Sega (AM1)	Yes		
1997	Print Club 2		Non-game	Atlus	Yes	Yes	
1997	Shienryu		Shoot' em-up	Warashi	Yes		
1997	Steep Slope Sliders		Sports	Cave	Yes		
1997	Waku Waku Shinkansen		Kiddie ride	Sega (AM1)			
1997	Winter Heat		Sports	Sega (AM3)	Yes		
1998	Astra Superstars		Fighting	Sunsoft	Yes		
1998	Guardian Force		Shoot' em-up	Success	Yes		
1998	Radiant Silvergun		Shoot' em-up	Treasure	Yes		
1998	Taisen Tanto-R Sasissu!		Mini games	Sega (AM1)	Yes		
1998	Touryuu Densetsu Elan Doree		Fighting	Sai-Mate	Yes		
1998	Magical Night Dreams: Cotton Boomerang		Shoot' em-up	Success	Yes		
1998	Tecmo World Cup '98		Sports	Tecmo	Yes		
1998	Waku Waku Shoubousya		Kiddie ride	Sega (AM1)			
1999	Final Fight Revenge		Fighting	Capcom	Yes		
1999	Mogu Rapper		Rhythm	Sega	Yes		

=== Sega NAOMI series ===
The Sega NAOMI series was based on Sega Dreamcast hardware.

Year	Title	Updates/Versions	Genre(s)	Developer(s)	Arcade system	JP	WW	Ref
1998	Dynamite Baseball NAOMI	Dynamite Baseball '99	Sports	Sega (AM1)	NAOMI	Yes		
1998	F1 World Grand Prix		Racing	Video System	NAOMI	Yes		
1998	The House of the Dead 2		Light gun shooter	Sega (AM1)	NAOMI	Yes	Yes	
1999	18 Wheeler: American Pro Trucker		Driving	Sega (AM2)	NAOMI	Yes	Yes	
1999	Airline Pilots		Simulation	Sega (AM1)	NAOMI	Yes	Yes	
1999	Brave FireFighters		Light gun shooter	Sega (AM1)	Hikaru	Yes	Yes	
1999	Charge'N'Blast		Action	CRI	NAOMI	Yes		
1999	Crazy Taxi		Driving	Sega (AM3)	NAOMI	Yes	Yes	
1999	Dead or Alive 2	Dead or Alive 2 Millenium	Fighting	Tecmo	NAOMI	Yes		
1999	Dengen Tenshi Taisen Mahjong Shangri-La		Tabletop	Marvelous	NAOMI	Yes		
1999	Derby Owners Club	Derby Owners Club 2000, Derby Owners Club World Edition, Derby Owners Club 2	Simulation	Sega (AM3)	NAOMI	Yes		
1999	F355 Challenge	F355 Challenge 2: International Course Edition	Racing	Sega (AM2)	NAOMI	Yes	Yes	
1999	Giant Gram 2 : All Japan Pro Wrestling In Nippon Budokan		Fighting	Sega (AM1)	NAOMI	Yes		
1999	Idol Janshi Suchie-Pai III		Tabletop	Jaleco	NAOMI	Yes		
1999	Jambo! Safari		Driving	Sega (AM1)	NAOMI	Yes	Yes	
1999	Kasei Channel Mars TV		Tabletop	Sega (AM3)	NAOMI	Yes		
1999	Power Stone		Fighting	Capcom	NAOMI	Yes	Yes	
1999	Puyo Puyo Da!		Rhythm	Compile	NAOMI	Yes		
1999	Ring Out 4x4		Action	Sega	NAOMI	Yes		
1999	Outtrigger		FPS, TPS	Sega (AM2)	NAOMI	Yes		
1999	Samba de Amigo	Samba de Amigo Ver. 2000	Rhythm	Sega (Sonic Team)	NAOMI	Yes	Yes	
1999	Sega Marine Fishing		Simulation	Sega (AM1)	NAOMI	Yes	Yes	
1999	Sega Tetris		Puzzle	Sega (AM1)	NAOMI	Yes		
1999	Super Major League '99		Sports	Sega (AM1)	NAOMI	Yes	Yes	
1999	Touch De Uno!		Puzzle	Sega (AM3)	NAOMI	Yes		
1999	Toy Fighter		Fighting	Sega (AM3), Anchor	NAOMI	Yes	Yes	
1999	The Typing of the Dead		Edutainment	Sega (AM1)	NAOMI	Yes	Yes	
1999	Virtua Tennis		Sports	Sega (AM3)	NAOMI	Yes	Yes	
1999	Virtua Striker 2 ver.2000		Sports	Sega (AM11)	NAOMI	Yes		
1999	Zombie Revenge		Action	Sega (AM1)	NAOMI	Yes	Yes	
2000	Cannon Spike		Shoot' em-up	Capcom	NAOMI	Yes	Yes	
2000	Capcom vs. SNK Millennium Fight 2000		Fighting	Capcom	NAOMI	Yes	Yes	
2000	Confidential Mission		Light gun shooter	Sega (Hitmaker)	NAOMI	Yes	Yes	
2000	Crackin' DJ	Crackin' DJ Part 2	Rhythm	Sega (Hitmaker)	NAOMI	Yes		
2000	Cyber Troopers Virtual-On: Oratorio Tangram M.S.B.S. Ver. 5.66		Action	Sega (Hitmaker)	NAOMI	Yes		
2000	Death Crimson OX		Light gun shooter	Ecole	NAOMI	Yes		
2000	Giant Gram 2000 : All Japan Pro Wrestling 3 Brave Men Of Glory		Fighting	Sega (WOW Entertainment)	NAOMI	Yes		
2000	Giga Wing 2		Shoot' em-up	Capcom	NAOMI	Yes		
2000	Marvel vs. Capcom 2: New Age of Heroes		Fighting	Capcom	NAOMI	Yes	Yes	
2000	Ninja Assault		Light gun shooter	Namco	NAOMI	Yes		
2000	Quiz Aa! Megami-sama: Tatakau Tsubasa to Tomoni		Quiz	Sega (WOW Entertainment)	NAOMI	Yes	Yes	
2000	Planet Harriers		Rail shooter	Sega (Amusement Vision)	Sega Hikaru	Yes	Yes	
2000	Project Justice		Fighting	Capcom	NAOMI	Yes		
2000	Power Stone 2		Fighting	Capcom	NAOMI	Yes		
2000	Shakatto Tambourin		Rhythm	Sega	NAOMI	Yes		
2000	Sega Strike Fighter		Shoot' em-up	Sega (WOW Entertainment)	NAOMI	Yes	Yes	
2000	SlashOut		Action	Sega (Amusement Vision)	NAOMI	Yes	Yes	
2000	Spawn: In the Demon's Hand		Action	Capcom	NAOMI	Yes	Yes	
2000	Sports Jam		Sports	Sega (WOW Entertainment)	NAOMI	Yes		
2000	Star Wars Racer Arcade		Racing	Sega (Sega Rosso)	Hikaru	Yes	Yes	
2000	Tokyo Bus Tour		Simulation	Fortyfive	NAOMI	Yes		
2000	World Kicks		Sports	Namco	NAOMI	Yes		
2000	WWF Royal Rumble		Fighting	Yuke	NAOMI		Yes	
2000	Virtua NBA		Sports	Sega (Amusement Vision)	NAOMI	Yes	Yes	
2001	Alien Front		Action	Sega (WOW Entertainment)	NAOMI	Yes		
2001	Air Trix		Sports	Sega (Hitmaker)	Hikaru	Yes	Yes	
2001	Beach Spikers		Sports	Sega (AM2)	NAOMI 2	Yes		
2001	Capcom vs. SNK 2 Millionaire Fighting		Fighting	Capcom	NAOMI	Yes		
2001	Club Kart		Racing	Sega	NAOMI 2	Yes	Yes	
2001	Cyber Troopers Virtual-On Force		Action	Sega (Hitmaker)	Hikaru	Yes	Yes	
2001	Doki Doki Idol Star Seeker		Puzzle	G.Rev	NAOMI	Yes		
2001	Virtua Golf		Sports	Sega (WOW Entertainment)	NAOMI	Yes	Yes	
2001	Gun Survivor 2: Biohazard CODE:Veronica		Light gun shooter	Capcom	NAOMI	Yes	Yes	
2001	Heavy Metal Geomatrix		Fighting	Capcom	NAOMI	Yes	Yes	
2001	Inu no Osanpo		Simulation	Sega (WOW Entertainment), Cave	NAOMI	Yes		
2001	Ikaruga		Shoot' em-up	Treasure	NAOMI	Yes		
2001	Kidou Senshi Gundam: Renpou vs. Zeon	Kidou Senshi Gundam: Renpou vs. Zeon DX	Action	Capcom	NAOMI	Yes		
2001	La Keyboard		Edutainment, Puzzle	Sega (Sega Rosso), G.Rev	NAOMI	Yes		
2001	Lupin III: The Shooting		Light gun shooter	Sega (WOW Entertainment)	NAOMI	Yes		
2001	Monkey Ball		Platform	Sega (Amusement Vision	NAOMI	Yes	Yes	
2001	Spikers Battle		Action	Sega (Amusement Vision	NAOMI	Yes	Yes	
2001	Street Fighter Zero 3 Upper		Fighting	Capcom	NAOMI	Yes		
2001	WaveRunner GP		Racing	CRI	NAOMI	Yes	Yes	
2001	Virtua Fighter 4	Virtua Fighter 4: Evolution, Virtua Fighter 4: Final Tuned	Fighting	Sega (AM2)	NAOMI 2	Yes	Yes	
2001	Virtua Striker 3		Sports	Sega (Amusement Vision)	NAOMI 2	Yes	Yes	
2001	Wild Riders		Racing	Sega (Wow Entertainment)	NAOMI 2	Yes	Yes	
2001	World Series Baseball		Sports	Sega (Wow Entertainment)	NAOMI 2	Yes	Yes	
2001	Zero Gunner 2		Shoot' em-up	Psykio	NAOMI	Yes	Yes	
2002	Azumanga Daioh Puzzle Bobble		Puzzle	Taito	NAOMI	Yes		
2002	Cleopatra Fortune Plus		Puzzle	Taito	NAOMI	Yes		
2002	Guilty Gear XX		Fighting	Arc System Works	NAOMI	Yes		
2002	Initial D Arcade Stage	Initial D Arcade Stage 2, Initial D Arcade Stage 3	Racing	Sega (Sega Rosso)	NAOMI 2	Yes	Yes	
2002	Lupin III: The Typing		Edutainment	Sega (WOW Entertainment)	NAOMI	Yes		
2002	Moeru Casinyo		Tabletop	Altron	NAOMI	Yes		
2002	Sega Driving Simulator		Simulation	Sega	NAOMI 2	Yes		
2002	Sega Network Taisen Mahjong MJ		Tabletop	Sega (AM2)	NAOMI	Yes		
2002	Soul Surfer		Simulator	Sega (Sega Rosso)	NAOMI 2	Yes	Yes	
2002	Shootout Pool		Sports, Simulator	Sega	NAOMI	Yes	Yes	
2002	The King of Route 66		Driving	Sega (AM2)	NAOMI 2	Yes	Yes	
2002	The Maze of the Kings		Light gun shooter	Sega (Hitmaker)	NAOMI	Yes		
2002	World Club Champion Football Serie A 2001-2002	World Club Champion Football Serie A 2002-2003, World Club Champion Football European Clubs 2004-2005	CCG, Sports, Simulation	Sega (Hitmaker)	NAOMI	Yes		
2003	Border Down		Shoot' em-up	G.Rev	NAOMI	Yes		
2003	Demolish Fist		Action	Sammy, Dimps	Atomiswave	Yes		
2003	Dolphin Blue		Shoot' em-up	Sammy	Atomiswave	Yes		
2003	Guilty Gear Isuka	Guilty Gear X Ver. 1.5	Fighting	Arc System Works	Atomiswave	Yes		
2003	Guilty Gear XX Reload		Fighting	Arc System Works	NAOMI	Yes		
2003	Knights of Valour: The Seven Spirits		Action	Sammy, International Games System	Atomiswave	Yes		
2003	Maximum Speed		Racing	Sammy, Dimps	Atomiswave		Yes	
2003	Mushiking: The King of Beetles		CCG, Kids	Sega (Mirai R&D)	NAOMI	Yes	Yes	
2003	Psyvariar 2: The Will To Fabricate		Shoot' em-up	Success	NAOMI	Yes		
2003	Puyo Pop Fever		Puzzle	Sega (Sonic Team)	NAOMI	Yes		
2003	Quiz Keitai Q mode		Puzzle	Taito	NAOMI	Yes		
2003	Sports Shooting USA		Light gun shooter	Sammy	NAOMI		Yes	
2003	Shikigami no Shiro II		Shoot' em-up	Alfa System	NAOMI	Yes		
2003	Sushi Bar		Puzzle	Sammy	Atomiswave	Yes		
2003	The King of Fighters Neowave		Fighting	Sammy, SNK Playmore	Atomiswave	Yes		
2003	The Rumble Fish	The Rumble Fish 2	Fighting	Sammy, Dimps	Atomiswave	Yes		
2003	Usagi: Yasei no Touhai: Yamashiro Mahjong Hen		Tabletop	Sammy	NAOMI	Yes		
2004	Chaos Field		Shoot' em-up	Milestone	NAOMI	Yes		
2004	Dirty Pigskin Football		Sports	Sammy	Atomiswave		Yes	
2004	Faster than Speed		Racing	Sammy	Atomiswave		Yes	
2004	Netselect Salaryman Kintarou		Tabletop	Sammy	Atomiswave	Yes		
2004	Ranger Mission		Light gun shooter	Sammy	Atomiswave		Yes	
2004	Tetris Kiwamemichi		Puzzle	Success	NAOMI	Yes		
2004	Trizeal		Shoot' em-up	Triangle Service	NAOMI	Yes		
2004	Oshare Majo: Love and Berry		CCG, Rhythm, Kids	Sega (Mirai R&D)	System SP	Yes	Yes	
2005	Animal Basket		Action	Sammy, Moss	Atomiswave	Yes		
2005	Dinosaur King		CCG, Kids	Sega (AM3)	System SP	Yes	Yes	
2005	Extreme Hunting		Light gun shooter	Sega Amusements USA	Atomiswave		Yes	
2005	ExZeus		Shoot' em-up	Taito	NAOMI	Yes	Yes	
2005	Fist of the North Star		Fighting	Arc System Works	Atomiswave	Yes		
2005	Kochoja Mushiking Popo no Boken-hen		CCG, Kids	Sega	NAOMI	Yes		
2005	Melty Blood: Act Cadenza	Melty Blood: Act Cadenza Version B	Fighting	Ecole	NAOMI	Yes		
2005	NeoGeo Battle Coliseum		Fighting	SNK	NAOMI	Yes		
2005	Radirgy		Shoot' em-up	Milestone	NAOMI	Yes		
2005	Senko no Ronde		Action	G.Rev	NAOMI	Yes		
2005	Super Shanghai 2005		Tabletop	Starfish	NAOMI	Yes		
2005	The King of Fighters XI		Fighting	SNK Playmore	Atomiswave	Yes		
2005	Under Defeat		Shoot' em-up	G.Rev	NAOMI	Yes		
2006	Extreme Hunting 2		Light gun shooter	Sega	Atomiswave		Yes	
2006	Kuru Kuru Chameleon		Puzzle	Starfish	NAOMI	Yes		
2006	Metal Slug 6		Action	SNK	Atomiswave	Yes		
2006	Noukone Puzzle Takoron		Puzzle	Compile Heart	NAOMI	Yes		
2006	Jingi Storm: The Arcade		Fighting	Altravia Japan	NAOMI	Yes		
2006	Karous		Shoot' em-up	Milestone	NAOMI	Yes		
2006	Senko no Ronde SP		Action	G.Rev	NAOMI	Yes		
2006	Trigger Heart Exelica (Warashi)		Shoot' em-up	Warashi	NAOMI	Yes		
2006	Touch De Zunou		Puzzle	Sega	NAOMI	Yes		
2007	Dynamite Deka EX		Action	Sega	NAOMI	Yes		
2007	Guilty Gear XX Accent Core		Fighting	Arc System Works	NAOMI	Yes		
2007	King of Beetle: Battle Terminal		CCG, Kids	Sega	NAOMI	Yes		
2007	Issyo ni Wanwan		CCG, Driving, Kids	Sega	NAOMI	Yes		
2007	Manic Panic Ghost		Action, Light gun shooter	Sega (AM3)	NAOMI	Yes	Yes	
2007	Rhythm Tengoku		Rhythm	Sega (AM2)	NAOMI	Yes		
2007	Shooting Love. 2007		Shoot' em-up	Triangle Service	NAOMI	Yes		
2008	Akatsuki Blitzkampf Ausf.Achse		Fighting	Subtle Style	NAOMI	Yes		
2008	Beetle DASH!		CCG	Sega	System SP	Yes		
2008	Disney Magical Dance		CCG, Rhythm, Kids	Sega	System SP	Yes		
2008	Issyo ni Turbo Drive		CCG, Driving, Kids	Sega	System SP	Yes		
2008	Illmatic Envelope		Shoot' em-up	Milestone	NAOMI	Yes		
2008	Marine & Marine		CCG, Kids	Sega	SystemSP	Yes		
2008	Mamoru-kun wa Norowarete Shimatta!		Shoot' em-up	G.Rev	NAOMI	Yes		
2008	Melty Blood: Actress Again		Fighting	French Bread	NAOMI	Yes		
2008	Sega Clay Challenge		Light gun shooter	Sega	Atomiswave		Yes	
2009	Brick People		Puzzle	Sega	System SP	Yes	Yes	
2009	Future Police Patrol Chase		CCG, Driving, Kids	Sega	System SP	Yes		
2009	Tetris Giant		Puzzle	Sega	System SP	Yes	Yes	
2009	Radirgy Noa		Shoot' em-up	Milestone	NAOMI	Yes		
2009	Sega Bass Fishing Challenge		Simulation	Sega	Atomiswave		Yes	

=== PlayStation 2-based ===
Every game listed here was released in Japan.

Year	Title	Genre(s)	Developer(s)	Arcade system	Exported	Ref
2001	Vampire Night	Light gun shooter	Namco, Sega (WOW Entertainment)	Namco System 246	Yes	

=== Xbox-based ===
Every game listed here was released in Japan.

Year	Title	Updates/Versions	Genre(s)	Developer(s)	Arcade system	Exported	Ref
2002	The House of the Dead III		Light gun shooter	Sega (WOW Entertainment)	Chihiro	Yes	
2003	Crazy Taxi 3: High Roller		Driving	Sega (Hitmaker)	Chihiro	Yes	
2003	OutRun 2	OutRun 2 SP	Racing	Sega (AM2)	Chihiro	Yes	
2003	Sega Network Taisen Mahjong MJ2	Sega Network Taisen Mahjong MJ3, Sega Network Taisen Mahjong MJ3 Evo	Tabletop	Sega (AM2)	Chihiro		
2003	Wangan Midnight Maximum Tune		Racing	Namco	Chihiro		
2003	Virtua Cop 3		Light gun shooter	Sega (AM2)	Chihiro	Yes	
2004	Ghost Squad		Light gun shooter	Sega (AM2)	Chihiro		
2004	Ollie King		Racing	Sega (Amusement Vision)	Chihiro	Yes	
2004	Quest of D	Quest of D Ver. 2.0: Gofu no Keisyousya, Quest of D Ver 3.0: Oukoku no Syugosya, Quest of D: The Battle Kingdom	Action RPG, CCG	Sega (AM2)	Chihiro	Yes	
2004	Sega Golf Club	Sega Golf Club Ver. 2006	Sports	Sega (AM2)	Chihiro		
2004	Wangan Midnight Maximum Tune 2		Racing	Namco	Chihiro		
2005	Gundam Battle Operating Simulator		Simulator	Banpresto	Chihiro		
2005	Mobile Suit Gundam 0079 Card Builder	Mobile Suit Gundam 0083 Card Builder	CCG, Strategy	Sega (AM3), Banpresto	Chihiro		
2005	Sangokushi Taisen	Sangokushi Taisen: Ryusei no Urakami, Sangokushi Taisen 2, Sangokushi Taisen 2: Wakakishishi no Kodou	CCG, Strategy	Sega (AM1)	Chihiro		

=== GameCube-based ===
Every game listed here was released in Japan.

Year	Title	Updates/Versions	Genre(s)	Developer(s)	Exported	Arcade system	Ref
2002	Virtua Striker 2002		Sports	Sega (Amusement Vision)	Yes	Triforce	
2003	F-Zero AX		Racing	Sega (Amusement Vision)	Yes	Triforce	
2003	Gekitou Pro Yakyuu		Sports	Sega (WOW Entertainment)		Triforce	
2003	Avalon no Kagi: The Wizard Master	Avalon no Kagi 2: Eutaxy Commandment, Avalon no Kagi 2.5: War of the Key	CCG, Strategy	Sega (Hitmaker)		Triforce	
2004	Virtua Striker 4	Virtua Striker 4 Ver. 2006	Sports	Sega	Yes	Triforce	
2005	Mario Kart Arcade GP	Mario Kart Arcade GP 2	Racing	Namco	Yes	Triforce	

=== Personal computer (x86)-based ===
Year	Title	Updates/Versions	Genre(s)	Developer(s)	Arcade system	JP	WW	Ref
2005	The House of the Dead 4		Light gun shooter	Sega (AM1)	Lindbergh Yellow	Yes	Yes	
2006	After Burner Climax		Rail shooter	Sega (AM2)	Lindbergh Yellow	Yes	Yes	
2006	Ford Racing: Full Blown		Racing	Razorworks	Lindbergh Blue		Yes	
2006	Let's Go Jungle!: Lost on the Island of Spice		Light gun shooter	Sega	Lindbergh Yellow	Yes		
2006	OutRun 2 SP SDX		Driving	Sega, Polygon Magic	Lindbergh Yellow	Yes	Yes	
2006	Virtua Fighter 5	Virtua Fighter 5 Ver. B, Virtua Fighter 5 Ver. C, Virtua Fighter 5 R Version A, Virtua Fighter 5 R Version B, Virtua Fighter 5 R Version C, Virtua Fighter 5 Final Showdown Version A, Virtua Fighter 5 Final Showdown Version B	Fighting	Sega (AM2)	Lindbergh Yellow	Yes	Yes	
2006	Virtua Tennis 3		Sports	Sega (AM3)	Lindbergh Yellow	Yes	Yes	
2007	2 SPICY		Light gun shooter	Sega (AM1)	Lindbergh Red	Yes	Yes	
2007	Ghost Squad Evolution		Light gun shooter	Sega (AM2)	Lindbergh Red	Yes	Yes	
2007	Network Taisen Quiz Answer X Answer	Network Taisen Quiz Answer X Answer 2, Network Taisen Quiz Answer X Answer Live	Puzzle	Sega (AM1)	Lindbergh Red	Yes		
2007	Initial D Arcade Stage 4	Initial D Arcade Stage 5	Racing	Sega (AM3)	Lindbergh Yellow	Yes	Yes	
2007	Sangokushi Taisen 3	Sangokushi Taisen 3: Soten no Ryu Myaken, Sangokushi Taisen 3: Takeki Houou no Tenshou, Sangokushi Taisen 3: War Begins	CCG, Strategy	Sega (AM1)	Lindbergh Yellow	Yes		
2008	Derby Owners Club 2008: Feel the Rush	Derby Owners Club 2009: Ride for the Live	Simulation	Sega (AM3)	Lindbergh Blue	Yes		
2008	Harley-Davidson: King of the Road		Racing	Sega (AM1)	Lindbergh Red	Yes	Yes	
2008	Hummer	Hummer Extreme Edition	Racing	Sega	Lindbergh Yellow	Yes	Yes	
2008	Primeval Hunt		Light gun shooter	Sega, Polygon Magic	Lindbergh Red		Yes	
2008	RAMBO		Light gun shooter	Sega (AM1)	Lindbergh Red	Yes	Yes	
2008	R-Tuned: Ultimate Street Racing		Racing	Sega (AM2)	Lindbergh Yellow	Yes	Yes	
2008	Sega Network Taisen Mahjong MJ4		Tabletop	Sega (AM2)	Lindbergh Red	Yes		
2008	Sega Race TV		Racing	Sega (AM+)	Lindbergh Yellow	Yes	Yes	
2008	Sega Rally 3		Racing	Sega Racing Studio	Europa-R	Yes	Yes	
2008	The Loving Deads: The House of the Dead EX		Light gun shooter	Sega (AM1), Sega Shanghai Studio	Lindbergh Red	Yes		
2008	World Club Champion Football Intercontinental Clubs 2006-2007	World Club Champion Football Intercontinental Clubs 2007-2008, World Club Champion Football Intercontinental Clubs 2008-2009, World Club Champion Football Intercontinental Clubs 2009-2010	CCG, Sports, Simulation	Sega (AM3)	Lindbergh Blue	Yes		
2009	Border Break	Border Break Airburst, Border Break Union, Border Break Scramble, Border Break X, Border Break X Zero	TPS	Sega (AM2)	RingEdge	Yes		
2009	Ciao Manga Station		CCG, Kids	Sega	Unknown (Arcade Hardware)	Yes		
2009	Rekishi Taisen Gettenka		CCG, Kids	Sega	RingWide	Yes		
2009	Shining Force Cross	Shining Force Cross Raid, Shining Force Cross Elysion, Shining Force Cross Exlesia, Shining Force Cross Exlesia Zenith	Action RPG	Sega (AM2)	RingEdge	Yes		
2009	Lil Puritsu Bipuruhime Chen Yu!		CCG, Kids	Sega	RingWide	Yes		
2010	Bakugan: The Batters		Action, CCG, Kids	Sega	RingWide	Yes		
2010	Hatsune Miku: Project DIVA Arcade		Rhythm	Sega (AM2)	RingeEdge	Yes		
2010	Race Driver: GRID		Racing	Sega, Amusements Europe, Codemasters	Europa-R		Yes	
2010	Let's Go Bus		Edutainment, Kids	Sega	RingWide	Yes	Yes	
2010	Sengoku Taisen: 1560 Owari no Fuuunji	Sengoku Taisen: 1560 Owari no, Sengoku Taisen: 1582 Nichirin, Honnouji Yori Izuru, Sengoku Taisen: 15XX Gokishichidou no Yuu, Sengoku Taisen: 1477 Yabu Fu, Rokujuurokushuu no Kakera e, Sengoku Taisen: 1600 Sekigahara Jo no Fuseki, Aoi Utsu, Sengoku Taisen: 1477-1655 Hinomoto Itto Eno Gunki	CCG, Strategy	Sega (AM1)	RingEdge	Yes		
2010	Sega Racing Classic		Racing	Sega (AM2)	RingWide		Yes	
2010	Transformers The Animated: Shooting		CCG, Light gun shooter, Kids	Sega	RingWide	Yes		
2011	Initial D Arcade Stage 6AA	Initial D Arcade Stage 7 AA X, Initial D Arcade Stage 8 Infinity	Racing	Sega (AM1)	RingEdge	Yes		
2011	Let's Go Island 3D	Let's Go Island: Lost on the Island of Topics, Let's Go Island: Dreams Edition	Light gun shooter	Sega	RingEdge	Yes	Yes	
2011	Sega Network Taisen Mahjong MJ5	Sega Network Taisen Mahjong MJ5R	Tabletop	Sega (AM2)	RingEdge	Yes		
2011	Sega Golden Gun		Light gun shooter	Sega Shanghai Studio	RingWide		Yes	
2011	Sonic & Sega All-Stars Racing		Racing	Sumo Digital	RingWide		Yes	
2011	Super Monkey Ball: Ticket Blitz		Action, Puzzle, Redemption	Sega	RingWide		Yes	
2011	Operation G.H.O.S.T	Target Bravo: Operation G.H.O.S.T.	Rail Shooter	Sega (AM1)	RingWide	Yes	Yes	
2011	Virtua Tennis 4		Sports	Sega	RingEdge		Yes	
2011	World Club Champion Football Intercontinental Clubs 2010-2011	World Club Champion Football Intercontinental Clubs 2011-2012, World Club Champion Football Intercontinental Clubs 2012-2013, World Club Champion Football Intercontinental Clubs 2014-2015, World Club Champion Football Intercontinental Clubs 2015-2016, World Club Champion Football Intercontinental Clubs 2016-2017, World Club Champion Football Intercontinental Clubs 2017-2018	CCG, Sports, Simulation	Sega AM1	RingEdge	Yes		
2012	Dream Raiders		Rail Shooter	Sega Amusements Europe, Gamewax	RingWide		Yes	
2012	Maimai	Maimai PLUS, Maimai GReeN, Maimai GReeN PLUS, Maimai ORANGE, Maimai ORANGE PLUS, Maimai PiNK, Maimai PiNK PLUS, Maimai MURASAKi, Maimai MURASAKi PLUS, Maimai MiLK, Maimai MiLK PLUS, Maimai FiNALE	Rhythm	Sega (AM1)	RingEdge 2	Yes		
2012	REC CHECK GOLF		Sports	Sega (AM1)	RingEdge	Yes		
2012	Sega Card-Gen MLB 2012	Sega Card-Gen MLB 2013	CCG, Sports	Sega	RingEdge	Yes		
2013	Code of Joker	Code of Joker Ver. 1.1 Arukana no Kakusei, Code of Joker Ver.1.2 Re:BIRTH, Code of Joker Ver.1.3 begiNNing, Code of Joker Ver.1.4 GroW=Win, Code of Joker Ver.1.4 GroW=Win, Code of Joker Ver.2 S, Code of Joker Ver.2.1 EDGE, Code of Joker Ver.2.2 ECHOES, Code of Joker Ver.2.3 THE AGENTS	CCG, Strategy	Sega (AM1)	RingEdge 2	Yes		
2013	Puyo Puyo!! Quest Arcade		Puzzle	Sega (AM1)	RingEdge 2	Yes		
2013	Zukannotamago		CCG, Educational, Kids	Sega	RingWide	Yes		
2014	Dirt: Showdown		Racing	Codemasters	RingEdge 2		Yes	
2014	E-DEL Sand		Non-game, Kids	Sega	RingEdge 2	Yes		
2014	Hatsune Miku Project DIVA Future Tone		Rhythm	Sega (AM2)	Nu	Yes		
2014	Hero Bank Arcade		CCG, Kids	Sega	Nu SX	Yes		
2014	Nail Puri		Non-game	Sega (AM1)	Nu SX	Yes		
2014	Plants vs. Zombies: The Last Stand		Light gun shooter	Sega Amusements Europe	RingWide		Yes	
2014	Transformers: Human Alliance		Rail shooter	Sega Shanghai Studio	RingEdge 2	Yes	Yes	
2014	Uranai Torotte		Non-game	Sega	Nu SX	Yes		
2014	Unochalle		Edutainment, Kids	Sega	RingWide	Yes		
2015	CROSS×BEATS REV.		Rhythm	Capcom	Nu 1.1	Yes		
2015	Chunithm	Chunithm Plus, Chunithm Air, Chunithm Air Plus, Chunithm Star, Chunithm Amazon, Chunithm Amazon Plus, Chunithm Crystal, Chunithm Crystal Plus, Chunithm Paradise, Chunithm Paradise Lost	Rhythm	Sega (AM1)	Nu 1.1	Yes		
2015	Shin Kouchuu Ouja Mushiking		CCG, Kids	Sega (AM1)	Nu SX	Yes		
2015	Sonic Dash Extreme		Endless Runner	Sega Amusements Europe, Sega Studios Shanghai	Nu SX		Yes	
2015	Wonderland Wars	Wonderland Wars: Gekka no Waltz, Wonderland Wars: Mezameshi Sousei no Battle Opera, Wonderland Wars: Nanatsu Iro no Romance, Wonderland Wars: Magatsu Yamato no Nakushatra	Strategy	Sega (AM1)	Nu	Yes		
2016	Kancolle Arcade		Action, CCG	Sega (AM2)	Nu 1.1	Yes		
2016	Luigi's Mansion: ARCADE		Rail shooter	Capcom	Nu 1.1	Yes	Yes	
2016	Mario & Sonic at the Rio 2016 Olympic Games ARCADE EDITION		Sports	Sega (AM1)	Nu 1.1	Yes	Yes	
2016	Rakugaki Kado Batoru Gekitsuiou		Action, CCG, Kids	Sega, Coconoe	Nu SX 1.1	Yes		
2016	Sangokushi Taisen 4	Sangokushi Taisen: Tensou no Kyoumei, Sangokushi Taisen: Rousyu no Souken, Sangokushi Taisen: Densyou no Koukyu, Sangokushi Taisen: Gyoukou Seizyun o terashi, Sangokushi Taisen: Kessen no Sora, Kousen no Kaze	CCG, Strategy	Sega (AM1)	Nu 2	Yes		
2017	Daytona Championship USA	Daytona Championship USA: New Season Edition	Racing	Sega Amusements International, Sega Shanghai Studio	Unknown	Yes		
2017	Initial D Arcade Stage ZERO		Racing	Sega (AM1)	Nu 2	Yes		
2017	Sega Network Taisen Mahjong MJ Arcade		Tabletop	Sega (AM2)	RingEdge	Yes		
2018	Fate/Grand Order Arcade		Action, CCG	Sega (AM2)	ALLS UX	Yes		
2018	House of the Dead: Scarlet Dawn		Rail shooter	Sega (AM1)	ALLS UX	Yes	Yes	
2018	ONGEKI	ONGEKI Plus, ONGEKI Summer, Ongeki Summer Plus, ONGEKI Red, ONGEKI Red Plus, ONGEKI bright, ONGEKI bright MEMORY, ONGEKI Re:Fresh	CCG, Rhythm	Sega (AM1)	ALLS HX	Yes		
2018	SOUL REVERSE		Action RPG	Sega (AM2)	ALLS UX	Yes		
2018	SEGA World Drivers Championship	SEGA World Drivers Championship 2019	Racing	Sega (AM1)	ALLS UX	Yes		
2018	Transformers: Shadows Rising		Rail shooter	Sega Amusements International, Sega Shanghai Studio	ALLS UX		Yes	
2019	ATV Slam	ATV Slam DLX	Racing	Sega Amusements International, 3MindWave	ALLS UX		Yes	
2019	Chrono Regalia	Chrono Regalia EX	CCG, Strategy	Sega	ALLS UX	Yes		
2019	Kemono Friends 3		Action, CCG	Sega	Nu SX	Yes		
2019	Maimai DX	Maimai DX PLUS, Maimai DX Splash, Maimai DX Splash PLUS, Maimai DX UNiVERSE, Maimai DX UNiVERSE PLUS, Maimai DX FESTiVAL, Maimai DX FESTiVAL PLUS, Maimai DX BUDDiES, Maimai DX BUDDiES Plus, Maimai DX PRiSM, Maimai DX PRiSM Plus, Maimai DX CiRCLE	Rhythm	Sega	ALLS UX	Yes	Yes	
2019	WACCA	WACCA S, WACCA Lily, WACCA Lily R, WACCA Reverse	Rhythm	Marvelous	ALLS HX	Yes		
2019	WCCF FOOTISTA 2019	WCCF FOOTISTA 2020, WCCF FOOTISTA 2021	CCG, Sports, Simulation	Sega	ALLS UX	Yes		
2020	Mario & Sonic at Olympic Games Tokyo 2020		Sports	Sega	ALLS UX	Yes	Yes	
2021	Initial D The Arcade	Initial D The Arcade ver.2, Initial D The Arcade ver.3, Initial D The Arcade ver.4	Racing	Sega	ALLS UX	Yes		
2021	Mission Impossible: Arcade		Rail shooter	Sega Amusements International, Sega Shanghai Studio	ALLS		Yes	
2021	Chunithm New	Chunithm New Plus, Chunithm Sun, Chunithm Sun Plus, Chunithm Luminous, Chunithm Luminous Plus, Chunithm Verse, Chunithm XVerse, Chunithm XVerseX	Rhythm	Sega	ALLS HX	Yes		
2022	Drone Racing Genesis		Racing	Sega Amusements International, Bitster	Unknown		Yes	
2022	Eiketsu Taisen	Eiketsu Taisen: Kaiten no Gobōsei	CCG, Strategy	Sega	ALLS UX	Yes		
2023	Jumanji		Redemption	Sega Amusements International	Unknown		Yes	
2023	VR Agent		Shooter	Sega Amusements International, 3MindWave	Unknown		Yes	
2023	Zombies Ready Deady Go!		Redemption	Sega Amusements International	Unknown		Yes	
2024	Apex Rebels		Racing	Sega Amusements International, 3MindWave	Unknown		Yes	
2025	Paw Patrol Chase to Issho		CCG	Sega	Unknown		Yes	

=== ALL.Net P-ras MULTI ===
The ALL.Net game download service is only available in Japan.

Year	Title	Updates/Versions	Genre(s)	Developer(s)	Arcade system	Ref
2010	Melty Blood Actress Again Current Code		Fighting	French Bread, Type Moon	RingWide	
2011	Under Night In-Birth	Under Night In-Birth Exe:Late	Fighting	Arc System Works	RingEdge 2	
2012	Geisen Love.: Plus Pengo!		Compilation	Triangle Service	RingEdge 2	
2012	Guilty Gear XX Accent Core Plus R		Fighting	Arc System Works	RingEdge 2	
2013	Caladrius AC		Shoot' em up	MOSS	RingEdge 2	
2013	Dead or Alive 5 Ultimate: Arcade		Fighting	Team Ninja	RingEdge 2	
2013	Phantom Breaker: Another Code		Fighting	5pb.	RingEdge	
2013	Under Defeat HD +		Shoot' em up	G.Rev	RingEdge 2	
2014	Dengeki Bunko: Fighting Climax	Dengeki Bunko: Fighting Climax Ignition	Fighting	French Bread	RingEdge 2	
2014	Guilty Gear Xrd: SIGN	Guilty Gear Xrd: SIGN Relevator, Guilty Gear Xrd: SIGN Rev. 2	Fighting	Arc System Works	RingEdge 2	
2014	Koihime Enbu		Fighting	BaseSon	RingEdge 2	
2015	Blade Arcus from Shining		Fighting	Studio Saizensen	RingEdge 2	
2018	Blade Strangers		Fighting	Studio Saizensen	Unknown	
2019	BlazBlue: Cross Tag Battle		Fighting	Arc System Works	ALLS UX	
2019	Dead or Alive 6		Fighting	Team Ninja	ALLS UX	
2019	Puyo Puyo eSports Arcade		Puzzle	Sega	ALLS UX	
2019	Tapping Skill Test		Compilation	Triangle Service	ALLS UX	
2020	Goonya Fighter		Fighting	Mutan	ALLS UX	
2020	Pengo! Online!		Puzzle	Triangle Service	ALLS UX	
2020	Rolling Gunner		Shoot' em up	Mebius	ALLS UX	
2020	Otoshoo DX		Shoot' em up	EZDAEMON	ALLS UX	
2020	Umihara Kawase		Action	Studio Saizensen	ALLS UX	
2021	Cotton Rock'n Roll		Shoot em' up	Success, Studio Saizensen	ALLS UX	
2021	Guilty Gear Strive		Fighting	Arc System Works	ALLS UX	
2021	Kashiori		Puzzle	Success	ALLS UX	
2021	Nosferatu Lilinor		Action	Neon	ALLS UX	
2021	Virtua Fighter e-sports		Fighting	Sega (AM2, Ryu Ga Gotoku Studio)	ALLS UX	
2021	Senjin Aleste		Shoot em' up	M2	ALLS UX	
2022	Milk-Chan		Action	Studio Saizensen	ALLS UX	
2023	Shanghai IV		Tabletop	Success	ALLS UX	
2023	Virtua Fighter 3tb Online		Fighting	Sega (AM2)	ALLS UX	

== Medal games ==
Medal games are only released in Japan.

Year	Title	Genre(s)	Updates/Versions	Developer(s)	Arcade systems/Consoles	Ref(s)
1974	Harness Racing	Harness racing		Sega	Unknown	
1986	World Bingo	Bingo game		Sega	Unknown	
1988	World Derby	Horse racing		Sega	World Derby Board	
1988	Bingo Circus	Bingo game		Sega	Unknown	
1991	Royal Ascot	Horse racing	Royal Ascot 2	Sega	Royal Ascot Board	
1992	Caribbean Boule	Roulette		Sega	X Board	
1992	Bingo Party	Bingo game	Bingo Party Phoenix	Sega	Bingo Party Board	
1994	Super Dice Craps	Craps		Sega	Unknown	
1994	Bingo Party Multicard	Bingo game		Sega	Unknown	
1996	Bingo Fantasy	Bingo game		Sega	Unknown	
1997	Bingo Planet	Bingo game		Sega	G1-MAIN2	
2000	Star Horse	Horse racing	Star Horse 2001	Sega	NAOMI	
2000	Boat Race: Ocean Hearts	Racing		Sega	NAOMI	
2002	Bingo Party Splash	Bingo game		Sega	Unknown	
2003	Dragon Treasure	Role-playing game	Dragon Treasure II, Dragon Treasure III	Sega, Overworks	NAOMI	
2004	Bingo Party Splash SP	Bingo game		Sega	NAOMI	
2005	Star Horse 2	Horse racing	Star Horse 2 Second Fusion, Star Horse 2 Third Evolution, Star Horse 2: Fourth Ambition, Star Horse: Fifth Expansion, Star Horse: Progress Returns	Sega	Lindbergh	
2007	Sega Network Casino Club	Casino game	Sega Network Casino Club Ver. 2, Sega Network Casino Club Ver. 3	Sega	Lindbergh	
2007	Club Majesty	Casino game	Club Majesty: Where is Wally?, Club Majesty: Gatling Poker	Sega	Lindbergh Red	
2007	To Ami-Gyo	Fishing		Sega		
2007	Bingo Galaxy	Bingo game		Sega	Unknown	
2007	Bingo Party Pirates	Bingo game		Sega	Unknown	
2007	Fantasy Arena	Pusher		Sega	Unknown	
2007	Mirage World	Pusher		Sega	Unknown	
2007	Medalink	Pusher		Sega	Unknown	
2008	GALILEO FACTORY	Pusher	GALILEO FACTORY 2, Galileo Factory 3: Planet Zero	Sega	System SP	
2008	Kizzu Yatai Mura Kingyosukui	Kids game		Sega	Unknown	
2008	Blackjack Nailed Ace	Blackjack		Sega	Unknown	
2008	Monopoly: The Medal game	Pusher		Sega	Unknown	
2009	Kizzu Yatai-Mura Shateki	Kids game		Sega	Unknown	
2009	Puyo Puyo Medal Link	Pusher		Sega		
2010	100 & Medal Kazaan!!	Gambling		Sega	System SP	
2010	Arabian Jewel	Pusher		Sega	Unknown	
2010	Ami. No. 3	Pusher		Sega	Lindbergh	
2010	Medal no Gunman	Light gun shooter		Sega	RingWide	
2010	Star Horse 2: Final Destination	Horse racing		Sega	Lindbergh	
2010	Susume! Sugorokettsu	Kids game		Sega	Unknown	
2011	Hako Emaki Manpuku Suizokukan	Kids game		Sega	Unknown	
2011	Kizzu Yatai Mura Kingyosukui Tairyōda Yo! Zenin Shugo	Kids game		Sega	Unknown	
2011	Lady Luck	Gambling		Sega	Unknown	
2011	Star Boat	Racing		Sega	Sega RingEdge	
2011	Star Horse 3	Horse racing	StarHorse 3 Season I: A New Legend Begins, StarHorse 3 Season II: Blaze of Glory, StarHorse 3 Season III: Chase the Wind, StarHorse 3 Season IV: Dream on the Turf, StarHorse 3 Season V: Exceed the Limit, StarHorse 3 Season VI: Full Throttle, StarHorse 3 Season VII: Great Journey	Sega	Sega RingEdge 2	
2011	THAT'S PARADICE	Dice game		Sega	Unkwnown	
2012	100 & Medal Geki Kazaan!!	Gambling	100 & Medal Hyozaan!!,100 & Medal Gingaan!!	Sega	RingWide	
2012	Medal de Fantasy Zone	Kids game		Sega		
2012	Medaru Senshi Butsukerunja	Shooting		Sega	Unknown	
2013	Fist of the North Star: Battle Medal	Gambling		Sega	Unknown	
2014	Kizzu Wan Paku Mura	Kids game		Sega	Unknown	
2014	The World of Three Kingdoms	Action RPG		Sega	Unknown	
2016	The Medal Tower of Babel	Pusher	The Medal Tower of Babel W!	Sega	Unknown	
2018	Reddzuri GO!	Pusher	Gaddzuri GO!	Sega	Unknown	
2019	Star Horse 4	Horse racing		Sega	Unknown	
2022	Pokémon Corogarena	Action		Sega	Unknown	
2023	Bingo Theater	Pusher		Sega	Unknown	
2023	Hori A Tale	Pusher		Sega	Unknown	
2024	Jackpot Circus	Pusher		Sega	Unknown	

== See also ==
- Lists of Sega games
- List of Sega Master System games
- List of Sega Mega Drive and Sega Genesis games
- List of Game Gear games
- List of Sega Mega-CD games
- List of Sega 32X games
- List of Sega Saturn games
- List of Dreamcast games
