= Sangokushi Taisen =

- Developers: Sega AM1; Gamecyber Technology Limited (PC)
- Publishers: Sega; Gamecyber Technology Limited (PC)
- Producers: Yasuhiro Nishiyama; Atsushi Seimiya
- Composers: Susumu Tsugakoshi; Tomonori Sawada
- Platforms: Arcade, Nintendo DS, PC
- Release: Arcade; 2005 (1.0); 2006 (2.0); 2007 (3.0); 2010 (3.59 WAR BEGINS, Sengoku Taisen); 2016 (Sangokushi Taisen 4); 2022 (Eiketsu Taisen); Nintendo DS; 2007; 2008 (Ten); PC; 2011
- Genres: Real-time strategy, collectible card game
- Modes: Single-player, multiplayer
- Arcade system: Sega Nu2, Sega RingEdge, Sega Lindbergh, Sega Chihiro

Sangokushi Taisen (Japanese: 三国志大戦) is a hybrid physical and digital collectible card game for the arcade, on the Chihiro arcade board. It is a real-time strategy-based game set in the Three Kingdoms period of Chinese history and the 14th century Chinese novel Romance of the Three Kingdoms by Luo Guanzhong. It uses the same housing as World Club Champion Football, with a sensitive playing area that can detect the position of the physical cards. Over 500 million trading cards have been shipped. It is the sixth trading card arcade game by Sega, following World Club Champion Football, Mushiking: The King of Beetles, The Key of Avalon, Love and Berry: Dress Up and Dance! and Quest of D.

== Gameplay ==
The game is a hybrid strategy game that blends real-time troop movement with collectible card game mechanics. To begin playing, a user must utilize a proprietary IC Card to store save data and construct a physical deck of warlords from the 2nd Century Three Kingdoms era. Army construction is governed by a point system where a deck cannot exceed eight points total. Each individual card has a cost ranging from one to three points, indicated by black dots on the card face, allowing players to field a mix of powerful, high-cost commanders and lower-cost support troops.

The core of the gameplay revolves around a "Rock-Paper-Scissors" combat triangle dictated by the five available unit types. Cavalry units are the fastest on the field and possess a "Rush" ability that deals massive damage if they have enough space to build momentum; they are exceptionally strong against Archers but weak against Spearmen. Spearmen are slow but counter Cavalry effectively; when stationary, they automatically deploy a "Phalanx" or spear wall that deals heavy counter-damage to charging horses, though they are vulnerable to ranged attacks. Archers can attack from a distance, automatically targeting the nearest foe or those in their forward arc, making them ideal for destroying Spearmen but defenseless against a Cavalry charge. Outside of this triangle are Swordsmen, who are neutral with no specific strengths or weaknesses, and Siege units, which are slow but deal high damage if they manage to reach the enemy’s wall.

Matches are played on a flat card reader where the physical position of the card dictates the unit's location on the screen. The primary objective is to maneuver units across the battlefield to attack the enemy’s "wall," which acts like an endzone; damaging the wall requires filling a gauge while in contact with it, with double damage awarded for attacking the central gate. Combat between units is automatic upon contact, with damage calculated based on the card's Strength statistic. Occasionally, melee engagement may trigger a "Duel," a random mini-game where players must time button presses to hit targets on a sliding bar. The loser of a duel is instantly destroyed, regardless of their remaining health.

When a unit is defeated, it enters a "Smashed" state and disappears from the main screen, represented only as a grey card on the minimap. To revive a fallen unit, the player must manually pull the physical card back into their own wall area to begin a recovery timer. This timer generally lasts around 36 seconds, though specific traits or strategies can shorten it. Once the timer expires, the unit respawns with partial health and can be deployed again. This mechanic forces players to physically retreat and manage their bench during the heat of battle.

Beyond physical combat, the game features a magic and skill system divided into "Strategies" and "Tactics." A Strategy is a player-selected spell (such as mass healing or enemy reinforcement slowing) that can be triggered only once per match. Tactics, however, are individual skills tied to specific cards, such as fire attacks, lightning strikes, or dances that buff allies. Using Tactics requires "Orbs," a mana resource that slowly regenerates during the match. The maximum number of Orbs available depends on deck purity; a single-faction deck allows for the maximum of 12 Orbs, while mixing two or more factions reduces this cap significantly, limiting the frequency of special move usage. Finally, cards may possess passive Traits such as "Ambush," which keeps a unit invisible until contact, "Fence," which deploys a physical barrier at the start of the match, or "Resurrection," which drastically reduces the revival timer.

== Version history ==
The first version of Sangokushi Taisen was launched 2005 with a 2.0 version following in 2006 and the 3.0 version releasing in 2007. The 3.0 version was released on the Lindbergh arcade platform, and in addition to being available in Japan, it was also released in Shanghai, Taiwan, South Korea, Hong Kong and Singapore. A version called 3.59 WAR BEGINS launched 2010 and was also a wider Asian release. A completely new game, Sengoku Taisen, was launched 2010, only in Japan. It had a different scenario set in feudal Japan and the arcade platform switched to RingEdge. Sangokushi Taisen 4 launched 2016 on the Nu2 arcade platform, available in Japan & Hong Kong. Eiketsu Taisen, combining both the feudal Japan and Three Kingdoms scenarios, was released in 2022 on the ALLS UX platform.

Outside of the arcade, Sangokushi Taisen DS was published by Sega in 2007 for the Nintendo DS. It was based on version 2.0 of the arcade game. Sangokushi Taisen Ten was based on version 3.0 and released on the following year also for the Nintendo DS. Sangokushi Taisen INFINITY ONLINE was a PC Windows version launched in 2011 by GameCyber Technology Limited in Hong Kong. The Sangokushi Taisen Trading Card Game - based on the game, was released in 2012. The CCG was localized as War of Three Kingdoms: The Card Game.

A blockchain-based version of the game was announced in September 2022, in partnership with developer Double Jump Tokyo.

== Development ==
The producer wanted to develop a game based on the Romance of the Three Kingdoms ever since he joined Sega. By 2003, the situation of arcades changed dramatically with internet connection and IC cards that save progress, and with the addition of flat panel reader of World Club Champion Football, it was decided that now was the right time to launch a game based on the Romance of the Three Kingdoms. Rather than being a grand strategy game like the Koei Tecmo series Romance of the Three Kingdoms or Sega's own Total War, the game's producer compared the game to Virtua Fighter, in the sense that it is competitive fighting game between two players.

== Reception ==
NintendoLife reviewed the Nintendo DS version of the game positively, lamenting the fact that despite the game continued success in arcades, no versions for Wii U or Nintendo 3DS followed. The game was cited as one of the influences for the battle system of Final Fantasy XIII.
