= Dragon Treasure =

2003 Japanese arcade game

- Arcade flyer
- Developers: Overworks; Sega WOW
- Publisher: Sega
- Producer: Yasuhiro Nishiyama
- Composers: Teruhiko Nakagawa; Yutaka Minobe
- Platform: Arcade
- Release: JP: July 2003
- Genres: Medal game, role-playing
- Modes: Single-player, multiplayer
- Arcade system: NAOMI

Dragon Treasure is a 2003 arcade game developed by Overworks and published by Sega in Japan for the Sega NAOMI arcade board. The game is a coin-pusher game combined with a role-playing game, and can be played by multiple people. Progress can be stored on an IC card and can be resumed on any machine, which was new for medal games in Japan at the time. It received two sequels: Dragon Treasure II in 2004 and Dragon Treasure III in 2005.

It was released only in Japanese arcades and received no port of any kind. The official soundtrack was released in 2006.

== Gameplay ==
Dragon Treasure is a coin pusher, where the players receives medals that are pushed off, which are used to progress through the game and level up the character. The game ends when the player runs out of medals. The player starts with 100 medals, and uses them to get more medals through battles, opening treasure chests and participating in roulette wheel and slot machine sequences. Ultimately the goal is to find the dragon treasure.

The second game continues the story and the players play as a merchant that sells the items that players win and determines their score. The game adds new roulette wheel sequences, crystal roulette which is initiated when a crystal appears in a dungeon, and then leads into bonus room where they can win a large amount of items that they can sell. The game also adds three new modes. With short hunt, players with few medals are allowed to play the game for a short time to test the game. The dungeon hunt is for experienced players and medal attack asks them to clear a level within a set time period to win medals. Extra items and weapons have also been added. Dragon Treasure II also allowed the player's score to be uploaded to the official website.

The third game adds more roulettes to increase the chance of winning medals, such as at the end of battles. Also new dungeon mission have been added, which now can be accessed through a world map.

== Development ==
The game's producer Yasuhiro Nishiyama was fond of medal games such as Royal Ascot. Ultimately Nishiyama wanted to surprise people with a game that people would not expect Overworks to make, which is mainly engaged with home console RPG games, such as Sakura Wars and Skies of Arcadia. The ability to save player's progress through an IC card gave them the idea to develop a new type of medal game.

== Reception ==
Dragon Treasure was one of Sega's most successful arcade games in 2003, mentioned alongside The Key of Avalon as a "new product" securing high sales in their financial report.

== See also ==
- Medal game
