= Super Major League =

1995 video game

Super Major League (USA), Final Arch (Japan)
- Developer: Sega
- Publisher: Sega
- Platform: Arcade
- Release: JP: July 14, 1995 (Final Arch), US: January 8, 1996 (Super Major League)
- Genres: Sports (baseball)
- Arcade system: ST-V

Super Major League is a baseball sports video game developed and published by Sega for arcades in 1995. It is a successor to Sega's 1985 arcade baseball game Major League.

== Gameplay ==
Super Major League is a baseball game for the Sega Titan ST-V system.

== Reception ==
In Japan, Game Machine listed Super Major League on their September 1, 1995 issue as being the eighth most-successful arcade game of the month. Next Generation reviewed the arcade version of the game, rating it two stars out of five, and stated that "It's just so far and few between that you'll walk away before sliding another coin into this title."
