= Inu no Osanpo =

2001 simulation video game

- Developers: WOW Entertainment, Cave
- Publisher: Sega
- Release: JP: 2001
- Genre: Simulation
- Mode: Single-player
- Arcade system: Sega NAOMI

Inu no Osanpo (犬のおさんぽ), (lit. "Walk the Dog") is a dog walking simulation game developed by Wow Entertainment and published by Sega for the Sega NAOMI arcade system in 2001. Players "walk" a virtual dog by walking on a treadmill and control the pet with a leash attached to a plastic dog in front of the player. The game was only released in Japan.

== Gameplay ==
Inu no Osanpo simulates the experience of walking a dog. Players first choose one of six breeds of dog to walk: Poodle, Pug, Pembroke Welsh Corgi, Shiba Inu, Labrador Retriever, or Siberian Husky. The difficulty of the game changes depending on the breed of dog chosen. After selecting a dog, the player selects one of three possible walking routes, each with a unique scenario. Route A, intended for beginners, is a walk to the pet store in order to buy dog food. Route B, of intermediate difficulty, is a simulated walk to a field so that the dog can play with a frisbee. Route C, the most difficult path, takes the player through a city on their way home from the dog park.

Once a dog and route have been chosen, the walk begins. The goal of Inu no Osanpo is to maintain the dog's happiness long enough to complete the entire route. This is displayed in-game via a "mood meter" and the presence of musical notes around the dog's head. Players must move the plastic leash-shaped controller to steer their dog away from danger; such as traffic and larger dogs, and towards points of interest such as cats. The player must also avoid garbage and rotten food that is left on the road to prevent the dog from eating it and becoming sick. While the virtual dog is never injured, failure to keep the dog out of danger decreases its mood meter. In addition, players must move at the right pace in order to keep the dog happy. Walking too fast will drag the dog and decrease its mood, but walking too slowly will cause it to become angry and tug at the leash. By doing well, the player can unlock a bonus stage where they must follow their dog as it chases a runaway cat.

The game ends when the chosen route is completed, or when the dog's mood level decreases to zero. After the game ends, the player's score is calculated and the distance walked, amount of movement, and number of calories burned are displayed.

== Reception ==
IGN called the game "odd" and proof that "Sega is absolutely insane".
