= Rough Racer =

1990 video game

- Developer: Sega
- Publisher: Sega
- Platform: Arcade
- Release: JP: February 1990
- Genre: Racing
- Modes: Single-player, multiplayer
- Arcade system: Sega System 24

Rough Racer is a top-down racing game released by Sega in 1990. It was only released in Japan on the Sega System 24 hardware.

== Overview ==
Rough Racer is similar to Atari's Sprint series. The object, like other Sega racing games such as Power Drift and Hot Rod, is to finish in third place or better. The player has the option to continue if he or she finishes behind a computer opponent, who drives a silver car, forcing them to retire.

Like Sprint and Leland's Super Off Road, the player has the option to spend money earned on upgrades for their cars after a race, such as a shield, high-grip tires as well as nitrous—which can be used as a weapon as explained below.

Four cars compete on the track, with an added enemy (known as "Bandit Racers") who is there to sabotage the race and disrupt the progress of the players and computer opponents—usually road equipment. These must be avoided, or can be rammed using nitrous. Causing them to crash will cause them to drop coins. Coins can also be earned by smashing through brick walls that reveal shortcuts in later races. The player can also use nitrous to cause opponents to crash as well. There are 10 tracks, each with their own theme and road conditions.

== Reception ==
In Japan, Game Machine listed Rough Racer on their May 1, 1990 issue as being the tenth most-successful table arcade unit of the month.
