= Sega Ski Super G =

1996 video game

- Publisher: Sega
- Platform: Arcade
- Release: December 1996
- Genre: Skiing game
- Modes: Single player, multiplayer
- Arcade system: Sega Model 2

Sega Ski Super G is a skiing arcade video game released by Sega in 1996. The game was built on the Sega Model 2 arcade hardware.

== Gameplay ==
In Sega Ski Super G, the objective is to race against other opponents under a time limit. The game has two modes: World Series and Time Attack.

== Reception ==
In Japan, Game Machine listed Sega Ski Super G on their February 15, 1997 issue as being the fourth most-successful dedicated arcade game of the month. Next Generation noted that the game's cabinet is physically demanding, particularly because the foot pedals are slanted, requiring players to lean forward, but highly praised the game's sense of speed, pacing, aggressive opponents, rigorous challenge, and varying types of snow. The reviewer compared it favorably to its contemporary competitor, Alpine Racer 2, and gave it four out of five stars.

== Rarity ==
On KLOV.com, Sega Ski Super G is classified as very rare.
