= Avalon no Kagi =

Sega arcade game

The Key of Avalon
- Developer: Hitmaker
- Publisher: Sega
- Composers: Chiho Kobayashi; Taihei Sato
- Release: Arcade: JP: 2003; Avalon no Kagi: Eutaxy Commandment: JP: 2005; Microsoft Windows: JP: 2010
- Genres: Board game, digital collectible card game
- Mode: Multiplayer
- Arcade system: Triforce; Microsoft Windows

Avalon no Kagi, alternatively known as The Key of Avalon is an arcade game developed by Hitmaker and published by Sega on the Triforce arcade board. It is the third card arcade game by Sega, following World Club Champion Football and Mushiking: The King of Beetles. It is a combination of sugoroku style board game and combat trading card game. It was followed by a sequel called The Key of Avalon 2: Eutaxy Commandment which was updated as The Key of Avalon 2.5: War of the Key.

It was often compared to Culdcept, and is able to be played by multiple players at once, using a free in and free out method where other players can drop in and drop out of a match at any time. The cabinet reads a deck of up to 30 cards.

== Gameplay ==
The game is a board game with 4 players, and two roles, divided into one key holder and three chasers. Inserting the deck and the card that saves the players progress, start the game. The key holder has to besiege the towers and open the main castle with his key to win the game. The chasers have to bump into the key holder, and after a battle, transfer the key and reverse the roles. The three chasers and the key holder take turns, with all the three chasers moving at once. Using monster cards makes the character move on the board. From the deck of 30 cards, six cards are allowed to be used in each turn. The cards have attack, defense and movement values and are also categorized in four colors and rarity values. In addition to monster cards, there also support cards for either the monsters or the character. The attack value of the monster card needs to be greater than the defense value to win the battle. Passing certain checkpoints and winning battles increases life points. The life points decrease after each turn.

In total, after all the updates, the game had 295 different cards.

== Development ==
Initially the development team had a hard time conveying the game to arcade owners, as in initial showing at trade shows focused on purely on the cards. Focusing on the board game aspect made it more appealing to arcade owners. The game's customer base was different than many arcade games, as the art on the cards appealed to women and doujinshi artists.

== Reception ==
Avalon no Kagi was one of Sega's most successful arcade games in 2003, mentioned alongside Dragon Treasure as a "new product" securing high sales in their financial report. The game balance was initially poor although improved in later versions. Its popularity decreased after Quest of D and Sangokushi Taisen appeared, which had online features that Avalon no Kagi lacked. Instead of adding online support, it was ported to PC through a licensing agreement with Gamepot, but was negatively received and shut down two years after its 2010 launch.

== Merchandise ==
Books

- Avalon no Kagi Madou Academy Nyuumonsho & Card Complete Guide
- Avalon no Kagi 弐: Madou Academy Nyuumonsho
- Avalon no Kagi Madou Academy Settei Shiryou Visual Fan Book
- Avalon no Kagi 弐 Kagi Seisen Madou no Yoake
- Shousetsu Avalon no Kagi Kusarisa Reta Rakuen

Board game

- Avalon no Kagi Entaku no Shōkan Fu

Soundtrack

- Avalon no Kagi Original Soundtrack: Madou no Symphony
