= Hummer (2009 video game) =

- Developer: Sega
- Platform: Arcade
- Release: 2009
- Genre: Racing game
- Mode: Single-player
- Arcade system: Sega Lindbergh

Hummer is an arcade racing game released by Sega in 2009. The game runs on the Sega Lindbergh platform. There are two game modes: Race Mode and Time Attack Mode. In Race Mode, players choose between 3 Hummers, each with an additional variant, to race against 20 opponents. Two different variants of the cabinet feature two sets of controls side-by-side. This enables co-op play between players on the same cabinet using the "Driver Change System", which swaps the person controlling the vehicle at checkpoints or after collisions. Consequently, it is possible for up to 8 people to race at the same time, if the maximum of four 2-player machines are linked. The game also features a boost meter, which can grant a speed boost when filled. The boost meter is increased by driving through destructible obstacles and landing controlled jumps.
