= Primeval Hunt =

2008 video game

- Brochure cover
- Developer: Sega
- Publisher: Sega
- Platform: Arcade
- Release: Arcade; January 23, 2008
- Genres: Shooter game, Hunting game
- Modes: Single player, multiplayer
- Arcade system: Sega Lindbergh

Primeval Hunt is a shooting arcade game which is developed and published by Sega and runs on their Sega Lindbergh hardware. It comes in both standard and deluxe models, with the deluxe version featuring a 62" HD Screen.

Primeval Hunt is a First-person shooter arcade game developed and published by Sega.

Released for arcades in early 2008, players in the game must hunt 10 species of dinosaurs over 12 levels and 3 Bonus stages using light guns styled after pump action shotguns with speakers mounted for the first time in the 'butt' of each gun. The game also utilizes a unique touch screen interface to give a free-roaming element to the gameplay. It is similar to the Big Buck Hunter arcade games.

The game's 'tag-line' is "Hunt or be hunted"

The Lindbergh system allows for there to be two screens functioning at one time with different content on each screen and different resolutions.

== Gameplay ==
=== Overview ===
Primeval Hunt features 12 levels set on an island filled with Aztec-like ruins, inhabited by several genus of dinosaur from various geological periods (so that dinosaurs that were not alive at the same time in reality interact, similar to Jurassic Park).

Though the game uses two light guns styled after pump-action shotguns, the player may choose from three weapons in-game: a Bow, Shotgun or Rifle (However, each player is also given a Rocket Launcher with one rocket in it for every level that is capable of killing any one Dinosaur with a single shot). Up to two people can play simultaneously with the points for shooting the Dinosaurs awarded to the player responsible for the fatal shot.

In each level, players are required to hunt a set number of dinosaurs with limited ammunition within a particular time frame. All dinosaurs have two weak points which allow one-hit kills, their eye and heart areas, otherwise a number of shots will be required to bring down each creature. Points are awarded for each dinosaur successfully killed, however failure to reach the kill quota within the allotted time or running out of ammunition will cause the player to lose a credit.

As well as each of the target dinosaurs, each level also contains other genus, many of which will attack the player if disturbed (for example, arrows are silent while bullets or shotgun shells are quite loud). These dinosaurs act as obstacles, requiring players to 'waste' ammunition on them. Also, these additional genus, usually predators, will often try to attack the player and if the player is successfully attacked the player will lose a life, represented by a number of hunter caps on the top of the screen. If all caps are depleted, then the player loses a credit. Bonus points are awarded for every one of these Dinosaurs killed.

Points are tallied up at the end of each level, successful completion of which will unlock additional levels. Levels are rated in difficulty using a star system; one star levels are relatively easy, while five star levels are the most difficult.

=== Touch panel ===
The game's touch panel function allows an additional element of free-roaming gameplay as well as the method of firing the rocket launcher weapon.

Located at the front of arcade cabinet, between the two gun racks, the screen displays each stage in a top-down view with small, cartoon-like representations of the 'target dinosaur' (and only the target dinosaur) and the hunter. Players need to simply touch a dinosaur or location to start moving in that direction as the crow flies.

Additionally the player can choose to drag the hunter icon and plot a set path if they wish to avoid forests, open plains or other specific areas on the map.

The hunter's view point can be rotated by touching and dragging the cone of vision around.

=== Bonus stages ===
There are three additional 'bonus stages' in the game, which reward players with additional items if they are completed:

- Egg Robbers Players must stop Oviraptors from stealing Dinosaur eggs.
- Sniper on the Spire Players must snipe as many dinosaurs as possible using the touch screen's zoom function.
- Battalion on the Bridge Players must break down a bridge allowing Velociraptors to attack by shooting out the Bridge's ropes.

== Reception ==
Reception

Review score
Publication	Score
Hardcore Gamer	4.5/5
