= Funky Head Boxers =

1995 video game

- Arcade flyer
- Developers: Sega AM3; Yoshimoto Kogyo (Saturn)
- Publishers: Sega; Yoshimoto Kogyo (Saturn)
- Producer: Hisao Oguchi
- Platforms: Arcade, Sega Saturn
- Release: Arcade: JP: December 1995; Saturn: JP: 10 January 1997
- Genre: Sports (boxing)
- Modes: Single-player, multiplayer
- Arcade system: ST-V

Funky Head Boxers is a 1995 boxing video game developed and published by Sega for arcades and Sega Saturn.

== Gameplay ==
Funky Head Boxers is a boxing game where the boxers have large, boxed-shaped heads.

=== Boxers ===
The game features six boxers from four countries:

- Billy Johnson, from The United States of America,
- Kouji Haneda, from Japan,
- Joseph Davidson, from The United States of America,
- Lightnin' Baron III, from The United Kingdom,
- Jose Alvarez, from Mexico,
- Jack White Jr., from The United States of America

== Reception ==
Next Generation reviewed the arcade version of the game, rating it two stars out of five, and stated: "Funky Head Boxers is one bizarro title. It's a decent game but not impressive, especially for what's hyped as a hot, new arcade system."
