= Love and Berry: Dress Up and Dance! =

2004 video game

- Developer: Sega
- Publisher: Sega
- Composers: Kazuhiko Nagai; Chikako Kamatani; Sachio Ogawa
- Platform: Arcade game / Collectible card game
- Release: JP: October 30, 2004

Love and Berry: Dress Up and Dance! (Note: Known in Japan as Oshare Majo: Rabu Ando Berī (オシャレ魔女 ラブandベリー; lit. Fashionable Witches: Love and Berry)) is a dress-up collectible card game developed and published by Sega for arcades. The game was first shown in amusement arcades on October 30, 2004, and became very popular among the target market in late 2005 through 2006. Game machines were installed in many department stores and children's play areas. Players receive 1 card at the start of the game with barcodes on them that store information for new outfits, accessories, and hairstyles for the game characters. As of April 2006, there are 180 different collectible cards. As of January 2006, approximately 6,800 machines have been installed, and 104 million cards printed. It is the fourth trading card arcade game by Sega, following World Club Champion Football, Mushiking: The King of Beetles and The Key of Avalon.

== Plot ==
Love and Berry are magical witches who possess the power of "Fashion Magic", which allows them to change clothes instantaneously. In the Japanese version, Love is dubbed by voice actress Hiromi Konno, and Berry by Hisayo Yanai.

== Gameplay ==
The game costs ¥100 per play, and dispenses a card each time it is played. By swiping previously won cards, players can change the hair, dress, shoes, and make-up of the two characters, Love and Berry. The game then proceeds to a rhythm game, which is played by tapping one of the buttons in time to the tambourine tapping onscreen as the characters dance. The player's overall fashion rating, based on how the outfit cards are coordinated, as well as their performance in the rhythm game, determines the winner.

Every time a player inserts credits into the machine, a collectible card is dispensed for them to use. This can range from a Dress Up, Hair & Makeup, Footwear, or a Special card. The player can scan any type of cards in any particular order within the time limit given after credits are put into the machine. Every time a card is scanned, the player's selected girl will perform a transformation with the recently scanned card, and the game will calculate the Dress Up power of the overall appearance of the girl through a bar on the side of the screen (Left for Love, right for Berry). When the player is satisfied with their girl's appearance by pressing both buttons or when time has run out, the girl gets transported to the selected stage and displays the Dress Up power in a numerical value, and shows the rating of the overall appearance. The girl will react to how well the player coordinated her appearance on the stage.

When the card dispensed for the play session is retrieved, the player can select from six different game modes. After selecting a game mode, the player can select one of six locations. With the exception of Dress Up Research and 2-Player Competition, the player can pick whether to play as Love or Berry.

== Film ==
In 2007, a CGI anime feature film adaptation titled Love and Berry: Dress Up and Dance - Magic of Happiness was produced by TMS Entertainment.

== Other media ==
Love and Berry DS Collection is a version of the game for the Nintendo DS. Developed by indieszero, it features a DS peripheral that can read the barcodes of the Love and Berry cards acquired from the arcade and features the same gameplay mechanics. Added in this version is a story mode, a new rival, Miesha (who becomes a playable character in later Love and Berry arcade games), and boys. Accessories and a specially pink-colored Nintendo DS Lite are also sold to promote the game. Unlike the original game, it was only released in Japan.

SEGA has launched a fashion line of Love and Berry featuring clothes from the game as well as accessories and sundries with Love and Berry designs. The fashion line features four collections: Natural, Sports, Lovely, Elegance.

On an episode of Haromoni@ aired on September 2, 2007, the J-Pop group Morning Musume visited the game's development studio, sharing their ideas on how to improve the game.
