= Hot Rod (video game) =

1988 video game

- Developer: Sega
- Publishers: Sega; Activision (ports)
- Composers: Arcade; Hiroshi Kawaguchi; N.Y; Commodore 64; Jeroen Tel
- Platforms: Arcade, Atari ST, Commodore 64, Amiga, ZX Spectrum, Amstrad CPC
- Release: JP December 1988 (arcade); WW April 1989 (arcade); 1990 (ports)
- Genre: Racing
- Mode: Multiplayer
- Arcade system: Sega System 24

Hot Rod is a top-down racing video game developed by Sega. It was released as an arcade video game in 1988 in Japan and worldwide in 1989. The game was available in a four-player cocktail-style arcade cabinet and a three-player upright cabinet. Ports were published by Activision in 1990 for the Amiga, ZX Spectrum, Amstrad CPC, Commodore 64, and Atari ST.

== Gameplay ==
The main goal of the game is to race against up to 4 players on a variety of tracks.

Whenever a player falls off screen, gas is subtracted from their gas meter. When a player's gas meter reaches zero, their game is over. A player can pick up flashing targets symbolized with letter "G" to add 10 units of gas to the player's gas meter. If a player successfully crosses the finish line, they are rewarded additional units of gas.

After every race, players go to the Parts Shop to purchase upgrades for their car. These include: three front or rear engines, three types of bumpers, three types of spoilers, and two types of tires. There are additional types of tires including radial tires, speed tires, spike tires, and snow tires. The player may equip either a front or rear engine, but not both at once. Players may not equip a spoiler and a rear engine simultaneously.

There are 30 different races across 10 environments including: busy highways, dirt roads, a beach side, a mountain, farmlands, a snowy terrain, a desert, a construction zone, a shipyard, and city streets. There are 3 races per environment, with every third race taking the players to a stadium for a victory ceremony. Afterwards, the players find themselves in a new environment.

== Reception ==
In Japan, Game Machine listed Hot Rod on their June 1, 1988 issue as being the fourth most-successful upright/cockpit arcade unit of the month.
