= Aurail =

1990 video game

- Arcade flyer
- Developer: Westone
- Publisher: Sega
- Composer: Shinichi Sakamoto
- Platform: Arcade
- Release: JP: October 1990; NA: Late 1990
- Genres: Shooter game, first-person shooter
- Modes: Single-player, multiplayer
- Arcade system: Sega System 16B

Aurail is a scrolling shoot 'em up arcade game developed by Westone and released by Sega in 1990. The player pilots a tank mecha and shoots enemies (it can fire in 8 directions), collects power-ups to increase shields, operates the remote attack drone, and defeats bosses to advance levels. It features tunnel levels with a first-person view.

In North America, the game was released as an arcade conversion kit.

== Gameplay ==
Gameplay is divided into two types. Some stages let the player take control of the tank from a top-down 3rd-person view. The tank can shoot in 8 directions. Holding down the fire button enables auto-fire, but the tank is not able to move during that time. The tank is destroyed with one hit, but a certain amount of energy can be used to create a shield, which can take one hit. Up to three shields can be stacked. Energy is obtained by collecting power orbs which are left by shot down enemies. Enemies can also leave a green "D"-power up, which summons a robotic orb which will accompany the tank until the next life loss. As long as energy is available, the orb can be ordered to attack a target in range. The other stages are played from a first-person view. The player must fend off several waves of enemies and navigate through destructible mines. In this mode, the tank can also move while auto-firing. Power orbs can again be obtained, but the robotic orb is not present in this mode. The button to make the orb attack is instead used to turn the tank around.

== Relation to Blood Gear ==
Westone's PC Engine/TurboGrafx-16 game Blood Gear (1994) identifies itself as "Aurail Scenario 2" in the ending credits. The game also contains artifacts and references to Aurail as a lost civilization, but Westone co-founder Ryuichi Nishizawa has stated in an interview, that Blood Gear is not a sequel.
