= Miyasato Miyoshi Kyoudai Naizou: Sega Golf Club =

2006 video game

Sega Golf Club Miyasato Miyoshi Kyoudai Naizou
- Cover art
- Developer(s): Sega
- Publisher(s): Sega
- Platform(s): PlayStation 3
- Release: JP: November 11, 2006
- Genre(s): Sports
- Mode(s): Single-player, multiplayer

Miyasato Miyoshi Kyoudai Naizou: Sega Golf Club (宮里三兄弟内蔵 SEGA GOLFCLUB) is a golf video game developed by Sega for the PlayStation 3. It was released in Japan as part of the console's launch titles on November 11, 2006.
