= Mushiking: The King of Beetles =

2003 video game

- Developer: Sega
- Publisher: Sega
- Platform: Arcade
- Release: JP: 2003
- Genre: Collectible card
- Modes: Single-player, multiplayer
- Arcade system: Sega NAOMI

Kōchū Ōja Mushiking, (Note: Japanese: 甲虫王者ムシキング, Hepburn: Kōchū Ōja Mushikingu; lit. 'Beetle Ruler Bug King') known outside Japan as Mushiking: The King of Beetles or Mushiking: Battle of the Beetles, is a 2003 collectible card video game developed and published by Sega for arcades. The game involves battles between cards describing various species of beetles. The cards can be scanned in by a Mushiking arcade machine, which will both carry out battles and dispense new cards. It is the second trading card arcade by Sega following World Club Champion Football.

As of 2008, more than 100,000 tournaments have been held, and 20 million cards have shipped. The game has made it into the Guinness World Records with the highest numbers of tournaments held for an arcade game.

== Plot ==
A long time ago, there was a forest full of trees inhabited by insects and fairies. A fairy named Popo was a friend of the insects of the forest. He refers to the Japanese rhinoceros beetle as "Mushiking". One day, giant beetles from parts unknown arrived in the forest to wreak havoc under the control of Adder, a wizard exiled from the forest who wishes to conquer it. Popo enlists the player's help to fight against Adder.

== Characters ==
Popo

Popo is one of the fairies of the forest and is one of the main protagonists. He is responsible for leading the player throughout the events of the games and is a close friend of Mushiking. He is kind and is willing to help and heal other beetles, even if they serve Adder. In the story, he is able to trace and imprison Adder initially with the help of the player, and he imprisons Adder. Though Adder escapes, Popo heals the beetle that helped Adder, and they defeat him again in his fortress. After Adder's supposed death, Popo moves elsewhere to another forest as Adder had burned down their previous one. When Adder is revealed to be alive, Popo continues to have the player and Mushiking stop Adder's plans.

Adder (Note: アダー, Adā)

Adder is a wizard previously banished from the forest, and acts as the game's main antagonist. Prior to becoming a wizard, Adder was a doctor that treated insects of the forest, but an accident took the life of Adder's son, and the grief-stricken man became evil shortly afterwards. He mutates other beetles by injecting red fluids into their bodies, making them more aggressive, powerful, and submissive only to him. The effects of this mutation is evident by the red, glowing eyes of his beetles. During the games, he returns from his banishment, bringing a wave of foreign and powerful insects to attack the forest. Though he is defeated by Popo and the player, he uses a beetle whistle to escape confinement. After another defeat, Adder proceeds to set the forest on fire, but Mushiking had already evacuated the insects of the forest, and he is confronted by the player, Mushiking and Popo, and he is presumably killed at the end. He later reappears, having survived the attempt with a new plan to mutate beetles in their pupa state, with the hopes of making them even stronger than they normally are, and corrupting them before they can even develop properly.

Mushiking (Note: ムシキング, Mushikingu)

Mushiking is a Japanese rhinoceros beetle who is good friends with Popo who considers him as the strongest beetle in the forest. During Adder's invasion, Mushiking is unable to fight off all the invading insects, and doesn't appear until much later in the game's story. Once Adder sets the forest on fire, Mushiking appears to save Popo and joins him and the player in confronting Adder for the final fight. He later assists Popo in foiling Adder's new plan of corrupting beetle pupa. During gameplay, Mushiking was initially treated as a standard Japanese Rhinoceros Beetle, but with extra power. By version 12, however, Mushiking was given his own exclusive card, along with his skill level and super finishing attack being readjusted to fit the change.

== Gameplay ==
Mushiking is a rock-paper-scissors-style battle game that can be played by one player against CPU-controlled beetles, or with two or more players against each other in Tournament mode or Tag Battle mode. The game is played with cards representing beetles and skill cards related to three move types: "Hitting", "Pinching" and "Throwing". Players scan their cards with the card scanner in the middle of the machine, and choose one of the three move types to execute within a given time limit. The first player whose beetle reaches 0 stamina points loses.

The following things can happen during a battle:

- If a player chooses the winning move, the winning player's beetle shall execute the skill learned for that type of move.
- If both players pick the same move, a tie will result and both players' beetles lose 10% of their total stamina.
- If a player has chosen a move and the other player has not selected a move within the time limit, the other player's move will automatically lose.

Tournament mode is a 2-out-of-3 match between two players, and Tag Battle mode allows players to cooperatively play two beetles as a tag team against an opponent, where they can perform joint attacks if they are compatible types.

== Cards ==
The cards for Mushiking have lengthwise barcodes for players to scan into the arcade machines, and come in several types. Later versions, however, changed this to a single crosswise bar code at the bottom of the card, before the bar code was removed from the front entirely. This was presumably to prevent people from simply printing out an image of the card online, and scanning the bar code on the reader.

Beetle cards represent the beetle characters the player can control. Each beetle card is marked with information on the beetle's species (name, Latin name, description, etc.) as well as the card's stats such as strength in the three move types and stamina as well as their base power, which is usually determined by the size of the beetle and rarity of the card. The Finishing Move indicates the beetle's "favored" move, which can cause major damage to the opponent if the player wins through a Finishing Move. Rare beetle cards are printed with a holographic background and is colored in either Bronze (for 160 Base power), Silver (for 180 Base power) or Gold (for 200 Base power). Several different editions, such as the Parallel Edition cards and the Adder Collection, have been released of the same cards.

Skill cards represent the abilities a beetle can use. A player can only scan one skill card per skill type. Every skill card requires a certain skill point number; if the number is equal to the beetle's skill point level, the result will be a perfect compatibility. If the beetle's skill point is greater than the skill, it results in a "good" compatibility. If the beetle's skill point is less than the skill point of the card, it will worsen the effectiveness of the skill used by that beetle.

Special Skill Cards are skill cards that may give a player the advantage over the opponent aside from an elaborate, damaging move. The skill point of Special Skill Cards is marked with an Exclamation Point ("!"). Special Skills are activated when certain conditions have been met, such as pressing a move on the first count of the countdown, experiencing a tie, etc. There are also rare, "upgraded" skill cards with certain low-level beetles' Finishing Moves. If the right skill card is scanned with the right beetle, the result will be a "Super Max" Compatibility and will deal tremendous damage if used. The upgraded skill cards are moves used by beetles with a Base Power range of 100 to 120, which gives them an advantage against rarer, stronger cards with a higher Base Power rating.

License cards can be scanned prior to the battle, which cause the machine to read off a certain title for the scanning player. These cards are normally awarded by Sega and other officiary bodies to winners of major Mushiking championships or tournaments, and are not dispensed by machines.

== Other media ==
Mushiking: The King of Beetles ~ Zach Adventure Series ~ is a manga series written and illustrated by Ooseyoshi. It has been serialized in the monthly CoroCoro Comics from February 2005 to October 2006 and in Bessatsu CoroCoro from April 2004 to February 2008. The manga series has a total of 8 volumes. The story follows the adventures of Zach, who is continuously searching for a treasure on a fictional planet, Dekaiya, while at the same time another, rivaling protagonist, Kabuto Maru, is seeking Mushiking. A Mushiking anime, produced by TMS Entertainment and broadcast by TV Tokyo, aired from April 6, 2005 until March 3, 2006.

Pro Wrestling Noah, a Japanese professional wrestling organization, has given a Mushiking-related gimmick, "Mushiking Terry", to one of its wrestlers, Kotaro Suzuki. Mushiking Terry feuds with his rival Mushiking Joker, portrayed by Ricky Marvin.

Sega released a Game Boy Advance game titled Kouchuu Ouja Mushiking: Greatest Champion e no Michi exclusively in Japan in June 2005.

In July 2007, Sega released a Nintendo DS version of the game in Japan to commemorate the five year anniversary of the franchise. The DS version comes with the Card Reader that players can use on their existing cards from the arcade game or cards exclusive to the DS game. The game comes with a starter deck that includes 7 cards, three of which give a random beetle in a specialized section every time they are used (rock, paper, and scissors). The game supports all of the arcade modes and includes a Wi-Fi mode to play against unseen players across Japan. Due to a significant difference in power between the Nintendo DS and the arcade machines, there is a noticeable difference in graphical quality and frame rate.

In 2016, Sega released Yakuza Kiwami with a MesuKing minigame, a parody of Mushiking, based on the Catfight minigame from Yakuza 0, on PlayStation 3 and PlayStation 4 in Japan. The game was released in the West in 2017.

== See also ==
- Dinosaur King
- Oshare Majo: Love and Berry
