= List of Sega arcade system boards =

Arcade system boards produced by Sega

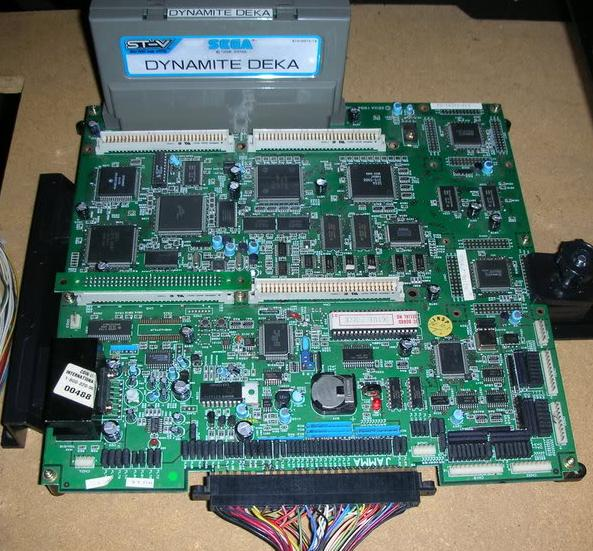
A Sega Titan-Video (ST-V) arcade system board, based on Sega Saturn hardware and featuring interchangeable games

Sega is a video game developer, publisher, and hardware development company headquartered in Tokyo, Japan, with multiple offices around the world. The company's involvement in the arcade game industry began as a Japan-based distributor of coin-operated machines, including pinball games and jukeboxes. Sega imported second-hand machines that required frequent maintenance. This necessitated the construction of replacement guns, flippers, and other parts for the machines. According to former Sega director Akira Nagai, this is what led the company into developing their own games.

Sega released Pong-Tron, its first video-based game, in 1973. The company prospered from the arcade game boom of the late 1970s, with revenues climbing to over US$100 million by 1979. Nagai has stated that Hang-On and Out Run helped to pull the arcade game market out of the 1983 downturn and created new genres of video games.

In terms of arcades, Sega is the world's most prolific arcade game producer, having developed more than 500 games, 70 franchises, and 20 arcade system boards since 1981. It has been recognized by Guinness World Records for this achievement. The following list comprises the various arcade system boards developed and used by Sega in their arcade games.

== Arcade system boards ==
Arcade board	Notes	Notable games and release years
Dual	Capable of both black-and-white and color display; Capable of packaging two games in the same arcade cabinet	Head On (1979); Head On 2 (1979)
G80	Introduced arcade conversion kits where games could be changed in 15 minutes via a card cage housed in game cabinet with six PC boards; kits were sold as Convert-a-Game paks or ConvertaPaks; Color display; Capable of raster and vector graphics; Possessed the world's first color X-Y video system; Convert-a-Game released in 1981, making it the second interchangeable arcade system (after the DECO Cassette System); Inspired later interchangeable arcade systems such as the Nintendo VS. System.	Space Odyssey (1981); Space Fury (1981); Eliminator (1981); Star Trek: Strategic Operations Simulator (1983)
VCO Object	Named after the voltage-controlled oscillator (VCO).; Also called the Sega Z80-3D System.; Uses a Zilog Z80 CPU.; Uses scaling to create 3D effects.	Turbo (1981); Buck Rogers: Planet of Zoom (1982); SUBROC-3D (1982)
LaserDisc	Supports LaserDisc playback, using a Pioneer LaserDisc player.; Capable of displaying computer graphics over video footage.; Technology licensed to Bally Midway in 1983.	Astron Belt (1983); Star Blazer / Galaxy Ranger (1983); GP World (1984); ALBEGASll (1984); NFL Football (1984); Time Traveler (1991); AS-1 (1991); Muggo (1992); Michael Jackson in Scramble Training (1993)
System 1 System 2	Released in July 1983.; Not designed with console ports in mind, but some titles were ported to the Master System; System 2's graphics unit served as the basis for the Master System's graphics chip	Flicky (1984); Choplifter (1985); Sega Ninja (1985); Wonder Boy (1986); Shooting Master (System 2, 1985); Wonder Boy in Monster Land (System 2, 1987)
Super Scaler	Initially known as "Sega Hang-On hardware"; was developed for Hang-On; Refinement of VCO Object hardware; Featured two Motorola 68000 processors.; 16-bit hardware; First board in the Super Scaler series	Hang-On (1985); Space Harrier (1985)
System E	Stripped-down version of Master System hardware	Hang-On Jr. (1986)
System 16; System 18	"System 16" redirects here. For the tower computer, see Pronto System 16.: Successor to the System 1 and System 2 boards, released in 1985; Nearly 40 titles released; Four different versions of System 16 were made; Served as the basis for design of the Mega Drive/Genesis; Uses a Motorola 68000 and a Zilog Z80 as processors; Limited to 128 sprites on screen at a time	Fantasy Zone (16A, 1986); Quartet (1986); Alien Syndrome (16B, 1987); Shinobi (1987); Altered Beast (1988); Golden Axe (1989); Aurail (16B, 1990); Shadow Dancer (18, 1989); Alien Storm (18, 1990); D. D. Crew (18, 1991)
OutRun	Based on the System 16; Second generation Super Scaler board; able to use sprite scaling to simulate 3D using Super Scaler technology; Designed because Yu Suzuki was unable to make Out Run on existing technology at the time	Out Run (1986); Super Hang-On (1987); Turbo Outrun (1989)
X Board	Capable of displaying 256 sprites on screen at the same time; Capable of running at 60 frames per second	After Burner (1987); Thunder Blade (1987); Super Monaco GP (1989); A.B. Cop (1990); GP Rider (1990)
System 24	Displayed in 496 × 384 resolution, larger than the 320 × 224 to which Sega designers were accustomed at the time; Limited character RAM; Early games loaded onto a floppy disk and could be switched	Gain Ground (1988); Bonanza Bros. (1990)
Y Board	Fourth board in the Super Scaler series, and successor to the X Board; Added an extra CPU and memory, as well as upgraded video hardware compared to the X Board; Capable of performing real-time sprite rotation	Galaxy Force (1988); Galaxy Force II (1988); Power Drift (1988)
Mega-Tech; Mega Play	Modified version of Mega Drive/Genesis hardware, designed to play multiple games; Mega-Tech capable of playing up to eight games; Mega Play capable of playing up to four games; Distributed in the United States by Belam	Mega-Tech Arcade System (1989); Mega Play; Altered Beast; Shinobi; Super Hang-On
System C	Also known as System 14; Based on Mega Drive/Genesis hardware	Bloxeed (1989); Columns (1990)
System 32	Final board in the Super Scaler series; Sega's first 32-bit system, and final major sprite-based board; Uses NEC V60 processor; Research and development began in 1988	Rad Mobile (1990); F1 Exhaust Note (1991); Golden Axe: The Revenge of Death Adder (1992); SegaSonic the Hedgehog (1993); Dark Edge (1993); Burning Rival (1993); Jurassic Park (1994)
Model 1	Sega's first video game system designed for 3D polygon graphics, developed internally at Sega between 1990 and 1991.; Uses the same NEC V60 processor as in the System 32; Contains a custom graphics unit, the CG Board, that can display 180,000 polygons per second and 6,500 polygons per frame; Capable of displaying 60 frames per second; Board had a high cost during development; Original concept was initially conceived around 1988, and Sega began staff hiring for new system in 1989	Virtua Racing (1992); Virtua Fighter (1993); Star Wars Arcade (1993); Wing War (1994)
Model 2	Developed in collaboration with GE Aerospace.; The first Sega board using Lockheed Martin technology, to produce texture-mapped 3D polygon graphics.; Sega and GE Aerospace began co-development of texture-mapping 3D arcade system in September 1992, originally intended for release in 1993.; Introduced the use of texture filtering and texture anti-aliasing; Added Compu-Scene 3D graphics technology; Utilizes the Intel i960 RISC processor for its CPU.; Capable of displaying 300,000 textured polygons per second, at 60 frames per second.; Licensed to other developers; Model 2 sold over 130,000 arcade systems by 1996.	Daytona USA (1994); Virtua Cop (1994); Virtua Fighter 2 (1994); Sega Rally Championship (1994); Virtua Cop 2 (1995); Fighting Vipers (1995); Virtual-On: Cyber Troopers (1996); Sonic the Fighters (1996); Dead or Alive (1996); The House of the Dead (1997); Top Skater (1997); Dynamite Cop (1998)
Sega Titan‑Video (ST‑V)	"ST-V" redirects here. For other uses, see STV.: Based on Sega Saturn architecture; Was Sega's low-end board during its lifespan, underpowered compared to the Model 2; Uses two Hitachi SH-2 CPU processors.	Funky Head Boxers (1995); Virtua Fighter Remix (1995); Die Hard Arcade (1996)
Model 3	Developed in collaboration with Lockheed Martin; First unveiled at the 1996 AOU (Amusement Machine Operators' Union) show; Utilizes a PowerPC processor for its CPU; Upon release, was the most powerful arcade system board in existence; Released in multiple "steps" with improving specifications; Model 2 and 3 sold more than 200,000 arcade systems combined by 2000.	Virtua Fighter 3 (1996); Scud Race (1996); Sega Rally 2 (1998); Fighting Vipers 2 (1998); Daytona USA 2: Battle on the Edge (1998); SpikeOut (1998); Star Wars Trilogy Arcade (1998)
NAOMI	Released in 1998 at one-third the price of the Model 3; Shared architecture with Dreamcast, but with additional main, graphics and sound memory (32, 16 and 8 megabytes respectively); Uses Hitachi SH-4 CPU processor and PowerVR graphics processor; Uses ROM boards, with optional GD-ROM drive. If a drive is used, it will be used at bootup to copy data to a DIMM RAM board instead.; NAOMI multiboard can use 3 or 4 boards at the same time depending on the game; NAOMI is a backronym for New Arcade Operation Machine Idea. The name NAOMI was reportedly selected by Sega R&D head Hisashi Suzuki in honor of the British model Naomi Campbell.	The House of the Dead 2 (1998); Crazy Taxi (1999); Dead or Alive 2 (1999); Derby Owners Club (1999); F355 Challenge (1999); Power Stone (1999); Marvel vs. Capcom 2: New Age of Heroes (2000); Monkey Ball (2001); Mushiking: The King of Beetles (2003); Rhythm Tengoku (2006); Sega Networks Taisen Mahjong MJ (2002)
Hikaru	Custom modified version of NAOMI hardware; Uses a custom Sega graphics chip and had more memory than the NAOMI; Capable of smooth Phong shading and particle effects.; Much more expensive than NAOMI	Air Trix (2001); Brave Fire Fighters (1999); Cyber Troopers Virtual-On Force (2001); Star Wars: Racer Arcade (2000); Planet Harriers (2000); NASCAR Arcade (2000)
NAOMI 2	NAOMI 2, released in 2000, served as high-end replacement for Hikaru.; Next-generation successor to NAOMI.; Uses PowerVR co-processor capable of transform, clipping, and lighting (T&L).; Capable of rendering a fillrate of 2,000 megapixels per second.	Wild Riders (2001); Virtua Fighter 4 (2001); Virtua Striker 3 (2001); Initial D Arcade Stage (2002); World Club Champion Football SERIE A 2001-2002 (2002); Soul Surfer (2002)
Triforce	Co-developed by Namco, Sega, and Nintendo; Based on GameCube architecture. Supported GameCube memory cards.; The idea for Triforce came from Namco and Sega. They saw potential in the GameCube architecture for a cost-effective and port-friendly arcade machine. Nintendo agreed to cooperate in building the Triforce board, but had little interest in developing arcade games of their own.	Avalon no Kagi (2003); F-Zero AX (2003); Mario Kart Arcade GP (2005); Mario Kart Arcade GP 2 (2007); Virtua Striker 4 (2004)
Chihiro	Based on Xbox architecture	The House of the Dead III (2002); OutRun 2 (2003); Virtua Cop 3 (2003); Ghost Squad (2004); Crazy Taxi 3: High Roller (2003); Quest of D (2004); Ollie King (2004); Sega Golf Club (2004); Wangan Midnight Maximum Tune (2004); Sega Networks Taisen Mahjong MJ3 (2005); Sangokushi Taisen (2005); Wangan Midnight Maximum Tune 2 (2005)
SystemSP	Capable of software upgrade with CompactFlash	Love & Berry: Dress Up & Dance (2004); Dinosaur King (2005); Brick People (2009)
Lindbergh	Uses a specialized version of Montavista Linux for an operating system; Uses a 3 GHz Pentium 4 CPU, 1 GB RAM and an Nvidia GPU; LAN play capabilities, USB controller slots and DVD-ROM.	The House of the Dead 4 (2005); Virtua Tennis 3 (2006); Virtua Fighter 5 (2006); After Burner Climax (2006); Initial D Arcade Stage 4 (2007); Let's Go Jungle: Lost on the Island of Spice (2006); Sega Network Casino Club (2007); Answer X Answer (2007); Too Spicy (2007); Sega Networks Taisen Mahjong MJ4 (2008); Sega Race TV (2008); RAMBO (2008)RAMBO; Psy-Phi (cancelled)
Europa-R	Runs at 60 frames per second and 720p video resolution	Sega Rally 3 (2008); Race Driver: Grid (2010)
RingEdge; RingWide; RingEdge 2	RingEdge and RingEdge 2 utilize Pentium Dual-Core CPUs, and are the higher-end units; RingWide uses a Celeron CPU; All three run Windows Embedded Standard 2009	Border Break (2009); Shining Force Cross (2009); Hatsune Miku: Project DIVA Arcade (2010); Sengoku Taisen (2010); Let's Go Island 3D (2011); Initial D: Arcade Stage 6 AA (2011); Chaos Code (RingWide, 2011); Sega Networks Taisen Mahjong MJ5 (2011); Initial D Arcade Stage 7 AA X (2012); Operation G.H.O.S.T (RingWide, 2012); Maimai (RingEdge 2, 2012); Transformers: Human Alliance (RingEdge 2, 2013); Code of Joker (RingEdge 2, 2013)
Nu; Nu 1.1; Nu 2	Uses Windows Embedded 8 Standard for an operating system; Nu and Nu 1.1: Intel Core i3-3220 CPU; Nvidia GeForce GTX 650 Ti graphics card (Nu); Nvidia GeForce GTX 750 Ti graphics card (Nu 1.1); Nu 2: Intel Core i5-6500 CPU; Nvidia GeForce GTX 950 graphics card; All Nu arcade boards have DirectX 11 support.	Hatsune Miku: Project DIVA Arcade Future Tone (2013); E-DEL Sand (Nu SX, 2014); Wonderland Wars (2015); Chunithm (2015); Shin Mushiking (2015); Initial D: Arcade Stage Zero (Nu 2, 2016)
ALLS	Uses Windows 10 IoT Enterprise LTSC for an operating system; Hardware spec may differ on the ALLS system used in the arcade cabinet; Capable of running Unreal Engine 4-based games; ALLS is a backronym for Amusement Linkage Live System.	Maimai DX (2019); Chunithm SUPERSTAR (2019) & Chunithm NEW!! (2021); O.N.G.E.K.I (2018); House of the Dead: Scarlet Dawn (2018); Dead or Alive 6 (2019)

== Additional arcade hardware ==
Sega has developed and released additional arcade games that use technology other than their dedicated arcade system boards. The first arcade game manufactured by Sega was Periscope, an electromechanical game. This was followed by Missile in 1969. Subsequent video-based games such as Pong-Tron (1973), Fonz (1976), and Monaco GP (1979) used discrete logic boards without a CPU microprocessor. Frogger (1981) used a system powered by two Z80 CPU microprocessors. Some titles, such as Zaxxon (1982) were developed externally from Sega, a practice that was not uncommon at the time.

== See also ==
- Sega R360
- List of Sega pinball machines
- List of Sega video game consoles
