= World Club Champion Football =

- Arcade flyer for WCCF
- Developers: Hitmaker; Sega
- Publisher: Sega
- Producers: Hisao Oguchi; Mie Kumagai; Jun Tsuchiya
- Composers: Takenobu Mitsuyoshi; Junpei Mishiyama; Takahiro Kai; Mitsuhuru Fukuyama; Chihiro Aoki
- Platform: Arcade
- Release: Arcade^{JPN} 2002, 2003, 2005, 2006, 2007, 2008, 2009, 2010, 2011, 2012, 2013, 2014, 2015, 2016, 2017, 2018, 2019, 2020^{EUR} 2005, 2006
- Genres: Sports, DCCG
- Modes: Single-player, multiplayer
- Arcade system: Sega NAOMI 2, Lindbergh, RingEdge

World Club Champion Football is a Japanese football/soccer sports arcade video game and digital collectible card game released by Sega. The game is officially abbreviated as WCCF. It is the first arcade game to combine trading cards with a video game, establishing a new genre of arcade game. The game was mostly released in Japan and has never received a port.

The player builds a team by collecting and trading specially marked player cards, produced by Panini.

== Gameplay ==
As a club team manager, the players build and lead the team to win titles during the contract. At first a starter pack is purchased, which includes 11 player cards, as well as the club card. To start the game, the club card is inserted into the machine and then a coin is inserted. In the game, the players first sign manager contract and then build a new team. Then a number of details can be entered, including the managers name and date of birth, the teams hometown, kit and badge. Next they are on the team management section, where they practice, register new players and communicate with team members to increase the team's strength and decrease their weaknesses, or enter a match. During the match, the players switch between defense and offensive at the appropriate situation. After the match, the players are rewarded with a player card.

On the player cards itself a variety of info can be found, including the current club logo, player picture and name, special skill and parameters for individual stats or in total. On the back of the card they can also find the favourite position and card number. There are three types of cards, rare, special and regular cards.

The club card acts as the IC card and contains information of the club team and manager data. Stored is the team's growth, team roster, team result, manager result, prize money, annual income and win or loss record. After the contract is completed, another club card needs to be purchased. Inserting the old and new club card at once into the machine imports the data from the old card to the new one.

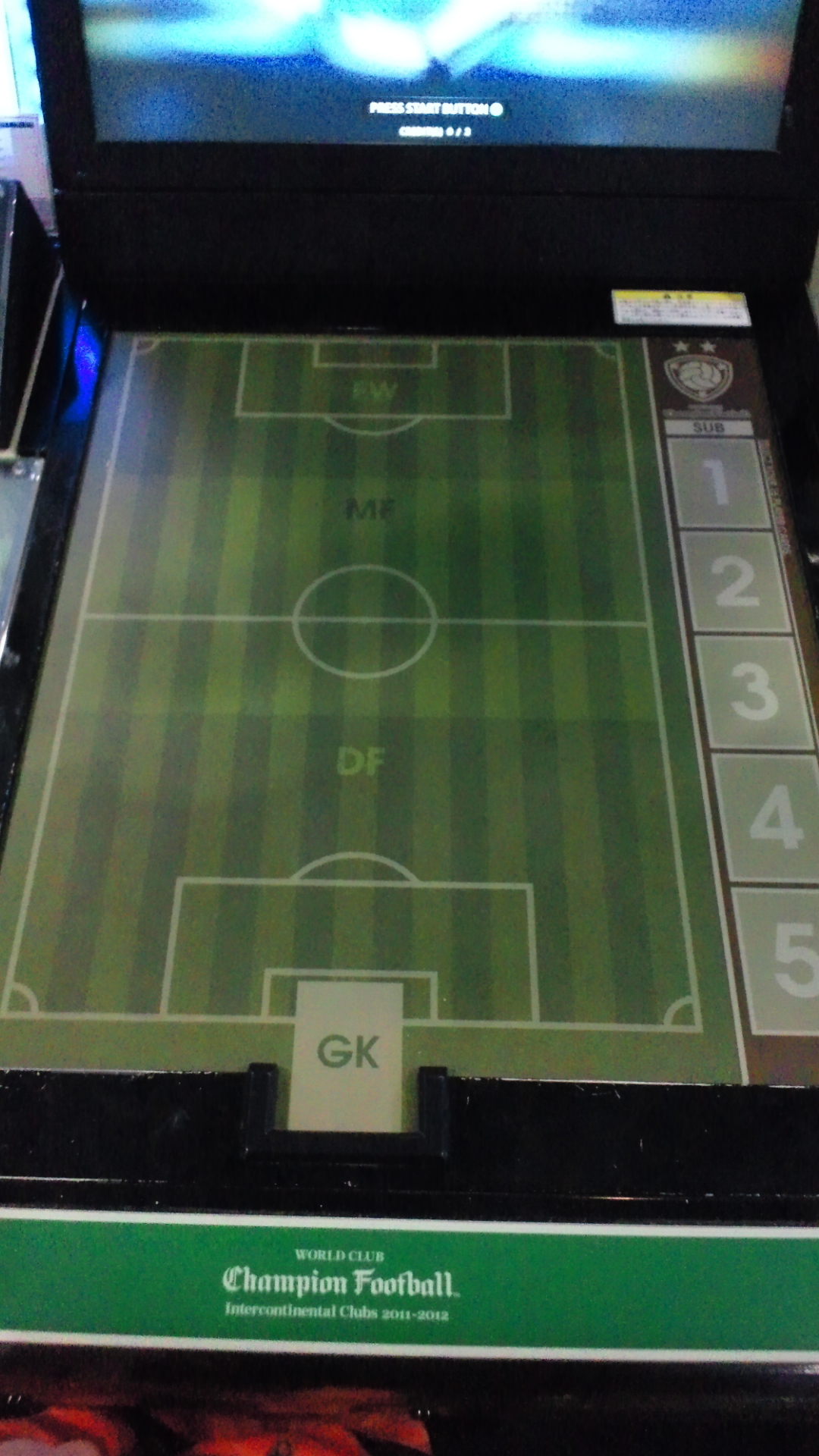
The flat panel card reader of WCCF

Team management is done through several major areas: training, communication, player registration and event. The players can also find matches and view team data. In training they either train through specialized scenarios all based on training the 6 attributes of offense, defence, passing, possession, speed and power or through training matches. Routinely it is also recommended to give the team days off to revitalize the players. In order to speak to the player, the card is rubbed. Giving them good advice raises their motivation and summoning two players at once to talk to them improves their partnership. Player partnership can also be improved through training sessions and friendly matches. It is also possible to assign a team captain and change the shirt number of the player. Through team data, the individual players number of games played, team experience, level of player partnership and motivation can be viewed. New players are also registered but the player should be aware of certain conditions for matches that don't allow certain combination of cards. These 4 conditions are: regular cards only, no card limit, under five special cards and lastly under five special and rare cards. Finding a friendly match is made through requesting a match with people connected to the same game machine. Various events are also activated which effect the team itself.

Other than friendly matches, there are also matches in the regular league. Regular league is either played in Division 1 or Division 2. Winning regularly promotes the players to Division 1 which has more difficult opponents than Division 2. Prize money differs heavily between the two. Between regular league matches, tournament matches are held, which go through seven cycles, as well as with a tournament match, all with their own entry conditions.

During a match, two graphics are displayed: the team grid and the formation view. The team grid displays the ranking of the team, the play state that is calculated from the formation view and team moral that ranges from "great" to "terrible". On the team grid it also displays stats as a hexagon with the aforementioned attributes as stats. Displayed on the hexagon are three areas of effect displayed in their own colors. The formation level of the team, which changes depending on the formation, is marked as green. The practice level which is yellow shows the stats gained from training. The club performance is a bright green that is supposed to overlap and match the practice and formation level. The more it matches them, the better the team plays. The second graph displayed is the formation view which displays the pitch, strength gauge of each player, substitution area and the opponents players cards. The players own cards are also displayed as their own icons with a number of information. Always displayed is the position of the players divided into four colors (red for forward, orange for midfield, green for defense, and blue for goalkeeper), the stamina meter which decreases gradually as well as the player's motivation and morale. The players can also be injured, receive either a yellow or red card, be swapped with others from the substitution area, or be completely removed.

Players are registered through placing a maximum amount of 16 players, including substitutes, on the pitch of the flat panel card reader of the arcade cabinet. It is critical to use the player's strengths effectively, as it is not recommended to use a quick or defense player for breaking the defense of the opponent. Many real life formations can be replicated including diamond, balanced, offensive or defense. The flat panel reader of the cabinet can detect if the players swap the players from the substitute area, or do a forward gesture on the card to be offensive and do a backwards gesture to do defending. There are also several buttons on the cabinet, divided into 2 action buttons, and tactics buttons with 4 directional buttons and a center button. With the action buttons the player either shoots the ball or makes the goalie go for the ball. Giving orders to the entire team is made with the tactics button either with left, right, centre, counterattack or pressure buttons, which can be freely combined by pressing multiple buttons at the same time. The buttons are also used to navigate the menus.

== Versions ==
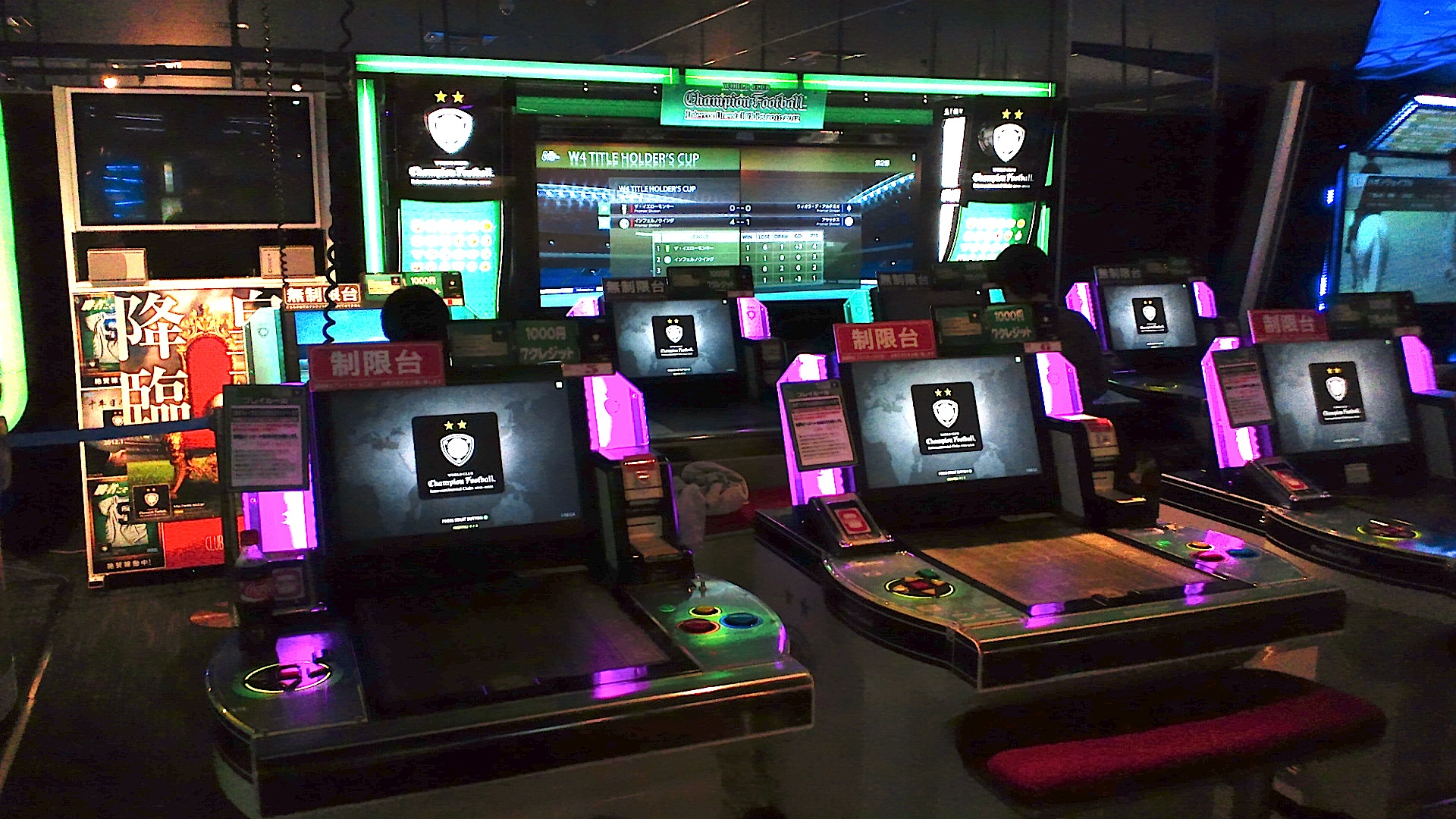
Cabinets of WCCF 2011-2012

The first game titled SERIE A 2001-2002 was released in June 2002 on the NAOMI 2 arcade platform and is based on the Italian Serie A football league.

SERIE A 2002-2003 was released in September 2003.

European Clubs 2004-2005 was released in August 2005. Four European football teams are available from Spanish, Netherland, English and Italian leagues. Nationwide online play has also been added with Sega's ALL.Net service.

European Clubs 2005-2006 was released in August 2006. It added teams from Germany and France. This version was released throughout Europe.

Intercontinental Clubs 2006-2007 was released in September 2008 and added teams from South America. It switched arcade boards to the Sega Lindbergh.

Intercontinental Clubs 2006-2007 was released in February 2009.

Intercontinental Clubs 2008-2009 was released in November 2009.

Intercontinental Clubs 2009-2010 was released in December 2010. This was first time national Japanese teams were added.

Intercontinental Clubs 2010-2011 was released in November 2011 and added other Asian teams in addition to the Japanese ones.

Intercontinental Clubs 2011-2012 was released in November 2012 and now up to ten teams can be saved on a single card. With the WCCF.Net it became possible to check various informations of player's teams as well of their registered friends.

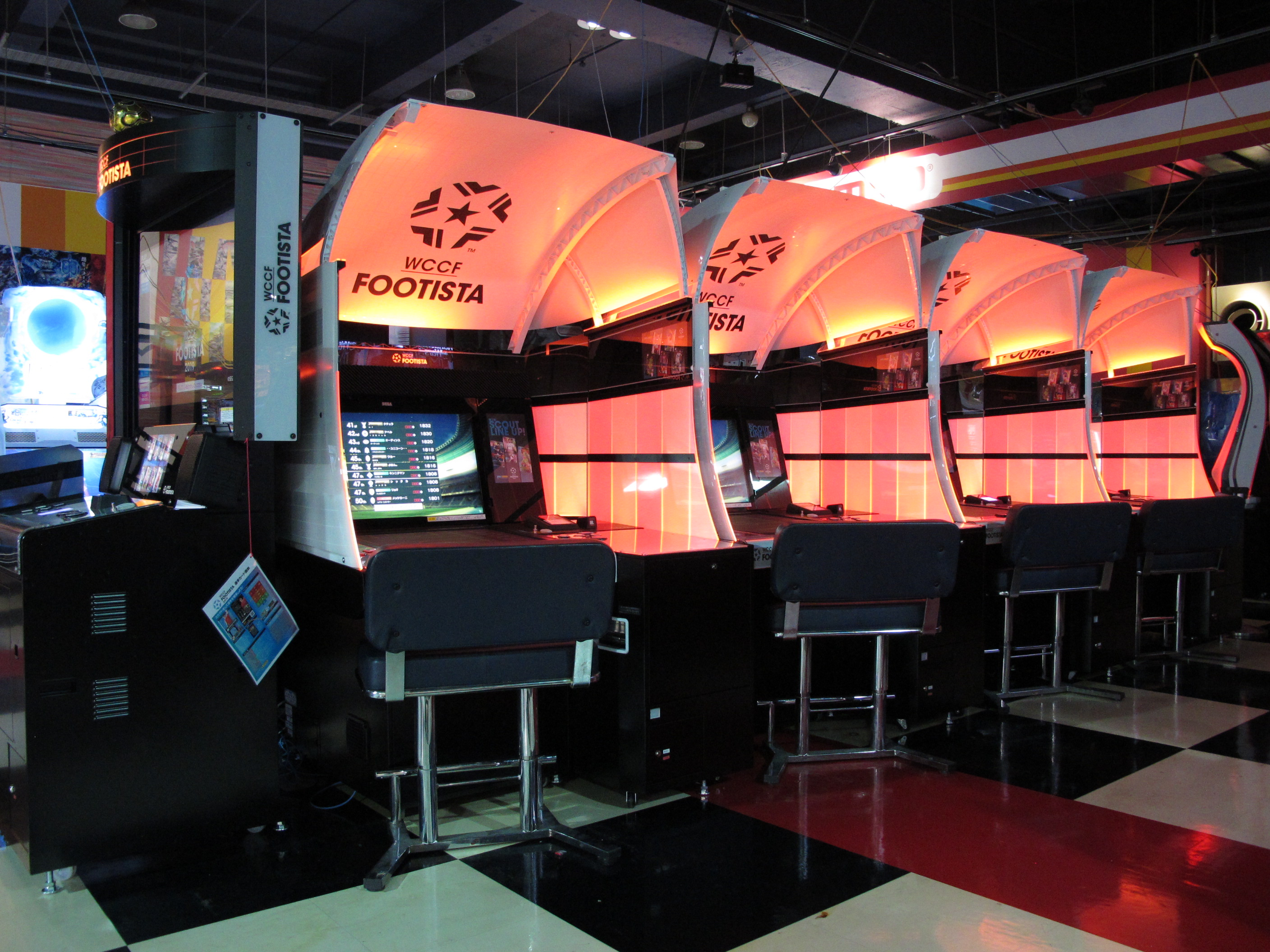
WCCF FOOTISTA 2019 arcade cabinets

2012-2013 was released in December 2013 and a single player mode called league mode was added.

2013-2014 was released in November 2013.

2015-2016 was released in January 2016.

2016-2017 was released in January 2017 and added the ability the train the manager in various characteristics.

2017-2018 was released in January 2018.

The game was renewed with WCCF Footista 2019 which included a new cabinet that simulates a stadium. It also switched the engine to Unreal Engine 4 and was released in March 2019.

WCCF Footista 2020 was released in January 2020.

WCCF Footista 2021 was released in December 2020. The service ended in March 2022, bringing to an end a series that has lasted almost 20 years since the release of the first game.

== Development ==
The game's development took two and a half years, while usually arcade games take about half that time. Overall, about 20 people were on the development team. The game's cabinet set-up was overall unprecedented with 8 players playing at the same time and 9 monitors. 10 NAOMI arcade boards are connected to a PC which acts as a server. Also new was the flat panel card reader surface which was completely developed by the hardware department of Sega, along with the deck reading mechanisms later used in The Key of Avalon. It was decided that the flat panel would be more suited to WCCF, rather than the deck reader. The game used Serie A from Italy as a way to promote the game alongside the world cup in 2002. The game was planned to be expanded to Europe.

== Reception ==
Since its debut in 2002, it has sold 850 million player cards, as of 2016, making it the best-selling arcade digital collectible card game. As of 2020, a billion cards have been sold. At its peak, the game made a 100 million yen a day.

The game was released in 2005 in Europe, but royalty fees for the likenesses of the football players were far more expensive in Europe than in Japan. This made the game far too expensive and risky for western arcade owners.
