= Sega Ages =

- Logo for the Nintendo Switch series
- Developers: Sega, M2, 3D Ages, Sims
- Publisher: Sega
- Platforms: Sega Saturn, PlayStation 2, Xbox 360, PlayStation 3, Nintendo Switch

Sega Ages (Note: Japanese: セガエイジス, Hepburn: Sega Eijisu) is a series of video game ports, remakes, and compilations published by Sega. It consists of Sega arcade games and home console games, typically those for the Sega Genesis and Master System. The series was launched on the Sega Saturn in 1996. Entries were published for the PlayStation 2 as Sega Ages 2500, a reference to its ¥2500 price point. The series later came to the Xbox 360 and PlayStation 3 as Sega Ages Online, and finally to the Nintendo Switch as simply Sega Ages. The name Sega Ages is a palindrome, with "Ages" being "Sega" backwards — this was previously used by Sega in European marketing strategies from the late 1980s to early 1990s.

The Sega Saturn and PlayStation 2 releases usually feature a singular game alongside extras such as remakes or developer info, and sold at a low price point. Most of these releases were exclusive to Japan. Three games in the Sega Saturn series - Space Harrier, Out Run and After Burner II - were selected for Sega Ages Volume 1, released in Europe in 1996 and in North America in 1997. Several games in the PlayStation 2 series were released in Europe and North America as part of the Sega Classics Collection compilation in 2005. The PlayStation 2 series was initially developed by 3D Ages, a collaborative effort between Sega and D3 Publisher, but Sega would soon develop the games in-house following the departure of D3 Publisher from the project.

== Games ==
=== Sega Ages (Sega Saturn) ===
The first Sega Ages series was released in 1996 for the Sega Saturn in Japan and concluded in 1998. Although the majority of the titles in this series remained exclusive to Japan, three games from the line - Out Run, Space Harrier and After Burner II, would be compiled into the video game compilation Sega Ages Volume 1, released in Europe in 1996 by Sega itself and Sega Ages released in North America in 1997 by Working Designs under their Spaz imprint. Despite the title, no additional volumes would be released in these territories. Due to development technicalities at Working Designs, they had to make a sacrifice to Out Run by removing the original arcade music from the disc so that all three games could fit. The game would still contain the arrangement version of the music. Reasons for the removal are explained in the developer / translator notes at the back of the manual.

Title	Release date	Included games
Vol. 1 Syukudai ga Tant-R	JP: May 24, 1996	Puzzle & Action: Tant-R, Quiz Syukudai wo Wasuremashita
Vol. 2 Space Harrier^{†}	JP: August 9, 1996	Space Harrier
Vol. 3 Out Run^{†}	JP: September 20, 1996	Out Run
Vol. 4 After Burner II^{†}	JP: September 27, 1996	After Burner II
Vol. 5 Rouka ni Ichidant-R	JP: December 27, 1996	Puzzle & Action: Ichidant-R, Quiz Rouka ni Tattenasai!
Vol. 6 Fantasy Zone	JP: February 21, 1997	Fantasy Zone
Vol. 7 Memorial Selection Vol. 1	JP: February 28, 1997	Head-On, Pengo, Flicky, Up'n Down
Vol. 8 Columns Arcade Collection	JP: October 30, 1997	Columns, Columns II: The Voyage Through Time, Stack Columns, Columns '97
Vol. 9 Memorial Selection Vol. 2	JP: November 27, 1997	Samurai, Monaco GP, Star Jacker, Sindbad Mystery, Ninja Princess
Vol. 10 Power Drift	JP: February 26, 1998	Power Drift
Vol. 11 Phantasy Star Collection	JP: April 2, 1998	Phantasy Star, Phantasy Star II, Phantasy Star III, Phantasy Star IV
Vol. 12 Galaxy Force II	JP: July 2, 1998	Galaxy Force II
Vol. 13 I Love Mickey Mouse: Fushigi no Oshiro Daibouken/I Love Donald Duck: Guruzia Ou no Hihou	JP: October 15, 1998	Castle of Illusion Starring Mickey Mouse, QuackShot

^{†} = Released in North America as part of Sega Ages and Europe as part of Sega Ages Volume 1.

=== Sega Ages 2500 (PlayStation 2) ===
The second series was released for the PlayStation 2 in 2003 and concluding in 2008, known as the Sega Ages 2500 series - this title comes from the ¥2500 price point the game had. The series was created from Sega's interest in the success of D3 Publisher's Simple budget-title video game series, which features low-budget games at a low price point. This interest would lead to Sega and D3 Publisher forming a new subsidiary company in 2003, known as 3D Ages (スリーディー・エイジス/3Dエイジス, Surīdī Eijisu), with the sole reason to create games under the Sega Ages 2500 series. Later in 2004, D3 Publisher would leave the project and give Sega complete control of the company.

The main focus of the series was to remake older Sega video games with 3D visuals, alongside improved sound and gameplay. Following the departure of D3 Publisher, the series would soon shift into featuring compilations of other Sega video games alongside remakes of these games. The series officially concluded in 2008 after 33 entries, although several other Sega Ages 2500 games, featuring games such as Streets of Rage and Alex Kidd, were planned for release. 3D Ages was disbanded in late 2005 and absorbed into Sega.

Due to complications with Sony Computer Entertainment America, Sega was disallowed from releasing the games individually outside Japan. Instead, nine of the games in the Sega Ages 2500 series would be compiled into the Sega Classics Collection compilation for the PlayStation 2, released in North America by Sega in 2005 and in Europe by Conspiracy Entertainment in 2006.

Title	Release date	Included games
Vol. 1: Phantasy Star Generation: 1	JP: August 28, 2003^{‡}	Remake of Phantasy Star
Vol. 2: Monaco GP^{†}	JP: August 28, 2003	Remake of Monaco GP
Vol. 3: Fantasy Zone^{†}	JP: August 28, 2003	Remake of Fantasy Zone
Vol. 4: Space Harrier^{†}	JP: September 25, 2003	Remake of Space Harrier
Vol. 5: Golden Axe^{†}	JP: September 25, 2003	Remake of Golden Axe
Vol. 6: Ichini no Tant-R to Bonanza Bros.^{†}	JP: August 28, 2003^{‡}	Remakes of Bonanza Bros. and Puzzle & Action: Tant-R
Vol. 7: Columns^{†}	JP: January 25, 2004	Remake of Columns, built on the engine of Columns '97, with a Vs CPU mode similar to the single-player mode of Columns III.
Vol. 8: Virtual Racing FlatOut^{†}	JP: February 26, 2004	Remake of Virtua Racing
Vol. 9: Gain Ground	JP: February 26, 2004^{‡}	Remake of Gain Ground
Vol. 10: After Burner II	JP: March 25, 2004	Remake of After Burner II
Vol. 11: Hokuto no Ken	JP: March 25, 2004	Remake of Hokuto no Ken
Vol. 12: Puyo Puyo Tsuu Perfect Set	JP: May 24, 2004	Puyo Puyo 2
Vol. 13: Out Run^{†}	JP: May 27, 2004	Remake of Out Run
Vol. 14: Alien Syndrome^{†}	JP: July 9, 2004	Remake of Alien Syndrome
Vol. 15: DecAthlete Collection	JP: July 9, 2004	DecAthlete, Winter Heat, Virtua Athlete
Vol. 16: Virtua Fighter 2	JP: October 14, 2004	Virtua Fighter 2
Vol. 17: Phantasy Star Generation: 2	JP: March 24, 2005^{‡}	Remake of Phantasy Star II
Vol. 18: Dragon Force	JP: August 18, 2005^{‡}	Remake of Dragon Force
Vol. 19: Fighting Vipers	JP: August 28, 2005	Fighting Vipers
Vol. 20: Space Harrier II: Space Harrier Complete Collection	JP: October 27, 2005^{‡}	Space Harrier, Space Harrier (SMS), Space Harrier (GG), Space Harrier 3D, Space Harrier II, Sega Mark III error screen demo
Vol. 21: SDI & Quartet: Sega System 16 Collection	JP: October 27, 2005	SDI, Quartet
Vol. 22: Advanced Daisenryaku: Deutsch Dengeki Sakusen	JP: February 23, 2006	Remake of Advanced Daisenryaku
Vol. 23: Sega Memorial Selection	JP: December 22, 2006^{‡}	Head-On, Tranquilizer Gun, Borderline, Congo Bongo, Doki Doki Penguin Land, remakes of said games
Vol. 24: Last Bronx - Tokyo Bangaichi	JP: December 29, 2006	Last Bronx
Vol. 25: Gunstar Heroes Treasure Box	JP: February 23, 2006^{‡}	Gunstar Heroes, Gunstar Heroes (GG), Gunstar Heroes (prototype version), Dynamite Headdy, Alien Soldier, Dynamite Headdy (SMS), Dynamite Headdy (GG)
Vol. 26: Dynamite Deka	JP: April 27, 2007^{‡}	Remake of Dynamite Deka
Vol. 27: Panzer Dragoon	JP: April 27, 2007	Panzer Dragoon, remake of Panzer Dragoon
Vol. 28: Tetris Collection	JP: June 28, 2007	Tetris (Sega), Bloxeed, Flashpoint, Tetris New Century, Flashpoint (prototype)
Vol. 29: Monster World Complete Collection	JP: August 3, 2007	Wonder Boy (ARC, SMS, SG-1000, GG), Wonder Boy in Monster Land (ARC, SMS), Wonder Boy III: Monster Lair (ARC, SG), Wonder Boy III: The Dragon's Trap (GG, SMS), Monster World III (SG, SMS), Monster World IV
Vol. 30: Galaxy Force II: Special Extended Edition	JP: August 26, 2007^{‡}	Galaxy Force II, Galaxy Force II (SMS), Galaxy Force II (SG), Galaxy Force Neo Classic
Vol. 31: Cyber Troopers Virtual On	JP: October 25, 2007	Remake of Cyber Troopers: Virtual On
Vol. 32: Phantasy Star Complete Collection	JP: March 27, 2008^{‡}	Phantasy Star, Phantasy Star II, Phantasy Star III, Phantasy Star Gaiden, Phantasy Star Adventure, Phantasy Star IV, Phantasy Star Text Adventures
Vol. 33: Fantasy Zone Complete Collection	JP: September 11, 2008^{‡}	Fantasy Zone, Fantasy Zone II: The Tears of Opa-Opa, Fantasy Zone: The Maze, Super Fantasy Zone, Fantasy Zone II DX, Fantasy Zone Neo Classic, Galactic Protector, Fantasy Zone Gear

^{†} = Released in North America and Europe as part of Sega Classics Collection. Alien Syndrome was removed from the European release to lower the game's rating.

^{‡} = Re-released on PlayStation Network for PlayStation 3 in Japan.

=== Sega Ages Online (PlayStation 3 & Xbox 360) ===
The third series was both introduced and concluded in 2012. The games were developed by M2 as opposed to being made in-house by Sega. Eleven releases were made in total, making it the shortest of the Sega Ages series.

Title	Release date	Platform	Included games	Notes
Sega Classics Collection	WW: May 23, 2012	Xbox 360	Alex Kidd in Miracle World, Revenge of Shinobi, Super Hang-On	Released in North America and Europe as Sega Vintage Collection: Alex Kidd & Co.
Monster World Collection	WW: May 23, 2012	Xbox 360	Wonder Boy in Monster World, Wonder Boy in Monster Land, Monster World IV	Released in North America and Europe as Sega Vintage Collection: Monster World.
Golden Axe Collection	WW: May 30, 2012	Xbox 360	Golden Axe, Golden Axe II, Golden Axe III	Released in North America and Europe as Sega Vintage Collection: Golden Axe.
Bare Knuckle Collection	WW: May 30, 2012	Xbox 360	Streets of Rage, Streets of Rage 2, Streets of Rage 3	Released in North America and Europe as Sega Vintage Collection: Streets of Rage.
ToeJam & Earl Collection	WW: November 7, 2012	Xbox 360	ToeJam & Earl, ToeJam & Earl in Panic on Funkotron	Released in North America and Europe as Sega Vintage Collection: ToeJam & Earl.
Alex Kidd in Miracle World	May 23, 2012	PlayStation 3		
Revenge of Shinobi	May 23, 2012	PlayStation 3		
Super Hang-On	May 23, 2012	PlayStation 3		
Wonder Boy in Monster World	May 23, 2012	PlayStation 3		
Wonder Boy in Monster Land	May 23, 2012	PlayStation 3		
Monster World IV	May 23, 2012	PlayStation 3		

=== Sega Ages (Nintendo Switch) ===
The fourth Sega Ages series was released for the Nintendo Switch in September 2018, available through the Nintendo eShop storefront. This series was developed by M2, with lead producer Rieko Kodama from Sega. Although Sega said that games from the Sega Saturn and Dreamcast would be made available later on, the series concluded in Japan in August 2020 and concluded elsewhere in the following month without these, although Sega stated their intention to continue re-releasing older titles in other ways.

Title	Original system	Japanese release	Worldwide release
Sonic the Hedgehog	Sega Genesis/Arcade (Mega Play)	September 20, 2018	
Thunder Force IV	Sega Genesis (Note: Some additional features such as Kids mode were ported from the Sega Saturn version.)	September 20, 2018	
Phantasy Star	Master System (Note: The Hiragana/Katakana mixed mode was ported from the Sega Saturn version.)	October 31, 2018	December 13, 2018
Out Run	Arcade (OutRun) (Note: Some additional features or musics were ported from the Sega Genesis version and Nintendo 3DS version.)	November 29, 2018	January 10, 2019
Gain Ground	Arcade (System 24)	December 27, 2018	March 28, 2019
Alex Kidd in Miracle World	Master System (Note: Some additional features were ported from the PlayStation 3/Xbox 360 version.)	February 21, 2019	March 28, 2019
Puyo Puyo	Arcade (System C-2) (Note: Some additional features were ported from the Sega Genesis version.)	March 28, 2019	August 22, 2019
Virtua Racing	Arcade (Model 1)	April 25, 2019	June 27, 2019
Wonder Boy in Monster Land	Arcade (System 2)	May 30, 2019	June 27, 2019
Space Harrier	Arcade (Space Harrier) (Note: The port is based on the Nintendo 3DS version which ported "Haya Oh" boss from the Sega Master System version.)	June 27, 2019	August 22, 2019
Columns II (Columns is also included)	Columns II: Arcade (System C); Columns: Sega Genesis (Note: The port of Columns I is based on the PlayStation Vita port which was included in Ryū ga Gotoku 0: Free to Play Application for PlayStation Vita.)	August 8, 2019	October 17, 2019
Puzzle & Action: Ichidant-R	Arcade (System C-2)/Sega Genesis (Note: The Sega Genesis port of Ichidant-R includes the Quest, Compe and Free modes, all exclusive to the console at the time.)	September 26, 2019	October 17, 2019
Shinobi	Arcade (System 16)	October 31, 2019	January 23, 2020
Fantasy Zone	Arcade (System 16A) (Note: Some additional features were ported from the complete version of PS2 and the Nintendo 3DS version.)	November 28, 2019	January 23, 2020
Puyo Puyo 2	Arcade (System C-2)	January 16, 2020	February 20, 2020
Sonic the Hedgehog 2 (Knuckles in Sonic 2 is also included)	Sega Genesis (Note: In the original release, Knuckles in Sonic 2 could only be played by locking-on the Sonic 2 cartridge to a Sonic & Knuckles cartridge.)	February 13, 2020	February 20, 2020
G-LOC: Air Battle	Arcade (Y Board)	March 26, 2020	April 30, 2020
Thunder Force AC	Arcade (System C-2)	May 14, 2020	May 28, 2020
Herzog Zwei	Sega Genesis	August 27, 2020	September 24, 2020

== Reception ==
The first Sega Ages volume was a best-seller in the United Kingdom. Next Generation rated it three stars out of five, and considered it better than the Namco Museum series. GamePro gave it a negative review, saying that the three games in the collection "were never all that good to begin with", believing that the collection should have added other Sega games. The four reviewers of Electronic Gaming Monthly unanimously contended that the three included games were outstanding and praised their arcade-perfect recreations, though they felt the collection should have included more games and historical info, as other retro compilations of the time did. They gave it a 6.5 out of 10. Sega Saturn Magazine gave it a 91%, likewise praising the three included games and the quality of the conversions. Though they criticized that After Burner and Space Harrier were somewhat wasted since they had already received excellent ports for the Sega Mega Drive and Sega 32X, they felt the compilation was worth getting for Out Run alone.

== See also ==
- Sega Forever - similar series of releases made for iOS and Android devices.
- Sega 3D Reprint Archives - similar series of releases made for the Nintendo 3DS.
