= Galaxy Force =

1988 video game

- Japanese arcade flyer
- Developer: Sega R&D1
- Publisher: Sega
- Composers: Koichi Namiki; Katsuhiro Hayashi
- Platform: Arcade: Master System, Amiga, Amstrad CPC, Atari ST, Commodore 64, ZX Spectrum, FM Towns, Mega Drive/Genesis, Sega Saturn, PlayStation 2, mobile phone, Nintendo 3DS
- Release: April 1988: Arcade; JP: April 1988; EU: July 1988; NA: August 1988 Master System; NA: October 1989; EU: 1989 Amiga, Atari ST, C64, CPC, ZX Spectrum; EU: January 1990 FM Towns; JP: 1990 Mega Drive/Genesis; JP: September 13, 1991; NA: January 1992; PAL: 1992 Saturn; JP: July 2, 1998 PlayStation 2; JP: July 26, 2007 Mobile; JP: June 2, 2008 Nintendo 3DS; JP: July 24, 2013; NA/EU: December 12, 2013
- Genre: Rail shooter
- Mode: Single-player
- Arcade system: Sega Y Board

Galaxy Force (Note: Japanese: ギャラクシーフォース, Hepburn: Gyarakushī Fōsu) is a 1988 rail shooter video game developed and published by Sega for arcades. The player assumes control of a starship named the TRY-Z, as it must prevent the Fourth Empire from taking over the entire galaxy. Gameplay involves shooting down enemies using either a laser shot or a limited supply of heat-seeking missiles, all while avoiding collision with projectiles or obstacles and making sure the ship's energy meter doesn't fully deplete. It ran on the Sega Y Board arcade system, and was released with a motion simulator cockpit arcade cabinet like previous Sega Super Scaler games (Space Harrier, After Burner and Thunder Blade).

Created by the same group of developers that later went on to form Sega AM1, Galaxy Force was largely inspired by Star Wars, and was developed specifically to show off the capabilities of the Sega Y hardware with its usage of large, detailed backgrounds and massive amount of on-screen sprites. The soundtrack was composed jointly by Katsuhiro Hayashi and Kouichi Namaki, both of whom had previously created the music for Thunder Blade. The game came in three different cabinet styles; a standard upright, a "Deluxe" machine, and a "Super Deluxe" version that could twist and turn the player around. Almost immediately after the game's release, Sega published an updated version titled Galaxy Force II which added two new levels and other minor additions.

Galaxy Force was critically acclaimed, being praised for its graphics, gameplay, presentation, music and hardware capabilities, considered to be visually impressive for the time period. It was ported to several platforms, including the Master System, Mega Drive/Genesis and Commodore 64, and released under several different Sega classic game re-release labels such as Sega Ages. A high-definition remake titled Galaxy Force Neo Classic was released for the PlayStation 2 in Galaxy Force II Special Extended Edition, alongside the original, which featured smoothed-out graphics and additional visual effects. With the exception of the Master System version, all home versions of the game are based on Galaxy Force II.

== Gameplay ==
Arcade version screenshot

Galaxy Force is a third-person rail shooter video game. The player assumes control of a starship named the TRY-Z, in its mission to vanquish the Fourth Empire before they take over the entire galaxy. Gameplay involves maneuvering the TRY-Z through six different stages, referred to as "worlds" in-game, all while shooting down incoming enemies and avoiding collision with either them, their projectiles, or an obstacle such as a wall. The TRY-Z is equipped with two weapons to destroy enemies; a standard laser shot, and a limited supply of heat-seeking missiles that automatically track down targets. Additional missiles can be found throughout specific portions of levels. A shield is displayed at the bottom left of the screen that will deplete should the TRY-Z collide with an obstacle or projectile. The TRY-Z has an energy meter at the bottom of the screen that depletes as the level progresses; energy is decreased by firing weapons and coming into contact with obstacles or projectiles. When the energy meter is fully depleted, the game will end.

== Development and release ==
Created as part of Sega's "Super Scaler" line of arcade games, which also included games such as Out Run and Space Harrier, Galaxy Force was designed specifically to show off the Sega Y Board arcade system, showcasing graphical features such as rotating scrolling backgrounds and many on-screen sprites. Development of the game was handled by a group of developers that later went on to form Sega AM1, and was in production alongside Yu Suzuki's Power Drift. Three cabinet versions of the game were produced; a standard upright cabinet, a "Deluxe" machine, and a "Super Deluxe" version that could twist and turn 335 degrees left and right, and move forwards and backwards at 15 degrees. The Super Deluxe version also included a headphone jack. The music in Galaxy Force was composed jointly by Katsuhiro Hayashi and Kouichi Namaki, both of whom previously worked on the soundtrack for Thunder Blade. The game was largely inspired by Star Wars, containing several subtle references in-game through its stage design.

Galaxy Force was released into arcades by Sega in April 1988 in Japan, and later that year in both North America and Europe. The Deluxe version cost £10,000 or $18,000 (equivalent to $49,000 in 2025), while the Super Deluxe version cost £17,000 or $30,000 (equivalent to $82,000 in 2025).

=== Galaxy Force II ===
Two months after the game was released, Sega published Galaxy Force II as a conversion kit; it is not a sequel, but rather an updated version of the original that adds two new levels, corrects many difficulty balance problems, and allows the player to fire all four missiles at once instead of one at a time. Almost all home releases of Galaxy Force are based on Galaxy Force II; the first of these was released in 1990 for the FM Towns, followed by a port for the Sega Genesis; both of these were developed by Japanese company CRI Middleware. A version for the Master System was also released, which was published by Sega in Europe and by Activision in North America. The Master System port was completely redone to accommodate for the console's technical limitations, bearing a much closer resemblance to Space Harrier, and is the only port not to be based on Galaxy Force II. Galaxy Force was also ported to several home computers, including the ZX Spectrum, Commodore 64, Atari ST and Amstrad.

In 1998, Galaxy Force II was released for the Sega Saturn as part of the Sega Ages series of classic game re-releases, including a brief background on the game's story and the ability to watch a pre-recorded playthrough. A PlayStation 2 version was released in Japan in 2007 under the Sega Ages 2500 brand, developed by M2 and titled Galaxy Force II: Special Extended Edition. It includes the arcade, Master System and Genesis versions of the original, alongside a new "Neo Classic" remake that features smooth, enhanced graphics, transparency effects and visual cues. Special Extended Edition also allows the player to select either the original or FM Towns version soundtracks, gain access to a cheat menu, and arranged music tracks. A version for Japanese mobile phones was published in 2008. The Sega Genesis version was digitally re-released for the Wii Virtual Console in 2009. In 2013, Galaxy Force II was ported to the Nintendo 3DS by M2 under the 3D Classics brand, renamed 3D Galaxy Force II and supporting the system's 3D display. This version was later compiled into Sega 3D Classics Collection in 2016.

According to Sonic the Hedgehog creator Yuji Naka, Michael Jackson was given a Galaxy Force arcade cabinet as a gift during his visit to Sega's offices in Japan. The machine was later sold off in early 2009 when his Neverland Ranch was foreclosed.

== Reception ==
Reception

Review scores
Publication	Score
Computer and Video Games	91% (Master System)
Electronic Gaming Monthly	23/40 (Master System)
Eurogamer	8/10 (3DS)
Nintendo Life	8/10 (3DS)
Nintendo World Report	9/10 (3DS)
Sinclair User	10/10 (Arcade)
Commodore User	8/10 (Arcade)
Console XS	86% (Master System)
Mean Machines	59% (Mega Drive)
RePlay	Positive (Arcade)
Sega Saturn Magazine	6/10 (Saturn)
The One	Positive (Arcade)

Award
Publication	Award
Sinclair User	Shoot 'Em Up of the Year

The January 15, 1989 issue of trade publication Game Machine listed it as the thirteenth most-popular coin-operated arcade game in Japan at the time. In North America, it was an arcade hit; it was one of the highest-earning games at a number of arcades through 1990, and the top-earner at some arcades, but the game was not widely available at most American arcades.

Galaxy Force was critically acclaimed by a number of publications, and is seen among Sega's best arcade games of the era. In late 1988, Sinclair User gave the game the "Shoot 'Em Up of the Year" award for its impressive graphics and hardware.

Several critics commented on the game's visuals. Commodore User found the arcade game's visuals to be much more detailed than those in Sega's previous game After Burner, and applauded them for being stunning and impressive. Sinclair User agreed, arguing that it usurps Thunder Blade in its graphics. TheOne magazine also liked the visuals. Reviewing the Nintendo 3DS version, Nintendo World Report commented on the graphics for being impressive for a 2D game, which Nintendo Life and Eurogamer agreed with. Nintendo Life also added that the graphics of Galaxy Force present "a tantalizing glimpse into what interactive entertainment could have looked like had polygons never happened". Mean Machines was critical of the graphics in the Sega Mega Drive conversion, saying that they only looked good when the player was moving in a straight direction. Mean Machines also disliked the port's "crummy" sound effects and mediocre presentation.

Galaxy Force was widely praised for its gameplay. While The One said that it felt "more of a simulator than a game", they liked its fast-paced action. Both Commodore User and Sinclair User commended the gameplay of Galaxy Force for its focus on speed, with Sinclair User saying that it was "possibly the most mind-blowingly impressive arcade game" of the time. Nintendo Life labeled the 3DS version as "arguably the culmination of M2's 3D Classics range" for its great gameplay and overall challenge, adding that it was a great conversion of the game overall. Nintendo World Report, who felt it was the best of the 3D Classics lineup, agreed and said that its extra features made it the best way to play the game. Mean Machines lampooned the Genesis version further for its gameplay and poor job at converting the arcade version for the system, alongside its sluggish pace and overall lack of any real challenge. Sega Saturn Magazine liked the Sega Saturn version for its great effort at converting the game for the Saturn hardware and was still a fun game, but its lack of any real additional extras made it somewhat of a hard sell for consumers.

Retrospectively, Hardcore Gaming 101 applauded Galaxy Force for its visuals, gameplay and overall presentation. Although they felt the game felt more like an amusement ride than a game, and was too difficult at times, they liked the game for being impressive for its time, writing: "Galaxy Force is still an incredibly impressive feat of programming, a work of art in its own way". In his book The Sega Arcade Revolution, Ken Horowitz commented on the game's graphics, presentation and technological capabilities, saying that Galaxy Force "remains a prime example of the company at its best, combining gameplay and presentation into one of the more memorable arcade experiences".
