= Bonanza Bros. =

1990 video game

- Japanese arcade flyer
- Developer: Sega
- Publishers: Sega (arcade/consoles); U.S. Gold (computers)
- Composer: Koichi Namiki
- Platform: Arcade: Amstrad CPC, Atari ST, Commodore 64, Amiga, Master System, PC Engine/TurboGrafx-CD, Mega Drive/Genesis, X68000, ZX Spectrum
- Release: June 1990: Arcade; JP: June 1990; NA: August 1990 Mega Drive/Genesis; JP: May 17, 1991; NA: November 1991; EU: November 11, 1991 X68000; JP: October 18, 1991 Mobile phones; JP: December 31, 2002; EU: February 2, 2007
- Genres: Stealth, platform, shooter
- Modes: Single player, multiplayer
- Arcade system: Sega System 24

Bonanza Bros. (Note: Japanese: ボナンザブラザーズ, Hepburn: Bonanza Burazāzu) (sometimes written Bonanza Brothers) is a side-scrolling stealth action game developed and released by Sega in 1990. It is one of the earliest arcade games powered by the Sega System 24 arcade system board. It was ported to various home systems, including the Mega Drive/Genesis, Master System, PC-Engine/TurboGrafx-CD, and several home computers.

Bonanza Bros. received praise for its graphics, soundtrack, and character dialogue. It has been remastered and rereleased several times.

== Gameplay ==
Arcade screenshot

Bonanza Bros. is a side-scrolling stealth action game, with shooter and platform game elements. The players take the roles of one or both of the brothers Robo (1P, red) and Mobo (2P, blue) (Mike and Spike in some PAL versions), who may have been modeled on The Blues Brothers. The object of the game is to travel stealthily around each building while avoiding guards, retrieve several objects within a time limit, and move to the roof where a blimp is expecting the player with the loot. In this fashion the plot and gameplay resemble the Atari 2600 game Keystone Kapers, but with additional features similar to ones in Lock 'n' Chase. Two players can play cooperatively at the same time, as the screen is always split in two.

The places the brothers burgle include a bank, a millionaire's mansion, a casino, a mint, an art gallery and a treasury. While similar in graphics and gameplay, the story and the Bonanza Bros.' role changes from the original Japanese to the early western versions: in the former, the duo are thieves attempting to steal valuable treasures for profit whilst avoiding getting arrested; in the latter, they are recruited by the Police Chief of Badville to test security facilities and help the police recover evidence from various crooked businesses and institutions, but on the threat of jail if they fail to do so.

The player can walk, jump, shoot and move behind a column or large furniture, which allows both hiding and dodging shots from the guards, who can only be stunned for a few seconds with the gun or by slamming a door on them. They are alerted by sounds or with the Brothers entering their field of vision, and then either hide, call for help or fire against the player. Some guards have a riot shield and can only be hit when moving away. A player loses a life if hit by a guard's projectile or melee attack, attacked by a dog, pressed by a door, or by failing to make a jump onto a springboard or zipline and landing stuck in the ground. Losing a life in these ways causes the player to drop all items. Running out of time both costs players a life and forces them to restart the stage.

== Development ==
According to Sega, they used "top-flight computer graphics" to "create super-vivid characters and scenes" for the game.

== Ports ==
The arcade game was ported to the Sega Mega Drive, Master System, TurboGrafx-CD (Japan only), ZX Spectrum (Europe only), Amstrad CPC (Europe only), Commodore 64, Amiga, X68000 (Japan only) and Atari ST, with minor graphics differences, depending on the system, and some changes in the gameplay, mainly in the bonus stages.

== Reception ==
Reception

Review scores
Publication	Score
AllGame	3.5/5 (Genesis)
Computer and Video Games	83% (Arcade)
Sinclair User	76% (Arcade)
Console XS	90% (Master System); 78% (Genesis)
MegaTech	73% (Mega Drive)
Mega Zone	90% (Mega Drive)
RePlay	Positive (Arcade)

Game Machine listed Bonanza Bros. on their July 15, 1990 issue as being the third most popular arcade game in Japan at that point.

Julian Rignall of Computer and Video Games praised the arcade game's originality and "stunning" graphics, calling it a "rather nerve-wracking game of hide and seek" and "a very different sort of game that taxes your brains rather than your reflexes." Sinclair User recommended the arcade game to those who like the use of planning and timing rather than sheer speed of reaction.

Mega Zone magazine enjoyed the Mega Drive version for its usage of digitized speech, stating, "The best thing about this game though is it's witty. The whole idea is clever and the way the characters act is like an old Laurel and Hardy or Keystone cops movie." MegaTech said the two player mode action is fun but does not have challenge, giving criticism to the game's difficulty for being too easy. Console XS praised the genesis version saying it has a very decent presentation and neat graphics and they criticized the game's difficulty being very easy.

Gamesradar ranked Bonanza Bros. at #47 in their "Best Sega Genesis/Mega Drive games of all time".

== Legacy ==
It was included in the Japanese version of Sonic Gems Collection (it was removed in the Western release). It has also seen a Sega Ages release on the PlayStation 2, and that version was included in the English compilation Sega Classics Collection. The game appeared as part of the Sega Genesis Collection for the PlayStation 2 and PlayStation Portable. The game next appeared in Sonic's Ultimate Genesis Collection for Xbox 360 and PlayStation 3. The game is also playable in Sega Genesis Classics for PlayStation 4, Xbox One, Nintendo Switch and PC.

There are also three spin-offs to the game. The first is called Puzzle & Action: Tant-R which was released in the year 1992, the second called Puzzle & Action: Ichidant-R, which was released in the year 1994. These two arcade games were ported to the Sega Mega Drive and Sega Saturn, and later packaged with the Sega Ages release of Bonanza Bros. on the PlayStation 2. They are considered spin-offs as they do not follow the action genre of the original game, as they are instead puzzle games. A third arcade game, Puzzle & Action: Treasure Hunt, was released in 1995 by Sega and ported to the Sega Saturn in Japan by CRI.

Bonanza Bros. was also included in Sonic Gems Collection but only for the Japanese Market. Due to its violent content, it was removed from the US and PAL releases along with the Streets of Rage series in order to preserve its universal rating. However, Bonanza Bros. made its first appearance on the recent Sega Genesis Collection for the PS2 in North America as the PS2 version of Sonic Gems Collection remains in Japan and Europe.

On January 29, 2007, the Mega Drive/Genesis version of Bonanza Bros. became available for download on the Wii Virtual Console in America. It was later released in Europe on February 2, 2007. It was also released for cell phones using SoftBank Mobile.

The title was referenced in Danganronpa 2: Goodbye Despair.

Robo and Mobo, the protagonists of Bonanza Bros., appear as playable characters in Sonic & Sega All-Stars Racing, and made a cameo on the "Race of AGES" racetrack in Sonic & All-Stars Racing Transformed.

A "Bonanza Bros." slot machine has been released by Aristocrat Leisure.
