= Sky Target =

1995 video game

- Developer: Sega
- Publisher: Sega
- Platforms: Arcade, Sega Saturn, Microsoft Windows
- Release: Arcade: JP: October 1995; NA: February 1996; Sega Saturn: JP: April 25, 1997; EU: June 5, 1997; NA: July 1997; PC: JP: August 14, 1997
- Genre: Flight simulator/Shoot 'em up
- Mode: Single player
- Arcade system: Sega Model 2

Sky Target (スカイターゲット, Sukai Tāgetto) is a 1995 combat flight simulator arcade game developed and published by Sega. Featuring a number of planes including the default F-14D Super Tomcat, it is best remembered for its semi-official connection to Sega's earlier hit After Burner. Although never billed as a sequel, its overt similarities to the 1987 classic were nonetheless referenced in official promotional materials and recognized by the media. Plus, it features a revised version of the "After Burner" music theme within its soundtrack.

In 1997, Sky Target was ported to Sega Saturn by external developer Appaloosa Interactive. The port retains the gameplay of the original but has completely redone cutscenes, a difficulty select option, and a new Ranking Mode. This version was also later released for Microsoft Windows exclusively in Japan.

== Gameplay ==
Like After Burner, Sky Target places players in control of a modern fighter jet. Players can select from four planes: the F-14D Super Tomcat, Rafale M, F-16C, and F-15S/MTD. The camera follows in chase view (with two selectable follow distances), and players control movement with an analog flight stick. As in After Burner, moving the reticule over a target allows the player to lock on (denoted by a voice shouting "Fire!") and fire homing missiles.

Unlike After Burner II, there is no throttle to control speed, nor an ability to barrel roll. After certain stages, players may have a choice of two different stages, an element later revisited in After Burner Climax. Also unlike After Burner, Sky Target has large, sci-fi-inspired bosses that must be destroyed in a set amount of time in order to receive a score bonus.

In the Saturn version's Ranking Mode, each level is played individually, and players are graded on their performance. Sufficiently strong performances are rewarded with promotions, which unlock additional levels in the Ranking Mode, though there are no levels beyond those included in the regular game.

== Reception ==
Reception

Review scores
Publication	Score
AllGame	2.5/5 (SAT)
Computer and Video Games	2/5 (ARC)
Electronic Gaming Monthly	4.75/10 (SAT) (Note: Sushi-X and Dan Hsu each gave a score of 4/10, Shawn Smith gave a score of 6/10, and Crispin Boyer gave a score of 5/10.)
Famitsu	26/40
Game Informer	5/10 (SAT)
GameFan	70% (SAT) (Note: Three critics of GameFan gave the Saturn version each a score of 65, 68, and 77.)
Next Generation	2/5 (ARC); 1/5 (SAT)
Sega Saturn Magazine	73% (SAT)

Sky Target was negatively received by critics. Reviewing the arcade version, Next Generation called the game "a fancy-shmantzy remake of After Burner, and a lot less fun". The reviewer praised the visuals for their cutting edge level of detail, lack of draw in, and strong design, but said the gameplay is so simplistic and repetitive that the average player will have mastered it by the end of the first two levels. He noted that the game was even simpler than its predecessor After Burner, since it lacks a means of controlling acceleration. In spite of the negative reception, Japan's Game Machine listed the game on their December 1, 1995 issue as the fourth most-successful dedicated arcade game of the month.

The Saturn version was also primarily criticized for its generally shallow gameplay, and limited controls, which a Next Generation critic summed up by saying that the player's plane "acts more like a targeting icon than a pilotable craft." GamePro concluded, "Sky Target might have made a decent arcade game a decade ago, but it certainly won't do anything to calm all those Saturn owners worrying about the system's future." (Note: GamePro gave the Saturn version 3.0/5 for graphics, 3.0/5 for fun factor, 3.5/5 for sound, and 4.0/5 for control.) In Japan, Famitsu gave it a score of 26 out of 40.

Most critics also disapproved of the Saturn version's graphics. GamePro described them as "only marginally better" than After Burner (which was by then a decade old), and Ken "Sushi-X" Williams of Electronic Gaming Monthly said they "are fast and furious, but look rough and blocky in spots. Although it isn't a big distraction, it gives the game an unpolished feel." Sushi-X's co-reviewer Crispin Boyer and Lee Nutter of Sega Saturn Magazine both said the huge bosses are impressive. The music was derided; Nutter described it as "standard soft-rock tunes occasionally interrupted by a deranged keyboard player on speed" and EGM's Dan Hsu and Crispin Boyer called it "corny" and "ridiculous".

== See also ==
- After Burner
