= Super Thunder Blade =

1988 video game

- European box art
- Developer: Sega
- Publisher: Sega
- Producer: Yuji Naka
- Composer: Sachio Ogawa
- Platform: Mega Drive/Genesis
- Release: JP: October 29, 1988; NA: August 1989; EU: September 1990
- Genre: Rail shooter
- Mode: Single-player

Super Thunder Blade (Note: Japanese language: スーパーサンダーブレード, Hepburn romanization: Supā Sandā Burēdo) is a 1988 rail shooter game developed and published by Sega for the Sega Genesis. It sees players controlling a helicopter as they gun down military vehicles in various different environments. The sequel to the 1987 arcade game Thunder Blade, the gameplay of Super Thunder Blade follows the structure set by its arcade predecessor, with every stage featuring traditional rail shooting segment ending off with a vertically scrolling shoot 'em up boss battle.

The game was later released for the Virtual Console on September 17, 2007, and on the Nintendo Classics service on April 11, 2025. It was also included in the Sega Genesis Collection for PlayStation 2 and PlayStation Portable in 2006 and in Sonic's Ultimate Genesis Collection for Xbox 360 and PlayStation 3 in 2009.

== Plot ==
Although the battle against the guerilla forces supported directly from Country S was won, with the enemy’s assault staved off, many of the guerillas survived, while Thunder Blade was lost as a result of the fighting while its pilot, Captain Lantz Goswork of Country A, was left injured. Despite this, however, a new combat helicopter is developed by Country A called “Super Thunder Blade” to tackle emerging threats, with Captain Lantz at the helm once again.

== Gameplay ==
Super Thunder Blade is a rail shooter game. As in its predecessor, the player takes control of a helicopter which is used to attack a group of guerrillas. The helicopter itself uses guns and missiles, and can also air brake. A distinctive feature that also appears in the arcade game is the use of different viewpoints during normal gameplay and when fighting sub-bosses. The game utilizes a third-person perspective from behind the helicopter, similar to Space Harrier, but the camera changes to a top-down perspective when fighting bosses. The game has four stages to play.

== Reception ==
Reception

Review scores
Publication	Score
ACE	88/100
Computer and Video Games	8/10
IGN	4/10
Computer Entertainer	8/8 stars

The game received positive reviews upon release. ACE magazine rated it 880 out of 1000 and listed it as one of the top five best games available for the Mega Drive in 1989. Computer and Video Games rated it 80% and called it the "best version" of Thunder Blade on "any" system.

The game later received mixed retrospective reviews in the 2000s. In 2007, IGN gave the game a 4 out of 10, citing a framerate that was "far too jumpy" and lamenting that the game "just couldn't make the jump to console" from its arcade cabinet counterpart.
