= Galaxy Force (disambiguation) =

Galaxy Force may refer to:

- Galaxy Force (video game), a 3D shooter video game by Sega, also released by Activision for many home computers
- Transformers: Galaxy Force, the 16th Transformers animated series (Transformers: Cybertron in United States)
- Power Rangers: Galaxy Force, an animated Super Sentai and Power Rangers television series
