= Planet Harriers =

2000 video game

- Developer: Amusement Vision
- Publisher: Sega
- Director: Toshihiro Nagoshi
- Producer: Toshihiro Nagoshi
- Designer: Junichi Yamada
- Programmer: Tetsuya Kaku
- Artist: Mika Kojima
- Composers: Shunsuke Suzuki; Toshiyuki Kishi
- Series: Space Harrier
- Platform: Arcade
- Release: JP: December 2000; NA/EU: 2001
- Genres: Rail shooter, third-person shooter
- Modes: Single-player, multiplayer
- Arcade system: Sega Hikaru

Planet Harriers (Japanese: プラネットハリアーズ, Hepburn: Puranetto Hariāzu) is a 3D rail shooter arcade video game published by Sega, developed by its Amusement Vision division. It is part of the Space Harrier series. It was produced both as a sit-down twin cabinet and a stand-up single cabinet.

== Gameplay ==
The game is based around a twin cabinet, which allows for two seated players to play simultaneous single-player games, or a networked two-player game. Control is through a joystick with a missile and bullet trigger, and view-change and bomb buttons on the main panel.

A player may select one of four characters: Glenn, X, Cory, or Nick. The character flies from an into-the-screen perspective, shooting oncoming enemies and missiles. In a two player game, the two characters may dock together in order to recover life.

Opa-Opa appears spinning above a defeated player offering a continue. This character is made playable with the Easter egg of moving the player selection over X, then Nick, Cory, Glenn, Cory, Nick, Cory, Glenn, X, Cory and then Glenn again.

== Reception ==
In September 2000, IGN described Planet Harrier, running on the Sega Hikaru arcade system board, as "the unrivaled champion of videogame graphics ... there's never been as visually impressive a videogame as this", praising the long draw distance, "clean and crisp" image quality, speed of movement, large number of fast-moving objects, and "amazing" graphical style. They also praised the gameplay as "the fastest, most intense 3D shooter ever crafted". In Japan, the February 1, 2001 issue of Game Machine lists it as the eleventh most-successful dedicated arcade game of the month. A rumored GameCube port never materialized.

== See also ==
- Cyber Troopers Virtual-On Force, based on the same arcade system
