= After Burner =

1987 video game

- Japanese arcade flyer
- Developer: Studio 128
- Publisher: Sega
- Director: Yu Suzuki
- Programmers: Yu Suzuki; Satoshi Mifune
- Composer: Hiroshi Kawaguchi
- Series: After Burner
- Platform: Arcade: After Burner Arcade, Master System After Burner II 32X, Arcade, Amstrad CPC, Atari ST, Commodore 64, ZX Spectrum, MSX, Amiga, FM Towns, NES, X68000, MS-DOS, Video Challenger, Mega Drive/Genesis, PC Engine, Sega Saturn
- Release: July 1987: After Burner Arcade; JP: July 1987; EU: September 1987; NA: October 1987 Master System; JP: December 12, 1987; NA/EU: March 1988 After Burner II Arcade September 1987 Atari ST, C64, CPC, ZX Spectrum, MSX; EU: November 1988 Amiga; EU: December 1988 NES; JP: March 30, 1989; NA: December 1989 MS-DOS; NA: September 1989 X68000; JP: 1989 Mega Drive/Genesis; JP: March 23, 1990; NA: July 1990; EU: 1990 PC Engine; JP: September 28, 1990 Saturn; JP: September 27, 1996
- Genre: Combat flight simulation
- Mode: Single-player
- Arcade system: Sega X Board

After Burner (Note: Japanese: アフターバーナー, Hepburn: Afutā Bānā) is a 1987 combat flight simulation video game developed by Studio 128 and published by Sega for arcades. The player controls an American F-14 Tomcat fighter jet and must clear each of the game's 18 stages by destroying enemies. The plane is equipped with a machine gun and a limited supply of heat-seeking missiles. The game uses a third-person perspective, as in Sega's earlier Space Harrier (1985) and Out Run (1986). It runs on the Sega X Board arcade system which is capable of surface and sprite rotation. It is the fourth Sega game to use a hydraulic "taikan" motion simulator arcade cabinet, one that is more elaborate than their earlier "taikan" simulator games. The cabinet simulates an aircraft cockpit, with flight stick controls, a chair with seatbelt, and hydraulic motion technology that moves, tilts, rolls and rotates the cockpit in sync with the on-screen action.

Designed by Sega veteran Yu Suzuki, After Burner was intended to be Sega's first "true blockbuster" video game. Development began in December 1986, shortly after the completion of Out Run, and was kept as a closely guarded secret within the company. Suzuki was inspired by the 1986 films Top Gun and Laputa: Castle in the Sky; he originally planned for the game to have an aesthetic similar to Laputa, but went with a Top Gun look to make the game approachable for worldwide audiences. It was designed outside the company in a building named "Studio 128", because Sega had a flextime schedule to allow games to be worked on outside company headquarters. An updated version with the addition of throttle controls, After Burner II, was released later the same year.

After Burner was a worldwide commercial success, becoming Japan's second highest-grossing large arcade game of 1987 and overall arcade game of 1988 as well as among America's top five highest-grossing dedicated arcade games of 1988. Critics praised its impressive visuals, gameplay and overall presentation; it was described as important and influential. It was followed by a series of sequels and ports for many platforms, including the Master System, ZX Spectrum, and Famicom. Sega produced several successors, including G-LOC: Air Battle. After Burner has been alluded to in many other Sega video games, such as Fighters Megamix, Shenmue, and Bayonetta.

== Gameplay ==
Arcade version

The game allows the player to control an F-14 Tomcat jet airplane. At the start of the game, the player takes off from an aircraft carrier called the SEGA Enterprise on a mission to destroy enemy jets over 18 stages.

In the arcade version, the jet employs a machine gun and a limited number of heat-seeking missiles (in the Master System version the player has unlimited missiles). These weapons are replenished by another aircraft, after beating a few stages. The aircraft, cannon and missile buttons are controlled from an integrated flight stick.

The game was released in two variations in the US: a standard upright cabinet and a closed, rotating-cockpit deluxe version. In the cockpit version, the seat tilted forward and backwards, and the cockpit rotated from side to side. It featured two speakers at head-level for stereo sound, and had a seatbelt to hold the player when the cockpit moved. Both cabinets contained a grey monitor frame with flashing lights at the top that indicated an enemy's "lock" on the player's craft. Japan also received a commander cabinet that moved left and right. A third variation, called commander, released elsewhere, featured an open cabinet.

== Development and release ==
After Burner was designed by Yu Suzuki, with assistance from programmer Satoshi Mifune and composer Hiroshi "Hiro" Kawaguchi. Development of the game began in early December 1986, shortly after Out Run was completed, with much of the development team having worked on Out Run. After Burner was intended to be Sega's first "true blockbuster" video game; the project was a closely guarded secret within the company during its development. When the game was in its initial concept stages, Sega had adopted a flextime work system, allowing development of games to be done outside the company; After Burner was one of the first games to be produced under this new system, with development taking place in a building named Studio 128.

Suzuki was inspired by the film Laputa: Castle in the Sky and initially wanted to use a similar aesthetic for After Burner, but this idea was scrapped early on in favor of a style akin to the movie Top Gun, as Suzuki wanted the game more approachable for a worldwide audience. The game was programmed and tested on a PC-98 system, making it the first Sega-published video game to be developed using personal computers rather than workstations.

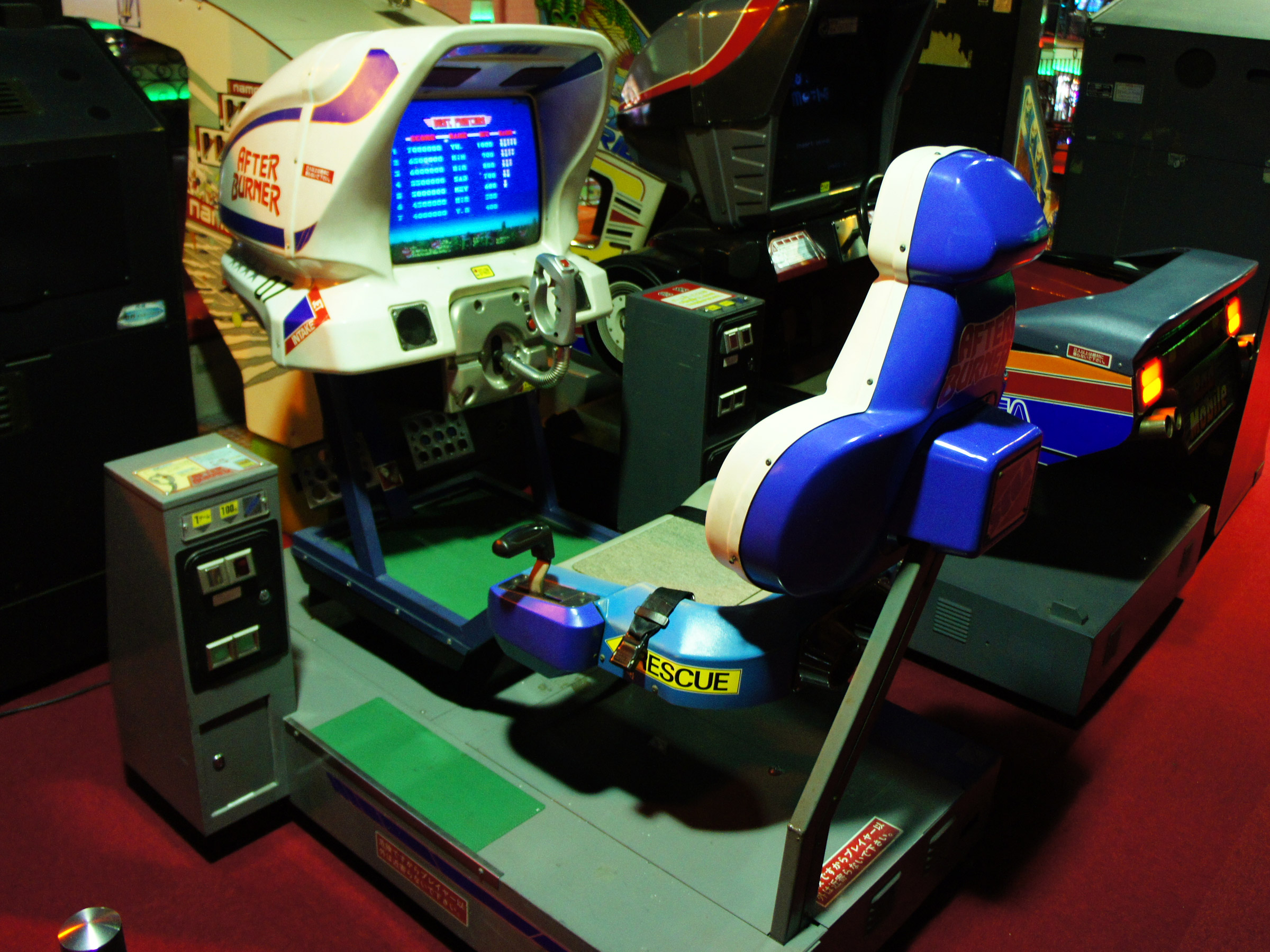
The interior parts of a commander sit-down arcade cabinet for After Burner

The game developers created several ground-breaking techniques, including for sprite and surface rotation and the smoke trails made by firing missiles. Unlike their earlier game Out Run, which featured real-world locations in its levels, Suzuki lacked the time to visit any specific places or landmarks, so he and his team made up their own stage settings. Suzuki toyed with the idea of having the Soviet Union as the antagonists to increase sales in the West, but decided against it after struggling to tie it together with the game's level designs and settings. The refueling and landing sequences were created to add variety.

The After Burner arcade cabinet was more expensive than most of Sega's other machines at the time. The first prototype unit consisted of the monitor attached to a steel frame. Mifune said it had "amazing power", but was considered too dangerous to operate and had the power levels lowered. Suzuki also thought of the game using a gyroscopic arcade cabinet that spun the player around, an idea that later became the R-360. A throttle control was briefly considered, but was abandoned as making the game too difficult to play. It uses the Sega X Board, which was also used for games such as Thunder Blade (1987) and Super Monaco GP (1989). After Burner was officially released in Japan in July 1987, and in October of that year in North America. In Europe, it was released in September 1987, with the hydraulic sit-in cabinet costing £4,000, or $6,500 (equivalent to $18,000 in 2025), in the United Kingdom.

Suzuki wanted to add throttle controls to the game, but balancing issues and looming deadlines led to the development team scrapping the feature. After the original game was released, they developed an updated version, After Burner II, in order to fulfill their original vision and add the feature amongst other upgrades. After Burner II has been ported to numerous home systems: PC Engine, X68000, Mega Drive/Genesis, Famicom, FM Towns Marty, Atari ST, Amiga, Amstrad CPC, Commodore 64, and Saturn. The game was rebuilt with stereoscopic 3D feature as one of the 3D Classics for Nintendo 3DS.

== Reception ==
Reception

Review scores
Publication	Score					
Publication	Arcade	C64	Master System	PC	Sega Genesis	ZX
Computer Gaming World			Positive	4.5/5		
Crash						86%
Computer and Video Games	Positive		9/10			
GameFan					232/300 (32X)	
GamePro					15.5/20 (32X)	
Sinclair User	8/10					90%
The Games Machine (UK)	Positive					
Your Sinclair	Positive					
Zzap!64		17%				
Console XS			85%			
Top Score	Positive					

Awards
Publication	Award
1987 Gamest Awards	Best Graphics (1st); Game of the Year (2nd); Most Popular Game (3rd); Best VGM (4th); Best Ending (6th); Best Sound Synthesis (8th)
1988 AMOA Games Awards	Most Innovative Game
1988 Gamest Awards	Special Award
Computer and Video Games	C+VG Hit

=== Arcade ===
Game Machine listed After Burner as the most popular arcade game of August 1987 in Japan, where it went on to be the second highest-grossing large arcade game of 1987 (just below Out Run) and the overall highest-grossing arcade game of 1988. In the United States, it was one of the top five highest-grossing dedicated arcade games of 1988, and remained a top ten earner at various arcades through 1990. In the United Kingdom, it was the top-grossing arcade game upon release in September 1987.

The arcade game received positive reviews from critics. Clare Edgeley of Computer and Video Games called it a "fabulous game" with praise for the gameplay and motion cabinet while noting it has a lock-on mechanic similar to the Data East arcade game Lock-On (1986). Top Score said it has "all the finger-numbing action of the best arcade shoot-em-ups, combined with some of the most stunning animation ever seen in a video game" and that it was "a glossy air combat game that ranks higher than similar efforts that have preceded it". The review called it "one of the most beautiful and realistic shooting games ever produced" with "somewhat shallow" gameplay that is nevertheless "definitively worth the price of admission" especially in the "cockpit simulator" cabinet.

Sinclair User reviewed the arcade game, scoring it 8 out of 10. Ciarán Brennan of Your Sinclair said that, despite the higher price point, do not "let a little thing like a pound coin stand between you and action like this". Robin Hogg of The Games Machine called it the "hottest Sega release so far" with praise for the graphics and gameplay, but with some criticism towards the £1 UK price.

At the 1987 Gamest Awards in Japan, After Burner won the Best Graphics award, while being a runner-up for Game of the Year (2nd place), Best Ending (6th place), Best VGM (4th place), Best Sound Synthesis (8th place) and Most Popular Game (3rd place). After Burner also won a Special Award at the 1988 Gamest Awards. In the United States, After Burner won the award for "Most Innovative Game" at the Amusement & Music Operators Association's 1988 AMOA Games Awards.

=== After Burner II ===
Reviews (ports)

Review scores
Publication	Score
ACE	SMD: 695/1000; TG16: 666/1000
IGN	Mobile: 5/10
Joystick	SMD: 79% TG16: 72%
Mean Machines Sega	SCD: 22/100
Player One	92%
Retro Gamer	90%
Zero	90/100
Compute's Guide	SMD: 19/25
MegaTech	SMD: 90%

In Japan, After Burner II was tied with After Burner as the highest-grossing arcade game of 1988.

Mega placed the Mega Drive version at number 38 in their Top Mega Drive Games of All Time. MegaTech magazine praised the smooth and fast gameplay, as well as the sound.

== Ports ==
The game was ported to the Amiga, MS-DOS, Amstrad CPC, Atari ST, X68000, FM Towns, Commodore 64, Master System, PC Engine, Sega Saturn, MSX, ZX Spectrum. The C64 has two versions: a European version by U.S. Gold, and a US version by Activision and Weebee Games. A port for the Famicom was released in Japan by Sunsoft and for the NES in North America by Tengen (the latter version of which was not licensed by Nintendo). A port to the 32X was done by Rutubo Games, and was known as After Burner Complete in Japan and Europe. A port to the Game Boy Advance was included in the arcade compilation Sega Arcade Gallery.

After Burner for the Master System was a bestseller for Sega in the United States during 1988. Computer Gaming World reviewed After Burner on the Master System, citing aircraft depicted in "remarkable detail", "spectacular" scenery, and excellent explosions. The ZX Spectrum port was well-received, with Sinclair User calling it a "top-class coin-op conversion destined for the top of the charts" and giving it 90%, whilst Crash magazine gave it 86% overall. Zzap!64's reviewers were unimpressed with the Commodore 64 version, which was described as "incredibly disappointing" with "laughably bad" graphics and sound. It was given an overall rating of 17%. A later Computer Gaming World review for the PC was much more critical, giving the game one star out of five and stating that it was inferior to the arcade version.

Reviewing the 32X version, GamePro commented that the graphics, sound, and gameplay are all great, but that the only difference between it and the Genesis version of After Burner II are some minor graphical and audio enhancements, making it only worthwhile to gamers who have never played an After Burner game before.

After Burner II has been translated and ported to numerous home systems: PC Engine, X68000, Mega Drive/Genesis, Famicom, FM Towns Marty, Atari ST, Amiga, Amstrad CPC, Commodore 64, and Sega Saturn.

The game was rebuilt with stereoscopic 3D feature as one of 3D Classics for Nintendo 3DS.

== Legacy ==
Although the After Burner brand was long dormant, Sega created a number of aerial combat games centered on the F-14 Tomcat with many similar features, which are frequently regarded as part of the series. These include G-LOC: Air Battle and its sequel Strike Fighter (later rebranded After Burner III in its home release). Later games associated with the series include Sky Target (which retained similar gameplay and presentation to the original, but with the addition of 3D graphics) and Sega Strike Fighter (an arcade flight combat game which featured free-roaming movement, boasting similar music but with an F/A-18 Hornet as the main plane).

In 2006, Sega released a new sequel on Sega Lindbergh hardware, After Burner Climax, the first arcade game to bear the brand since After Burner II.

After Burner Climax was later ported to Xbox Live Arcade and PSN. It was followed by the spin-off After Burner: Black Falcon for the PSP in 2007. After Burner Climax was de-listed in December 2014, leaving the game no longer available for purchase, only to be brought back in March 2019 to digital mobile platforms for free, with ads, under the Sega Forever brand.

In Japan, After Burner II was released on the PlayStation 2 as part of the Sega Ages classic series.

M2 ported After Burner II in Sega's 3D Classics series to the Nintendo 3DS eShop in Japan on 2013 and worldwide in 2015. This version is faithful to the original arcade game with additions, including Touch Controls and screen layouts that resemble the Upright as well as the Commander and Deluxe cabinets. An unlockable new Special mode was also added, which used a time-slowing "Burst" system similar to After Burner Climax, and featured a different story and altered stages. This mode has no stage select or continues, and instead depends on frequent acquisition of extra lives over the course of the game in order to complete it.

=== In other games ===
An emulated version of After Burner is playable at the in-game arcade in Shenmue 2.

The plane from After Burner makes a cameo in Fighters Megamix, accessed with a cheat code.

The music from After Burner appears in a remix in Chapter 8, entitled "Route 666", of Bayonetta (developed by PlatinumGames and published by Sega). This remix is reused in Super Smash Bros. for Wii U and Super Smash Bros. Ultimate on the Bayonetta stage, Umbra Clock Tower.

An area based on After Burner, "Carrier Zone", appears as a tennis court in Sega Superstars Tennis and as a race track in Sonic & All-Stars Racing Transformed. The latter also features a playable racer, AGES, whose vehicle transforms into an After Burner-inspired F-14 Tomcat during flight segments.

A remix of After Burner appears in Hatsune Miku: Project DIVA on both the arcade & console versions, complete with Vocaloid vocals.
