= Columns II =

1990 video game

Columns II: The Voyage Through Time
- Developer: Sega
- Publisher: Sega
- Composers: Takayuki Nakamura; You Takada
- Platforms: Arcade, Sega Saturn, Nintendo Switch
- Release: Arcade: JP: July 21, 1990; Sega Saturn: JP: October 30, 1997; Nintendo Switch: JP: August 8, 2019; NA/PAL: October 17, 2019
- Genre: Puzzle
- Modes: Single-player, multiplayer
- Arcade system: Sega System C

Columns II: The Voyage Through Time (erroneously labeled as A Voyage Through Time on the Switch release) is a 1990 puzzle video game released by Sega, as the sequel to Columns. It was released in Japan for the Sega System C. A port was included in the compilation Sega Ages: Columns Arcade Collection released for the Sega Saturn in Japan in 1997. Columns III however, would be released in North America on the Sega Genesis. The game saw an international release through the Sega Ages line on Nintendo Switch.

== Gameplay ==
The gameplay is standard Columns fare, match at least three jewels to eliminate them. If the board fills all the way to the top, it results in a loss. The objects that must be destroyed are not always jewels. Since the players go "Through Time", the objects that can be destroyed varies from fossils to futuristic disks. Other than an interesting sprite swap, the "Through Time" idea does not actually affect the gameplay.

Columns II has two modes, Flash Columns, and Vs Columns (eventually renamed Stack Columns). In Flash Columns, the goal is to eliminate the flashing jewels, disks, or fossils that are in each stage. In order to reach the flashing objects, the player must dig their way through the objects that cover it. After all of the flashing objects are eliminated, the player advances to the next, usually faster level. Every three levels, there is a bonus stage in which the player can earn bonus points. While Columns for the Sega Genesis was the first appearance of Flash Columns, Columns 2 was its first appearance in the arcades.

Vs Columns is much more similar to the original Columns where the players build up combos and clear them rather than digging through jewels to get to a certain gem, but it has a competitive twist. In this mode, both players are given the same gems and have to build up combos against each other. The larger the combo, the higher opponent's board is raised until the other player's board is filled to the brim. This is the first appearance of Vs Columns; this mode has been put in almost all later versions of Columns and has become a fan favorite.

== Ports ==
The game was later ported to Nintendo Switch as part of the Switch Sega Ages line. It also marked the first time in nearly 30 years that the game was released in Western territories.

== Reception ==
In Japan, Game Machine listed Columns II on their November 1, 1990 issue as being the second most-successful table arcade unit of the month. It went on to be Japan's eighth highest-grossing arcade conversion kit of 1991.
