= Wing War =

1994 video game

- Japanese arcade flyer
- Developer: Sega
- Publisher: Sega
- Platform: Arcade
- Release: WW: June 1994; NA: September 1994
- Genre: Combat flight simulator
- Mode: Single-player
- Arcade system: Sega Model 1

Wing War (Note: ウイングウォー, Uingu Wō) is a 1994 combat flight simulator game developed for the Sega Model 1 arcade system by Sega. The object of the game is to fight head-to-head in airplanes and attempt to shoot other players out of the sky. Running on the same hardware as Sega's Virtua Fighter and Virtua Racing, the game features 3D polygon graphics.

It was available as a two-player sit-down unit as well as a rotating R360 motion simulator arcade cabinet, the second and last title to support the cabinet. A home conversion for the Sega 32X was in development, but later cancelled.

== Gameplay ==
Gameplay screenshot

Like Virtua Racing, the game has four view mode buttons: a cockpit view, rear view, top view and an automatic view. The player has a throttle to control the plane's speed (for Expert mode only), a yoke to control the plane's movement, and two triggers to fire machine guns and homing missiles. Wing War has two game modes: Dogfight and Expert. Dogfight is a shoot 'em up fighting style mode, where two aircraft are in battle across the sky while flying towards the finish line at the end of the stage with the most power left unharmed. Expert mode is where the simulation part comes into play. In this mode, the player has full control when flying their plane, but now the controls handle like a real aircraft.

== Reception ==
In Japan, Game Machine listed Wing War on their August 15, 1994 issue as being the most-successful upright/cockpit arcade game of the month. In North America, RePlay reported it was the fifth most-popular deluxe arcade game at the time.
