= Thunder Blade =

1987 video game

- Japanese arcade flyer
- Developer: Sega R&D1
- Publishers: Sega; Home computers; U.S. Gold
- Composer: Koichi Namiki
- Platform: Arcade: Master System, Amiga, Amstrad CPC, Atari ST, Commodore 64, ZX Spectrum, MS-DOS, MSX, X68000, PC Engine, Nintendo 3DS
- Release: December 18, 1987: Arcade; JP: December 18, 1987; EU: January 1988; NA: February 1988 Master System; JP: July 30, 1988; NA: October 1988; EU: November 1988 Amiga, Atari ST, C64; EU: 1988; NA: March 1989 CPC, ZX Spectrum; EU: 1988 MS-DOS; EU: 1989; NA: December 1989 PC Engine; JP: December 7, 1990 Nintendo 3DS; JP: August 20, 2014; NA/EU: May 14, 2015; AU: July 2, 2015
- Genres: Rail shooter, scrolling shooter
- Mode: Single-player
- Arcade system: Sega X Board

Thunder Blade (Note: Japanese: サンダーブレード, Hepburn: Sandāburēdo) is a 1987 rail shooter video game developed and published by Sega for arcades. Players control a helicopter to destroy enemy vehicles. The game was released as a stand-up arcade cabinet with force feedback, as the joystick vibrates. A helicopter-shaped sit-down model was released, replacing the force feedback with a cockpit seat that moves in tandem with the joystick. It is a motion simulator cabinet, like the previous Sega Super Scaler games Space Harrier (1985) and After Burner (1987). The game's plot and setting were inspired by the 1983 film Blue Thunder.

Versions were released for the Master System, Amiga, Amstrad CPC, Atari ST, Commodore 64, MS-DOS, MSX, PC Engine, X68000, and ZX Spectrum. The Nintendo 3DS remake was released as a 3D Classic in Japan on August 20, 2014, in North America and Europe on May 14, 2015, and in Australia on July 2 of the same year. The sequel, Super Thunder Blade, was released exclusively for the Sega Genesis.

== Plot ==
In the year 1992, anti-government guerrilla forces in the nation of Country A stage a revolt; supported by Country S. A new but still incomplete combat helicopter known as “Thunder Blade,” piloted by Country A’s commander of the 12th Air Reconnaissance Battalion Captain Lantz Goswerk, heads into enemy territory to tackle this threat.

== Gameplay ==
Arcade version

The player controls a helicopter gunship using its chain gun and missiles to destroy enemy tanks, helicopters, and other vehicles and structures, to save their home country. Each level is in either a top-down or third-person perspective view.

The player is given 2 "lives" as continues, used if they are killed in a level. Clearing a level allows the player to return, bypassing the levels before it.

The 3D classic release allows joystick emulation and gyroscopic controls.

== Development ==
The plot and setting were inspired by the 1983 film Blue Thunder, from which a digitized frame became the title screen.

== Reception ==
Reception

Review scores
Publication	Score						
Publication	Amiga	Arcade	Atari ST	C64	Master System	PC	ZX
Crash							91%
Computer and Video Games		Positive	66%		80%		82%
Sinclair User							87%
The Games Machine (UK)	85%		84%	65%		54% (CPC)	87%
Your Sinclair							9/10
Commodore User		9/10					

Award
Publication	Award
Golden Joystick Awards	Console Game of the Year (Master System)

In Japan, Game Machine listed Thunder Blade as the fourth most successful upright arcade unit of January 1988. It went on to become Japan's ninth highest-grossing dedicated arcade game of 1988.

The arcade game was well received by critics. Clare Edgeley of Computer and Video Games called it "a helicopter simulation with several innovative features". She said it was "a brilliant game" with "superb" graphics and gameplay. Your Sinclair stated that "Thunder Blade is probably the game which took most of your money in the arcades this summer, probably one of the most eagerly awaited coin-op conversions".

At the 1988–1989 Golden Joystick Awards, the Master System version won the award for Console Game of the Year. The ZX Spectrum version also received a Crash Smash award from Crash magazine.
