= Strike Fighter =

1991 video game

- Arcade flyer
- Developers: Sega AM2; CRI (FM-Towns, CD)
- Publisher: Sega
- Series: After Burner
- Platforms: Arcade, FM Towns, Sega CD
- Release: Arcade: JP: June 1991; FM Towns: JP: 1992; Sega CD: JP: December 18, 1992; EU: August 1993; NA: 1993
- Genre: Shoot 'em up
- Mode: Single-player

Strike Fighter (Note: Japanese: ストライクファイター, Hepburn: Sutoraiku Faitā) is a 1991 combat flight simulation video game developed and published by Sega for arcades. It is the sequel to G-LOC: Air Battle. It was ported to the FM Towns home computer and Sega CD by CRI as After Burner III. It was followed by a sequel named Sega Strike Fighter in 2000.

== Gameplay ==
The basic controls are the same as previous games in the series but this time the player has access to unlimited missiles.

== Reception ==
Mega Action gave a review score of 48% praising the arcade style graphics and sound, the game intro and the option to change the gameplay camera. They criticized the gameplay lacking plot, detail and playability.
