= Sega Arcade Gallery =

2003 video game

- Developer(s): Bits Studios
- Publisher(s): Sega: NA: THQ
- Composer(s): Anthony N. Putson
- Platform(s): Game Boy Advance
- Release: NA: May 22, 2003; EU: August 1, 2003
- Genre(s): Various
- Mode(s): Single-player

Sega Arcade Gallery is a compilation of four Sega arcade games ported to the Game Boy Advance. It was released in North America on May 22, 2003 and in Europe on August 1.

== Games included ==
- After Burner (1987)
- Out Run (1986)
- Space Harrier (1985)
- Super Hang-On (1987)
