= Transformers: Human Alliance =

2013 video game

- Developer: Sega of China
- Publisher: Sega
- Series: Transformers
- Platform: Arcade
- Release: 2013

Transformers: Human Alliance is a rail shooter arcade game developed by Sega. Set within the Transformers film franchise, it is the first arcade video game in the Transformers franchise. It was showcased in November 2013 at the IAAPA Attractions Show in Orlando; a local Dave & Buster's location publicly launched the game at this time. The name is based on the toyline by Hasbro and Takara Tomy, which were mostly the Transformers characters which came with the humans from the films, and lasted from 2009–2011.

In 2015, Sega introduced a motion simulator attraction based on the game at Joypolis—Transformers: Human Alliance Special. This version of the game utilizes an upgraded, two-passenger version of Sega's previous R360 motion simulator system.

A sequel, titled Transformers: Shadows Rising, was released in 2018.

== Synopsis ==
=== Stage 1: East America ===
Outside of the city, human civilian Jake is being escorted by Bumblebee and NEST Agent Vanessa, having been tasked to deliver a device to someone. However, his call to Sam Witwicky is cut off, and numerous Decepticons begin chasing them over the highway. Bumblebee arms the humans to fight back, but even with help from NEST reinforcements and Autobot leader Optimus Prime, the three are cornered by more Decepticons led by Starscream.

The team attempts to flee but Starscream throws a tanker truck at them. Outside a nearby factory, Starscream once again corners them and attacks, with the humans joining Bumblebee in fighting back. As they try to save their Autobot friend from Starscream's grasp, the Decepticon grabs them briefly before they try to blast their way free, this costs Jake the device as he drops it resulting in it being stolen by Laserbeak. They continue to fight off Starscream's attacks until Optimus Prime shows up, plowing into the scheming Decepticon and ending the fight. However, despite being threatened by Optimus, Starscream wins the battle having retrieved the device with the help from Laserbeak; the two Decepticons depart. Following the level, the player can choose either to go help Sideswipe in England or Optimus Prime in the Sahara Desert.

=== Stage 2A: England Central City ===
NEST soldiers are ambushed by Decepticon drones under Soundwave's command while trying to investigate the epicenter of an earthquake. Vanessa and Jake, accompanied by Sideswipe, respond to the team's call for assistance, taking on numerous Decepticon drones. However the enemy proves too much to handle and Sideswipe is forced to flee into a tunnel, with Soundwave himself giving chase. In the ensuing chase, Sideswipe leaps through buildings taking out numerous drones, though Jake himself throws up due to the movement. Soundwave catches up to them as they reach a nearby bridge, forcing the Autobot to take on both him and Laserbeak. With the help from Jake and Vanessa, Sideswipe is victorious and the group finish crossing the bridge.

Moving at high-speed through the city, they take out more drones from both the land and the sky. NEST headquarters radios in to confirm the presence of another Decepticon, at which point a tank rolls into view and attacks them by firing a barrage of missiles. Sideswipe and the humans manage to survive the assault, but the tank transforms into Brawler and fires another round of missiles at them. The team are able to take out the turrets one at a time, but Brawler simply tosses Sideswipe aside now focusing his fury on Vanessa and Jake. The Decepticon is later brought down by the humans' attack and Optimus Prime later appears to demand him if the Decepticons are behind the earthquake, only to succumb to his injuries before Optimus can get any information from him.

=== Stage 2B: Sahara Desert ===
Vanessa and Jake accompany Optimus Prime to Africa following the source of earthquakes. When they arrive, the town appears to be abandoned but it is revealed that they have been lured into an ambush. Despite the Autobots best efforts, the humans have to fend off everything from mechanical buzzards to hordes of insects before Optimus helps them make their getaway over the city's rooftops.

But no sooner that they reach the outskirts of the city the ground rips up before them, and they are confronted by Shockwave.

Optimus transforms and flees, taking the humans into the desert while pursued by Shockwave and an army of drones. Before they can be overwhelmed, Sideswipe appears to add his support, but Shockwave eventually gets ahead of the Prime, forcing him into a one-on-one conflict. With the humans' help Optimus prevails, but Shockwave escapes before he can be finished off and they are once again forced to flee from the drones and the colossal and heavily armed Scorponok King. A hectic chase results in the beastly Decepticon being literally disarmed and brought down, Optimus impaling it with its own tail to finish it off. Sideswipe catches up to the group just as they recover the Device, which is revealed to be the cause of the global quakes, and Optimus realizes that Megatron has led them on a wild goose chase.

=== Stage 3: USA West Coast ===
The Decepticons have launched a massive assault on a West Coast city. As a squadron of NEST fighter jets accompany Optimus, Bumblebee and their human companions, Vanessa seems shocked at the carnage, but Jake seems unusually confident... Right up until parts start falling off their stolen Decepticon fighter. Optimus splits from the group as Bumblebee flies the humans through the city, taking out several other fighters sent to intercept them. Their good fortune doesn't last however, when their squadron is attacked by Skywarp, forcing them deeper into the city. Optimus eventually rejoins them and, despite Skywarp's impressive skills in teleportation, he is no match for the Prime and the humans' coordinated attacks and is easily killed.

Optimus covers the rear as Bumblebee takes point into the depths of the city. They soon catch up with the Decepticon ship, and are confronted by a goading Megatron. Prime demands answers for all that has gone on, but Megatron seems more interested in the humans and attacks Bumblebee's ship. Optimus and Megatron start to duke it out as the warship launches missile after missile at Bumblebee's fighter, causing Jake more distress with his weak stomach. Jake spots an entrance into the warship and the team blasts their way inside for cover. After clearing out a wave of drones, Vanessa takes note of the energon nodes and they promptly go to work destroying them to cripple the ship. Before they can take out the last one, Starscream makes his reappearance, almost taking the heads off the human’s before being blasted back into the node. The ship explodes, but Jake's celebration is cut short by an abrupt transmission from Optimus, asking them to converge on his and Megatron's position.

=== Stage 4: Canadian Frontier ===
Bumblebee and his human companions crash land somewhere in Canada, having followed Optimus' signal. Instead of their leader, they find Megatron who gloats that Optimus is already dead. He then directs their attention to the nearby energon tower, and boasts that its power will win him not only Earth, but Cybertron as well... But not before he finally finishes off Jake and Vanessa.

Megatron gives chase both in the air and on the ground, and with the energon tower interfering with Bumblebee's capabilities, it is up to the humans to fend off the Decepticon leader as best they can. Things are made even more complicated when Megatron summons the other drones to attack, eventually corralling them. Brought to a halt, Megatron simply tosses Bumblebee aside and prepares to terminate the humans. Suddenly he is blasted away, and Megatron is shocked to see it is a very much alive Optimus, who vows to end Megatron's plan. The two clash once again, Jake and Vanessa now able to add their firepower to the mix and together, the three of them bring Megatron to his knees and defeat him.

Before they can finish off Megatron, another earthquake shakes the whole area. Vanessa notes that the energon tower has gone out of control, with Bumblebee adding that its power will destroy the entire Earth. NEST back up arrives in the form of Sideswipe and a squadron of troopers, and Optimus orders everyone to destroy the tower before it is too late. The threat is finally over, but Jake quickly notices that Megatron has made his escape. Optimus notes in a message that the battle with the Decepticons will continue, and that as long as they are on Earth, no harm will come to the human race.
