= Puzzle & Action: Tant-R =

1993 video game

- Developer: Sega
- Publisher: Sega
- Platforms: Arcade, Mega Drive, Game Gear, Saturn, PlayStation 2
- Release: Arcade: JP/KR: 1993; Mega Drive: JP: 1 April 1994; Game Gear: JP: 22 April 1994; Saturn: JP: 24 May 1996; PlayStation 2 (Sega Ages 2500): JP: 15 January 2004
- Genre: Puzzle
- Modes: Single-player, Multiplayer
- Arcade system: Sega System C

Puzzle & Action: Tant-R (Note: (also known as just Tant-R (Note: タントアール, Tanto Āru))), is a puzzle video game developed and published by Sega in 1993 for the Sega System C in Japan. The first instalment in the Puzzle & Action trilogy, it is a spin-off of Bonanza Bros.. The characters from Bonanza Bros., Robo and Mobo, are featured as protagonists, functioning as detectives. A prison escapee is chased, and his henchmen interfere. A series of timed mini-games must be completed to defeat the henchmen. The game features references to western culture.

The game was ported to the Sega Mega Drive and Game Gear in 1994, to the Saturn as part of the Sega Ages Shukudai ga Tant R (Note: Shukudai ga Tant R (宿題がタントアール, Shukudai ga Tanto Āru)) compilation in 1996, and released on the Wii Virtual Console in 2007. An updated version was released for the PlayStation 2 as part of the Sega Ages 2500 Vol. 6 compilation in Japan in 2004 (re-released on the PlayStation Store in 2013), and the Sega Classics Collection, the only English localisation, in 2005. In 2002, a service allowing games to be downloaded to a mobile phone was launched. Reception was mixed: although the graphics and gameplay were praised, some reviewers criticised the mini-games themselves. Puzzle & Action: Tant-R was followed by two sequels: Puzzle & Action: Ichidant-R, featuring a medieval theme, in 1994, and Puzzle & Action: Treasure Hunt, featuring a treasure-hunting theme, in 1995.

== Plot ==
In arcade mode, a dangerous criminal known as 'Boss' has escaped from prison. The Boss has enlisted the help of his henchmen. The detectives (dressed as Sherlock Holmes and Dr. Watson) must chase the Boss and tackle the henchmen. When caught, the Boss and henchmen are arrested. The detectives are then interviewed and are seen on stage in a theatre. In arcade mode, the Boss is chased over locations including a city (featuring landmarks of London and Paris), a desert, a casino, and a construction site. In multiplayer, he is chased along a motorway, and the detectives are congratulated outside the Palace of Westminster afterwards.

== Gameplay ==
A mini-game. Using the hints at the bottom, the correct item must be found on a grid of shapes of different sizes and colours.

The game consists of four stages. To complete a stage, the required number of games must be completed. A selection of four games is presented; the selection shifts quickly (like a roulette wheel) and a button is pressed to play the selected game (in multiplayer, a random game is displayed). There are twenty games, categorised into five types: puzzle, counting, concentration, barrage, and picture searching (for example, one game requires a given pattern of fruit machine symbols to be located on a grid). Other objectives include selecting the correct option (or options) among incorrect ones, memorising and following a sequence, and pressing the button at the correct moment or at a quick enough pace. Certain games' names are puns on pop culture names or terms. Such references include Rock n Roll, Billy Joel, Stanley Kubrick, and Out Run's music track Magical Sound Shower. Each game has a time limit, and if time runs out or a mistake is made, a life is lost. The player begins with three lives. Occasionally, a game will become a "Lucky!" icon. Selecting this grants a piece of a heart and begins a random game. Collecting all three pieces (one in the PlayStation 2 version) grants an extra life.

The mini-games increase in difficulty as the game progresses. At the end of the first three stages, the Boss escapes on a hot air balloon, and the detectives give chase in aeroplanes. In this bonus round, balloons must be popped, and missiles must be avoided (hitting one temporarily paralyses the player). If all the balloons are popped, an extra life is given. At the end of the fourth stage, the criminal must be apprehended in a final challenge. In the Mega Drive version, this involves locating his hideout on a map. In the Game Gear version, it is a car chase, and other cars must be manoeuvred around.

The Mega Drive version includes a 'free' mode, in which the mini-games can be practised, and a Competition mode. Up to four players are supported using the Multiplayer adaptor. Four of the games are only playable in these modes, such as the one in which the correct biscuits (cookies) must be collected. The Game Gear version features a Battle mode, in which two players compete by playing games against each other using the Gear-to-Gear cable to link two units, but features only twelve games, two of which are exclusive to this version. The PlayStation 2 version adds the games from the sequel, Ichidant-R, and includes two new ones, for a total of thirty-eight.

== Development and release ==
Puzzle & Action: Tant-R was released on the Mega Drive on 1 April 1994, the Game Gear on 22 April 1994, and the Saturn as part of the Shukudai ga Tant R compilation on 24 May 1996. The title comes from Japanese tanto aru (たんとある; "there are many") In March 2007, Puzzle & Action: Tant-R was released on the Virtual Console in Japan. The Sega Ages 2500 compilation, Ichini no Tant-R to Bonanza Brothers (Note: Ichini no Tant-R to Bonanza Brothers (イチニのタントアールとボナンザブラザーズ, Ichini no Tanto Āru to Bonanza Burazāzu)) was released on 15 January 2014 (although originally scheduled for release in December 2003), and re-released on the PlayStation Store for the PlayStation 3 in Japan on 17 July 2013.

=== Mobile download service ===
In 2002, WOW Entertainment developed and released a Java app in Japan for J-Phone mobile phones, enabling the download of games from the series. The service began on 18 September 2002, and games could be purchased on a pay-as-you-go or monthly basis.

== Reception ==
Reception

Review scores
Publication	Score
Famitsu	25/40 (Game Gear)
Beep! Mega Drive	7/10 (Game Gear)

Puzzle & Action: Tant-R received mixed reviews. Reviewing the Sega Classics Collection version, Eurogamer described the game as "amusingly weird". Sci-fi Online said it is the best game in the Sega Classics Collection, commended the addictiveness of multiplayer, and commented that the compilation is "almost worth buying for Tant R alone". PSX Extreme criticised the game's repetitiveness. VideoGamer.com described the game as "a collection of pretty poor mini-games". The Japanese Sega Saturn Magazine looked at the game in the Shukudai ga Tant R compilation, and in another article, described Puzzle & Action: Tant-R as a "Puzzle Game Boom". Beep! Mega Drive reviewed the Game Gear version: the four reviewers gave high marks. IGN's Anoop Gantayat said the original Tant-R has "wacky 2D artwork", and that the Ichini no Tant-R to Bonanza Bros re-release mimics it. He also said the game is "a good amount of fun".

GamesTM listed Tant-R as a game they would like to see localised and released on modern western systems. In Japan, Game Machine listed Puzzle & Action: Tant-R on their 15 August 1993 issue as being the second most-successful table arcade unit of the month.
