= Lock-On (video game) =

1986 video game

- Title screen
- Developer: Tatsumi
- Publishers: Tatsumi (Japan); Data East (US)
- Platforms: Arcade, IBM PC, Atari ST
- Release: October 7, 1986
- Genre: Combat flight simulator
- Mode: Single-player

Lock-On is a 1986 first-person combat flight simulator video game with a futuristic theme. It was developed by Tatsumi and licensed to Data East for US distribution. Its graphics feature scaling sprites and a full-screen rotation effect. The game consists of 20 levels. Gameplay is similar to After Burner but presented in a first person perspective from inside the cockpit. The plane follows a predefined path, but the player can steer it slightly to evade incoming missiles. The player can fire guns and homing missiles, the latter of which requires the eponymous lock-on first.

== Reception ==
In Japan, Game Machine listed Lock-On on their June 15, 1987 issue as being the eleventh most-successful upright arcade unit of the month.
