= Super Hang-On =

1987 video game

- North American arcade flyer
- Developer: Sega R&D1
- Publisher: Sega
- Designer: Yu Suzuki
- Composers: Katsuhiro Hayashi; Koichi Namiki
- Series: Hang-On
- Platform: Arcade: ZX Spectrum, Amstrad CPC, Commodore 64, Atari ST, Amiga, Macintosh, Mega Drive/Genesis, X68000, IBM PC, Nintendo 3DS
- Release: April 1987: Arcade; JP: April 1987; NA: June 1987 ZX Spectrum; UK: November 1987 C64, CPC; EU: 1987 Atari ST; EU: 1988; NA: November 1989 Amiga; EU: January 1989; NA: November 1989 Macintosh; NA: March 1989 Mega Drive/Genesis; JP: October 6, 1989; NA: November 1989; EU: November 1990 X68000; JP: December 25, 1989 IBM PC; NA: 1989 Nintendo 3DS; JP: March 27, 2013; NA/EU: November 28, 2013
- Genre: Racing
- Mode: Single-player
- Arcade system: Sega Super Scaler

Super Hang-On (Note: Japanese: スーパーハング・オン, Hepburn: Sūpā Hangu On) is a 1987 racing video game developed and published by Sega for arcades. It is the sequel to 1985's Hang-On, and uses a simulated motorcycle arcade cabinet, like the original game. An updated version was released for arcades as Limited Edition Hang-On in 1991.

== Gameplay ==
Arcade screenshot

The arcade mode in Super Hang-On is similar to the original Hang-On, but there is a choice of four tracks to race on which are based on continents, each containing a different number of stages. Also, if the player reaches the normal maximum speed of 280 km/h (174.2 mph), a turbo mode is enabled. Using this mode allows the player to reach an even higher top speed of 324 km/h (201.4 mph). Each stage is roughly half the length of a stage in the original Hang-On. Africa is the easiest and shortest out of the four courses (six stages). Asia is the second easiest and is similar in length to the course from the original Hang-On at ten stages long. The Americas is the second toughest course, containing 14 stages, and Europe is the hardest course, being 18 stages long. When the player starts a race, they can choose from four songs to play during gameplay, a feature borrowed from Out Run.

The Mega Drive/Genesis version of the game included a port of the full arcade game, and an additional original mode, which allowed players to recruit sponsors and earn money to buy enhanced components for their bike. Progress in this section of the game is saved via an alphanumeric password consisting of two 14-character segments (ex. "2FF2F433F32514 FFMJJGGK6AONNO"). The cover for this version has a bike and rider in the same colors as Shinichi Ito, who competed in the All-Japan 500 cc Championship on a Rothmans Honda NSR500.

== Ports ==
Versions of the game were released for the ZX Spectrum, Amstrad CPC and Commodore 64 in 1987 with further home conversions following for the Mega Drive/Genesis, Amiga, Atari ST, Macintosh, X68000, and IBM PC in 1989 and 1990. The game also appeared on several Mega Drive/Genesis compilations, such as Mega Games I (bundled with the console as Mega Drive Magnum Set) and Sega 6-Pak. It was included in Sega Arcade Gallery for Game Boy Advance.

The arcade version was released on the Wii's Virtual Console service in Japan on September 14, 2010, and later in North America and Europe on May 3, 2012. Like Shinobi and its omission of any references to Marilyn Monroe, the Virtual Console version of Super Hang-On was slightly altered to avoid any copyright troubles. This includes the replacing of several in-game billboards which used to feature real brand names such as Cibie with similar billboards which mention other Sega games such as OutRun and After Burner. This version would be released on Xbox Live Arcade in 2012 as part of Sega Vintage Collection: Alex Kidd & Co.

Another version of the game was released for the Nintendo 3DS via the Nintendo eShop in Japan on March 27, 2013. The game feature stereoscopic 3D and tilt controls which emulate the arcade version. This version was released for North America and Europe on November 28, 2013.

Super Hang-On is playable at the in-game arcades in Yakuza 0, Yakuza 6, and Fist of the North Star: Lost Paradise.

== Reception ==
Reception

Review scores
Publication	Score
ACE	910/1000 (Amiga); 752/1000 (ZX Spectrum); 672/1000 (Amstrad CPC)
Crash	85% (ZX Spectrum)
Computer and Video Games	8/10 (Atari ST)
Sinclair User	10/10 (ZX Spectrum)
Your Sinclair	Positive (Arcade); 8/10 (ZX Spectrum)
Mega	90% (Mega Drive)
MegaTech	89% (Mega Drive)

Award
Publication	Award
Sinclair User	SU Classic

In Japan, Game Machine listed Super Hang-On as the most successful upright arcade unit of May 1987. The ride-on cabinet went on to become Japan's second highest-grossing upright/cockpit arcade game of 1987, below Sega's own Out Run. It was later Japan's seventh highest-grossing arcade game of 1988.

Peter Shaw of Your Sinclair reviewed the arcade game, calling it "brilliant, fast and the most accurate simulation of riding a motorbike" he had played. Mega Action reviewed the Mega Drive version and called it one of the best driving games for the system, giving it a score of 89%.

The ZX Spectrum version scored 10/10 in Sinclair User and received the "SU Classic" accolade. It was rated number 27 in the Your Sinclair Official Top 100 Games of All Time list.

== See also ==
- Hang-On GP
- Hang-On
