= G-LOC: Air Battle =

1990 video game

- Japanese arcade flyer
- Developer: Sega R&D8 (Note: Master System version developed by Sanritsu; Mega Drive/Genesis version developed by Probe Software.)
- Publisher: Sega
- Director: Yu Suzuki
- Programmer: Yu Suzuki
- Artist: Toshihiro Nagoshi
- Composers: Hiroshi Kawaguchi; Yasuhiro Takagi
- Series: After Burner
- Platform: Arcade: Game Gear, ZX Spectrum, Master System, Commodore 64, Amiga, Amstrad CPC, Atari ST, Mega Drive/Genesis, Nintendo Switch
- Release: February 23, 1990: Arcade; JP: February 23, 1990; NA: March 1990; EU: June 1990 Game Gear; JP: December 15, 1990; NA: April 1991; EU: June 1991 ZX Spectrum; UK: November 1991 Master System; PAL: January 1992 C64; UK: June 1992 Mega Drive/Genesis; JP: February 26, 1993; NA/PAL: February 1993 Switch; JP: March 26, 2020; NA/EU: April 30, 2020
- Genre: Combat flight simulator
- Mode: Single-player
- Arcade system: Sega Y Board

G-LOC: Air Battle (Note: Japanese: ジーロック エア バトル, Hepburn: Jī-Rokku Ea Batoru) is a 1990 combat flight simulator video game developed and published by Sega for arcades. It is a spin-off of the company's After Burner series. The title refers to "G-force induced Loss Of Consciousness". The game is known for its use of the R360 motion simulator arcade cabinet. The arcade game was a commercial and critical success upon release, and was followed by ports for Sega's Game Gear, Master System, and Mega Drive/Genesis consoles, as well as for various home computers.

== Gameplay ==
Arcade screenshot

The game puts the player in a fighter plane, dog fighting other planes. Once the player takes too many hits or the game-timer runs out the game is over. The player earns more time and advances stages by achieving goals that are set in each stage. The player initially starts with limited armament which is replenished by completing missions. Players choose what targets to destroy, like ships, jet fighters, or tanks. Eventually, players will attack bosses such as War Balloon, the Bomber, and the final adversary, an enemy ace who uses the same plane as the player, except with enhanced durability and strength.

The player controls an experimental aircraft (referred to as A8M5, but upgraded over time, finally becoming the A8M6) in a mission to eliminate enemy planes. During the game, the player is attacked from the front and back. The game is mostly played from a first-person perspective, but once locked onto by an enemy missile, the perspective changes to third-person behind the player's plane to allow the player to perform evasive maneuvers. The plane is controlled by a joystick and has two weapons: a cannon and missiles. The player can either try to shoot down enemy planes or target them by moving the crosshair over them and launching missiles at targeted planes to destroy them.

== Release ==
The game was released in three arcade cabinet versions: a standard stand-up version, a sit-down version and a deluxe sit-down version: the R-360 cabinet. The R-360 gives the game into a more dynamic feel as the cabinet responds to the pilot's actions, improving on the limited path of plane movement in the standup and sit-down versions. The cabinet is mounted on a gyroscope that can rotate along two axes, attached to a base which is stationary.

The game was ported to the Mega Drive/Genesis, Master System, and Game Gear. The home computer versions (Commodore 64, Amstrad CPC, ZX Spectrum, Atari ST, and Amiga) were named G-LOC R360.

Some ports include certain features not present in the arcade version. The Mega Drive version alternates between first and third-person perspectives at times, the Master System one features bosses, and the Game Gear one employs points that can be used to upgrade the jet.

The original arcade version was ported to home consoles for the first time in 2020 for the Nintendo Switch under the Sega Ages series. This version was released on March 26 in Japan and later on April 30 in North America and Europe and features new control options and new ways to play through stages.

== Reception ==
Reception
Review scores
| Publication | Scores | | |
| Publication | Arcade | Mega Drive | Master System |
|---|---|---|---|
| Beep! Mega Drive | | 4.5/10 | |
| Computer and Video Games | 86% | | 80% |
| Console XS | | | 83% |
| CU Amiga | 91% | | |
| Joypad | | 73% | |
| Mega | | 22% | |
| RePlay | Positive | | |
| Sinclair User | 95% 99% (R360) | | |

In Japan, Game Machine listed G-LOC: Air Battle as the most successful upright arcade game of May 1990. The deluxe cabinet version went on to become Japan's ninth highest-grossing dedicated arcade game of 1990. It was later Japan's fifth highest-grossing dedicated arcade game of 1991.

In North America, it was considered the hit of the show at Chicago's American Coin Machine Exposition (ACME) in March 1990, and became a commercial hit upon release. It was the top-grossing new video game on the RePlay arcade charts in June 1990. It was then the second highest-grossing dedicated arcade game in September 1990, below Konami's Teenage Mutant Ninja Turtles.

The arcade game received positive reviews from critics upon release. In a retrospective review, Brett Weiss of Allgame gave the arcade version a score of 3.5 out of 5 stars. He compared the game to After Burner, saying that G-Loc has superior graphics and slightly more versatile gameplay.

== Legacy ==
G-LOC received a Japan-only sequel in 1991, Strike Fighter (not to be confused with Sega Strike Fighter, released in 2000). It was ported to the FM Towns computer and the Sega CD console as After Burner III.
