= After Burner: Climax =

2006 video game

After Burner Climax
- 1st alternate arcade flyer
- Developer: Sega AM2
- Publisher: Sega
- Director: Masahide Kawakami
- Producer: Noriyuki Shimoda
- Programmer: Masayuki Sumi
- Artist: Seiji Aoki
- Composers: Keisuke Tsukahara; Fumio Ito; Masanori Takeuchi
- Platforms: Arcade, Xbox 360, PlayStation 3, iOS, Android
- Release: October 19, 2006: Arcade; JP: October 19, 2006; NA: November 28, 2006; Xbox 360; WW: April 21, 2010; PlayStation 3; JP: April 21, 2010; NA/EU: April 22, 2010; iOS; WW: February 7, 2013; Android; WW: March 30, 2013
- Genre: Combat flight simulation
- Mode: Single-player
- Arcade system: Sega Lindbergh

After Burner: Climax (Note: Japanese: アフターバーナー クライマックス, Hepburn: Afutâ Bânâ Kuraimakkusu) is a combat flight video game developed and published by Sega. The game is a part of the After Burner series, and was first released in arcades in 2006 and was later released digitally to Xbox 360 via Xbox Live Arcade and PlayStation 3 via PlayStation Network in April 2010.

Like previous incarnations of After Burner, the "Deluxe" After Burner: Climax cabinet has a servo-equipped chair; a new function is a button that locks the chair into a static upright position. Two other cabinet versions include a "Commander" version, which only tilts side to side, and the "Standard" version, which doesn't move at all. The "Deluxe" version cabinet has a widescreen LCD monitor, while the "Standard" and "Commander" models have a 29" CRT.

The digital version was delisted from both Xbox Live and PlayStation Store in December 2014, and was removed from the mobile storefronts in May 2015. The mobile version was re-released via the Sega Forever service in April 2019 but is no longer available.

== Gameplay ==
After Burner Climax introduces two new flyable aircraft to the series: the F/A-18E Super Hornet and F-15E Strike Eagle. The iconic F-14 Tomcat from previous games has been replaced with the F-14D Super Tomcat. The player selects the aircraft at the start screen.

While choosing their plane, the player can use the throttle to choose between four different paintjobs for each of the three planes. These paint jobs consist of a "Standard" scheme, "Camouflage" scheme, "Special" scheme, and "Low Visibility" scheme. After choosing their plane, the player can also choose to listen to After Burner: Climax's music or the original soundtrack from After Burner II by holding the throttle back and hitting the missile button.

== Reception ==
The Australian video game talk show Good Game's two reviewers gave the game a 6/10 and 8/10.
