= Puzzle & Action: Treasure Hunt =

1995 video game

- Sega Saturn cover
- Developer: CRI
- Publishers: Arcade; Sega (JP, NA); Deniam (KR); Saturn; CRI
- Platforms: Arcade, Saturn
- Release: Arcade: JP: October 1995; KR: 25 January 1997; NA: 1 September 1997; Saturn: JP: 5 April 1996
- Genre: Puzzle
- Modes: Single-player, Multiplayer
- Arcade system: Sega Titan Video

Puzzle & Action: Treasure Hunt (Note: known in Japan as Puzzle & Action: Nidoarukoto wa Sand-R (2度あることはサンドア〜ル), and as Puzzle & Action: Sand-R (サンドアール, Sando Āru)), is a puzzle video game released for the Sega Titan Video in 1995, and ported to the Japanese Sega Saturn by CRI in 1996. The Saturn version was re-released for the Satakore range in 1998. Puzzle & Action: Treasure Hunt is the third and final instalment in the Puzzle & Action series, after Puzzle & Action: Tant-R and Puzzle & Action: Ichidant-R. Like the previous games, players play a series of timed mini games to overcome enemies. Two players are supported.

== Gameplay ==
Gameplay is similar to the previous games, although the games are in 3D. There are four rounds of a number of timed mini games, and two players are supported. Twenty-two categorised mini games are featured, and like the previous instalments, there is a 'Free Play' mode where they can be practised. The Saturn version features a RPG-style 'Original mode', which features a shop where items such as torches and brooms can be purchased.

== Reception ==
Reception

Review score
Publication	Score
Sega Saturn Magazine (Japan)	7.33/10 (Saturn)

The three reviewers at the Japanese Sega Saturn Magazine gave the game a good score.
