= Columns III =

1993 video game

- North American Genesis box art
- Developers: Sega; Minato Giken
- Publishers: Arcade; Sega; Genesis/Mega Drive: JP: Sega; NA: Vic Tokai
- Composer: Morihiko Akiyama
- Series: Columns
- Platforms: Arcade, Genesis/Mega Drive
- Release: Arcade; 1993; Genesis/Mega Drive: JP: October 15, 1993; NA: March 1994
- Genre: Puzzle
- Modes: Single-player, multiplayer
- Arcade system: Sega Mega Play

Columns III: Revenge of Columns (コラムスIII： 対決！コラムスワールド; Columns III: Taiketsu! Columns World) is a puzzle arcade game published by Sega in Japan in 1993 and by Vic Tokai in North America in 1994 as a sequel to Columns II: The Voyage Through Time.

== Gameplay ==
Columns III is a competitive two player game. It includes a single-player mode with a series of AI opponents.

The area of play is enclosed within one of two tall, rectangular playing areas. Columns of three different symbols (such as differently-colored jewels) appear, one at a time, at the top of the well and fall to the bottom, landing either on the floor or on top of previously fallen "columns". While a column is falling, the player can move it left and right, and can also cycle the positions of the symbols within it. After a column lands, if three or more of the same symbols are connected in a horizontal, vertical, or diagonal line, those symbols disappear. The pile of columns then settles under gravity. If this resettlement causes three or more other symbols to align, they too disappear and the cycle repeats. The columns fall at a faster rate as play progresses. A player wins when their opponent's well fills up with jewels, which ends the match.

There are several ways a player can gain an advantage. Once a player gets at least 10 points, they can press the C button to spend them to reduce the opponent's playable space by one row, as well as reclaim a row of their own previously reduced space. Occasionally, a special column with a multicolor Magic Jewel appears. Depending on its configuration, it can shrink the opponent's play area, unshrink the player's board, or destroy all the jewels with the same color as the one it lands on.

There are also single-use items that are obtained in the single player mode, such as Barrier, Heavy Weight, Magic Gem, and Hourglass. These can be accessed in the pause menu by pressing the Start button. Hourglasses serve as continues, allowing for a rematch if the opponent wins twice.

The single player story mode has 3 difficulty options: easy, medium, and hard. The difficulty mode also affects how many levels can be accessed, with easy and medium both ending the game early. The story mode goes through different rooms of a pyramid with progressively more difficult opponents, such as bats and mummies.

== Ports ==
In 2002, Columns III was one of the first Sega titles launched under Sega's short-lived agreement with the RealOne Arcade download service. The Mega Drive version was released on the Wii's Virtual Console download service in Japan on December 11, 2007, in North America on February 4, 2008, and, for the first time in PAL territories, in Europe and Australia on May 2 of the same year. It was also most recently ported as part of Sega Genesis Classics.

== Reception ==
Reception

Aggregate score
Aggregator	Score
GameRankings	51.50%(5 reviews)

Electronic Gaming Monthly gave positive reviews and called it another highly engaging game, with a theme similar to games like Tetris and Pac Attack. Other reviewers, such as IGN and Eurogamer, gave low scores.
