= Space Harrier II =

1988 video game

- North American Genesis box art
- Developer: Sega
- Publishers: WW: Sega Home computers; EU: Grandslam Entertainment
- Designer: Yu Suzuki
- Composers: Tokuhiko Uwabo; Home computers Matt Furniss
- Series: Space Harrier
- Platforms: Mega Drive/Genesis, Amiga, Amstrad CPC, Atari ST, Commodore 64, MSX, ZX Spectrum, iOS
- Release: October 29, 1988: Mega Drive/Genesis; JP: October 29, 1988; NA: August 1989; EU: September 1990 Amiga, Atari ST, C64, CPC, MSX, ZX Spectrum; EU: 1990 iOS; WW: July 22, 2010
- Genre: Rail shooter
- Mode: Single-player

Space Harrier II (スペースハリアーII, Supēsu Hariā Tsū) is a 1988 rail shooter video game developed and published by Sega. The sequel to 1985's Space Harrier, it was one of the original launch titles released for the Mega Drive in Japan and one of the six Sega Genesis launch titles in the United States the following year. It was later released on the Wii's Virtual Console in December 2006, and also on the Nintendo Classics service in April 2022. Like Altered Beast, another launch title for the Mega Drive, Space Harrier II features digitized voice recordings during gameplay, and is also an example of some of the Mega Drive's early sound, with music composed by Tokuhiko Uwabo (credited as "Bo"). A graphically enhanced version included with the Sega Genesis Mini 2 was released in October 2022.

== Plot ==
Harrier once again receives a call for help, this time from the 214th sector, light-years from his cruiser. Harrier travels there quickly with his "cosmic gate", and finds that Fantasy Land is once again being overrun by hostile forces. He resolves to once again save a world by fighting off the entire force himself.

== Gameplay ==
Like the original, the game involves a superhuman hero who runs and flies towards a forever distant background on a checkerboard-styled ground. The player can hit any of the controller's buttons to cause the Space Harrier character to fire his large laser cannon (four shots at a time). There is also an option to turn on auto-fire in the game menu. As the playing field moves forward, enemies come from behind and from the far distance to attack the character, by either firing a projectile or trying to crash into him. The player must also dodge large objects in his path, some of which can be destroyed, such as trees, and others that cannot be, such as ionic columns and pylons. One hit from an enemy or a crash into these large objects will cause the player to lose a life; extra lives are awarded every certain number of points. Smaller objects, such as foliage, will only cause Harrier to trip, but this leaves him vulnerable to attack for two seconds. If the player loses all lives, the game will be over.

There are a total of 13 stages, each with its own end boss. A stage usually consists of different landscapes (small objects vs. large objects), and can also move at different speeds (slow vs. fast). Some stages, such as Stuna Area, have a mid-level boss that can be easily defeated. Although the player can select any stage to start the game at, all twelve levels must be completed before moving on to the Final Chapter stage. There, the player must defeat all the main bosses over again, and then fight the Dark Harrier in order to complete the game.

Enemies move onto the screen in uniform clusters. A signal tone is played to alert the player that there is a non-stationary enemy now in the playing field. In many cases, the enemies move in a straight line along a predetermined, pseudo-three-dimensional path. Waves of enemies also often come in pairs: one group will come from the left in the distance or foreground, followed by the same type and same number of enemies coming in from the right. Due to the inability of the Mega Drive to scale sprites, enemy, landscape, and shadow sprites are pre-rendered at different sizes.

== Reception ==
Reception

Aggregate score
Aggregator	Score
GameRankings	54% (retrospective)

Review scores
Publication	Score
ACE	930/1000
Computer and Video Games	89%
Famitsu	5/5
The Games Machine (UK)	85%
Compute's Guide	21/25
Mega	51%
MegaTech	76%

In 1989, ACE magazine listed Space Harrier II as one of the top three best games available for the Mega Drive at the time, along with Altered Beast and Thunder Force II.
