= Puzzle & Action: Ichidant-R =

1994 video game

- Developer: Sega
- Publisher: Sega
- Platforms: Arcade, Game Gear, Mega Drive, Saturn, PlayStation 2
- Release: Arcade: JP: 1994; KR: 1994; EU: 1994; Game Gear: JP: 25 November 1994; Mega Drive: JP: 13 January 1995; Saturn: JP: 27 December 1996
- Genre: Puzzle
- Modes: Single-player, multiplayer
- Arcade system: Sega System C-2

Puzzle & Action: Ichidant-R (Note: (also known as just Ichidant-R (イチダントアール)) is a puzzle video game developed and released by Sega in 1994 for the Sega System C-2. It is the sequel to Puzzle & Action: Tant-R and is the second of the Puzzle & Action series. Gameplay is similar to Tant-R: the player must complete a series of mini-games, although its crime theme is replaced with a medieval theme. The detectives from the first game return and play the role of knights in a theatre play. An English version of the game exists, which replaces the Japanese voices with English voices. The Korean version also uses the English voices. The game was ported to the Game Gear in 1994, Mega Drive in 1995, and released on the Sega Ages Rouka ni Ichidant-R (Note: Rouka ni Ichidant-R (廊下にイチダントアール, Rōka ni Ichidanto Āru)) compilation for the Sega Saturn. The game was released for the Wii Virtual Console in 2007. All console versions except for the Switch version are Japanese exclusives. The third and final game in the series, Puzzle & Action: Treasure Hunt, was released in 1995.

== Gameplay ==
A mini-game. The player must construct the rocket by selecting the correct pieces having matching connectors and colours.

Gameplay remains the same as in Tant-R, consisting of four rounds of a certain number of mini-games, and the game selection rotates so the player must time the selection right for desired game. There are twenty games, many of which follow similar concepts to games in Tant-R: some require the user to press the button at the correct moment, others require the player to memorise and follow a sequence, and some require the player to select the correct option from many incorrect options. Certain games are based on Tant-R games. One such game is where the player, using the hints provided, must select the correct door from a range consisting of various shapes, sizes, and colours. Occasionally, like in Tant-R, a game will become "Lucky!", which plays a random game and grants an extra life, unlike in Tant-R where this option only grants the player a piece, and all must be collected to gain an extra life. At the end of each round there is a bonus stage, but instead of flying an aeroplane like in Tant-R, the player must jump in order to pop balloons. Like in Tant-R, an extra life is granted if a sufficient number are popped. Making mistakes or running out of time costs the player lives.

Like in Tant-R the Mega Drive version includes a "free" mode where players can practise the games. Ichidant-R features a new RPG-style "quest" mode. In this mode, the princess has been kidnapped, and Philosopher's Stones must be collected.

== Ports ==
The arcade version of the game received its first port on the Sega Ages lineup for the Nintendo Switch in September 2019.

== Reception ==
In Japan, Game Machine listed Puzzle & Action: Ichidant-R on their August 15, 1994 issue as being the seventh most-successful table arcade unit of the month.
