= Space Harrier 3-D =

1988 video game

- North American and European box art
- Developer: Sega
- Publisher: Sega
- Series: Space Harrier
- Platform: Master System
- Release: JP: February 29, 1988; NA: July 1988; EU: 1988
- Genre: Rail shooter
- Mode: Single-player

Space Harrier 3-D (スペースハリアー3D, Supēsu Hariā Surī Dī) is a 1988 rail shooter video game developed and published by Sega for the Master System. It is a sequel to the original Space Harrier, released in 1985.

== Plot ==
Space Harrier 3-D is a game in which the Space Harrier must find the missing Euria who is heir to the throne which will end the plans of a tyrant who wants to corrupt the Land of the Dragons. The player character can run on the ground or fly with the aid of a flight belt. The player must defeat an evil captain at the end of each stage, and after completing all 13 stages, the player will need to fight the captains again, one at a time in order; after that, the evil king personally tries to prevent the player from stopping his tyranny.

== Gameplay ==
Space Harrier 3-D is a fast-paced three-dimensional action game. Like the original, the game involves a superhuman hero who runs and flies towards a forever distant background on a checkerboard-styled ground. As the playing field moves forward, enemies come from behind and from the far distance to attack the character, by either firing a projectile or trying to crash into him. The player must also dodge large objects in his path, some of which can be destroyed. One hit from an enemy or a crash into these large objects will cause the player to lose a life.

Playing the game requires the SegaScope 3-D Glasses. Upon achieving a high score to input a name, a cheat code is available in the game to disable the 3-D effects, which is difficult to achieve without the glasses due to the distortion caused by the 3-D effects.

== Reception ==
The game was reviewed in 1989 in Dragon #144 by Hartley, Patricia, and Kirk Lesser in "The Role of Computers" column. The reviewers gave the game 4.5 out of 5 stars.

== Reviews ==
- Computer and Video Games - June 1988
- Tilt - July 1988
- ASM (Aktueller Software Markt) - November 1988

== Port ==
The game was later ported for 3DS by M2 and released as a part of Sega 3D Fukkoku Archives on 18 December 2014.
