= R360 =

Arcade cabinet

- Manufacturer: Sega
- Type: Arcade cabinet
- Generation: Fourth generation
- Released: JP: November 1990; WW: Early 1991
- Units shipped: ≈100-200
- Successor: R360Z

The R360 is a motion-based arcade cabinet produced by Sega. It was first released in Japan in 1990, and internationally a year later. Being short for "Rotate 360", the R360 is noteworthy for its ability to spin 360 degrees in any direction on two metal axes, allowing the player to freely move as the cabinet mimics the in-game action, including the ability to turn completely upside down. A safety bar and four-point safety harness are utilized to keep players in the seat as the machine moves. An emergency stop button is also present both inside the machine and on the attendant tower.

Designed by Sega AM2, the R360 was part of the company's movement to create attraction-like games for Japanese amusement centers. Only two compatible games were produced: G-LOC: Air Battle in 1990, and Wing War in 1994. An R360 unit demonstrating Rad Mobile was demonstrated in Japan, but was never publicly released. The cabinet was commercially unsuccessful, with only an estimated 100 units being produced and fewer being sold. Critics commended the R360 for its unique and technologically advanced concept, with one critic saying it helped represent Sega's massive presence in the arcade industry. A successor, the R360Z, was released in 2015 for Transformers: Human Alliance, which can seat two players.

== Technical specifications ==
The R360 was designed by Sega AM2. Its name is short for "Rotate 360", representative of the cabinet's ability to spin 360 degrees in any direction. Physically, the unit is 7 feet (210 cm) in diameter and 8 feet (240 cm) tall. It weighs over 2,200 pounds (1,000 kg), and utilizes a 20-inch (51 cm) monitor for gameplay. The cabinet is mounted on a gyroscope that can rotate along two axes, attached to a base which is stationary.

A safety bar and four-point safety harness are utilized to keep players in the seat as the machine moves. Additionally, light sensors would stop the machine if a player extended an arm or leg outside the cabinet; this feature caused an issue if the R360 sat in direct sunlight. Two emergency stop buttons are present; one is inside the arcade cabinet and the second is on an attendant tower. A sensor grid triggers an alarm if the cabinet is approached while the game is in motion. While the attendant tower and the cabinet itself of the R360 featured coin slots, arcade operators were strongly warned not to allow the game to be played without an attendant and the safety fence, for fear of someone losing a limb or being killed by the moving machine. Attendants were also necessary if the emergency stop features were triggered; a button on the attendant tower would allow them to reset the machine and prevent players from being stuck upside down. By Sega's recommendation, players are barred from using the R360 if they have heart conditions, are intoxicated, pregnant, have high or low blood pressure, have been advised against strenuous activity, or have "mental or physical problems."

== History ==
The R360 was first tested in Sega's Tokyo arcades in early 1990, and given a broader release later that year. It was advertised in Sega Visions in the US as early as winter 1990-91 and exhibited in the UK Amusement Trades Exhibition International in 1991. During the 1992 Summer Olympics in Barcelona, Sega installed an R360 simulator at an entertainment facility for athletes in the Olympic Village. The facility also contained 200 Mega Drive consoles, 60 Game Gear handhelds, 11 arcade machines and more than 1,200 game cartridges. Spanish magazine Hobby Consolas reported that Crown Prince Felipe de Borbón visited the facility and played the R360. In November 1992, French magazine Mega Force reported that the R360 was available at an amusement arcade on Boulevard de Sébastopol, near Châtelet in Paris, describing it as the only venue in France operating the simulator at the time. The magazine's reporter personally tested the machine and praised the experience. Sega initially classified the game as a ride, and included G-LOC: Air Battle as the included game. Players were capable of playing the game or simply selecting "experience" to ride the cabinet as the game ran through its demo mode. G-LOC: Air Battle operates on the Sega Y Board for its arcade system board. An R360 unit playing Rad Mobile was demonstrated in Japan, but never confirmed to have a release. An additional release for the cabinet came in 1994 with Wing War, a Model 1 arcade board release. Wing War for the R360 required two cabinets to be linked.

According to The One, the R360 cost "over £70,000" in 1991, while R360 collector Kevin Keinert placed the price at $90,000 or more. This meant only the largest arcade operators could afford the machine. The Funland Arcade in the Trocadero Complex charged £3 per ride in 1991; in the United States, the play price varied between $3 and $5. Additional costs to the machine came in repairs. Sega did not include schematics with the R360, and the cabinet's circuitry was complex and prone to failure.

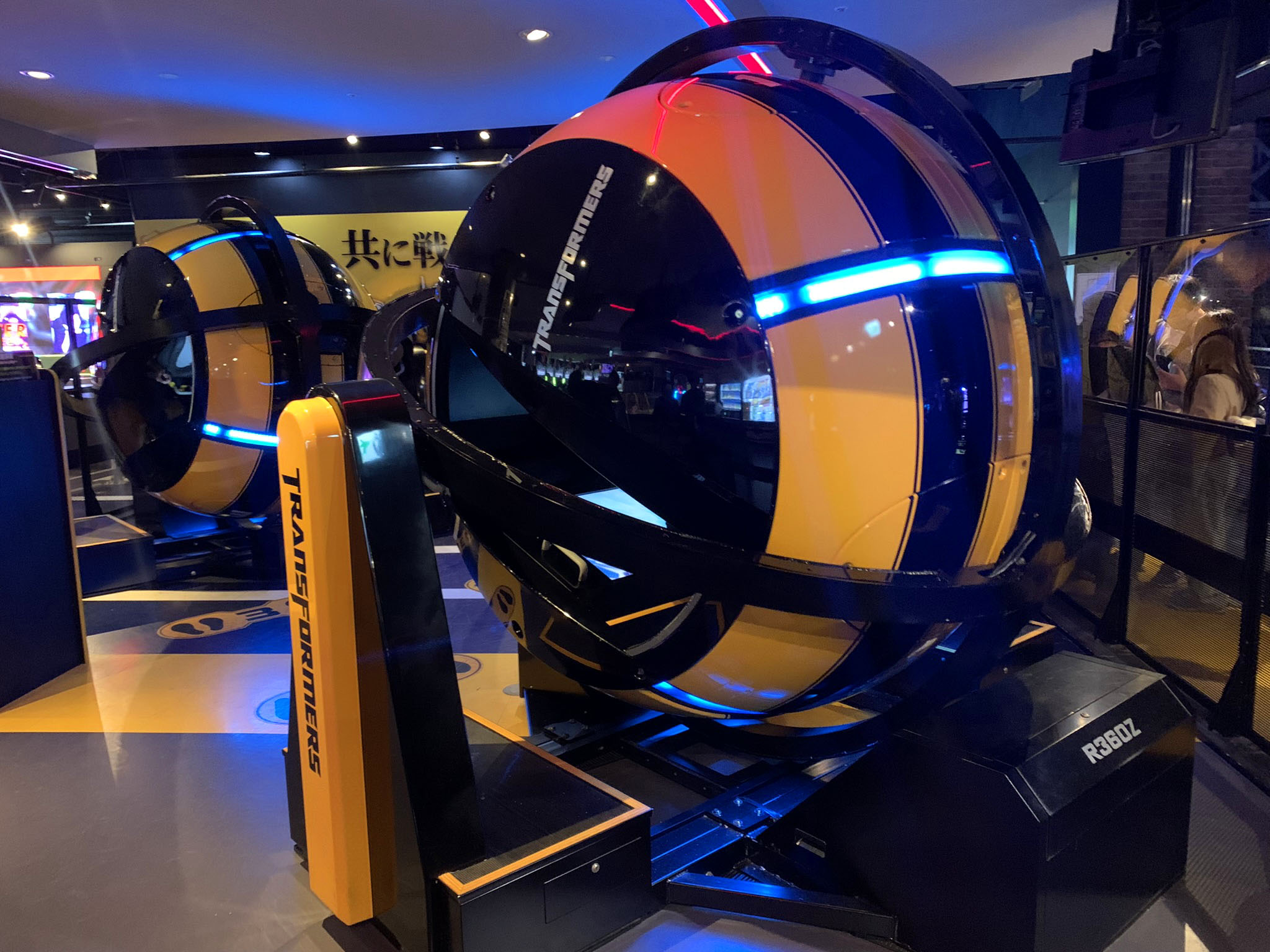
A Sega R360Z at Tokyo Joypolis

Sega stopped manufacturing the R360 within a few years. No official figure on how many cabinets were sold has been released; according to Keinert, contact with Sega has been returned by calling that number a "company secret". He estimates that between 100 and 200 units were made. In 2015, Sega introduced a motion simulator attraction based on its arcade game Transformers: Human Alliance at Joypolis. The attraction utilizes a new version of the R360, labeled as "R360Z", which seats two passengers.

== Reception ==
British gaming magazine The One reviewed the R360 in 1991, playing G-LOC: Air Battle, and begins their review by expressing that "what the R360 delivers is the greatest sensory overload you are ever likely to get without taking your trousers off ... this is a unit that will turn your whole idea of what a coin-op is upside-down." The One noted that the R360 made them nauseated from motion sickness, but despite this they excitedly stated that the R360's gameplay is "an experience!!!" Cash Box was enamored by the machine's unique concept and capabilities, exclaiming: "This is not just a video game, it is a video experience which will make your heart pound and adrenalin flow as you engage in high speed air battle and dog fighting!" Video game journalist Ken Horowitz called the R360's existence a notable one for its demonstrating Sega's desire to create bigger and more realistic games. Retrospectively in 2019, Retro Gamer said that the R360 helped represent Sega's massive presence in the arcade game market for its unique and interesting idea, writing that it is "the pinnacle of what could be achieved in videogames at the time and shows the dominance Sega had in the industry."
