= Golden Axe: The Duel =

1995 video game

- Japanese arcade flyer
- Developer: Sega AM1
- Publisher: Sega
- Composer: Kazuhiko Nagai
- Series: Golden Axe
- Platforms: Arcade, Sega Saturn
- Release: Arcade: JP: February 1995; Saturn: JP: September 29, 1995; EU: December 1995; NA: June 27, 1996
- Genre: Fighting
- Modes: Single-player, multiplayer
- Arcade system: ST-V

Golden Axe: The Duel (Note: Japanese: ゴールデンアックス・ザ・デュエル, Hepburn: Gooruden Akkusu Za De~yueru) is a 1995 fighting game developed and published by Sega for arcades. and it is a Sequel to Golden Axe III and it's The Fourth installment in the Golden Axe Series and The game was later ported to the Sega Saturn.

== Gameplay ==
Golden Axe: The Duel is a two-dimensional fighting game featuring ten playable characters. Players compete in one-on-one battles, with each character possessing distinct attacks and special techniques. The game features a single-player mode against computer-controlled opponents and a two-player versus mode. During matches, thieves occasionally appear and can be attacked to obtain items that enhance the fighters' abilities, including the use of powerful magic attacks.

The Saturn version includes three adjustable gameplay speed settings: Slow, Normal and Fast. The Slow setting reproduces the arcade version's speed, while the remaining settings offer progressively faster gameplay.

== Plot ==
Eighty years after the evil Death Adder was slain by Gillius Thunderhead, (Note: As depicted in Golden Axe: The Revenge of Death Adder) the magical Golden Axe is rediscovered, its powers having grown over time. Numerous warriors now fight to obtain the powerful axe. These include Kain Blade, a wandering swordsman; Milan Flare, a princess and descendant of Tyris Flare; Gillius Rockhead, great grandson of Gillius Thunderhead; Zoma, a power-hungry sorcerer; Doc, a katana-wielding healer; Keel, an elf who is brainwashed into a bloodthirsty serial killer; Jamm, a girl raised by beasts; Panchos, a bomb-maker and inventor; Green, a giant human-plant hybrid; and Death Adder, revealed to have survived his supposed demise.

== Development and release ==
Golden Axe: The Duel was developed by Sega's AM1 division for the company's ST-V arcade hardware, which shared much of its architecture with the Sega Saturn. The ST-V system was designed as a less expensive alternative to Sega's Model 2 arcade hardware, allowing games to be converted to the Saturn with relatively few changes. The game was unveiled at the 1995 Amusement Operators' Union (AOU) show in Tokyo.

In April 1995, the Japanese Sega Saturn Magazine announced that the game would be converted to the Saturn, reporting its development as 80% complete. The magazine subsequently reported completion figures of 85% in August and 99% in September, before announcing that the conversion had reached 100% in its October issue.

The Saturn conversion sought to reproduce the arcade version's graphics, animation and gameplay while introducing additional configuration options. British magazine Computer and Video Games described the conversion as particularly faithful because of the similarities between the Saturn and ST-V hardware. Mean Machines Sega likewise praised the close reproduction of the arcade game in its December 1995 preview.

== Reception ==
Reception

Review scores
Publication	Score
AllGame	2.5/5
Computer and Video Games	82/100
Electronic Gaming Monthly	6/10, 6/10, 6.5/10, 6/10
EP Daily	7.5/10
Game Informer	6/10
Game Players	63%
GameFan	89/100, 79/100, 77/100; 80/100, 80/100, 77/100
Hyper	76/100
Mean Machines Sega	85/100
Next Generation	3/5
Intelligent Gamer	B-
Maximum	3/5
Sega Power	70%
Sega Pro	84%
Sega Saturn Magazine (JP)	7/10
Sega Saturn Magazine (UK)	85%
VideoGames	7/10

Golden Axe: The Duel received a score of 7.0253 out of 10 in a 2000 readers' poll conducted by the Japanese Sega Saturn Magazine, ranking among Saturn titles at the number 637 spot. The Saturn version was met with mixed reception from critics. Sega Saturn Magazine's Tom Guise praised the "arcade exact" conversion, the potion-dropping imp mechanic, the impressive graphics, and the music, but felt that the game was "outclassed" by the imminent ports of Virtua Fighter 2 and X-Men: Children of the Atom. Maximum judged the game to be decent in both playability and graphics, but highly criticized the lack of originality, and complained that the potion-dropping imp mechanic makes executing super moves overly convoluted. They summarized the game as "a clear example of competent programmers coding up a lacking concept".

The four reviewers of Electronic Gaming Monthly also praised the potion-dropping imp mechanic, but felt that the game simply did not stand out from previous 2D fighters, and in particular its visuals were overly similar to Samurai Shodown. Next Generation called it "solid, if uninspired". He elaborated the animation, graphics, control interface, and special moves hold up to the best fighting games released during the 16-bit era, which simultaneously places it as both a generation out-of-date and a recommended title for fans of old 2D fighting games. GamePro's Lawrence Neves said it was "a lame fighting game at its best", citing the dull moves, absence of combos, and the difficulty in getting the moves to work.
