= List of Sega mobile games =

The following is a list of mobile games developed or published by Sega.

== Games ==
Year	Title	Genre(s)	Developer(s)	System(s)	JP	NA	EU	Ref(s)
2003	Adios Amebas	Shoot em' up	Sega Mobile	Mobile			Yes	
2003	Baku Baku Animal	Puzzle	Sega Mobile	Mobile		Yes		
2003	Blob Busters	Puzzle	Sega Mobile	Mobile		Yes		
2003	Break the Eggs	Puzzle	Sega Mobile	Mobile		Yes		
2003	Depth Charge	Action	Sega Mobile	Mobile		Yes		
2003	Fantasy Zone	Shoot em' up	Sega Mobile	Mobile		Yes		
2003	Flicky	Action	Sega Mobile	Mobile		Yes		
2003	Galaxy Patrol	Strategy	Sega Mobile	Mobile		Yes		
2003	Home Run King	Sports	Sega Mobile	Mobile		Yes		
2003	Krazy Kings	Strategy	Sega Mobile	Mobile		Yes		
2003	Pengo	Action	Sega Mobile	Mobile		Yes		
2003	Penguin Luv	Puzzle	Sega Mobile	Mobile		Yes		
2003	Puyo Puyo	Puzzle	Sega Mobile	Mobile		Yes		
2003	Sega Fast Lane	Racing	Sega Mobile	Mobile		Yes		
2003	Sega Home Run King 2	Sports	Sega Mobile	Mobile		Yes		
2003	Sega Mobile BaseBall	Sports	Sega Mobile	Mobile		Yes		
2003	Sega Super Monkey Ball	Puzzle	Sega Mobile	Mobile		Yes		
2003	Sega Snowboarding	Sports	Sega Mobile	Mobile		Yes		
2003	Sega Soccer Slam	Sports	Sega Mobile	Mobile		Yes		
2003	Sega Sports Mobile Golf	Sports	Sega Mobile	Mobile		Yes		
2003	Shiftris	Puzzle	Sega Mobile	Mobile		Yes		
2003	Slidin' Smiley	Puzzle	Sega Mobile	Mobile		Yes		
2003	Space Gunner	Action	Sega Mobile	Mobile		Yes		
2003	Space Spyders	Adventure	Sega Mobile	Mobile		Yes		
2003	Tricky Third	Gambling	Sega Mobile	Mobile		Yes		
2003	Vectorman	Action	Sega Mobile	Mobile		Yes		
2004	J.League Pro Soccer Club o Tsukurou! Mobile	Sports	Sega Mobile	Mobile	Yes			
2004	Phantasy Star	RPG	Sega Mobile	Mobile	Yes			
2004	Sega Rally Championship	Racing	Sega Mobile	Mobile		Yes		
2004	Sonic N	Platform	Sega Mobile	Mobile		Yes		
2004	Super Real Tennis	Sports	Sega WOW	Mobile		Yes		
2004	Outrun	Driving	Sega Mobile	Mobile		Yes		
2004	Virtua Tennis	Sports	Sega Mobile	Mobile		Yes		
2005	After Burner	Shoot em' up	Sega Mobile	Mobile		Yes		
2005	J.League Pro Soccer Club o Tsukurou! Mobile 2	Sports	Sega Mobile	Mobile	Yes			
2005	J.League Pro Soccer Club o Tsukurou! Mobile 3	Sports	Sega Mobile	Mobile	Yes			
2005	Pocket Kingdom	Strategy	Sega Mobile	Mobile		Yes		
2005	Shining Force Chronicle	Strategy	Sega Mobile	Mobile	Yes			
2005	Shining Force Chronicle II	Strategy	Sega Mobile	Mobile	Yes			
2006	Shining Force Chronicle III	Strategy	Sega Mobile	Mobile	Yes			
2006	Shining Road: To The Dragon	Strategy	Sega Mobile	Mobile	Yes			
2007	Shining Force EXA Mobile	Action RPG	Sega Mobile	Mobile	Yes			
2008	Columns Deluxe	Puzzle	Sega Mobile	Mobile		Yes		
2008	Shining Wind X	RPG	Sega Mobile	Mobile	Yes			
2008	Super Monkey Ball	Puzzle	Sega Mobile	iOS	Yes	Yes	Yes	
2009	Puyo Puyo Fever Touch	Puzzle	Sega Mobile	iOS	Yes			
2010	ChuChu Rocket!	Puzzle	Binary Hammer	iOS	Yes	Yes	Yes	
2010	Football Manager Handheld 2010	Sports, Simulation	Sports Interactive	iOS		Yes		
2010	Football Manager Handheld 2011	Sports, Simulation	Sports Interactive	iOS		Yes		
2010	Kingdom Conquest	Action RPG, CCG, Simulation	Sega	iOS	Yes	Yes	Yes	
2010	Sonic the Hedgehog 4: Episode 1	Platform	Sega (Sonic Team), Dimps	iOS	Yes	Yes	Yes	
2010	Sonic and Sega All-Stars Racing	Racing	Sumo Racing	iOS	Yes	Yes	Yes	
2010	Sonic at the Olympic Winter Games	Sports	Venan Entertainment	iOS	Yes	Yes	Yes	
2010	Super Monkey Ball 2: Sakura Edition	Platform	Other Ocean	iOS	Yes	Yes	Yes	
2011	Brick People	Puzzle	Sega	iOS	Yes	Yes	Yes	
2011	Fallen Realms	RPG	Papaya	Android		Yes	Yes	
2011	Football Manager Handheld 2012	Sports, Simulation	Sports Interactive	iOS		Yes	Yes	
2011	Kingdom Conquest	Action RPG, CCG, Simulation	Sega	Android	Yes	Yes	Yes	
2011	Samurai Bloodshow	CCG	Sega	iOS	Yes	Yes	Yes	
2011	Sega Bass Fishing Challenge	Simulation	Sega	iOS		Yes	Yes	
2011	Sonic CD	Platform	Christian Whitehead	iOS	Yes	Yes	Yes	
2011	Sonic CD	Platform	Christian Whitehead	Android	Yes	Yes	Yes	
2012	Alexandria Bloodshow	CCG	Sega	iOS	Yes	Yes	Yes	
2012	Crazy Taxi	Driving	Sega	iOS	Yes	Yes	Yes	
2012	Dragon Coins	RPG	Sega	iOS	Yes	Yes	Yes	
2012	Football Manager Handheld 2012	Sports, Simulation	Sports Interactive	Android		Yes	Yes	
2012	Football Manager Handheld 2013	Sports, Simulation	Sports Interactive	iOS		Yes	Yes	
2012	Football Manager Handheld 2013	Sports, Simulation	Sports Interactive	Android		Yes	Yes	
2012	Hatsune Miku Live Stage Producer	Simulation	Sega	iOS	Yes			
2012	Hatsune Miku Live Stage Producer	Simulation	Sega	Android	Yes			
2012	Jack Lumber	Action	Owlchemy Labs	iOS		Yes	Yes	
2012	Kingdom Conquest II	Action RPG, CCG, Simulation	Sega	Android	Yes	Yes	Yes	
2012	Mekutte! Hitsuji Mu Chang	Puzzle	Sega	iOS	Yes			
2012	Miku Flick	Rhythm	Sega	iOS	Yes	Yes	Yes	
2012	Sonic Jump	Action	Hardlight	iOS	Yes	Yes	Yes	
2012	Sonic Jump	Action	Hardlight	Android	Yes	Yes	Yes	
2012	Sonic the Hedgehog 4: Episode 1	Platform	Sega (Sonic Team), Dimps	Android	Yes	Yes	Yes	
2012	Sonic the Hedgehog 4: Episode 2	Platform	Sega (Sonic Team), Dimps	iOS	Yes	Yes	Yes	
2012	Sonic the Hedgehog 4: Episode 2	Platform	Sega (Sonic Team), Dimps	Android	Yes	Yes	Yes	
2012	Super Monkey Ball 2: Sakura Edition	Platform	Other Ocean	Android	Yes	Yes	Yes	
2012	The Flick of the Dead	Action	Sega	iOS	Yes			
2012	Virtua Tennis Challenge	Sports	Sega	iOS	Yes	Yes	Yes	
2012	Virtua Tennis Challenge	Sports	Sega	Android	Yes	Yes	Yes	
2012	Zaxxon Escape	Shoot-em'-up	Free Range Games	iOS	Yes	Yes	Yes	
2012	Zaxxon Escape	Shoot-em'-up	Free Range Games	Android	Yes	Yes	Yes	
2013	After Burner Climax	Rail shooter	Fishing Cactus	iOS	Yes	Yes	Yes	
2013	After Burner Climax	Rail shooter	Fishing Cactus	Android	Yes	Yes	Yes	
2013	Border Break Mobile: Gun Front Hurricane	RPG	f4 Samurai	iOS	Yes			
2013	Border Break Mobile: Gun Front Hurricane	RPG	f4 Samurai	Android	Yes			
2013	Chain Chronicle	CCG, RPG	Sega	iOS	Yes	Yes	Yes	
2013	Chain Chronicle	CCG, RPG	Sega	Android	Yes	Yes	Yes	
2013	Crazy Taxi	Driving	Sega	Android	Yes	Yes	Yes	
2013	Champion Football	Sports, Simulation	Sega	iOS	Yes			
2013	Champion Football	Sports, Simulation	Sega	Android	Yes			
2013	Demon Tribe	Action, CCG, Strategy	Sega	iOS	Yes	Yes	Yes	
2013	Demon Tribe	Action, CCG, Strategy	Sega	Android	Yes	Yes	Yes	
2013	Derby Owners Club	Sports, Simulation	Sega	iOS	Yes			
2013	Derby Owners Club	Sports, Simulation	Sega	Android	Yes			
2013	Dragon Coins	RPG	Sega	Android	Yes	Yes	Yes	
2013	Football Manager Handheld 2014	Sports, Simulation	Sports Interactive	iOS		Yes	Yes	
2013	Football Manager Handheld 2014	Sports, Simulation	Sports Interactive	Android		Yes	Yes	
2013	Go Dance	Rhythm	Sega	iOS	Yes	Yes	Yes	
2013	Gundam Conquest	Action RPG, CCG, Simulation	Bandai Namco, Sega	iOS	Yes			
2013	Gundam Conquest	Action RPG, CCG, Simulation	Bandai Namco, Sega	iOS	Yes			
2013	Godsrule: War of Mortals	Simulation	Gogogic	iOS		Yes	Yes	
2013	Hell Yeah! Pocket Inferno	Action	Arkedo Studio	iOS	Yes	Yes	Yes	
2013	Hell Yeah! Pocket Inferno	Action	Arkedo Studio	Android		Yes	Yes	
2013	Miku Flick 2	Rhythm	Sega	iOS	Yes	Yes	Yes	
2013	Pro Yakyuu Team mo Tsukurou!	Sports, Simulation	Sega	iOS	Yes			
2013	Pro Yakyuu Team mo Tsukurou!	Sports, Simulation	Sega	Android	Yes			
2013	Puyo Puyo!! Quest	Puzzle	Sega	iOS	Yes			
2013	Puyo Puyo!! Quest	Puzzle	Sega	Android	Yes			
2013	Puzzle Pirates	Puzzle	Three Rings Design	iOS		Yes	Yes	
2013	Sankatsu Shoot	Sports	Sega	iOS	Yes			
2013	Sankatsu Shoot	Sports	Sega	Android	Yes			
2013	Sega Network Taisen Mahjong Taisen MJ Mobile	Tabletop	Sega	iOS	Yes	Yes	Yes	
2013	Spellwood Lite	Puzzle	Three Rings Design	iOS	Yes	Yes	Yes	
2013	Spellwood Lite	Puzzle	Three Rings Design	Android	Yes	Yes	Yes	
2013	Sonic and Sega All-Stars Racing	Racing	Sumo Digital	Android	Yes	Yes	Yes	
2013	Sonic Dash	Action	Hardlight	iOS	Yes	Yes	Yes	
2013	Sonic Dash	Action	Hardlight	Android	Yes	Yes	Yes	
2013	Sonic the Hedgehog	Platform	Christian Whitehead	iOS	Yes	Yes	Yes	
2013	Sonic the Hedgehog	Platform	Christian Whitehead	Android	Yes	Yes	Yes	
2013	Sonic the Hedgehog 2	Platform	Christian Whitehead	iOS	Yes	Yes	Yes	
2013	Sonic the Hedgehog 2	Platform	Christian Whitehead	Android	Yes	Yes	Yes	
2013	The Cave	Adventure	Double Fine Productions	iOS	Yes	Yes	Yes	
2013	The Cave	Adventure	Double Fine Productions	Android		Yes	Yes	
2013	The House of the Dead: Overkill- The Lost Reels	Action	Headstrong Games	iOS	Yes	Yes	Yes	
2013	The House of the Dead: Overkill- The Lost Reels	Action	Headstrong Games	Android	Yes	Yes	Yes	
2014	Ange Vierge	CCG, RPG	Sega	iOS	Yes			
2014	Ange Vierge	CCG, RPG	Sega	Android	Yes			
2014	Crazy Taxi: City Rush	Driving	Hardlight	iOS	Yes	Yes	Yes	
2014	Crazy Taxi: City Rush	Driving	Hardlight	Android	Yes	Yes	Yes	
2014	Football Manager Handheld 2015	Sports, Simulation	Sports Interactive	iOS		Yes	Yes	
2014	Football Manager Handheld 2015	Sports, Simulation	Sports Interactive	Android		Yes	Yes	
2014	Fuuin Yuusha	RPG	Sega	iOS	Yes			
2014	Fuuin Yuusha	RPG	Sega	Android	Yes			
2014	Girls Holic	Simulation	Sega	iOS	Yes			
2014	Girls Holic	Simulation	Sega	Android	Yes			
2014	Phantasy Star Online 2 es	RPG	Sega	iOS	Yes			
2014	Phantasy Star Online 2 es	RPG	Sega	Android	Yes			
2014	Phantom Tower Senki Griffon	RPG	Aiming	iOS	Yes			
2014	Phantom Tower Senki Griffon	RPG	Aiming	Android	Yes			
2014	Rhythm Thief & the Paris Caper	Rhythm	Sega, xeen	iOS	Yes	Yes	Yes	
2014	Sega Network Taisen Mahjong Taisen MJ Mobile	Tabletop	Sega	Android	Yes	Yes	Yes	
2014	Sonic & All-Stars Racing Transformed	Racing	Sumo Digital	iOS	Yes	Yes	Yes	
2014	Sonic & All-Stars Racing Transformed	Racing	Sumo Digital	Android	Yes	Yes	Yes	
2014	Sonic Jump Fever	Action	Hardlight	iOS	Yes	Yes	Yes	
2014	Sonic Jump Fever	Action	Hardlight	Android	Yes	Yes	Yes	
2014	Super Monkey Ball Bounce	Puzzle	Sega	iOS		Yes	Yes	
2014	Super Monkey Ball Bounce	Puzzle	Sega	Android		Yes	Yes	
2014	Time Labyrinth	RPG	AppBank	iOS	Yes			
2014	Time Labyrinth	RPG	AppBank	Android	Yes			
2014	Treachery of Ciel Ark	RPG	Axel Mark	iOS	Yes			
2014	Treachery of Ciel Ark	RPG	Axel Mark	Android	Yes			
2015	Chaos Dragon: Konton Senso	RPG	Sega	iOS	Yes			
2015	Chaos Dragon: Konton Senso	RPG	Sega	Android	Yes			
2015	Cranky Food Friends	Puzzle	Sega	iOS		Yes	Yes	
2015	Cranky Food Friends	Puzzle	Sega	Android		Yes	Yes	
2015	Dragon Parade	Action	Axel Game Studio	iOS	Yes			
2015	Dragon Parade	Action	Axel Game Studio	Android	Yes			
2015	Fortisia SegaxLINE	RPG	Sega	iOS	Yes			
2015	Fortisia SegaxLINE	RPG	Sega	Android	Yes			
2015	Football Manager Touch 2016	Sports, Simulation	Sports Interactive	iOS		Yes	Yes	
2015	Football Manager Touch 2016	Sports, Simulation	Sports Interactive	Android		Yes	Yes	
2015	Heroki	Action	Picomy Games	iOS	Yes			
2015	Hortensia Saga	RPG	f4 Samurai	iOS	Yes			
2015	Hortensia Saga	RPG	f4 Samurai	Android	Yes			
2015	Mekutte! Hitsuji Mu Chang	Puzzle	Sega	Android	Yes			
2015	Monster Gear	Action RPG	Sega	iOS	Yes			
2015	Monster Gear	Action RPG	Sega	Android	Yes			
2015	Puyo Puyo!!Touch	Puzzle	Sega	iOS	Yes			
2015	Puyo Puyo!!Touch	Puzzle	Sega	Android	Yes			
2015	Puzzle & Glory	Puzzle	Demiurge Studios	iOS		Yes	Yes	
2015	Puzzle & Glory	Puzzle	Demiurge Studios	Android		Yes	Yes	
2015	Rise of Knights	Action RPG	Three Rings Design	iOS		Yes	Yes	
2015	Rise of Knights	Action RPG	Three Rings Design	Android		Yes	Yes	
2015	Squads	RPG	Sega	iOS	Yes			
2015	Squads	RPG	Sega	Android	Yes			
2015	Sonic Runners	Action	Sega	iOS	Yes	Yes	Yes	
2015	Sonic Runners	Action	Sega	Android	Yes	Yes	Yes	
2015	Sonic Dash 2: Sonic Boom	Action	Hardlight	iOS		Yes	Yes	
2015	Sonic Dash 2: Sonic Boom	Action	Hardlight	Android		Yes	Yes	
2015	Super Robot Taisen X-Omega	CCG, RPG	Bandai Namco, Sega	iOS	Yes			
2015	Super Robot Taisen X-Omega	CCG, RPG	Bandai Namco, Sega	Android	Yes			
2015	The World End Eclipse	RPG	Sega	iOS	Yes			
2015	The World End Eclipse	RPG	Sega	Android	Yes			
2015	War Pirates	RPG	Sega	iOS	Yes	Yes	Yes	
2015	War Pirates	RPG	Sega	Android	Yes	Yes	Yes	
2015	Yumeiro Cast	Simulation	Sega	iOS	Yes			
2015	Yumeiro Cast	Simulation	Sega	Android	Yes			
2016	Football Manager Touch 2017	Sports, Simulation	Sports Interactive	iOS		Yes	Yes	
2016	Football Manager Touch 2017	Sports, Simulation	Sports Interactive	Android		Yes	Yes	
2016	Liberasion of azure	RPG	Sega	iOS	Yes			
2016	Liberasion of azure	RPG	Sega	Android	Yes			
2016	Soul Reverse Zero	RPG	Sega (AM2)	iOS	Yes			
2016	Soul Reverse Zero	RPG	Sega (AM2)	Android	Yes			
2016	Total War Battles: KINGDOM	Strategy	Creative Assembly	iOS		Yes	Yes	
2016	Total War Battles: KINGDOM	Strategy	Creative Assembly	Android		Yes	Yes	
2016	World Chain	RPG	Sega	iOS	Yes			
2016	World Chain	RPG	Sega	Android	Yes			
2016	Wonderland LIBRARY APP	Non-game	Sega	iOS	Yes			
2016	Wonderland LIBRARY APP	Non-game	Sega	Android	Yes			
2017	Crazy Taxi Gazillionaire	Simulation	Demiurge Studio	iOS		Yes	Yes	
2017	Crazy Taxi Gazillionaire	Simulation	Demiurge Studio	Android		Yes	Yes	
2017	Code of Joker Pocket	CCG	Sega	iOS	Yes			
2017	Code of Joker Pocket	CCG	Sega	Android	Yes			
2017	Football Manager Touch 2018	Sports, Simulation	Sports Interactive	iOS		Yes	Yes	
2017	Football Manager Touch 2018	Sports, Simulation	Sports Interactive	Android		Yes	Yes	
2017	Pashamon	RPG	Sega	iOS	Yes			
2017	Pashamon	RPG	Sega	Android	Yes			
2017	Pop in Q: Dance for Quintet!	Rhythm	Sega	iOS	Yes			
2017	Pop in Q: Dance for Quintet!	Rhythm	Sega	Android	Yes			
2017	Sanpoke: Sangokushi Taisen Pocket	Puzzle	Sega	iOS	Yes			
2017	Sanpoke: Sangokushi Taisen Pocket	Puzzle	Sega	Android	Yes			
2017	StarHorse Pocket	Simulation	Sega	iOS	Yes			
2017	StarHorse Pocket	Simulation	Sega	Android	Yes			
2017	Sonic Forces: Speed Battle	Action	Hardlight	iOS		Yes	Yes	
2017	Sonic Forces: Speed Battle	Action	Hardlight	Android		Yes	Yes	
2017	WWE Tap Mania	Action	The Tap Lab	iOS		Yes		
2017	WWE Tap Mania	Action	The Tap Lab	Android		Yes		
2018	Football Manager 2019 Mobile	Sports, Simulation	Sports Interactive	iOS		Yes	Yes	
2018	Football Manager 2019 Mobile	Sports, Simulation	Sports Interactive	Android		Yes	Yes	
2018	Idola Phantasy Star Saga	RPG	Sega	iOS	Yes			
2018	Idola Phantasy Star Saga	RPG	Sega	Android	Yes			
2018	Kyoto Kotoba RPG Kotodaman	RPG	Sega	iOS	Yes			
2018	Kyoto Kotoba RPG Kotodaman	RPG	Sega	Android	Yes			
2018	PoPoLoCrois: Narcia's Tears and the Fairy's Flute	RPG	f4 Samurai	iOS	Yes			
2018	PoPoLoCrois: Narcia's Tears and the Fairy's Flute	RPG	f4 Samurai	Android	Yes			
2018	Ryu Ga Gotoku Online	RPG	Sega	iOS	Yes			
2018	Ryu Ga Gotoku Online	RPG	Sega	Android	Yes			
2018	Sega Heroes	RPG	Demiurge Studios	iOS		Yes	Yes	
2018	Sega Heroes	RPG	Demiurge Studios	Android		Yes	Yes	
2018	Sega Pocket Club Manager	Sports, Simulation	Sega	iOS	Yes	Yes	Yes	
2018	Sega Pocket Club Manager	Sports, Simulation	Sega	Android	Yes	Yes	Yes	
2018	Shin Megami Tensei Liberation Dx2	RPG	Atlus, Sega	iOS	Yes			
2018	Shin Megami Tensei Liberation Dx2	RPG	Atlus, Sega	Android	Yes			
2018	Wonder Gravity: Pino and the Gravity Users	RPG	f4 Samurai	iOS	Yes			
2018	Wonder Gravity: Pino and the Gravity Users	RPG	f4 Samurai	Android	Yes			
2019	ChuChu Rocket! Universe	Puzzle	Hardlight	iOS	Yes	Yes	Yes	
2019	Fist of the North Star: Legends ReVIVE	RPG	Sega	iOS	Yes	Yes	Yes	
2019	Fist of the North Star: Legends ReVIVE	RPG	Sega	Android	Yes	Yes	Yes	
2019	Football Manager 2020 Mobile	Sports, Simulation	Sports Interactive	iOS		Yes	Yes	
2019	Football Manager 2020 Mobile	Sports, Simulation	Sports Interactive	Android				
2019	Kemono Friends 3	RPG	Sega	iOS	Yes			
2019	Revolve8	Strategy	Sega	iOS	Yes	Yes	Yes	
2019	Revolve8	Strategy	Sega	Android	Yes	Yes	Yes	
2019	Sonic Racing	Racing	Sumo Digital	iOS	Yes	Yes	Yes	
2019	League of Wonderland	Strategy	Sega	iOS	Yes	Yes	Yes	
2019	League of Wonderland	Strategy	Sega	Android	Yes	Yes	Yes	
2020	Football Manager 2021 Mobile	Sports, Simulation	Sports Interactive	iOS	Yes	Yes	Yes	
2020	Football Manager 2021 Mobile	Sports, Simulation	Sports Interactive	Android	Yes	Yes	Yes	
2020	Sakura Kakumei: Hanasaku Otome-tachi	RPG	Delightworks	iOS	Yes			
2020	Sakura Kakumei: Hanasaku Otome-tachi	RPG	Delightworks	Android	Yes			
2020	Sonic at the Olympic Games	Sports	Sega	Yes	Yes			
2020	Sonic at the Olympic Games	Sports	Sega	Yes	Yes	Yes		
2021	Project Sekai: Colorful Stage! feat. Hatsune Miku	Rhythm	Colorful Palette	iOS	Yes	Yes	Yes	
2021	Project Sekai: Colorful Stage! feat. Hatsune Miku	Rhythm	Colorful Palette	Android	Yes	Yes	Yes	
2021	Re:Zero - Starting Life in Another World	RPG	Sega	iOS	Yes			
2021	Re:Zero - Starting Life in Another World	RPG	Sega	Android	Yes			
2022	Sin Chronicle	RPG	Sega	iOS	Yes			
2022	Sin Chronicle	RPG	Sega	Android	Yes			
2023	404 GAME RE:SET	RPG	Sega	iOS	Yes			
2023	404 GAME RE:SET	RPG	Sega	Android	Yes			
2023	Samba de Amigo: Party-To-Go	Rhythm	Sega	iOS	Yes	Yes	Yes	
2023	Sonic Dream Team	Platform	Hardlight	iOS	Yes	Yes	Yes	
2023	Sonic Dream Team	Platform	Hardlight	Android	Yes	Yes	Yes	
2024	Puyo Puyo Puzzle Pop	Puzzle	Sega	iOS	Yes	Yes	Yes	
2025	Persona 5: Phantom X	RPG	Atlus, Sega, Perfect World	iOS	Yes	Yes	Yes	
2025	Persona 5: Phantom X	RPG	Atlus, Sega, Perfect World	Android	Yes	Yes	Yes	
2025	Sonic Rumble	Action	Sega, Rovio	iOS	Yes	Yes	Yes	
2025	Sonic Rumble	Action	Sega, Rovio	Android	Yes	Yes	Yes	
2026	Sega Football Club Champions	Sports	Sega	iOS	Yes	Yes	Yes	
2026	Sega Football Club Champions	Sports	Sega	Android	Yes	Yes	Yes	
