= Altered Beast: Guardian of the Realms =

2002 video game

- Developer: 3d6 Games
- Publishers: NA: THQ; EU: Sega
- Series: Altered Beast
- Platform: Game Boy Advance
- Release: NA: November 26, 2002; EU: July 25, 2003
- Genre: Beat 'em up
- Mode: Single-player

Altered Beast: Guardian of the Realms is a 2002 beat 'em up video game developed by 3d6 Games and published by Sega for the Game Boy Advance. It was released by THQ in North America in 2002 and by Sega in Europe in 2003. The game is a handheld sequel to Sega's 1988 arcade video game Altered Beast. The game was the result of a publishing deal between Sega and THQ, with third-party American developer 3d6 creating two Advance titles, also including The Revenge of Shinobi. Upon release, Guardian of the Realms received mixed reviews, with critics praising the game's likeness to the original release, but critiquing the long level design, limitations to the combat, and inconsistent visuals.

== Gameplay ==
A screenshot of Guardian of the Realms.

Playing as a fallen Guardian of the Realms, players are called by Zeus to defend Olympus and defeat the Arcanon. Gameplay involves hack and slash combat across sixteen levels where the objective is to complete the level by defeating monsters and the level boss to reach the end. Players can punch, kick, duck, and jump, and collect and use power-ups that confer temporary effects, including to increase speed, restore health, add shields, or use magic attacks. Each time the player collects a Spirit Orb, the player grows in size and strength, and shifts into a Beast with a unique appearance in each level when three are collected. Beasts, such as dragons, werewolves, or tigers, confer additional attack abilities. The game also supports two multiplayer modes, including a two-player co-operative mode and a four-player battle mode.

== Development ==
Guardian of the Realms was developed by 3d6 Games, a third-party Nevada company. The company developed the game alongside The Revenge of Shinobi following a co-publishing agreement made between Sega and THQ in May 2002. The agreement allowed THQ to publish new Game Boy Advance titles based on previous Sega intellectual property, including Altered Beast and The Revenge of Shinobi. Altered Beast lead designer Maoko Uchida was an advisor during development of the game. A demo was showcased at the THQ booth at E3 in the same month, featuring a single level. Development was completed in October 2002, and the game was released in North America on 26 November 2002. 3d6 studios closed business shortly after release.

== Reception ==
Reception

Aggregate score
Aggregator	Score
Metacritic	63%

Review scores
Publication	Score
AllGame	3.5/5
Electronic Gaming Monthly	60%
G4	4/5
Game Informer	7.5/10
GamePro	3/5
GameSpot	6/10
GameSpy	54%
IGN	7.5/10
Nintendo Power	2.8/5

Guardian of the Realms received "mixed or average" reviews, according to review aggregator Metacritic. Many reviewers reflected on the merits of Guardian of the Realms compared to the original game, with many considering it to bear a close resemblance. Gavin Frankle of GameSpy considered the game to "faithfully adhere" to the controls and design of the original. Allgame considered it to be a "merely passable" homage that "borrows much from the design of its progenitor", but added little else. However, several critics felt the game built on the original, with Brad Kane of G4 stating the game's extra levels, beasts and multiplayer made it a "great game in its own right" and extended its appeal "beyond simple nostalgia".

Critics provided mixed assessments of the gameplay and controls. GameSpy found the limited number of attacks "tiresome" and "disjointed" due to the imprecision of attack timing. Frank Provo of GameSpot similarly viewed that the game's combat was "insipidly simple" due to "sluggish" movement and similar attack patterns across enemies.

Several critics complained about the lengthy level design, and a lack of variation. Allgame felt that the fifteen levels were "far too long" and had "little to differentiate from one another" and had "scant rewards" to incentivise the player. However, Shane Bettenhausen of Electronic Gaming Monthly considered the "extreme length" made the game worthwhile in comparison to the five levels in the original.

The graphics also received a mixed reception. Allgame found the artistic execution was "questionable", finding it "works in some areas, but looks downright horrid in others". Electronic Gaming Monthly singled out the "unabashedly silly" design of some of the beast forms as an example of the "ugly visuals". GameSpot expressed that whilst the game's scenery was "colorful and full of depth", the game suffered from "choppy" animations, inconsistent color schemes and "pasted-on" characters.

=== Retrospective ===
Retrospective reception of Guardian of the Realms has been mixed. Electronic Gaming Monthly described the game as a "janky" and "hideous" update to the Altered Beast series. Kurt Kalata of Hardcore Gaming 101 considered the game was "good" but "too close to its source material", critiquing the "long" levels with "repetitive scenery" and "crappy" sprites.
