= Sega Forever =

Video game service by Sega

- Developer: Sega
- Type: Online service
- Launched: June 22, 2017
- Platforms: Android, iOS
- Status: Defunct
- Website: forever.sega.com

Sega Forever was a service from the Japanese video game developer Sega for re-releasing past games from the company on modern platforms. The service was launched for Android and iOS devices on June 22, 2017. By 2020, the service included over 30 games. In September of 2023, Sega quietly discontinued services by de-listing applications and leaving their social media pages inactive.

== Background ==
Sega Forever was a service by Sega to re-release their previously developed video games on Android and iOS-based platforms. Games included on the service were free to play, although they displayed with advertisements that can be permanently disabled per-game by purchasing them. Game types vary between releases—while some are direct ports, others are emulated versions of the originals. While Sega stated that mobile devices were the initial focus for the service, they also stated it may also expand to other platforms in the future, such as PC and video game consoles. Similar to Nintendo's strategy of using mobile games and apps to attract attention to their console games, Sega hoped to release games to not only to promote their console games, but also to monitor game usage and use it as a metric to determine which franchises to make new games with in the future as well. The end-goal was to eventually create a service similar to Netflix for their games.

== Games ==
The initial wave of games were from Sega's Genesis/Mega Drive console, with the service later adding games from the Dreamcast, Sega CD, and arcade. During the testing phases of the system, Sega Saturn and Dreamcast games did not perform satisfactorily, though Sega had on-going R&D efforts working on improving them in hopes of future release. Games such as Panzer Dragoon had been considered for the service, but could not be successfully emulated in the testing phase, meaning that such a release would hypothetically require a lengthy porting process instead. Sega was also open to releasing games that had not previously had English localizations, such as the Yuji Naka-designed game, Girl's Garden.

Games had new features added, such as leaderboards and cloud saves, and touchscreen controls, though they also have controller support as well. Games were also playable offline without an internet connection. Five games were available at launch, with more games being added over time. In March 2018, Sega announced their intention on releasing native ports, rather than emulated, for the service. Sega also stated that while they would continue to release emulated games, the change to primarily making native ports will result in fewer new games being released overall. At the same time, Sega announced that games on the service had been downloaded more than 40 million times.

=== List ===
† = Native ports as opposed to being emulated

Title	Original platform	Release date	Ref.
Sonic the Hedgehog^{†}	Sega Genesis	June 22, 2017	
Phantasy Star II	Sega Genesis	June 22, 2017	
Comix Zone	Sega Genesis	June 22, 2017	
Kid Chameleon	Sega Genesis	June 22, 2017	
Altered Beast	Sega Genesis	June 22, 2017	
Virtua Tennis Challenge^{†}	Android, iOS	July 12, 2017	
The Revenge of Shinobi	Sega Genesis	July 27, 2017	
Ristar	Sega Genesis	August 10, 2017	
Golden Axe	Sega Genesis	August 31, 2017	
Crazy Taxi^{†}	Dreamcast	September 13, 2017	
Space Harrier II	Sega Genesis	September 13, 2017	
Beyond Oasis	Sega Genesis	October 11, 2017	
Decap Attack	Sega Genesis	October 25, 2017	
ESWAT: City Under Siege	Sega Genesis	November 8, 2017	
Sonic the Hedgehog 2^{†}	Sega Genesis	November 21, 2017	
Streets of Rage	Sega Genesis	December 6, 2017	
Gunstar Heroes	Sega Genesis	December 20, 2017	
Sonic CD^{†}	Sega CD	February 1, 2018	
Dynamite Headdy	Sega Genesis	April 18, 2018	
Super Monkey Ball: Sakura Edition^{†}	Android, iOS	May 17, 2018	
Vectorman	Sega Genesis	June 21, 2018	
Sonic the Hedgehog 4: Episode II^{†}	Android, iOS	August 2, 2018	
Streets of Rage 2	Sega Genesis	September 20, 2018	
Shining in the Darkness	Sega Genesis	October 24, 2018	
Shining Force	Sega Genesis	October 24, 2018	
Shining Force II	Sega Genesis	October 24, 2018	
Golden Axe II	Sega Genesis	January 17, 2019	
Golden Axe III	Sega Genesis	January 17, 2019	
Phantasy Star III	Sega Genesis	February 21, 2019	
Phantasy Star IV	Sega Genesis	February 21, 2019	
After Burner Climax^{†}	Arcade	April 4, 2019	

== Reception ==
Reception at launch was mixed, with critics noting that the service had a number of technical issues, mostly regarding the frame rate. Sega later resolved most of the issues in a July 2017 update. The service was discontinued in September 2023.
