= The Revenge of Shinobi =

The Revenge of Shinobi may refer to:

- The Revenge of Shinobi (1989 video game), a Sega Genesis video game
- The Revenge of Shinobi (2002 video game), a Game Boy Advance video game
