= Golden Axe: The Revenge of Death Adder =

1992 video game

- Developer: Sega AM1
- Publisher: Sega
- Composers: Tomoyuki Kawamura; Masanori Takeuchi
- Series: Golden Axe
- Platform: Arcade
- Release: 1992
- Genre: Beat 'em up
- Modes: Single-player, multiplayer
- Arcade system: Sega System 32

Golden Axe: The Revenge of Death Adder is an arcade game released by Sega in 1992. It is the sequel to the original Golden Axe and features the same hack and slash action as its predecessor with new additions and improvements. Powered by the System 32 arcade board, Revenge of Death Adder features more detailed graphics, adds new selectable characters and doubles the maximum number of simultaneous players from two to four. None of the three characters from the previous game are playable, with players choosing from four new protagonists who battle through various levels to defeat the villainous Death Adder.

While the original Golden Axe saw release on various home platforms, Revenge of Death Adder remained an arcade exclusive. Instead Sega published a completely different game, Golden Axe II, for the Sega Genesis. Revenge of Death Adder was not officially released for the home market until 2020, when it was paired with the first Golden Axe on both the Astro City Mini and Arcade1Up's smaller scale recreation of the original arcade cabinet.

== Gameplay ==
The player characters are Goah the giant, Stern Blade the barbarian, Dora the Kentauride, and Little Trix, a young elf lad who carries a pitchfork. None of the characters from the first game are playable, although Gilius Thunderhead from the first game rides on Goah's back, and can cast magic spells, while Goah does the fighting. The main enemy is once again Death Adder. Multiple players could cooperate to complete a special spinning piledriver style wrestling move on a single enemy. Depending on the cabinet, the game allowed up to two, three or four simultaneous players.

As well as introducing multiple paths to the franchise, the magic aspect is adjusted. Though still found in the classic Golden Axe pots, the magic spells do not increase in power with the number of pots collected but require a set number to work. Cutscenes are now introduced randomly showing a zoomed-in shot of one particular type of enemy face being either incinerated, or petrified by a mist then blown to pieces, respectively if Stern or Goah launches their spell. The Revenge of Death Adder is the only Golden Axe game in which one of the magic attacks is not offensive, as Trix grows apple trees with fruit that replenish health. The players are allowed to choose different pathways at two forks in the road. Depending on the version, the unchosen paths are skipped entirely or have to be passed later in the game.

Several new rideable mounts appear in this game: a praying mantis in both standard and fire-breathing versions, an electricity stunning scorpion and a fire-breathing skeleton-dragon. Dora shapeshifts suddenly to a regular 2-legged human when riding a mount and reverts back to centauress when dismounting. Miniature siege weapons are also introduced: ballista and catapult, which can be fired by the heroes by foot, in a stationary stance, or even be picked up and used while riding a creature; if an enemy uses this type of weapon, the player can destroy the launched projectile in due time. The game uses for the first time numerous scaling sequences not present in the 1st arcade opus but now feasible due to the System 32's capabilities, notably levels where the heroes must avoid tumbling rock boulders rolling towards the screen or when wooden and stone objects are destroyed (statues, doors, treasure chests, living tree-men...).

== Reception ==
Reception

Awards
| Publication | Award |
|---|---|
| Gamest (1993) | Best Action Award 9th, Best Production Award 10th, Annual Hit Game 21th |
| Micom BASIC Magazine (1993) | Best Action 10th |

In Japan, Game Machine listed Golden Axe: The Revenge of Death Adder on their November 15, 1992 issue as being the third most-successful table arcade unit of the month.

In 2023, Time Extension included the game on their top 25 "Best Beat 'Em Ups of All Time" list. They called it the best game in the series.
