= Tetris Evolution =

2007 video game

- Developer: Mass Media
- Publisher: THQ
- Series: Tetris
- Platform: Xbox 360
- Release: NA: March 19, 2007; EU: April 27, 2007; AU: May 24, 2007
- Genre: Puzzle
- Modes: Single-player, multiplayer

Tetris Evolution is a video game based on Tetris. It was released in 2007 by THQ for the Xbox 360. It was THQ's fourth and last Tetris game after Tetris Worlds, Tetris Advance and Tetris Elements.

It has a rating of 52/100 at Metacritic. Many criticised it for its lack of innovation, limited game modes and high price. GameSpot gave the game a 6.6/10 saying "The single-player and multiplayer options are solid yet predictable, and the game's got all the personality of a screensaver. If 22 years of Tetris have left you tired of the formula, Tetris Evolution will do very little to reignite your passion for this classic Russian mind-bender.
