= Golden Axe III =

1993 video game

- Developer: Sega
- Publisher: Sega
- Designers: Kazuma Fujii; Takashi Iizuka
- Composers: Naofumi Hataya; Tatsuyuki Maeda; Haruyo Oguro
- Series: Golden Axe
- Platform: Sega Genesis
- Release: JP: June 25, 1993; NA: 1995
- Genre: Beat 'em up
- Modes: Single-player, multiplayer

Golden Axe III (Note: ゴールデンアックスIII, Gooruden Akkusu Surī) is a 1993 beat 'em up game developed and published by Sega for the Sega Genesis. Originally exclusive to Japan, it was made available in North America via the Sega Channel online service in 1995. In this sequel to Golden Axe II, the player controls one of four warriors as they attempt to defeat the evil Damud Hellstrike, who has stolen the Golden Axe and kidnapped the princess of Yuria. Much like its predecessors, the game is based around side-scrolling levels where the player defeats enemies with their melee weapon or fists, while riding creatures known as Bizarrians, or through elemental magic. Several new offensive and defensive moves, like blocking and projectile attacks, can also be used.

Golden Axe III received mixed reception from critics. The game was re-released as part of the Sega Genesis Collection for PlayStation 2 and PlayStation Portable, Sonic's Ultimate Genesis Collection for Xbox 360 and PlayStation 3, digitally on the Wii Virtual Console, and in the Sega Genesis Classics compilation.

== Plot ==
Damud Hellstrike, the Prince of Darkness, has taken away the Golden Axe, kidnapped the princess of Yuria, transformed the king into a humanoid Griffin minion named Eve, and put an evil curse over all of the warriors. However, one of the heroes has their curse relieved by the dwarf, Gillius Thunderhead, from the original game, and is sent to set everything straight by lifting the curse off the others, defeating the villain and returning with the Golden Axe.

== Gameplay ==
Chronos (jumping) fighting a boss (Eve)

The gameplay has been expanded slightly, but is essentially the same style as the previous games. New features include extra fighters, additional moves (special attacks, teamwork attacks and teamwork magic spells) and junction points where the player can choose which path to take.

The five characters include a giant, Proud Cragger, a humanoid black panther, Chronos "Evil" Rait, along with a swordsman, Kain Grinder, who resembles Ax Battler, and a swordswoman, Sarah Burn, who resembles Tyris Flare. Gilius Thunderhead is the only character who makes an appearance from previous games, although he is not playable and simply shows up during cutscenes. Kain Grinder and Sarah Burn are referred to as Ax Battler and Tyris Flare respectively in the Sega Channel localization of the game.

Golden Axe III has many new moves, including blocking, sweep attacks, projectile attacks, defensive and offensive special attacks, and an updated grappling system. Furthermore, there are several abilities unique to certain characters: Proud possesses an airslam throw that does severe damage, while Chronos and Sarah can double jump and wall jump. In Cooperative multiplayer mode, the characters can perform team attacks similar to a human slingshot. Finally, each character has a super move that sends a projectile across the screen (except in the case of Chronos who leaps across the screen in an unstoppable lunging attack).

Some features that were removed in the second game were brought back in Golden Axe III. The mischievous gnomes from the original game that carried magic potions and food have returned in place of the enemy mages from the second game. Extra lives can be earned by freeing a certain number of prisoners scattered throughout the levels. Some prisoners are trapped in barrels or stuck in crystal cells while others are guarded by an enemy that must be slain in order to free them. The magic system returned to the original version from Golden Axe, with characters using all collected magic potions every time, rather than allowing the player to choose how much magic to use by charging the magic meter like in Golden Axe II. The characters can use devastating new spells with combined casting. Each character does the same maximum magic damage.

The mounts in Golden Axe III have turned into a hybrid snail-ostrich, instead of the chicken-leg or the dragon-raptors in the previous games. The mounts are known as Bizarrians. There are four types of Bizarrians in Golden Axe III. The firewave Bizarrian is a Red Dragon that fires a fast moving wave of flame across the screen. The purple Snail uses its tongue to attack, the green Snail is a more powerful version with a longer tongue, and the Green Dragon bites and throws enemies over its shoulder.

The game also features a VS mode where two players can choose between all the regular playable boss characters, as well as the Boss character, Eve, and battle other characters one on one. This mode can also be played in single player against AI opponents. In the regular mode, players are able to choose their own route to the Golden Axe. If the player defeats the last boss and they have a high enough score, they may achieve the good ending and fight Damud Hellstrike's second form.

== Reception ==
Reception

Review scores
Publication	Score
Beep! MegaDrive	5/10
Computer and Video Games	62/100
Famitsu	8/10, 5/10, 6/10, 7/10
HobbyConsolas	86/100
Joystick	70%
Video Games (DE)	79%
Consolemania	92/100
Dengeki Mega Drive	49/100, 55/100, 55/100, 50/100
Game Power	81/100
Hippon Super!	6/10
Mega	79%
MegaTech	55/100
MegaZone	79/100
Sega Power	34%
Sega Pro	57%
Sega Zone	6/100
TodoSega	88/100

Golden Axe III received a 20.3/30 score in a poll conducted by Mega Drive Fan and a 6.1387/10 score in a 1995 readers' poll conducted by the Japanese Sega Saturn Magazine, ranking among Sega Mega Drive titles at the number 384 spot. The game was met with mixed reception from critics. In a feature on the game, Electronic Gaming Monthly commented, "Sega of Japan is not going to release this title here in the States – and for good reasons! The graphics are by far some of the most plain looking on the Mega Drive. Plus, the new magic effects aren't as impressive as before. So, if you are considering purchasing this title from an overseas seller, don't waste your bucks!"

IGN gave the Virtual Console release a 5 out of 10, saying "Legend has it that SEGA thought the quality of the product was so low, that it would be worthless or, worse, damaging to even publish the game in the States. And whether or not that's actually true, the quality assessment at its heart is on target – because Golden Axe III is certainly the worst of its franchise trilogy." Like Electronic Gaming Monthly, they described the graphics as bland and ugly, and said that the gameplay showed no advancement from the first Golden Axe, even removing some of the advancements seen in Golden Axe II.
