= Altered Beast (2005 video game) =

Beat 'em up video game

- Developers: Sega (Sega WOW Div); Sega Shanghai
- Publisher: Sega
- Directors: Shinichiro Okumoto; Makoto Sugawara; Takashi Oda
- Producer: Rieko Kodama
- Designers: Chen Jian; Zhu Enhua; Arata Jumonji
- Programmer: Tomoaki Takayanagi
- Composers: Makito Nomiya; Eriko Sakurai; Susumu Tsukagoshi
- Platform: PlayStation 2
- Release: JP: January 27, 2005; EU: February 25, 2005
- Genre: Beat 'em up
- Mode: Single player

Altered Beast (Note: Released as Jūōki: Project Altered Beast (獣王記 Project Altered Beast) in Japan.) is a 2005 beat 'em up video game developed and published by Sega for the PlayStation 2. The game is a reboot of the 1988 arcade game Altered Beast. While the gameplay still involves the main character transforming into different kinds of beasts like in the original, the story, characters and setting are completely different, along with notable gameplay additions. The game was released in Europe and Japan in 2005, but was cancelled for North America.

Unlike the original Altered Beast which is set in the Greco-Roman world of Ancient Greece, the game features a modern setting unconnected to the previous installments. Altered Beast follows a man called Luke Custer who is a "Genome-Cyborg", a human whose DNA and other genetic make-up has been artificially altered by micro-chips containing the genetic make-up of other creatures to transform him into an anthropomorphic beast. After surviving a helicopter crash, Luke loses his memory and sets off to learn about the truth behind his past and the Genome-Cyborgs.

== Gameplay ==
Screenshot of gameplay in Luke's werewolf form

The player controls Luke Custer in a third-person perspective as they battle through multiple enemies in close combat to reach the next objective, utilizing the ability to transform into different beasts, each with somewhat of their own element, for a certain amount of time. Unlike the original game, the player can transform in and out of their beast form at will when available. Initially from the start Luke can transform into a werewolf. Further into the game, he finds more Genome-Cyborg DNA chips allowing him to change into even more different kinds of beasts including a Merman, a Garuda, a Wendigo, a Minotaur and a Dragon. While each beast has their own different sets of attacks, they also have abilities that are essential for overcoming obstacles, puzzles and boss fights that hinder progression.

Upon finishing the game, a number of other modes are unlocked including time trial boss fights and a challenge mode that can also unlock further beast forms including a White Weretiger, a Grizzly bear and an alien-clone U.W.H. (Unidentified Weightless Human).

== Plot ==
A Special Forces helicopter carrying a mysterious sarcophagus-like box labeled "United States Gene Research" approaches Foret Town, a city that has been covered in a mutagenic mist and turned into a quarantine zone. Suddenly, a monster resembling a griffin takes down the helicopter. In the wreckage, from the sarcophagus emerges a man with no memories, Luke Custer, who finds an information file about "Project Altered Beast" before being attacked by mutants. Luke's self-preservation instinct triggers, transforming him into a huge werewolf who kills the monsters before collapsing. A woman approaches, explaining that the transformation causes huge physical and mental stress, and injecting Luke with tranquilizer to revert him to human form. However, Luke is unable to remember who she is due to amnesia, much to her surprise. She gives him short lectures about the effect of his transformation before leaving Luke.

After Luke explores the area and takes micro-chips from mutated monsters, he starts remembering that as a part of USGR's Project Altered Beast, he became a "Genome-Cyborg", a human whose DNA and other genetic make-up has been artificially altered by "Genome-Chips" that allow him to add the genetic make-up of other creatures to transform him into an anthropomorphic beast. Eventually in an USGR facility Luke meets the woman again, who introduces herself as Anastasia, former assistant to Project Altered Beast's head scientist, Dr. Eric Jobs, and explains that the Project was funded by the U.S. Army and before creating Luke had another test subject, Brad, who released the Genome Mist in the city and is seeking the most powerful Genome-Chip.

Luke eventually meets Brad in the research facility that houses the Dragon Genome-Chip, and fights him after Brad turns into a Weretiger. Upon defeat, Brad says it was not him who released the Genome Mist and that Anastasia is the one who needs to be stopped before running off. After using the Dragon chip, Luke recalls Anastasia herself was also a Genome-Cyborg. Deeper within the facility, Luke finds Anastasia next to a mutated Dr. Jobs, and she explains that Brad was the first test subject to successfully transform, and afterwards she was part of tests aiming to create a "Chimera"-type Genome-Cyborg that could combine the genomes of multiple beasts, but her flaws and instability made Dr. Jobs try again with Luke, who was successful and became a field agent. Growing jealous and vengeful of Luke, Anastasia released the Genome Mist knowing the government would send Luke back into the facility to solve the problem, granting her a chance at revenge as she hopes absorbing Luke she would fix all her flaws. She then absorbs Dr. Jobs before mutating into a monstrous form that subdues Luke before Brad attacks Anastasia, saving Luke but getting himself killed in the process. Luke then fights an increasingly more mutating Anastasia, ultimately killing her. Feeling sympathetic towards both fallen Genome-Cyborgs, Luke carries Brad's body to lie next to Anastasia's remains, and escapes as the facility begins to burn down and fall apart.

== Reception ==
Reception

Aggregate score
Aggregator	Score
GameRankings	50%

Review scores
Publication	Score
Eurogamer	4/10
GamesMaster	59%
Play	6/10
PSM3	42%
VideoGamer.com	5/10

The game received mixed reviews with an average critic score of 53/100 at Metacritic. VideoGamer said "The name will probably attract a number of fans of the original game, and they may get the most out of what is an average title. For those who do not base their purchases on nostalgia, look elsewhere." ScrewAttack named Altered Beast as the 10th worst game on their Top 10 Worst 2D to 3D games.
