= Tetris Worlds =

2001 video game

- Windows box art by Roger Dean
- Developers: Blue Planet Software (PS2, Windows); 3d6 Games (GBA); Radical Entertainment (GC, Xbox)
- Publisher: THQ
- Series: Tetris
- Platforms: Game Boy Advance; Windows; PlayStation 2; GameCube; Xbox
- Release: September 24, 2001: Game Boy Advance; NA: September 24, 2001; PAL: December 7, 2001 Windows; NA: November 8, 2001; PAL: April 5, 2002 PlayStation 2; NA: March 19, 2002; PAL: July 26, 2002 GameCube; NA: June 26, 2002; PAL: September 27, 2002 Xbox; NA: June 26, 2002; PAL: September 20, 2002
- Genre: Puzzle
- Modes: Single-player, multiplayer

Tetris Worlds is a puzzle video game published by THQ based on Tetris (1985) by Alexey Pajitnov. Originally released in 2001 for Microsoft Windows and Game Boy Advance, it was later released for Xbox, GameCube, and PlayStation 2 in 2002. In 2003, an Xbox Live version titled Tetris Worlds Online and a single-disc compilation version (bundled alongside Star Wars: The Clone Wars) were released for the Xbox. The latter was bundled with Xbox systems.

== Gameplay ==
Gameplay consists of normal Tetris games. However, there are several game modes, tweaking the way the game works.

=== Story mode ===
The goal is to evacuate the homeworld of the Minos before their solar system's sun Hadar goes supernova.

The player can send their Mino Tetrinaut to six different worlds, then play the Tetris variant of that world. When the player plays enough of that world, more Minos are rescued. The better the player does, the more Minos rescued. They will then work to create the world into a home for Minos.

=== Arcade mode ===
A four-player game of Tetris Worlds

This mode is where the player plays two-minute Tetris games of any variant. This is also where multiplayer games are played. The Arcade mode variants are listed as follows:

- Tetris: "Go for a Tetris". A normal Tetris game, where the player plays until they lose. Losses occur when the Tetriminos reach the top.
- Square Tetris: While the player plays Tetris, they must also try to combine Tetriminos into squares. Lines cleared containing 4x4 Tetriminos cause large bonuses. This variant originated from The New Tetris.
- Cascade Tetris: "Go for a Cascade". The player must try to clear lines that cause Cascades. Cascades occur when a cleared line cause other Blocks to fall and clear another line.
- Sticky Tetris: "Clear the Bottom Line". Players must try to clear the bottom line of "Garbage Blocks". Same-colored Blocks stick together in this mode, hence the name. If 25 same-colored blocks connect, a Critical Mass is formed and are cleared from the Matrix. This variant originated from "The Next Tetris".
- Hot-Line Tetris: "Go for a Hot-Line". In this mode, there are six "Hot-Lines" in the Matrix. The player must try to clear lines that are on the Hot-Line. Lines cleared anywhere else earn no points.
- Fusion Tetris: "Activate the Atom Blocks". In this mode, there is a "Fusion Block" at the bottom of the Matrix. Players must try to connect falling "Atom Blocks" to the Fusion Blocks. Atom and Fusion Blocks are not cleared in line clears, and clearing a line containing an Atom or Fusion Block causes a Cascade.
- Popular Tetris (GBA Version Only): In this hidden mode the game is set up like the original Tetris game. The player clears lines to score points and after every 10 lines the level goes up. Scoring increases on higher levels and there is no time limit; however, this mode stops keeping score once a player reaches 1 million (which is more than 999999, the maximum score on the Game Boy version).

== Development ==
The game had a marketing budget of $2 million.

The platform-specific versions of Tetris Worlds were developed by three different companies. Blue Planet Software developed the PC and PlayStation 2 versions, Radical Entertainment developed the GameCube and Xbox versions, and 3d6 Games developed the Game Boy Advance version. All versions were published by THQ under license from The Tetris Company.

Tetris Worlds was THQ's first Tetris game. THQ later published Tetris Advance also for the Game Boy Advance, Tetris Elements for Windows and Mac OS X, and Tetris Evolution for the Xbox 360. Every version except for Game Boy Advance features a distinctly whispering female voice (Kimberly Unger, credited as eKim) as the announcer. The game has been translated into French, German, Italian, Spanish, and Japanese.

== Reception ==
Reception

Aggregate scores
Aggregator	Score				
Aggregator	GBA	GameCube	PC	PS2	Xbox
GameRankings	65%	54%	64%	58%	59%
Metacritic	65/100	47/100	N/A	44/100	53/100

Review scores
Publication	Score				
Publication	GBA	GameCube	PC	PS2	Xbox
AllGame	N/A	N/A	3.5/5	2.5/5	N/A
Electronic Gaming Monthly	N/A	4.5/10	N/A	N/A	N/A
Eurogamer	N/A	N/A	N/A	N/A	4/10
Famitsu	22/40	N/A	N/A	N/A	24/40
Game Informer	7/10	N/A	N/A	N/A	N/A
GameSpot	2.1/10	5.1/10	3.5/10	3.1/10	5.2/10
GameSpy	67%	N/A	N/A	N/A	N/A
GameZone	8.4/10	6/10	N/A	N/A	7/10
IGN	5.5/10	4.6/10	5.7/10	3.8/10	4.6/10
Nintendo Power	3/5	3.4/5	N/A	N/A	N/A
Official U.S. PlayStation Magazine	N/A	N/A	N/A	2/5	N/A
Official Xbox Magazine (US)	N/A	N/A	N/A	N/A	6.8/10

The Game Boy Advance and Xbox versions received "mixed" reviews, while the GameCube and PlayStation 2 versions received "generally unfavorable reviews", according to the review aggregation website Metacritic. In Japan, where the GBA version was ported and published by Success on April 26, 2002, followed by the Xbox version on November 14, and the GameCube version on December 20, Famitsu gave it a score of one six, one four, and two sixes for a total of 22 out of 40 for the GBA version, and 24 out of 40 for the Xbox version. Tetris Worlds' Game Boy Advance version was a runner-up for GameSpot's annual "Worst Game" award among console games, which went to Kabuki Warriors.

In the PS2, PC, and GBA versions, gameplay contained one major difference from a normal Tetris game. In classic Tetris, when a Tetrimino touches the bottom of the screen, it locks in place. However, in these versions, Tetriminos do not lock until players make them lock (e.g., by using Hard Drop to lock them immediately), allowing players to rotate and move the pieces indefinitely until they are satisfied. Critics said that this made the game too easy (although the countdown clock still runs while the player is using unlimited move and rotate) and GameSpot said that it "broke Tetris". In the GameCube and Xbox versions, the "Easy Spin" feature was made optional. However, they still received mostly mixed reviews.

=== Sales ===
In the United States, Tetris Worlds' Game Boy Advance version sold 960,000 copies and earned $26 million by August 2006. During the period between January 2000 and August 2006, it was the 20th highest-selling game launched for the Game Boy Advance, Nintendo DS or PlayStation Portable in that country.

By July 2006, the PlayStation 2 version of Tetris Worlds had sold 850,000 copies and earned $18 million in the United States. Next Generation ranked it as the 71st highest-selling game launched for the PlayStation 2, Xbox or GameCube between January 2000 and July 2006 in that country.
