= Ristar =

1995 video game

- North American box art
- Developer: Sega
- Publisher: Sega
- Director: Atsuhiko Nakamura
- Producers: Hiroshi Aso; Makoto Oshitani; Yoji Ishii; Minoru Kanari
- Designers: Akira Nishino; Takeshi Niimura
- Artist: Yuji Uekawa
- Composer: Tomoko Sasaki
- Platform: Sega Genesis
- Release: NA: February 1995; EU/JP: February 17, 1995
- Genre: Platform
- Mode: Single-player

Ristar (Note: Released in Japan as Ristar the Shooting Star (リスター・ザ・シューティングスター, Risutā za Shūtingu Sutā).) is a 1995 platform game developed and published by Sega for the Sega Genesis. The game stars an anthropomorphic cartoon star who uses his hands and long, stretchable arms to both move and fight enemies. Reception for the game was generally positive, but the game's initial release was overshadowed due to the imminent ending of the Genesis's lifecycle and the succession of the Sega Saturn and other fifth generation video game consoles.

While never receiving any sequels, Sega has re-released Ristar several times digitally and on Sega-themed compilations, including the Sega Forever line of releases for mobile devices. The character has additionally received various cameos in other Sega properties as well. A Game Gear version of Ristar featured different level design and gameplay mechanics.

== Gameplay ==
Screenshot showing the playable character Ristar traversing Planet Neer/Flora, the first level in the game

Ristar is a 2D sidescrolling platform game, similar to games in the Super Mario or Sonic the Hedgehog series of video games, but focusing less on jumping and speed, and more on the use of Ristar's stretchable arms, which can reach in 8 different main directions. The player must maneuver Ristar through the level to its end, while avoiding damage from obstacles and enemies. Ristar's extendable arms are used as the main means of attacking enemies; through extending his arms, grabbing the enemy, and pulling himself towards them into a "headbutt" motion to defeat them. The same motion also allows for opening treasure chests containing various items, or striking different parts of the environment, such as knocking trees over. Additionally, his elastic arms can merely be used for grabbing and/or throwing objects as well.

Beyond attacking, Ristar's arms are also used as a method of projecting him through levels. Many pole-like structures are present to swing Ristar from one side to another, across gaps or to ascend or descend platforms vertically. Ristar is also able to grab on to enemies and objects in mid-air and swing on them. Additionally, "Star Handles" are placed in levels, where the player must have Ristar grab and use momentum to swing him around in a 360 degrees circle. Letting go launches him off in a given direction, dependent on the time of release. If enough momentum is gained, sparkles appear behind Ristar and he performs a move called the "Meteor Strike", which makes him invincible and able to defeat any enemy upon touching them. When enough momentum is lost, usually a few seconds, flight ceases, and he drops to the ground back into his normal state, though this can be extended by bouncing off walls and ceilings during flight.

Every level ends with a special "Star Handle", which is used to launch Ristar through the end of the level. Bonus points are awarded based on Ristar's altitude when flying offscreen, similar to how levels are ended in Super Mario Bros. Additionally, every level also contains one hidden handle that sends Ristar to a bonus stage, which involve getting through an obstacle course within a given time limit. Completing the level in a particularly fast time will earn a continue, and after the game is completed, special codes are awarded depending on how many were completed. Ristar's health is shown through an icon based health system consisting of four stars in the upper-right corner of the screen. Taking damage removes one star, and losing all stars causes Ristar to lose a life. Locating and grabbing a Ristar figure grants Ristar an extra life, while finding traditional star figures replenish his health; a yellow star replenishes one star, while a blue star restores all four.

== Plot ==
Much like other games from the same timeframe, the game's story varied between the Japanese-language release and its English-language counterpart. In all versions of the game, the events take place in a far-off galaxy, where an evil space pirate, Kaiser Greedy, has used mind control to make the planets' leaders obey him. In the Japanese version, the inhabitants of Planet Neer (Flora in the international version) pray for a hero before Greedy's mind control minion, Riho, snatches the planet elder. The desperate prayers reach the mother of shooting stars, Oruto. She awakens one of her children, Ristar, with the sole purpose of granting the wishes of the innocent people. He must stop Greedy and the brainwashed leaders of each world to restore peace to the Valdi System.

In the international version, Oruto is omitted altogether. Instead, Ristar has a father, the legendary hero, who is a shooting star that protects the constellation of Valjee. Rather than Oruto awakening Ristar, the legendary hero was kidnapped by Greedy, and it is up to Ristar to rescue his father as well. The Japanese version of the game ends with Greedy and two of his underlings, Inonis and Uranim, stranded on a deserted planet, with a picture of Ristar appearing in the space, while Greedy simply stares at it. The ending scene in the international version shows Ristar being reunited with his father once again.

== Development ==
In the early 1990s, Sega asked its development teams to create a mascot to rival Nintendo's Mario. One proposed character had long rabbit-like ears which could extend and pick up objects, but this was discarded as too complex; the team moved on to animals that could roll into a ball, and settled on Sonic the Hedgehog. Some years later, Sega developed another prototype, Feel, with a character that used its arms to pick things up instead of ears, which became Ristar.

In a 1994 Electronic Gaming Monthly interview, Sega marketing staff Lisa Best and Terry Tang claimed Ristar was not designed by the same Sonic programming team, although much of the game's staff would later go on to create Nights into Dreams for the Saturn, the next game to be officially credited to Sonic Team. This, along with Ristar's inclusion in a number of Sonic-themed compilations and re-releases in subsequent years, would lead game journalists to retroactively label the game as being developed by Sonic Team.

=== Localization ===
A number of small changes were made in localizing the version released for English-speaking countries. The story was altered slightly; in the Japanese version, a star mother, Oruto, summons Ristar's help, where in the international version, Oruto is omitted completely, and Ristar's father, a "legendary hero", is referenced instead.

The boss of the ice-themed level, Itamor, was changed from a large cat robot to an ice monster-type robot. In the game, Ristar must grab hot dishes of food, and throw it in Itamor's mouth. In Japan, it was considered clever to use "hot food" to defeat a cat, due to a Japanese cultural reference regarding a "cat-tongue" not liking hot food. In English-speaking regions, that reference is non-existent, so it was changed to a "cold ice monster" being defeated by being melted by "hot food".

The rest of the changes were very minor edits in effort to appeal to western audiences, such as minor graphical changes to make Ristar and other character's faces look more serious, renaming levels to names more descriptive of their looks, and adding a few non-interactive scenes to show more continuity in the game, such as a skiing sequence before the snow-themed level, or putting on anti-gravity shoes to explain why Ristar is floating in a particular level.

== Reception ==
Reception

Aggregate score
Aggregator	Score
GameRankings	89.33%

Review scores
Publication	Score
Computer and Video Games	83/100
Electronic Gaming Monthly	8/10, 7/10, 8/10, 7/10, 8/10
Famitsu	7/10, 7/10, 7/10, 8/10
Game Informer	8.25/10
Game Players	79%
GameFan	90/100, 98/100, 92/100
GamesMaster	57%
Mean Machines Sega	84/100
Next Generation	3/5
Entertainment Weekly	B−
Electronic Games	A
Games World	83/100
Mega	82%
Sega Magazine	87/100
Sega Power	74%
Sega Pro	90%
Sega Saturn Magazine (JP)	7.5/10
VideoGames	8/10

Ristar received a 20.8/30 score in a poll conducted by Mega Drive Fan and a 8.3076/10 score in a 1995 readers' poll conducted by the Japanese Sega Saturn Magazine, ranking among Sega Mega Drive titles at the number 63 spot. The game received generally favorable reception from critics, holding a rating of 89.33% based on six reviews according to review aggregator GameRankings.

Sega Magazine gave the game an 87% rating, praising the gameplay, graphics, and music, but complaining that the game lacked some originality and borrowed a lot from other platforming games at the time, such as Sonic the Hedgehog, Dynamite Headdy, and Earthworm Jim. Sega Pro praised it for both its similarities and differences from the Sonic the Hedgehog series, stating "if you judged games purely by their visual looks, then you'd be forgiven for thinking that this WAS Sonic the Hedgehog. But when you actually sit back and start playing it, you'll discover that this is a much slower, strategic game. There is a big puzzle element here, which should make it stand out from the hundreds of other platformers in the market". Sega Power made a number of similar points, comparing the gameplay to a mix "between Sonic and Dynamite Headdy", but criticized its short length and lack of originality, and only gave it a 74 rating: "...if you like Sonic games, you will like this" but that "...it's not as good as Sonic either". GamePro likewise remarked that Ristar feels "sluggish" in comparison to Sonic, and criticized that Ristar has few animations compared to other platformer stars and that the game's low difficulty makes it suitable only for beginning gamers. Despite this, they gave the game an overall recommendation based on the colorful visuals and cleverly designed gameplay. In Electronic Gaming Monthly, Mike Weigand summarizing: "An excellent new character, Ristar requires more technique than the typical run-and-jump action titles". (Note: The review lists the game's platform as the Game Gear, but this is an error. Electronic Gaming Monthly published a review for the Game Gear version of Ristar in their following issue.) A reviewer for Next Generation, while noting that Ristar borrowed heavily from Dynamite Headdy, contended that the player character has more than enough originality and versatility to go beyond being a mere clone. Citing the excellent stage design, "slick transparencies, original bosses, and great music", he deemed it "one of the best platform games to date". Despite this, he gave it only three out of five stars. Entertainment Weekly was less positive in their review, giving it a B− review score due to the perceived redundancy and recycling of ideas from the Sonic series.

Ristar received considerably more positive reviews over a decade later upon being re-released digitally and as part of Sonic and Sega themed game compilations. IGN gave the Virtual Console version an eight out of ten, praising the game's graphics, music and gameplay, and closed with saying "platformer fans would do well to give this one a look". GameSpot praised the Virtual Console release as well, especially its graphics, stating: "Visually, the developers made the best of the system's limited color palette and employed every graphical trick they could to make the game look snazzy. Ristar and his enemies have a good variety of animations, but what you'll probably notice the most are the colorful, multilayered backgrounds that constantly flaunt animated details in the form of moving clouds, falling debris, and rampaging creatures that have a habit of hurling things at you from a distance". Nintendo Life scored it at 9/10 and referred to the game as one of the best of the system in regards to graphics, animation, and gameplay, writing: "Ristar proves that taking a radical approach to play control in a platformer can sometimes really pay off in the end. Not only did Sonic Team create a game that easily differentiates itself from their Sonic the Hedgehog series, they've also come up with some of the most unique game play ideas to come out of the 16-bit era and a game that's every bit as much fun to play today as it was almost 15 years ago when it was first released". 1UP.com referred to the game as "excellent" and referred to it as the "most entertaining" of the four non-Sonic games in Sonic Mega Collection. AllGame echoed the sentiment, referring to it as "being as good if not better than any of the included Sonic games in Sonic Mega Collection and as "an overlooked gem" as part of Sega Genesis Collection".

In a retrospective piece by Levi Buchanan of IGN, he praised the graphics and gameplay as being great for the aging Sega Genesis, but also asserted that the platform hurt the game's ability to succeed with sales and visibility: "Ristar never stood a chance. The game was released in early 1995, just as the videogame world was moving on to the next generation of hardware. Sega was concentrating on the impending release of the Saturn and Sonic was still a monster success. And so Ristar was put to pasture". In 2017, GamesRadar ranked Ristar 41st on their "Best Sega Genesis/Mega Drive games of all time."

== Legacy ==
In a 2006 interview, Ristar designer Akira Nishino said:

Will Ristar come back? Probably not. Of course, as a game developer, I would love to see it happen. At the time of the original, I was thinking of a sequel. It got as far as a character design for that sequel, but it didn't happen for various reasons. But since fans have a say in such matters, your input is greatly appreciated.

While Ristar has never received any sequels, it has received further attention in later years through re-releases in several Sonic and Sega-themed compilations, including Sonic Mega Collection, Sega Genesis Collection, Sonic's Ultimate Genesis Collection and Sega Forever. It has also been released for digital download for the Virtual Console and Steam. In 2021, it was released on the Nintendo Classics service. The game was also included on the North American and European edition of the Sega Genesis Mini 2, released on October 27, 2022.

Ristar, as a character, has only made a few minor cameo appearances outside of his two original games in 1995. In Sega's two Shenmue games for the Dreamcast, Shenmue and Shenmue II, the player can choose to spend money to purchase a randomly selected collectible 'Gachapons' (capsule toys) from a machine; one of the possibilities in both games is a Ristar figurine. He also briefly appeared in the introductory video of the 2001 Japan-only Dreamcast game Segagaga. Ristar did not make any more appearances until 2010, where he makes a cameo appearance in a downloadable track for Sonic & Sega All-Stars Racing due to the high demand for him to be in the game. He also made an appearance as a flagman in the sequel, Sonic & All-Stars Racing Transformed, in 2012. In 2012, Ristar was cited by GameSpot as one of the examples of lost video games from the 1990s that deserved to return.
