= Ristar (Game Gear video game) =

1995 video game

- North America cover art
- Developer: Japan System House
- Publisher: Sega
- Platform: Game Gear
- Release: NA: February 16, 1995; JP: February 17, 1995; EU: February 18, 1995; AU: February 19, 1995
- Genre: Platform
- Mode: Single-player

Ristar (Note: Released in Japan as Ristar the Shooting Star (リスター・ザ・シューティングスター, Risutā za Shūtingu Sutā).) is a platform video game released by Sega in February 1995 for the Game Gear. While sharing themes and gameplay elements from its main counterpart, Ristar, for the Sega Genesis, it is a largely different game. Like in the Genesis version, the player assumes the role of an anthropomorphic cartoon star who uses his stretchable arms to fight enemies and navigate levels. The Game Gear version was developed by Japan System House, a developer commonly utilized to make Game Gear iterations of their Sega Genesis games.

The game was well received by critics, who felt the gameplay mechanics were transferred over well to the older, aging Game Gear system, but were divided on whether or not the game was worth playing if both versions of the game were available to the consumer. The game received even less exposure than its Genesis counterpart, due to the Game Gear being towards the end of its lifecycle, and having less of a userbase to begin with in comparison to the Genesis.

== Gameplay ==
The basic premise for the gameplay of the Game Gear version of Ristar is largely the same as the Sega Genesis counterpart. The game plays as a two-dimensional sidescrolling platformer where the player must navigate Ristar through a level, maneuvering around enemies and obstacles. Also like the Genesis version, Ristar's main abilities include emphasizing grabbing and "headbutting" enemies over jumping.

However, despite the same premise, the actual level design is distinctly different. While half of the levels having the same themes such as the opening level having a fauna-themed environment, the actual layouts are remixed and the enemy type and placement is different. Additionally, the other half of the levels have entirely different themes not present in the Genesis game at all, such as one based around Pirate ships. Another major variation present in all of levels is the placement of little stars scattered throughout. The player directs Ristar to move through them to collect them, similar to the manner in which Sonic the Hedgehog collects rings, or Mario collects coins in their respective games. Similarly, collecting 100 earns Ristar another life. While boss battles are still present at the end of every planet, most battles themselves are different, and almost all planets no longer possess any sort of mini-bosses halfway through the planet.

More moves, items, and interactivity between characters and the environment are also possible in the Game Gear game. Upon defeating an enemy, the player can choose to have Ristar use an enemy's hat as a weapon, or use its leftover spear as a stepping point when plunged into a wall, allowing Ristar to reach previously out-of-reach higher areas. A "red star" item gives Ristar temporary invincibility, speeds up his movement, increases his jump speed, and allows him to damage enemy upon contact. Colored square boxes, similar to the coin boxes in the Super Mario series, are also only present in this version, and like with enemies, they are eliminated by using the "headbutt" attack rather than by jumping into them.

== Development ==
Ristar's origins trace back to a scrapped idea by Yuji Naka of Sonic Team involving a rabbit which grabbed objects. While it was scrapped in favor of pursuing what would be Sonic the Hedgehog, years later the concept re-emerged as a prototype called Feel, which eventually morphed into Ristar. The Game Gear game was developed by a different team from the Sega Genesis game – being developed by Japan System House (later Biox), a developer Sega commonly used at the time to make Game Gear iterations of their Sega Genesis games, such as Streets of Rage. For the game's North American release, an entire level was cut out of the game. While every planet has two levels in the Japanese release, the game's second planet, "Fanturn", only has one level in the North American release; the second level was cut out of the game.

== Reception ==
Reception

Review scores
Publication	Score
Electronic Gaming Monthly	7.5/10
Famitsu	25/40
Game Informer	8/10

Ristar for the Game Gear was largely well received, albeit slightly less so than its Sega Genesis counterpart. While most reviewers agreed the game was worth playing, they were split on whether or not it was worth playing if the Genesis alternative was also available to the consumer. Similar to the Genesis version, reviewers praised the player character's abilities and the colorful graphics of the game. The four reviewers of Electronic Gaming Monthly gave the game a 7.5 out of 10 average. Two of the reviewers criticized the audio, but all four described the game as having impressively colorful graphics and more deep technique than most platform games on the Game Gear. GamePro called Ristar "surprisingly excellent", citing precise and easy-to-learn controls, cleverly designed and colorful graphics, and strong replay value. Game Informer praised the title as one of the best Game Gear games, noting that it was "Different from the Sega [Genesis] version, and in some ways better" and concluded that "Sega did a great job in this transition to the Game Gear. The [game]play is almost as good as its big screen counterpart. Ristar is the next best thing to Sonic, and a welcome change of pace." In contrast, Famitsu only awarded the game a 25 out of 40 score.

Retrospective reviewers were somewhat less positive about the game, and tended to hold it up as inferior to the Genesis version. Hardcore Gaming summarized their stance on the game as "ultimately, the Game Gear version may not be quite as fun or visually interesting as the original version but is still colorful and quite playable. Furthermore, enough new segments and features have been added that it feels significantly distinct from the original Genesis release. It's definitely worth looking into..." Honest Gamers highly praised the game as the best on the system, stating: "Ristar is the best Game Gear game you could possibly buy, better than any game of its type on the Game Boy Color, and almost as good as its namesake on the Sega Genesis. I was incredibly impressed to see something look and sound so good on the diminutive Game Gear screen, within the quaint limitations of what is mostly Master System hardware. But Sega managed it...even if you already owned the Genesis game and the (Sega) Nomad, you'd still want this". Defunct Games was less enthusiastic, criticizing the graphics, sound and limited replay value, and concluding: "...this version of Ristar is decent. It's pretty fun, and if you're a big fan of platformers and don't mind graphical or audio limitations, Ristar for the Game Gear would make a pretty good addition to your collection. Otherwise, I'd say, if possible, try to get the Genesis version".

== Legacy ==
Unlike the Genesis version of Ristar, which was re-released on several different Sega or Sonic themed video game compilations, the Game Gear version was only re-released once, as of one of twenty games included in "Sonic's PlayPal Plug and Play", a controller that hooks up straight to the television rather than a video game system.
