= Golden Axe II =

1991 video game

- North American box art by Boris Vallejo, featuring the game’s three playable characters
- Developer: Sega
- Publisher: Sega
- Designer: Kazuma Fujii
- Composers: Naofumi Hataya; Masafumi Ogata
- Series: Golden Axe
- Platform: Sega Genesis
- Release: JP: December 27, 1991; NA: January 1992; EU: 1992
- Genre: Beat 'em up
- Modes: Single-player, multiplayer

Golden Axe II (Note: Japanese: ゴールデンアックス II, Hepburn: Gooruden Akkusu Tsū) is a 1991 beat 'em up video game developed and published by Sega for the Sega Genesis. It is a sequel to 1989's Golden Axe, and the second installment of the Golden Axe series. The player controls one of three warriors as they attempt to recover the Golden Axe by slaying Dark Guld and his loyal followers. Much like its predecessor, the gameplay is based around side-scrolling levels where the player fights enemies by using their melee weapon, while riding a beast, or utilizing elemental magic. The game revamps and introduces various gameplay mechanics from its contemporary including the ability to select the level of magic used and an attack that hits all around the player’s character.

Upon release, the game received generally favorable reception from critics. An arcade follow-up to the original game, entitled Golden Axe: The Revenge of Death Adder, was released in 1992, and indirectly addressed the criticisms. Golden Axe II has since appeared on various game compilations and digital game services, and was ported to arcades via the Sega Mega-Tech cabinet.

== Gameplay ==
Ax Battler, one of the playable characters, throwing an enemy at another. Although identical to its predecessor Golden Axe, the game features new and revamped gameplay mechanics from the former.

Golden Axe II is a side-scrolling hack and slash game. The gameplay is identical to its predecessor Golden Axe. The player is given a choice of three fighters: an axe-handling dwarf named Gilius Thunderhead, a barbarian named Ax Battler who wields a two-handed sword and longsword-brandishing amazon named Tyris Flare. Each of the fighters has a unique elemental form of magic which can be used at any time to inflict damage upon enemies. Each fighter is given a set of life bars, which are depleted if the player is hit.

Though the characters and gameplay were mostly unaltered from the first game, there were a few improvements. The "back attack" (performed by pressing the Jump and Attack buttons simultaneously) for each character was changed to a more useful attack that hit enemies on all sides. Enemies could now be thrown in either direction by pressing left or right on the D-pad immediately after picking them up, making it easier to hit other enemies with them or throw them off cliffs. The magic system was also overhauled. In the first game, pressing the magic button used all the player's magic pots. In this game, the player could now use part or all of their magic by holding the button and releasing it when the meter reached the desired level. The magic for each character was also changed; Ax Battler's "exploding" magic from the first game was replaced with wind magic, and Gilius Thunderhead now used rock magic instead of lightning. Tyris Flare retained her fire magic, but was still given entirely new animations for it. Ax Battler now has a longer reach with his weapon than Tyris (in the first Golden Axe, Ax Battler and Tyris had an identical reach) and can throw enemies higher and further. Finally, there were small cosmetic changes in the form of a shoulder guard for Ax Battler and black gauntlets for Gilius Thunderhead. Between each level, a rating is awarded to the player(s) based on their performance, with a final rating given at the end of the game. A small exposition of the main story is also shown.

There are two types of game modes. One is "The Duel", where players are pitted against enemies in an arena, battling one after the other and gradually getting more difficult. The other is normal mode, where players must navigate through different areas battling various enemies. Normal mode puts the player into the story of the game, where they must recover the Golden Axe from Dark Guld. The player must navigate through multiple areas until they reach Dark Guld's castle. There are seven stages in total, including Ravaged Village, Ruins, Tower, Dragon's Throat Cave, Castle Gates, Castle, and Dark Guld's Chamber. Each area ends with a boss where the player must battle a large group of enemies at once. Magic books are also gathered along the way, allowing the player to increase their magic meter. There are also three Bizarrians that can be mounted and used against enemies, including Chicken Legs, Green Dragons, and Fire Dragons. The duel mode consists of multiple rounds where the player must defeat an enemy, or a group of enemies. Every round is set in the same scenery and the player must be victorious over 15 levels to complete the duel.

== Plot ==
A few years after the defeat of the warlord Death Adder, (Note: As depicted in Golden Axe.) a tyrant by the name of Dark Guld is released from an ancient imprisonment. Joined by his loyal clan, Guld manages to lay waste to countries across the land of Yuria, causing widespread chaos. Guld also manages to gain possession of the Golden Axe, a legendary weapon of formidable power. Not wanting their land to fall into ruin, the barbarian Ax Battler, amazon Tyris Flare, and dwarf Gilus Thunderhead, who had previously defeated Death Adder, embark on a journey to defeat Guld. After traveling for many days, and dispatching some of Dark Guld’s followers, the trio arrive at Guld’s castle and storm its gates, defeating more of his followers in the process. Upon entering the castle’s throne room, the trio encounters Dark Guld, who uses the Golden Axe to enhance his strength. The trio and Guld then duel and after a long battle the trio end up triumphant in defeating him. With Guld and his clan defeated, the land of Yuria ushers in a new era of peace.

== Release ==
The game was released for the Sega Mega-Tech arcade cabinet, that can play a handful of Sega Genesis titles. The game was made available on the compilation for PlayStation 2 and PlayStation Portable, known in the U.S. as Sega Genesis Collection and in Europe as Sega Mega Drive Collection, along with the first game and Golden Axe III and other Genesis/Mega Drive titles. On June 11, 2007, the title was added to the Wii Virtual Console. It is also available on GameTap and iTunes. On June 1, 2010, Sega Mega Drive and Genesis Classics was released on Steam and the Golden Axe trilogy became available for PC. On June 29, 2018, the collection Sega Genesis Classics was released for PlayStation 4, Xbox One and PC, with a Nintendo Switch version following in December that same year. On December 15, 2022, the game was re-released via the Nintendo Classics service.

== Reception ==
Reception

Review scores
Publication	Score
ACE	781/1000
AllGame	3/5
Beep! MegaDrive	7.25/10
Computer and Video Games	78/100
Electronic Gaming Monthly	7/10, 8/10, 7/10, 7/10
Famitsu	7/10, 7/10, 6/10, 5/10
Games-X	4/5
Mean Machines Sega	69%
Console XS	75/100
Game Zone	3/5
Hippon Super!	6/10
Mean Machines	69%
Mega	92%
Mega Action	90%
Mega Drive Advanced Gaming	65%
Mega Play	6/10, 6/10, 6/10, 5/10
Sega Force	84%
Sega Force Mega	88%
Sega Power	81%
Sega Pro	76/100

The Japanese publication Micom BASIC Magazine ranked Golden Axe II second in popularity in its March 1992 issue, and it received a 20.95/30 score in a poll conducted by Mega Drive Fan and a 7.2315/10 score in a 1995 readers' poll conducted by the Japanese Sega Saturn Magazine, ranking among Mega Drive titles at the number 253 spot. The game also received generally favorable reception from critics.

Console XS felt that Golden Axe II was easier than its predecessor. Mega Action praised the game for being bigger and better than the original, but criticizing it for not having too much to offer, concluding: "If you want more of the same, then this is for you" AllGame's Scott Alan Marriott commented that the game has almost exactly the same graphics, sound, and options and nothing really different which makes the sequel stand out, concluding: "The game is still enjoyable for what it is, however, and fans of the original probably won't mind that it's more of the same".

Mega placed the game at number 14 in their Top Mega Drive Games of All Time. In 2017, GamesRadar ranked the game 34th on their "Best Sega Genesis/Mega Drive games of all time."
