= Dragon Coins =

2012 video game

- Developer: Sega
- Publisher: Sega
- Platforms: iOS, Android
- Release: JP: 2012; WW: 8 May 2014
- Genres: Puzzle, role-playing
- Modes: Single-player, multiplayer

Dragon Coins is a mobile video game developed and published by Sega for iOS and Android devices. It was released in Japan in 2012 and North America and Europe in May 2014. The game was successful in Japan, but was not as well received in Western regions, with the game shutting down in August 2015 due to financial difficulties.

== Gameplay ==
The game plays as a combination of Puzzle and Dragons and coin-collecting games found in arcades. The game is free to play with in-app purchases available for the player to purchases the in-game currency, along with other items, using real world currency. The player has to drop coins on to the dragons, which then the dragon charges up its attacks to battle computer-controlled opponents. Sometimes the player will find the dragon with "Special Attacks". If the player loses a round, they will lose small amounts of money earned by previous rounds.

== Development ==
The game was developed by Sega and first released in Japan in 2012. Its initial release featured a crossover with Capcom's Mega Man franchise. The game was later released in North America and Europe on 8 May 2014. In all regions, it was released on the iOS and Android mobile platforms.

The game was shut down on 21 August 2015 in Japan and on the 24 August 2015 in the rest of the world, just a little more than a year after its English release. A Sega representative explained it was due to the game not bringing in an audience sufficient to support running the games servers and updates.

== Reception ==
The game's release was considered a success in Japan, where it was seen as part of a wave of games that used gameplay elements typically found in arcade games and translated them into popular mobile phone games. Serkan Toto, CEO of Kantan Games Inc. - a Tokyo-based video game industry consultancy focused on the Japanese market - cited it as a game that found success in combining elements from Casino games in mobile games as a method of getting around Japan's legal order to stop all kompu gacha-based games at the time. Western reception was less positive, with the game being forced to shut down just over a year after its release. Peter Willington of Pocket Gamer gave the game a 6/10 score, stating that the core gameplay was technically proficient, but that it lacked anything to keep players along for the long-term, concluding that it was "a slick-looking, technically sound digital representation of a penny-pusher, with some very light RPG elements thrown in, but its lack of interaction with others ensures that its simple gameplay tires all the more quickly." Nadia Oxford of Gamezebo gave the game a higher 8/10, referring to it as a good Puzzle & Dragons clone, but as such, lacked originality, and suffered from steep and expensive in-app purchases, hurting its long-term appeal.
