= Altered Beast =

1988 video game

- Japanese arcade flyer
- Developer: Team Shinobi
- Publisher: Sega
- Designer: Makoto Uchida
- Artist: Rieko Kodama
- Composer: Tohru Nakabayashi
- Series: Altered Beast
- Platform: Arcade: Genesis/Mega Drive, Master System, Amiga, Atari ST, Amstrad CPC, Commodore 64, ZX Spectrum, PC Engine CD-ROM², PC Engine, MS-DOS, Famicom, MSX
- Release: June 14, 1988: Arcade; JP: June 14, 1988; NA/EU: June 1988 Genesis/Mega Drive; JP: November 27, 1988; NA: August 1989; PAL: September 1990 Master System; NA/PAL: June 1989 Amiga; EU: 1989; NA: March 1990 Atari ST, CPC; EU: 1989 C64; EU: 1989; NA: February 1990 CD-ROM²; JP: September 22, 1989 PC Engine; JP: September 29, 1989 ZX Spectrum; UK: 1989 MS-DOS; NA: June 1990 Famicom; JP: July 20, 1990
- Genre: Beat 'em up
- Modes: Single-player, multiplayer
- Arcade system: Sega System 16

Altered Beast (Note: Jūōki (獣王記(じゅうおうき); "Beast King's Chronicle")) is a 1988 beat 'em up video game developed by Team Shinobi and published by Sega for arcades. Set in Ancient Greece, the game follows a Roman centurion who is resurrected by the Olympian god Zeus to rescue his daughter Athena from Neff, the demonic ruler of the underworld. By collecting three power-ups in a level, the player character can transform into one of five mythical beasts.

The game's development was led by Makoto Uchida, and marked his first role as a project lead. Uchida and his team used the System 16 arcade system board. Altered Beast was ported to several consoles and home computers, and was the original pack-in game for the Sega Genesis/Mega Drive when the console was launched in North America in 1989 and Europe in 1990.

Altered Beast's arcade release and its ports received generally positive reviews, with mainly praising the gameplay and graphics. The game has been re-released several times for various consoles and as part of video game compilations, and there has been one sequel and one reboot.

== Gameplay ==
The player, with two power-ups obtained, fights a group of the undead to progress forward. Once the player obtains another power-up, they can transform into a beast.

Altered Beast is a side-scrolling beat 'em up game with light platform elements. It has five levels and can be played by up to two players simultaneously. Combat takes place across five levels set in Ancient Greece and populated by aggressive undead creatures and monsters resembling those from Greek mythology. The demonic god Neff waits at the end of each level. Between each level are small animations giving the player glimpses of Athena's peril. The player can punch, kick and jump.

The game's premise is that Neff, ruler of the underworld, captures the goddess Athena. Her angered father, the Olympian god Zeus, decides to choose a champion to save her. Respecting the bravery of Roman Centurions, Zeus resurrects one of them and empowers him as a champion. The player character is the resurrected Roman Centurion, given extra power by Zeus so they can battle Neff and his supernatural minions. In the original arcade version, the end credits include the revelation that the whole game actually depicted a staged film production.

Whenever the player defeats a white two-headed wolf, a Spirit Ball power-up appears. Each obtained Spirit Ball increases the player character's strength and size. Collecting three Spirit Balls allows the player character to transform into a powerful beast form, increasing their combat abilities before having to face Neff at the end of the level. The player character's beast forms include a weredragon, a werebear, a weretiger, a werewolf, or a golden werewolf. Each beast form grants its own abilities. The dragon can unleash lightning bolts and an electric barrier, the bear has a petrifying breath that turns enemies into stone, the tiger can hurl fireballs in a zigzag pattern, the wolf can throw direct, but weak fireballs and has a powerful thrust attack, while the golden werewolf has the same abilities as the wolf form. In the Famicom version, available beasts also include a shark, lion, and phoenix form.

== Development ==
Altered Beast was directed by Makoto Uchida. He took inspiration for the game from The Howling and the music video for the Michael Jackson song "Thriller", as well as movies by Ray Harryhausen, and chose the Greek setting for the powerful characters he had in mind. Uchida admitted he struggled during production because it was his first game he developed. He relied on his lead programmer to help create balance in the gameplay.

One of Uchida's goals was to create flashy visuals that would surprise players, so he asked his lead artist to only focus on the player character's transformation sequences for one month. Additionally, he and his team used the System 16 arcade system board for its ability to add great detail to large character sprites, as well as the visual effects it could provide, such as limbs flying off during combat. Uchida was not impressed by the initial concept art, so he worked with an artist to sketch out his specific ideas on character design. While the results of this were positive, Uchida's lead designer quit the team over this situation. Altered Beast includes Easter eggs which are references to other System 16 titles Alex Kidd: The Lost Stars and Shinobi, as a nod to members on Uchida's team that had worked on those titles previously.

There were planned features for the game that Uchida did not have the opportunity to implement, namely a pressure-sensitive button. Discussions took place, but a deal could not be reached with the owner of the patent of the pressure-sensitive device over the small number to be ordered. The failure to secure the button meant that half of the planned character actions had to be removed. Uchida claimed that the reduced complexity of the game caused by this resulted in players quickly becoming bored of Altered Beast. Despite this, Uchida was proud of the reactions he was getting from players during playtesting.

== Release ==
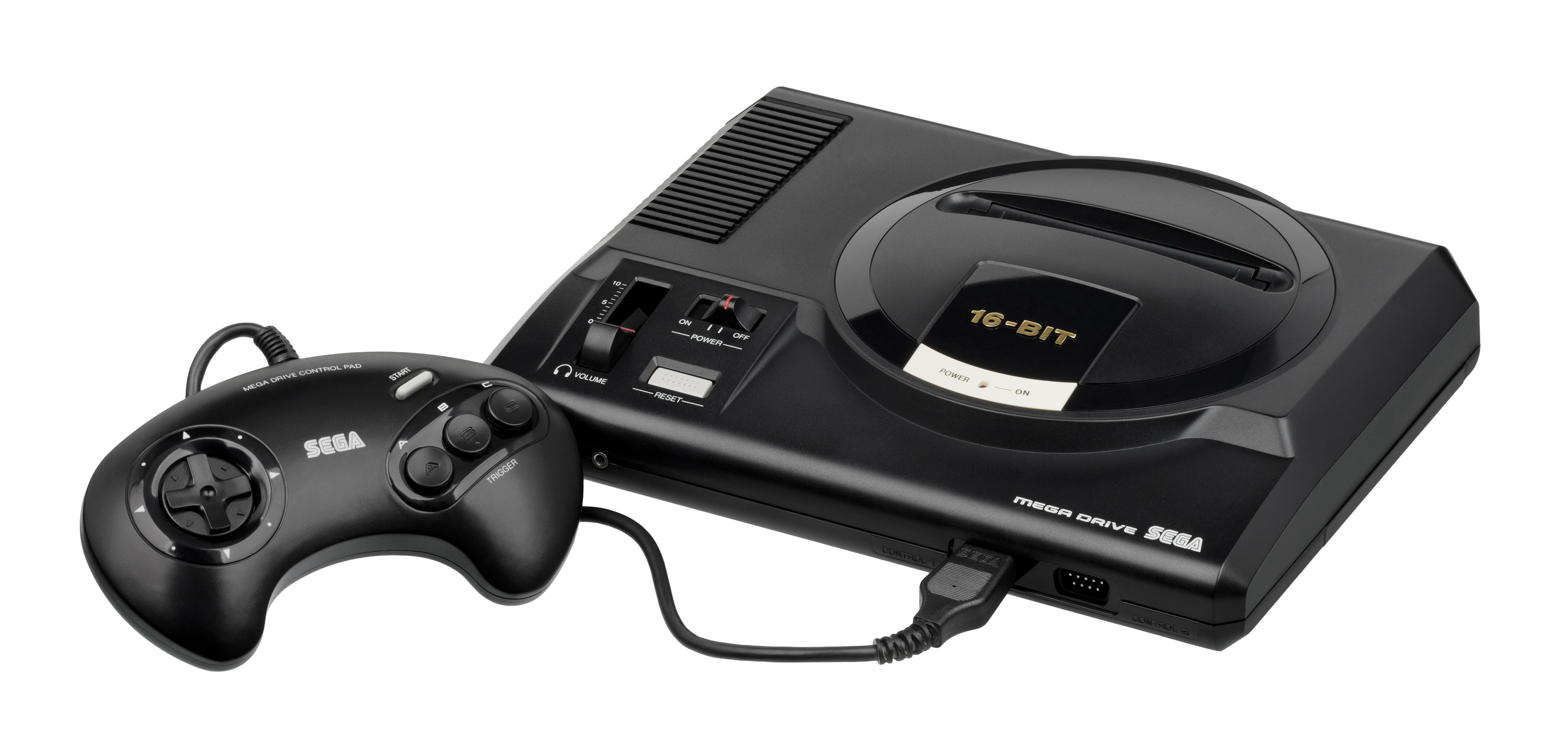
Altered Beast became the pack-in title for the Sega Genesis in North America and the Mega Drive (pictured above) in Europe and Brazil.

Released in June 1988, Altered Beast's arcade version proved to be more popular overseas than it did in Japan. As a result of its popularity, it was selected to be ported and made the pack-in game for the Sega Genesis and Mega Drive in North America and Europe. Uchida was not involved directly with either the Genesis or the Master System port, though he did give some advice and noted he was not worried about the Genesis port because its hardware was based on the System 16 arcade system board he used. He had hoped to implement the pressure-sensitive button for the Genesis port, but could not due to tight development time and the lack of the button in Genesis hardware. Since Altered Beast was not the pack-in game in Japan, Uchida did not get to see his game included with the console. By the time he went to the US three years later, all of the available consoles instead included Sonic the Hedgehog, which replaced Altered Beast. The main reason for this change was because of concerns over themes of zombies and magic, which were not popular in the Bible Belt.

In addition to the Genesis and Master System, Altered Beast was ported to several platforms, including the PC Engine, PC Engine CD-ROM², Famicom, Atari ST, Commodore 64, ZX Spectrum, Amstrad CPC, and Amiga. Several of the conversions for European systems were completed by Activision. Certain differences are seen between the several versions of the game. Some of them, like the Master System version, were missing levels. Interlink developed the Famicom edition, which was released only in Japan by Asmik Corporation; it includes unique forms such as a humanoid lion, shark, and phoenix as well as additional levels. Due to its rivalry with Nintendo, Sega did not publish the game on the platform.

The Genesis version is included in the compilations Sega Smash Pack, Sega Genesis Collection, and Sonic's Ultimate Genesis Collection, with the latter two also including the arcade version as an unlockable game. The Wii's Virtual Console service, the Xbox 360's Xbox Live Arcade, and the PS3's PlayStation Network all received a version of the game. In 2017, Altered Beast was re-released on iOS and Android as a part of the Sega Forever collection. M2 released a 3D port for the Nintendo 3DS as a digital download on the Nintendo eShop. The game was included as one of the pre-loaded games on the SEGA Genesis Mini. It was also released on the Nintendo Classics service on December 16, 2021.

== Reception ==
Reception

Review scores
Publication	Score					
Publication	Amiga	Arcade	Atari ST	Master System	Sega Genesis	TurboGrafx-16
ACE	825/1000				940/1000	
AllGame		3.5/5		2.5/5	3/5	
Computer and Video Games	69%		68%	60%	87%	
HobbyConsolas				45%		
The Games Machine (UK)	69%		70%	43%	87%	60%
Commodore User		7/10				
GamesPreview (DK)				43%		
PowerPlay (DE)					53%	
Sega Power				2/5	2/5	
Sega Pro				68%		
S: The Sega Magazine				53%		
VideoGame (BR)				5/5		

In Japan, Altered Beast was the second highest-grossing arcade game of July 1988.

Upon its initial arcade release, Altered Beast received mixed reviews. Commodore User called it "a clever game, and well worth a few tens of anybody's money." Computer and Video Games criticized the game's plot as being unoriginal and the graphics as "large and clumsily drawn". Your Sinclair stated the game was "not recommended to those that are still living". By contrast, Crash called the graphics "nifty" and suggested that despite the repetitive plot, the gameplay is compelling. The Games Machine offered a positive review, stating that while the game is not highly visual like Out Run or Space Harrier, the gameplay makes it worth a play.

The various ports of Altered Beast received more mixed reviews. The Games Machine gave the Mega Drive version a positive review on the faithful arcade conversion. In 1989, ACE praised the Mega Drive conversion as never having played better on any home system, and they rated it as the best Mega Drive game available at the time. Sega Power, however, criticized the same version for jerky gameplay and bad scrolling. The PC Engine CD conversion was panned by The Games Machine, which called the port "a disappointment" and suggested players who want to play the game try the Mega Drive version instead.

Julian Rignall of Computer and Video Games criticized the Master System version, stating that while he is a fan of the arcade version, the reduced graphics, slow gameplay of the port, and fussy collision detection are significant issues. Contrary to their praise for the Mega Drive port, The Games Machine called the Master System version "a middling conversion of a nice coin-op". Electronic Gaming Monthly was more positive, claiming the game "does a good job of capturing most of the familiar play mechanics of its arcade cousin." Sega Pro called the Master System version "a shame, since the Mega Drive version was a great success." S: The Sega Magazine stated that there are better arcade conversions on the Master System and Altered Beast, while having a passable soundtrack, suffers from poor animation and control issues.

Mega placed the game at #10 in their list of the 10 Worst Mega Drive Games of All Time. Its re-release for the Wii's Virtual Console was given an indifferent reception by GameSpot and IGN, describing the game as merely decent with some nostalgic value. The Xbox Live Arcade re-release was even described by IGN as a "relic of the arcade heyday that just doesn't hold up today".

== Legacy ==
Video game journalist Ken Horowitz stated that video gamers identify the "rise from your grave" opening from the game, whether they are fans of Sega's games or not. According to Horowitz, Altered Beast's biggest attraction is its charm, which was reduced in the modifications to the Genesis port, and has called the game "one of the more memorable concepts Sega conceived." Uchida has expressed surprise over the sustained popularity around his arcade games, stating "When I occasionally visit videogame arcades in the US, I still see people playing my Altered Beast and Golden Axe games. It proves to me that, if the game is good, people will still pay good money to play it."

=== Sequels ===
Altered Beast has received two sequels. Altered Beast: Guardian of the Realms, developed by 3d6 Games and published by THQ, is a 2002 sequel for the Game Boy Advance in the style of the original arcade game. It adds new features like power-ups and beast forms, as well as 15 levels. While the graphics are improved compared to the original game, the scrolling mechanic remains the same. A PlayStation 2 title known as Jūōki: Project Altered Beast in Japan and Altered Beast in Europe was released by Sega in 2005. It was also planned for a North American release, but was later cancelled. Rather than serving as a sequel, the newer title features a more modern setting that is unconnected to the original game, with a darker and more violent tone. Uchida advised on the project, and stated, "We really couldn't steer away from the violence aspect. The American marketing side was cheering us on, so we did it as best we could." The 2005 Altered Beast received mixed reviews for its camera system and poor graphics.

== Film adaptation ==
In 2014, Sega announced a partnership with Evan Cholfin for film and TV projects based on their games. Altered Beast was announced as a live action project in 2016, which has not materialized as of 2026.

=== Popular culture ===
Altered Beast has been referenced in other media. In 1993, Matthew Sweet named his album Altered Beast after the game. Sweet told Spin magazine the title meant "whatever is inside you that someday might explode, and maybe you don't know it's there", which he found similar to the game, where "you have to find these little power-up things, and when you eat them you become the Altered Beast, this other creature that's really powerful and violent". The character Neff, in his Rhino form as the boss of the game's final level, appeared in the 2012 Disney film Wreck-It Ralph, along with Sonic the Hedgehog villain Doctor Eggman.
