= Virtua Tennis Challenge =

2012 video game

- App Store icon
- Developer: Sega
- Publisher: Sega
- Series: Virtua Tennis
- Platforms: Android, iOS
- Release: Android; March 13, 2012 iOS; May 24, 2012
- Genre: Sports game
- Modes: Single-player, multiplayer

Virtua Tennis Challenge is a sports game developed and published by Sega for Android and iOS. It was first released in 2012, with Sega later releasing it as a part of its Sega Forever mobile game platform in 2017.

== Games mode ==
Exhibition Match

The users play it in singles or doubles. They choose between all the available players and the World Tour profiles that they created. Different options can be configured such as the stadium, difficulty, among others.

SPT World Tour

In it, the users create a player, choose their characteristics and game skills, sign up for the different tournaments available every day throughout the season, win sponsorships throughout the career and compete until they are number 1 in the professional ranking.

Multiplayer

The users play games against other people using bluetooth.

Training

The players improve the skills by training against their strongest rival.

== Tournaments ==
The game contains a total of 18 tournaments available for SPT World Tour mode.

Main Championships (Grand Slams)

- (Australia) Melbourne - Hard (Australian Open)
- (France) Paris - Clay (Roland Garros)
- (United Kingdom) London - Grass (Wimbledon)
- (United States) New York - Hard (US Open)

Final Championship of the SPT (ATP World Tour Finals)

- (United States) Chicago - Hard

SPT 1000 Masters (ATP Masters 1000)

- (United Arab Emirates) Dubai - Hard
- (Spain) Madrid - Clay
- (Czech Republic) Prague - Grass
- (United States) Los Angeles - Indoor

SPT 500 Championship Advantage (ATP 500)

- (China) Shanghai - Hard
- (Japan) Tokyo - Indoor
- (Egypt) Cairo - Hard
- (Sweden) Stockholm - Hard
- (Canada) Vancouver - Grass

SPT 250 Aspirants (ATP 250)

- (United States) Washington - Hard
- (Mexico) Acapulco - Hard
- (Germany) Hamburg - Clay
- (United Kingdom) London - Grass

== Reception ==
Reception

Aggregate score
Aggregator	Score
Metacritic	75/100

Review scores
Publication	Score
Gamezebo	4/5
MacLife	2.5/5
MeriStation	6.2/10
Pocket Gamer	4/5
TouchArcade	2.5/5

The iOS version received "generally favorable reviews" according to the review aggregation website Metacritic.

== Removal from App Stores ==
The game, along with a few other Sega Forever games, was unlisted from app stores in mid-2025. Players who downloaded the game before the removal can still play the game offline.
