= 3d6 Games =

American video game developer

- Industry: Video games
- Founded: 1999
- Defunct: 2013-2015
- Headquarters: San Mateo, California; Westlake Village, California
- Key people: William S. Schmitt, Troy Sheets
- Products: Altered Beast: Guardian of the Realms; Army Men: Sarge's Heroes 2 Disney's Atlantis: The Lost Empire; The Revenge of Shinobi GBA; Tetris Worlds GBA
- Website: http://www.3d6games.com/

3d6 Games was an American video game developer founded by ex-Digital Eclipse programmers William S. Schmitt and Troy Sheets.

The studio was initially active between 1999 and 2002, during which period it created games exclusively for the Game Boy Color and Game Boy Advance. The company developed original games based on properties such as Tetris Worlds (IP by Blue Planet Software), The Revenge of Shinobi (IP by Sega) and Altered Beast: Guardian of the Realms (also original IP by Sega).

Two internal projects from the studio, Rocket Dog! and Slider, were never completed. In 2012, 3d6 Games was relaunched as a developer for mobile games for iOS, Android and Windows 8. However, the company only released one game (Sums Academy for iOS) after the relaunch, and has not been active since 2013.

== Games ==
- Madden NFL 2001 (2000, Game Boy Color)
- Road Rash (2000, Game Boy Color)
- Army Men: Sarge's Heroes 2 (2000, Game Boy Color)
- Tetris Worlds (2001, Game Boy Advance)
- Disney's Atlantis: The Lost Empire (2001, Game Boy Advance)
- Madden NFL 2002 (2001, Game Boy Advance)
- The Revenge of Shinobi (2002, Game Boy Advance)
- Altered Beast: Guardian of the Realms (2002, Game Boy Advance)
- Sums Academy (2013, iPhone/iPad)
