= Golden Axe (video game) =

1989 video game

- Japanese arcade flyer
- Developer: Team Shinobi
- Publisher: Sega
- Designer: Makoto Uchida
- Series: Golden Axe
- Platform: Arcade: Mega Drive/Genesis, Master System, PC Engine CD-ROM², Amiga, Amstrad CPC, Atari ST, Commodore 64, IBM PC, ZX Spectrum, WonderSwan Color
- Release: 27 January 1989: Arcade; JP: 27 January 1989; NA/EU: May 1989 Mega Drive/Genesis; JP: 23 December 1989; NA: January 1990; EU: November 1990 Master System; NA/EU: 1990 CD-ROM²; JP: 10 March 1990 Home computers; UK: November 1990 WonderSwan Color; JP: 28 February 2002
- Genre: Beat 'em up
- Modes: Single-player, multiplayer
- Arcade system: Sega System 16B

Golden Axe (Note: Japanese: ゴールデンアックス, Hepburn: Gooruden Akkusu) is a 1989 beat 'em up video game developed and published by Sega for arcades on the Sega System 16B hardware. Players control one of three warriors who must free the fantasy land of Yuria from the tyrannical rule of Death Adder, who wields the titular Golden Axe. The lead designer was Makoto Uchida, who was also responsible for the creation of Sega's earlier Altered Beast (1988).

Golden Axe was well received at the time of release, and was later ported to several home systems, including Sega's own Mega Drive/Genesis and Master System. The game's success spawned a franchise with several sequels and spin-offs, beginning with Golden Axe II in 1991.

== Plot ==
The game takes place in the fictional land of Yuria, a Conan the Barbarian-style high fantasy medieval world. An evil entity known as Death Adder has captured the King of Yuria and his daughter, and holds them captive in their castle. He also finds the Golden Axe, the magical emblem of Yuria, and threatens to destroy both the axe and the royal family unless the people of Yuria accept him as their ruler. Three warriors set out on a quest to rescue the King and avenge their losses at the hands of Death Adder. The first is a battle axe-wielding dwarf, Gilius Thunderhead, from the mines of Wolud, whose twin brother was killed by the soldiers of Death Adder. The second is a broadsword-wielding barbarian, Ax Battler, looking for revenge for the murder of his mother. The last is a longsword-wielding Amazonian, Tyris Flare, whose parents were both murdered by Death Adder.

The warriors rescue the inhabitants of the ransacked Turtle Village, which turns out to be situated on the shell of a giant turtle. The turtle takes the characters across the sea, and they then fly to the castle on the back of a giant eagle. Once at the castle, they defeat Death Adder, who is wielding the Golden Axe, and save the land. In the Mega Drive/Genesis, Mega-CD/Sega CD, Game Boy Advance, and WonderSwan Color ports, the characters also battle Death Adder's mentor, Death Bringer, as the true final boss. After the final battle, the warriors receive a magical golden axe that imbues the player with immortality.

The arcade release of the game concludes with a fourth wall-breaking end sequence depicting three children playing a Golden Axe arcade system in a closed arcade casino. The arcade game short-circuits and causes an electrical fire, which magically makes all the characters from within the game enter the "real world", and begin chasing the kids out of the building, while the three warriors that were the last to exit the arcade, run in hot pursuit to rescue them.

The plot of the PC Engine CD-ROM² version, which was the only version to have animated cutscenes, has significant differences to other versions. In this version, Gilius Thunderhead, Ax Battler and Tyris Flare were the inhabitants of a long-established kingdom called Firewood (which Tyris’s parents were the reigning monarchs of) that was destroyed by Death Adder and his army 20 years ago. After Death Adder is seemingly killed following the destruction of Firewood, he is revived during a ceremony by his strongest warrior, the evil knight Heineken, 20 years later. Death Adder subsequently leads Heineken and his other followers to the kingdom of Southwood, devastating the country and capturing its king and queen; prompting Gilius Thunderhead, Ax Battler and Tyris Flare to set off on a mission to rescue them. After defeating Heineken and another knight outside the castle where Death Adder is holding the king and queen of Southwood hostage, the chosen character then faces and ultimately kills Death Adder, freeing the monarchs in the process. Each of the individual characters have their own unique ending, with Ax Battler initially becoming Southwood’s general before setting off to a continent and eventually becoming king, Tyris Flare restoring Firewood, and Gilius Thunderhead helping Tyris Flare rebuild Firewood and becoming its Grand Minister.

== Gameplay ==
Progress in the game is made by fighting through Death Adder's henchmen, including men armed with clubs and maces, skeleton warriors, and knights. Players are able to attack by using their weapon and casting spells that hurt all enemies on the screen. The force of this magic depends on the number of "bars" of magic power currently available. The bars are filled by collecting "magic potions" attained by kicking the blue thief character who then drops the potions. This character appears during regular levels and bonus stages in between levels. There will also occasionally be a green thief character that drops food which replenishes health. The dwarf Gilius is able to cast lightning spells. The barbarian Ax casts earth spells and the female warrior Tyris casts fire magic. Each character has a different maximum number of magic bars and varying ranges of attack.

Various steeds known as bizarrians are found in the game. These can be mounted when the enemy rider is knocked off, or if one is found dormant. The least powerful steed is known as the Cockatrice (which also appeared in Altered Beast), that can be used to knock down enemies with a swipe of its tail. The more powerful dragon, which can either shoot fireballs or breathe fire depending on its colour scheme, is found later in the game.

In certain areas, skeleton swordsmen emerge from the ground, like in the film Jason and the Argonauts.

In addition to the main quest, some home versions included "duel mode", a survival mode type game that pitted players against increasingly powerful foes in consecutive rounds of play. This mode also featured a two-player one-on-one option.

== Development ==
Lead designer and producer Makoto Uchida was fond of action movies, particularly the Conan films, and wanted to create a game influenced by them. He said that the development team was small and making the game took about a year. Uchida's "idea was to come up with a Double Dragon that was not a Double Dragon… Technos was an experienced rival who had been working on the Kunio-Kun series, so there was no way we could compete if we did the same thing as them. I had a feeling that arcade games should be competitive against the great hit console title Dragon Quest (created by Enix) and therefore studied the world of magic and swords, combined this with the gameplay of Double Dragon, and finally came up with the concept of Golden Axe." Uchida also cited the original Street Fighter (1987) as an influence, particularly how players could combine button moves and stick presses to perform individual attacks.

== Ports ==
The Mega Drive/Genesis version remained largely faithful to the arcade game, adding a level and a duel mode, along with a new ending.

The IBM PC compatible port, released in 1990, is similar to the Mega Drive/Genesis version, but includes a 256-colour VGA mode as well as support for EGA, CGA, and Hercules modes. The Atari ST and Amiga ports, released in late 1990 by Virgin Software, are similar to the arcade. The Amiga port is similar to the arcade game, with some palette changes and without parallax scrolling.

Variations of the original game have also been released. The Master System version of the game retells the original story from the perspective of Tarik, a barbarian with resemblances to Ax Battler (much like all the other barbarians in the entire series: Kain Grinder, Stern Blade and Kain Blade). While the game is only one-player, it features all of the levels and magic powers of the arcade version. In Japan, Golden Axe was released by Telenet for the PC Engine CD-ROM² in 1990, with high-quality resampled music and cutscenes.

== Reception ==
Contemporary reviews

Review scores
Publication	Score						
Publication	Amiga	Arcade	Atari ST	C64	Master System	Sega Genesis	ZX
ACE		Positive			890/1000		
Crash							76%
Computer and Video Games	90%	80%	91%		92%	95%	
Electronic Gaming Monthly					31/40	29/40	
Game Informer						8.75/10	
Joystick	78%				90%	91%	
Mean Machines						91%	
Player One					85%	93%	
Raze						92%	
Sinclair User		8/10					71%
The Games Machine (UK)		Positive			81%	92%	
Your Sinclair		81%					91%
Zero	83%				85%	94%	
Zzap!64	78%			96%			
Commodore User	78%	89%					
Console XS					80%		
Mega Action						82%	
Game Mania					92%		
Mega Drive Advanced Gaming						86%	
MicroHobby							88%
Sega Power					4/5	82%	
Sega Pro					91%	91%	
The One	5/5						

The Mega Drive version of Golden Axe received positive reviews from European gaming publications. British magazine Computer & Video Games awarded the game 95% and its "C+VG Hit!" distinction, praising its presentation and faithful conversion of the arcade original. In France, J. M. Destroy of Joystick awarded the game 91%, commending its graphics, varied enemies, magical attacks and two-player gameplay. He regarded it as one of the most impressive Mega Drive conversions he had encountered.

German magazine Aktueller Software Markt praised the game's colourful graphics, choice of playable characters and cooperative action, although reviewer Torsten Oppermann considered its underlying gameplay relatively straightforward. The magazine awarded graphics 11 out of 12, with scores of 8 for sound and gameplay, 9 for motivation and 8 for value for money. Spanish magazine Micromanía awarded the game 9 out of 10, praising its faithful recreation of the arcade version and the additional options introduced in the Mega Drive conversion.

=== Commercial ===
In Japan, Game Machine listed Golden Axe on their 1 July 1989 issue as being the second most successful table arcade cabinet of the month. It went on to be the 18th highest-grossing arcade game of 1989 in Japan. In the United States, it was the highest-grossing arcade game of January 1990.

In 1991, it reached number 2 in the ZX Spectrum full price charts, behind Teenage Mutant Ninja Turtles. The Xbox Live Arcade digital version of Golden Axe sold 167,935 units on the Xbox 360 console, as of 2011.

In Sweden, Golden Axe was the best-selling Mega Drive game of 1990, according to sales rankings supplied by distributor Brio.

=== Accolades ===
Upon release of the home conversions, the game received the "C+VG Hit!" award from Computer and Video Games, the "Star Buy" award from The One for Amiga Games, the "Zero Console Classic" award from Zero magazine, and a Gold Medal from Zzap!64 magazine.

In 1991, PC Format named Golden Axe one of the 50 best computer games ever, describing it as "deliciously animated hacking, slashing and generally whaling". In 1993, the ZX Spectrum version of the game was voted number 60 in the Your Sinclair Readers' Top 100 Games of All Time. In 1995, Flux magazine rated the Mega Drive version 70th in their "Top 100 Video Games." In 1996, GamesMaster ranked the Mega Drive version 100th on their "Top 100 Games of All Time."

=== Retrospective ===
Reviewing the game's appearance in Sega Arcade Classics for the Sega CD in 1993, Glenn Rubenstein commented that it had become outdated in the years since its original release.

Retrospectively, GameRankings gave the Sega Genesis version an aggregate rating of 69% based on six reviews published online in the 2000s. Metacritic gave the Xbox 360 version an aggregate rating of 68 out of 100.

TouchArcade rated the iOS version 3.5 out of 5 stars.

== Releases ==
The Mega Drive/Genesis version was later released in other compilations–Sega Smash Pack, Sega Genesis Collection (Sega Mega Drive Collection), Sonic's Ultimate Genesis Collection (Sega Mega Drive Ultimate Collection)–and on the Virtual Console. A one-player only Sega CD version released as part of the Sega Classics Arcade Collection, with CD audio background music and voice-overs from the arcade version.

The arcade version was also on the Virtual Console and Xbox Live Arcade. A port of the game was released on PlayStation Network on 12 July 2011 and has been available free for PlayStation Plus users.

The game was released as part of the handheld TV game Arcade Legends Sega Genesis Volume 1. An enhanced remake with 3D graphics and orchestral music was released for PlayStation 2 as part of the Sega Ages line.

In August 2017, the Mega Drive/Genesis version was released for iOS and Android. It is now part of the Sega Forever service.

On 25 October 2021, The Mega Drive/Genesis version was released via the Nintendo Classics service.
