= The Revenge of Shinobi (2002 video game) =

- North American box art
- Developer: 3d6 Games
- Publisher: Sega: NA: THQ
- Series: Shinobi
- Platform: Game Boy Advance
- Release: NA: November 19, 2002; PAL: May 23, 2003
- Genres: Action, platform, hack and slash
- Mode: Single-player

The Revenge of Shinobi is a 2002 hack-and-slash action game developed by 3d6 Games and published by THQ for the Game Boy Advance. Although both games share the same title and follow the exploits of a ninja character, the game is not a continuation or port of the Mega Drive/Genesis game of the same name.

== Gameplay ==
Shinobi engages in mixed-weapon combat with an enemy in a Japan-inspired cemetery setting.

The Revenge of Shinobi's gameplay is that of a typical side-scroller. The player controls Shinobi, a ninja who is on a quest to stop a warlord named Ashira-o. Shinobi's main weapon is a katana, and he can also attack with shurikens. He later gains the abilities to double-jump and use dark magic and stealth moves. Most of the game's enemies are samurai and other ninja. There are five bosses throughout the game who control the other enemies.

== Reception ==
Reception

Aggregate score
Aggregator	Score
Metacritic	51/100

Review scores
Publication	Score
AllGame	3/5
Game Informer	6/10
GamePro	2.5/5
GameSpot	4.3/10
GameSpy	1/5
GameZone	4.6/10
Jeuxvideo.com	9/20
Nintendo Power	3.1/5
Nintendo World Report	7/10
X-Play	2/5

The Revenge of Shinobi received mixed reviews according to the review aggregation website Metacritic. GameSpot writer Frank Provo focused on the monotonous, unchallenging nature of the gameplay. He also noted that although Shinobi has many abilities at his arsenal, there is not much need to use them. GameSpy's Benjamin Turner echoed these points, also criticizing the password system and artificial intelligence. Minimal praise focused on the audio and graphics.

GameSpot named it the most disappointing Game Boy Advance game of 2002.
