= Golden Axe =

Video game series

- Golden Axe logo. The kanji 戦斧 (pronounced senpu) translates to "battle axe".
- Genres: Beat 'em up Hack & slash
- Developer: Sega
- Creator: Makoto Uchida
- Platforms: Arcade, Genesis, Mega-CD, Game Gear, Master System, Sega Mega-Play, GameTap, IBM PC, Amiga, Atari ST, Amstrad CPC, Commodore 64, PC Engine CD, WonderSwan, ZX Spectrum, Wii, Xbox 360, PlayStation 3, Virtual Console, iOS, Android, Windows
- First release: Golden Axe; January 27, 1989
- Latest release: Golden Axe: Beast Rider; October 14, 2008
- Spin-offs: Action-adventure games, fighting game

Golden Axe (ゴールデンアックス, Gōruden Akkusu) is a series of side-scrolling beat 'em up arcade video games developed by Sega. The series takes place in a medieval fantasy world where several heroes have the task of recovering the legendary Golden Axe, the mainstay element of the series.

== Main series ==
=== Golden Axe ===
Golden Axe is a side-scrolling arcade beat 'em up game released in 1989 by Sega. Makoto Uchida was the primary developer of the game and was also responsible for the creation of Altered Beast. The game places the player in control of one of three warriors, each bent on revenge against the vile dictator Death Adder. Death Adder has taken over the once peaceful land of Yuria and murdered their friend and partner, Alex. Several ports of the game were created, most notably for the Mega Drive/Genesis and Master System. Several sequels followed.

The game focuses on three heroes. One of them is a battle-axe-wielding dwarf, Gilius Thunderhead, from the mines of Wolud, whose twin brother was killed by the soldiers of Death Adder. Another is a male barbarian, Ax Battler, wielding a two-handed broadsword, looking for revenge for the murder of his mother. The last is a longsword-wielding amazon, Tyris Flare, whose parents were killed by Death Adder.

Progress is made through the game by hacking and slashing your way through Adder's forces. Aiding the characters in this quest is their ability to cast spells that hurt all enemies on the screen. The force of this magic depends on the number of "bars" of magic power currently available. The bars are filled by collecting blue 'magic potions' found throughout the game. The male warrior Ax, limited to 4 bars, can cast Earth spells. The dwarf Gilius, limited to 3 bars, casts lightning spells. The female warrior Tyris can cast devastating fire magic, but her most powerful spell costs 6 bars.

=== Golden Axe II ===
Each of the heroes from the first game returns to battle the forces of evil villain Dark Guld in this sequel. While Golden Axe II was a Mega Drive/Genesis exclusive from a development point of view, it saw limited arcade exposure in the MegaPlay series of arcade machines. Released in 1991, the game featured new magic for each of the heroes, with the characteristic magic pots from the first game replaced by spell books this time around.

Many video game magazine editors of the time expressed that the game was very likely rushed into production to give Sega another popular title to enable the Mega Drive/Genesis to compete with its new rival, the Super NES. In most respects, this sequel was essentially the same as the original, though it had new sprites for enemy characters and new levels. Many fans were disappointed with this title as they were expecting more than a rehash of the first title. However, the title had the virtue of not straying too far from a successful formula and was still quite popular upon its release.

=== Golden Axe: The Revenge of Death Adder ===
In 1992, Sega released Golden Axe: The Revenge of Death Adder in arcades. Despite its popularity, the game remained an arcade exclusive up until its appearance in 2020 on the Astro City Mini and Arcade1Up's smaller scale recreation of the original arcade cabinet.

Only Gilius Thunderhead makes a return, riding the back of the new character, Goah the giant. The rest of the cast is all new and includes Stern Blade, the barbarian, Dora, the female centaur, and Little Trix, a halfling who carries a pitchfork. The main enemy is once again Death Adder.

As well as introducing multiple paths to the franchise, the magic aspect was adjusted. Though still found in the classic Golden Axe pots, the magic spells did not increase in power with the number of pots collected but required a set number to work. The Revenge of Death Adder was the only Golden Axe game in which one of the magic attacks was not offensive, as Little Trix grew apple trees with fruit that replenished health.

At the game's end, Death Adder rises one more time. Gilius sacrifices his life to finally end Adder's. During the end cinematic, Gilius is shown in a bar with every other character, and a banner appears saying, "See you Next Game!"

=== Golden Axe III ===
Released in 1993, after Revenge of the Death Adder, the third Golden Axe game on the Mega Drive was released only in Japan. However, the game was available for a while in North America on the Sega Channel, Sega's modem-based game downloading system. It was brought to Europe and North America on the Wii's Virtual Console. The game's lineup of playable characters includes swordsman Kain Grinder (カイン・グリンダー), swordswoman Sarah Barn (サラ・バーン), giant Braoude Cragger (プラウド・クラッガー) and beastman Chronos "Evil" Lait (クロノス・”イビル”・レート). Gilius also appears as a non-playable character at the character select screen.

In this game, the object is to travel along several truly branching paths and eventually defeat the main boss of the game, the Prince of Darkness. The player can choose different branching paths in this game toward that objective, just as in Revenge of Death Adder. The paths in this game are more elaborate and do not loop back together. Many of the characters are good characters that were possessed, and once beaten, they are freed. A king turned into an anthropomorphic eagle is a recurring boss who may be Prince Hellbringer's right-hand man, and is playable in VS mode.

As opposed to Golden Axe II, where the characters, moves, and controls remained largely the same, Golden Axe III brought many changes to the gameplay. The background scenery was less lush and colorful than in previous games, as were the sprites themselves. There was a greater variety of moves. Furthermore, there were several abilities unique to certain characters: for example, the Braoude could throw, while the Chronos and Sarah could double jump and wall jump. Finally, each character had a super-move with its own unique button combination.

Some features were returned to the title that had been cut in previous sequels. Golden Axe III brought back the thieves from the original game, rather than the mages from Golden Axe II. Also, extra lives could be gained by freeing prisoners scattered throughout the levels. The magic system was returned to the original version, where all pots are used at the same time, as opposed to the improved system in Golden Axe II that allowed the player to only use as many spellbooks as they wanted.

Critics applauded Sega's decision not to release Golden Axe III in North America, speculating that the game's drab graphics and generally mediocre quality would have damaged the Sega Genesis's reputation.

=== Golden Axe: Beast Rider ===
Golden Axe: Beast Rider features the return of Tyris Flare, the female amazon warrior from the first installments of the series. Golden Axe: Beast Rider was released in October 2008.

== Spin-offs ==
=== Golden Axe Warrior ===
This Master System title tells another epic tale about the Golden Axe. It is an action-adventure game similar to The Legend of Zelda. The storyline continues the theme of the original Golden Axe games. The game's unit of currency is horns, and it is to be imagined that the hero cut these off of the enemies he killed.

=== Ax Battler: A Legend of Golden Axe ===
Released for the Game Gear, this action-adventure title follows the legend of the character Ax Battler. Unlike its console counterpart, it is based more on Zelda II: The Adventure of Link than the original game. The player moves around a top-view overworld, and enemies randomly attack. However, the player can not see them like in Zelda II. When a battle begins, the transitions to a platform-style fighting environment. After killing the foe (or the foe wounding them), the hero returns to the overworld.

Unlike previous Golden Axe games, the player can learn new attacks and moves at the training dojos in each town. The currency in this game is pots, the traditional Golden Axe magic-usage item. Pots double as both currency and an offensive attack.

=== Golden Axe: The Duel ===
Released in 1994 in the arcades and in 1995 for the Sega Saturn, Golden Axe: The Duel is a one-on-one fighting game set years after the original trilogy and featuring a new cast of characters, including descendants of the initial cast. Though the potion-dropping imp mechanic was praised, most dismissed the game as a decent but undistinguished one-on-one fighter.

== Cancelled prototype ==
The Sega Reborn project was originally planned for development by Sega Studios Australia in the early 2010s, which would have included 3D reboots of the original game, along with those of Streets of Rage and Altered Beast. However, the project was cancelled after Sega Studios Australia closed down in 2013. As part of Sega's 60th anniversary celebration, a working proof-of-concept prototype of the planned Golden Axe reboot, posthumously titled Golden Axed: A Cancelled Prototype, received a limited one-day release on Steam on October 18, 2020.

The release of the prototype received controversy from fans and critics when one of its original developers, Tim Dawson, spoke up in opposition to the lack of any credits on the cancelled game. He also took issue with the fact that the game was described as "buggy" and "janky" when it was actually created under crunch conditions, and that, as a fan of the series, he had worked "long 7 day work weeks" on developing it before it was arbitrarily cancelled for lacking a "wow factor" and being too different from God of War, making him feel "dead inside". This led to Sega Europe issuing an apology and modifying the game's description to remove the offending text, saying that it was a comment on that version of the game rather than the quality of the work itself.

== Future ==
It was announced that a new Golden Axe game was in development at Sega, during The Game Awards 2023, which is a part of an initiative to revive many of its dormant franchises.

== Characters ==
- Ax Battler is a barbarian hero. He uses a claymore while wearing a speedo and blue boots as well as iron bracers and a gorget. He calls upon volcanic magic, deploying lava and powerful eruptive blasts. Ax's mother is murdered by Death Adder's forces, providing his motive in the original Golden Axe. Ax was given a solo game for the Sega Game Gear title Ax Battler: A Legend of Golden Axe, in which he is charged with saving another kingdom. Battler is the most balanced character, having a better striking range and less spell-power than Tyris, and more powerful magic but not the extended physical reach of Gilius.
- Tyris Flare is an Amazon who wields a cinquedea-type sword while wearing a white bikini, bracers and red boots. Both her parents are murdered by Death Adder's forces, leading her to seek revenge in the first Golden Axe game. Her magic attacks are all fire-based, including the summoning of a giant, flame-spewing dragon. Tyris has the shortest range of the heroes, but possesses the most powerful spells.
- Gilius Thunderhead is a bearded dwarf who (at least in the arcade version) actually commands the Golden Axe. He wears a green tunic, leather boots, and a horned helmet. He seeks revenge in Golden Axe after his brother is murdered by Death Adder's forces, returning to defeat Dark Guld in Golden Axe II. In Golden Axe III, Gilius is the only character from the previous games to appear; though he is not playable, he starts each of the characters off on their quest at the game's beginning. When Death Adder returns from the dead in Golden Axe: The Revenge of Death Adder, Gilius rides on the back of playable character Goah throughout the game, and sacrifices his life at the game's end to vanquish Death Adder once and for all. Gilius is granted the least powerful spells in the game, but has the best striking range in battle. Gillius is a recurring playable character in the Sega SuperStars series.
- Death Adder is a tyrannical giant who wears a full iron helmet, pointed spaulders, and wields an enormous double axe. In addition to his brutal strength and speed while attacking, he can also cast magical spells. With his army, he enslaves the kingdom of Golden Axe and kidnaps its royal family. After dispatching his minions, Adder is finally killed by the game's three heroes, but is resurrected for Golden Axe: The Revenge of Death Adder. Here, he survives an initial attempt on his life but perishes due to the self-sacrifice of Gilius Thunderhead. Death Adder reappears many years later in Golden Axe: The Duel, where he is a playable character and the penultimate boss. In 2010, IGN ranked Death Adder 83rd in "Top 100 Videogames Villains".
- In home console versions of Golden Axe, Death Adder is accompanied by his son, Death Adder Jr., and father, Death Bringer. These characters are palette swaps of the original Death Adder sprite, with similar powers and abilities. In the Genesis sequels, Golden Axe II and Golden Axe III, Death Adder's role is filled by Dark Guld and Damud Hellstrike, both of whom bear a strong resemblance to Death Adder.

== Other appearances ==
The characters from the original Golden Axe have made cameo appearances in other Sega games. Ax Battler, Gilius Thunderhead, and Tyris Flare all make a cameo appearance in the arcade version of Alien Storm. They can be found on one of the in-game television screens; a Golden Axe logo can also be seen during that cameo. Gilius Thunderhead makes another cameo appearance in the game, as part of a panel of judges rating the player's score.

Gilius Thunderhead is also a playable character in Sega Superstars Tennis and Sonic & All-Stars Racing Transformed. The latter also features a racetrack inspired by Golden Axe called "Adder's Lair". Ax Battler and Tyris Flare are available as playable characters in the Easy Mode of the Sega Ages 2500 version of Dynamite Deka. Death Adder also makes an appearance as one of the game's bosses.

Chickenleg, the pink cockatrice with the tail lash from the first game, first appeared as an enemy in Altered Beast.

== In other media ==
=== Film and TV projects ===
In 2014, Sega formed the production company Stories International and teamed up with Evan Cholfin for film and TV projects based on their games, with Golden Axe as an animated project with Universal Studios which planned to develop it as a movie or TV series. The project never got off the ground. On April 17, 2024, it was revealed that a comedic animated series based on the games was in development that was originally going to be on Comedy Central; the series features Liam McIntyre as Ax Battler, Lisa Gilroy as Tyris Flare, Matthew Rhys as Gillius Thunderhead, Carl Tart as Chronos "Evil" Lait, and Danny Pudi as a new character called Hampton Squib. The series was released on September 16, 2026 on Paramount+. The series is produced by CBS Studios and Sony Pictures Television with Titmouse, Inc. as the animation studio. Chris Westlake announced that he would be composing the score.

Gilius makes frequent appearances in the 2014 anime Hi-sCoool! SeHa Girls, alongside other SEGA characters. Of the cameo characters, Gilius notably appears and is referenced more often than some of the others.

=== Comics ===
Golden Axe was featured in the British comic Sonic the Comic, which was published by Fleetway. The series was titled "The Legend of the Golden Axe" and had two six-issue runs, written by Mark Eyles and illustrated by Mike White. Issues 1–6 feature the story "Citadel of Dead Souls", wherein a necromancer attempts to resurrect Dark Guld. Issues 13–18 have the story "Plague of Serpents", which involves a snake-charmer named Cobraxis kidnapping the Queen of Gilius' dwarf race. Both stories take place in the aftermath of Golden Axe II.

Characters from Golden Axe would later appear in the Worlds Unite crossover from Archie Comics alongside several other Sega and Capcom franchises.

=== Toys ===
Storm Collectibles has created a series of detailed 6" collectible action figures from the franchise.
