= List of Sega video games =

The following is a list of video games developed and published by Sega. Included are all games published on their own platforms as well as platforms made by other manufacturers and PC. It does not include games made by third parties on Sega's platforms. Also included are games licensed by Sega, where they are involved as an IP holder but not otherwise. The corresponding year of each game refers to its original release year, localizations of titles can release years later.

- For games released on Sega's platforms see List of SG-1000 games, List of Master System games, List of Sega Genesis games, List of Game Gear games, List of Mega-CD games, List of 32X games, List of Sega Saturn games and List of Dreamcast games
- For games released on Sega's arcade platforms see List of Sega arcade games
- For games released on mobile platforms see List of Sega mobile games
- For a list of franchises see List of Sega video game franchises
- For a list of games developed and published by Sega subsidiary Atlus, see List of Atlus games
- For a list of Sega development studios, see List of Sega development studios

== Developed or published by Sega ==
Year	Title	Genre(s)	Developer(s)	System(s)	JP	NA	EU	Ref.
1983	Borderline	Shoot-'em-Up	Sega, Compile	SG-1000	Yes		Yes	
1983	Buck Rogers: Planet of Zoom	Shoot-'em-Up	Gremlin Industries	Apple II		Yes		
1983	Buck Rogers: Planet of Zoom	Shoot-'em-Up	Gremlin Industries	Atari 2600		Yes	Yes	
1983	Buck Rogers: Planet of Zoom	Shoot-'em-Up	Gremlin Industries	Atari 5200		Yes		
1983	Buck Rogers: Planet of Zoom	Shoot-'em-Up	Gremlin Industries	Commodore 64		Yes	Yes	
1983	Buck Rogers: Planet of Zoom	Shoot-'em-Up	Gremlin Industries	VIC-20		Yes		
1983	Champion Tennis	Sports	Sega	SG-1000	Yes		Yes	
1983	Congo Bongo	Action	Sega, Ikegami Tsushinki	Atari 2600		Yes	Yes	
1983	Congo Bongo	Action	Sega, Ikegami Tsushinki	Atari 5200		Yes		
1983	Congo Bongo	Action	Sega, Ikegami Tsushinki	Commodore 64		Yes	Yes	
1983	Congo Bongo	Action	Sega, Ikegami Tsushinki	VIC-20		Yes		
1983	Congo Bongo	Action	Sega, Ikegami Tsushinki	MSX			Yes	
1983	Congo Bongo	Action	Sega, Ikegami Tsushinki	SG-1000	Yes		Yes	
1983	Exerion	Shoot-'em-Up	Sega, Jaleco	SG-1000	Yes		Yes	
1983	N-Sub	Shoot-'em-Up	Compile	SG-1000	Yes		Yes	
1983	Orguss	Shoot-'em-Up	Sega	SG-1000			Yes	
1983	Pacar	Action	Sega	SG-1000	Yes		Yes	
1983	Safari Hunting (Tranquilizer Gun)	Shoot-'em-Up	Compile	SG-1000	Yes		Yes	
1983	Champion Baseball	Sports	ADK	SG-1000	Yes		Yes	
1983	Champion Golf	Sports	Sega, Logitec	SG-1000	Yes		Yes	
1983	Pop Flamer	Action	Sega, Jaleco	SG-1000	Yes			
1983	Sega Flipper	Action	Sega	SG-1000	Yes		Yes	
1983	Sindbad Mystery	Puzzle	Sega	SG-1000	Yes		Yes	
1983	Sub Scan	Action	Sega	SG-1000		Yes		
1983	Space Slalom	Action	Orca, Sega	SG-1000	Yes			
1983	Star Jacker	Shoot-'em-Up	Sega	SG-1000	Yes		Yes	
1983	Star Trek: Strategic Operations Simulator	Shoot-'em-Up	Gremlin Industries	Atari 2600		Yes		
1983	Star Trek: Strategic Operations Simulator	Shoot-'em-Up	Gremlin Industries	Atari 5200		Yes		
1983	Star Trek: Strategic Operations Simulator	Shoot-'em-Up	Gremlin Industries	Apple II		Yes		
1983	Star Trek: Strategic Operations Simulator	Shoot-'em-Up	Gremlin Industries	Atari 8-bit		Yes		
1983	Star Trek: Strategic Operations Simulator	Shoot-'em-Up	Gremlin Industries	Commodore 64		Yes		
1983	Sega Galaga	Shoot-'em-Up	Sega, Namco	SG-1000	Yes			
1983	Spy Hunter	Action	Bally Midway, Sega	Atari 2600		Yes		
1983	Spy Hunter	Action	Bally Midway, Sega	Atari 8-bit		Yes		
1983	Spy Hunter	Action	Bally Midway, Sega	Commodore 64		Yes		
1983	Spy Hunter	Action	Bally Midway, Sega	IBM PC		Yes		
1983	Tac/Scan	Shoot-'em-Up	Sega	Atari 2600		Yes		
1983	Thunderground	Shoot-em-Up	Sega	Atari 2600		Yes	Yes	
1983	Pachinko	Puzzle	Sega	SG-1000	Yes			
1983	Serizawa Hachidan no Tsumeshogi	Table	Sega	SG-1000	Yes			
1983	Yamato	Shoot-'em-Up	Sega	SG-1000	Yes		Yes	
1983	Zippy Race	Racing	Sega, Irem	SG-1000	Yes			
1984	Champion Boxing	Sports	Sega	SG-1000	Yes		Yes	
1984	Champion Soccer	Sports	Sega	SG-1000	Yes		Yes	
1984	Flicky	Action	Sega	SG-1000	Yes		Yes	
1984	Home Mahjong	Table	Sega	SG-1000	Yes			
1984	Lode Runner	Action	Compile, Broderbund	SG-1000	Yes		Yes	
1984	Safari Race	Racing	Sega	SG-1000	Yes		Yes	
1984	Tapper	Action	Bally Midway	Apple II		Yes		
1984	Tapper	Action	Bally Midway	Atari 2600		Yes		
1984	Tapper	Action	Bally Midway	Amstrad CPC			Yes	
1984	Tapper	Action	Bally Midway	BBC Micro			Yes	
1984	Tapper	Action	Bally Midway	Commodore 64		Yes	Yes	
1984	Tapper	Action	Bally Midway	ZX Spectrum			Yes	
1984	Girl's Garden	Action	Sega	SG-1000		Yes		
1984	Golgo 13	Shoot-'em-Up	Sega	SG-1000	Yes			
1984	Hustle Chumy	Action	Compile	SG-1000	Yes			
1984	Pachinko II	Puzzle	Sega	SG-1000	Yes			
1984	Up'n Down	Racing	Sega	Apple II		Yes		
1984	Up'n Down	Racing	Sega	Atari 2600		Yes		
1984	Up'n Down	Racing	Sega	Atari 8-bit		Yes	Yes	
1984	Up'n Down	Racing	Sega	Colecovision		Yes		
1984	Up'n Down	Racing	Sega	Commodore 64		Yes	Yes	
1984	Up'n Down	Racing	Sega	IBM PC		Yes		
1984	Zaxxon	Shoot-'em-Up	Sega	Atari 5200		Yes		
1985	Bank Panic	Action	Sanritsu	SG-1000	Yes			
1985	Bomb Jack	Action	Sega Tehkan	SG-1000				
1985	C_So!	Action	Sega, Compile	SG-1000	Yes			
1985	Comical Machine Gun Joe	Action	Sega	Master System	Yes			
1985	Chack'n Pop	Action	Taito, Sega	SG-1000	Yes			
1985	Champion Ice Hockey	Sports	Sega	SG-1000	Yes			
1985	Championship Lode Runner	Action	Broderbund, Sega	SG-1000	Yes			
1985	Choplifter	Action	Broderbund, Sega	SG-1000	Yes			
1985	Doki Doki Penguin Land	Puzzle	Sega	SG-1000	Yes			
1985	Dragon Wang	Action	Sega	SG-1000	Yes			
1985	Drol	Action	Broderbund, Sega	SG-1000	Yes			
1985	Elevator Action	Action	Taito, Sega	SG-1000	Yes			
1985	GP World	Racing	Sega	SG-1000	Yes			
1985	Great Soccer	Sports	Sega	Master System	Yes		Yes	
1985	H.E.R.O.	Action	Activision, Sega	SG-1000	Yes			
1985	Hang-On	Racing	Sega	Master System	Yes		Yes	
1985	Hang-On II	Racing	Sega	SG-1000	Yes			
1985	Hyper Sports	Sports	Konami, Sega	Master System	Yes			
1985	Pitfall II: The Lost Caverns	Action	Activision, Sega	SG-1000	Yes			
1985	Pit Pot	Action	Sega	Master System	Yes			
1985	Satellite 7	Shoot-'em-Up	Sega	Master System	Yes			
1985	Shinnyuushain Tooru-Kun	Action	Konami, Sega	SG-1000	Yes			
1985	Space Invaders	Shoot-'em-Up	Taito, Sega	SG-1000	Yes			
1985	Star Force	Shoot-'em-Up	Tehkan, Sega	SG-1000	Yes			
1985	Soukoban	Puzzle	Sega, Thinking Rabbit	SG-1000	Yes			
1985	Teddy Boy	Action	Sega	Master System	Yes	Yes	Yes	
1985	TransBot	Shoot-'em-Up	Sega	Master System	Yes	Yes	Yes	
1985	Othello	Table	Sega, Tsukada Original	SG-1000	Yes			
1985	Zaxxon	Shoot-'em-Up	Sega	SG-1000	Yes			
1985	Zoom 909	Shoot-'em-Up	Sega	SG-1000	Yes			
1986	Astro Warrior	Shoot-'em-Up	Sega	Master System	Yes	Yes		
1986	Action Fighter	Vehicular Combat	Sega	Master System	Yes	Yes	Yes	
1986	Alex Kidd in Miracle World	Platform	Sega	Master System	Yes	Yes	Yes	
1986	Black Belt	Action	Sega	Master System	Yes	Yes	Yes	
1986	Champion Billiards	Sports	Compile	SG-1000	Yes			
1986	Champion Kendou	Sports	Sega	SG-1000	Yes			
1986	Choplifter	Action	Broderbund, Sega	Master System		Yes	Yes	
1986	F-16 Fighting Falcon	Shoot-'em-Up	Nexa, Sega	Master System		Yes	Yes	
1986	Fantasy Zone	Shoot-'em-Up	Sega	Master System	Yes	Yes	Yes	
1986	Ghost House	Action	Sega	Master System	Yes	Yes	Yes	
1986	Great Ice Hockey	Sports	Sega	Master System	Yes	Yes		
1986	Gulkave	Shoot-'em-Up	Compile	SG-1000	Yes			
1986	High School! Kimengumi	Adventure	Sega	Master System	Yes			
1986	Marksman Shooting & Trap Shooting	Shoot-'em-Up	Sega	Master System		Yes		
1986	My Hero	Action	Sega	Master System	Yes	Yes	Yes	
1986	Ninja Princess	Action	Sega	SG-1000	Yes			
1986	Ninja Princess	Action	Sega	Master System	Yes	Yes	Yes	
1986	Pro Wrestling	Sports	Sega	Master System	Yes	Yes	Yes	
1986	Safari Hunt	Shoot-'em-Up	Sega	Master System		Yes	Yes	
1986	Secret Command	Shoot-'em-Up	Sega	Master System	Yes	Yes	Yes	
1986	Space Harrier	Shooting	Sega	Master System	Yes	Yes	Yes	
1986	Spy vs. Spy	Action	Sega, First Star Software Inc.	Master System	Yes	Yes	Yes	
1986	Sukeban Deka II	Action	Sega	Master System	Yes			
1986	Super Tank	Action	Sega	SG-1000	Yes			
1986	The Castle	Action	Sega, ASCII	SG-1000	Yes			
1986	Terebi Oekaki	Action	Sega	SG-1000	Yes			
1986	Wonder Boy	Action	Sega	SG-1000	Yes			
1986	World Grand Prix	Racing	Sega	SG-1000	Yes	Yes	Yes	
1987	After Burner	Shoot-'em-Up	Sega	Master System	Yes	Yes	Yes	
1987	Alex Kidd BMX Trial	Racing	Sega	Master System	Yes			
1987	Alien Syndrome	Action	Sega	Master System	Yes	Yes	Yes	
1987	Aztec Adventure: The Golden Road to Paradise	Action	Sega	Master System	Yes	Yes	Yes	
1987	Enduro Racer	Racing	Sega	Master System	Yes	Yes	Yes	
1987	Fantasy Zone II: The Tears of Opa-Opa	Shoot-'em-Up	Sega	Master System	Yes	Yes	Yes	
1987	Fantasy Zone: The Maze	Action	Sega	Master System	Yes	Yes	Yes	
1987	Gangster Town	Shoot-'em-Up	Sega	Master System		Yes	Yes	
1987	Ghostbusters	Action	Compile, Activision	Master System	Yes	Yes	Yes	
1987	Great Basketball	Sports	Sega	Master System	Yes	Yes	Yes	
1987	Great Football	Sports	Sega	Master System	Yes	Yes	Yes	
1987	Great Golf	Sports	Sega	Master System	Yes			
1987	Great Volleyball	Sports	Sega	Master System	Yes	Yes	Yes	
1987	Kung Fu Kid	Action	Sega	Master System	Yes	Yes	Yes	
1987	Mahjong Sengoku Jidai	Table	Sanritsu	Master System	Yes			
1987	Missile Defense 3-D	Shoot-'em-Up	Sega	Master System		Yes	Yes	
1987	Monopoly	Table	Sega	Master System		Yes	Yes	
1987	Loretta no Shouzou: Sherlock Holmes	Adventure	Sega	SG-1000	Yes			
1987	Out Run	Racing	Sega	Master System	Yes	Yes	Yes	
1987	Parlour games	Table	Compile	Master System	Yes	Yes	Yes	
1987	Penguin Land	Puzzle	Sega	Master System	Yes	Yes	Yes	
1987	Phantasy Star	RPG	Sega	Master System	Yes	Yes	Yes	
1987	Quartet	Action	Sega	Master System	Yes	Yes	Yes	
1987	Rocky	Sports	Sega	Master System	Yes	Yes	Yes	
1987	SDI: Strategic Defense Initiative	Shoot-'em-Up	Sega	Master System	Yes	Yes	Yes	
1987	Shooting Gallery	Shoot-'em-Up	Sega	Master System		Yes	Yes	
1987	The Black Onyx	RPG	Sega	Master System	Yes			
1987	The Pro Yakyuu: Pennant Race	Sports	Sega	Master System	Yes			
1987	Woody Pop	Action	Sega	Master System	Yes			
1987	Wonder Boy	Action	Westone	Master System	Yes	Yes	Yes	
1987	World Soccer	Sports	Sega	Master System	Yes	Yes	Yes	
1987	Zaxxon 3D	Shoot-'em-Up	Sega	Master System	Yes	Yes	Yes	
1987	Zillion	Action-adventure	Sega	Master System	Yes	Yes	Yes	
1987	Zillion II: The Tri Formation	Action	Sega	Master System	Yes	Yes	Yes	
1988	After Burner	Shoot-'em-Up	Weebee Games	Amiga		Yes	Yes	
1988	After Burner	Shoot-'em-Up	Weebee Games	Commodore 64		Yes	Yes	
1988	After Burner	Shoot-'em-Up	Unlimited Software	IBM PC		Yes	Yes	
1988	Alex Kidd: The Lost Stars	Platform	Sega	Master System	Yes	Yes	Yes	
1988	Altered Beast	Action	Sega	Genesis		Yes	Yes	
1988	American Baseball	Sports	Sega	Master System		Yes	Yes	
1988	Blade Eagle	Shoot-'em-Up	Sega	Master System	Yes	Yes	Yes	
1988	Captain Silver	Action	Data East, Sega	Master System	Yes	Yes	Yes	
1988	Cyborg Hunter	Action	Sega	Master System	Yes	Yes	Yes	
1988	Galactic Protector	Shoot-'em-Up	Sega	Master System	Yes			
1988	Golvellius: Valley of Doom	RPG	Compile	Master System	Yes	Yes	Yes	
1988	Hoshi wo Sagashite...	Adventure	Sega	Master System	Yes			
1988	Kenseiden	Action RPG	Sega	Master System	Yes	Yes	Yes	
1988	Line of Fire	Shoot-'em-Up	Sanritsu	Master System			Yes	
1988	Lord of the Sword	RPG	Sega	Master System	Yes	Yes	Yes	
1988	Maze Hunter 3D	Action	Sega	Master System	Yes	Yes	Yes	
1988	Megumi Rescue	Action	Sega, Aicom	Master System	Yes			
1988	Miracle Warriors: Seal of the Dark Lord	RPG	Sega, Kogado Studio	Master System	Yes	Yes	Yes	
1988	Nekkyuu Koushien	Sports	Sega	Master System	Yes			
1988	R-Type	Shoot-'em-Up	Irem, Compile	Master System	Yes	Yes	Yes	
1988	Rambo III	Action	Sega	Master System		Yes	Yes	
1988	Rescue Mission	Shoot-'em-Up	Sega	Master System		Yes	Yes	
1988	Shanghai	Table	Activision, Sega	Master System		Yes	Yes	
1988	Shinobi	Action	Sega	Master System	Yes	Yes	Yes	
1988	Space Harrier 3D	Rail shooter	Sega	Master System	Yes	Yes	Yes	
1988	Space Harrier II	Rail shooter	Sega	Genesis	Yes	Yes	Yes	
1988	SpellCaster	Action RPG	Sega	Master System	Yes	Yes	Yes	
1988	Super Racing	Racing	Sega	Master System	Yes			
1988	Super Hang-On	Racing	Sega	Genesis	Yes	Yes	Yes	
1988	Super Thunder Blade	Rail shooter	Sega	Genesis	Yes	Yes	Yes	
1988	Tensai Bakabon	Adventure	Sega	Master System	Yes			
1988	Thunder Blade	Rail shooter	Sega	Master System	Yes	Yes	Yes	
1988	Osomatsu-kun Hachamecha Gekijou	Action	Sega	Genesis	Yes			
1988	Wonder Boy in Monster Land	Action	Westone	Master System	Yes	Yes	Yes	
1988	Ys: The Vanished Omens	Action RPG	Falcom, Sega	Master System	Yes	Yes	Yes	
1989	Alex Kidd: High-Tech World	Adventure	Sega	Master System	Yes	Yes	Yes	
1989	Alex Kidd in the Enchanted Castle	Platform	Sega	Genesis	Yes	Yes	Yes	
1989	Alf	Adventure	Sega	Master System		Yes		
1989	Altered Beast	Action	Sega	Master System		Yes	Yes	
1989	Altered Beast	Action	Unlimited Software	IBM PC			Yes	
1989	American Pro Football	Sports	Sega	Master System		Yes	Yes	
1989	Arnold Palmer Tournament Golf	Sports	Sega	Genesis	Yes	Yes	Yes	
1989	Basketball Nightmare	Sports	Sega	Master System			Yes	
1989	Battle OutRun	Racing	Sega	Master System			Yes	
1989	Bomber Raid	Shoot-'em-Up	Sega	Master System	Yes	Yes	Yes	
1989	California Games	Sports	Epyx, Sega	Master System		Yes	Yes	
1989	Casino Games	Gambling	Sega	Master System		Yes	Yes	
1989	Cloud Master	Shoot-'em-Up	Opera House	Master System		Yes	Yes	
1989	Dead Angle	Shoot-'em-Up	Seibu Kaihatsu, Sega	Master System		Yes	Yes	
1989	Forgotten Worlds	Shoot-'em-Up	Capcom, Sega	Genesis	Yes	Yes	Yes	
1989	Galaxy Force	Rail shooter	Sega	Master System		Yes	Yes	
1989	Ghouls 'n Ghosts	Platform	Capcom, Sega	Genesis	Yes	Yes	Yes	
1989	Golden Axe	Action	Sega	Master System		Yes	Yes	
1989	Golden Axe	Action	Sega	Genesis	Yes	Yes	Yes	
1989	Herzog Zwei	RTS	Technosoft	Genesis	Yes	Yes	Yes	
1989	OutRun 3D	Racing	Sega	Master System			Yes	
1989	Psycho Fox	Platform	Vic Tokai	Master System		Yes	Yes	
1989	Poseidon Wars 3D	Shoot-'em-Up	Sega	Master System		Yes	Yes	
1989	Last Battle	Action	Sega	Genesis	Yes	Yes	Yes	
1989	Mystic Defender	Action	Sega	Genesis	Yes	Yes		
1989	Phantasy Star II	RPG	Sega	Genesis	Yes	Yes	Yes	
1989	Rambo III	Action	Sega	Genesis	Yes	Yes	Yes	
1989	Rampage	Action	Activision, Sega	Master System		Yes	Yes	
1989	Scramble Spirits	Shoot-'em-Up	Sega	Master System			Yes	
1989	Super Daisenryaku	Strategy	Systemsoft, Sega	Genesis	Yes			
1989	Ace Tennis	Sports	Sims	Master System			Yes	
1989	Tetris	Puzzle	Sega	Genesis	Yes			
1989	Tommy Lasurda Baseball	Sports	Sega	Genesis	Yes	Yes	Yes	
1989	The Revenge of Shinobi	Action	Sega	Genesis	Yes	Yes	Yes	
1989	Thunderforce II	Shoot-'em-Up	Technosoft	Genesis	Yes	Yes	Yes	
1989	Time Soldiers	Shoot-'em-Up	Alpha Denshi, SNK	Master System		Yes	Yes	
1989	Truxton	Shoot-'em-Up	Toaplan	Genesis	Yes	Yes	Yes	
1989	Vigilante	Action	Irem, Sega	Master System		Yes	Yes	
1989	Wanted	Shoot-'em-Up	Sanritsu	Master System		Yes	Yes	
1989	Wonder Boy III: The Dragon's Trap	Platform	Westone	Master System		Yes	Yes	
1989	World Cup Soccer	Sports	Sega	Genesis			Yes	
1990	Alex Kidd in Shinobi World	Platform	Sega	Master System		Yes	Yes	
1990	Altered Beast	Action	Activision	Amiga		Yes	Yes	
1990	Altered Beast	Action	Activision	Commodore 64		Yes	Yes	
1990	Arrow Flash	Shoot-'em-Up	I.T.L.	Genesis	Yes	Yes	Yes	
1990	Assault City	Rail shooter	Sanritsu	Master System		Yes	Yes	
1990	Castle of Illusion Starring Mickey Mouse	Platform	Sega	Genesis	Yes	Yes	Yes	
1990	Crack Down	Action	HOT-B, Sega	Genesis	Yes	Yes	Yes	
1990	Columns	Puzzle	Sega	Genesis	Yes	Yes	Yes	
1990	Columns	Puzzle	Sega	Game Gear	Yes	Yes	Yes	
1990	CyberBall	Sports	Sega, Tengen	Genesis	Yes	Yes	Yes	
1990	Darwin 4081	Shoot-'em-Up	Sega, Date East	Genesis	Yes			
1990	Dragon Crystal	Action RPG	Sega	Game Gear	Yes	Yes	Yes	
1990	Dynamite Duke	Action	Hertz, Seibu Kahatsu	Genesis	Yes	Yes	Yes	
1990	Dynamite Düx	Action	Sega	Master System			Yes	
1990	DJ Boy	Action	Sega, Interstate, Kaneko	Genesis	Yes	Yes	Yes	
1990	E-SWAT	Action	Sanritsu	Master System		Yes	Yes	
1990	ESWAT: City Under Siege	Action	Sega	Genesis	Yes	Yes	Yes	
1990	Double Hawk	Shoot-'em-Up	Sanritsu, Opera House	Master System			Yes	
1990	Dynamite Duke	Rail shooter	Hertz, Seibu Kahatsu	Genesis	Yes			
1990	Ghostbusters	Action	Compile	Genesis	Yes	Yes	Yes	
1990	Golden Axe	Action	Probe Software	Commodore 64		Yes	Yes	
1990	Golden Axe	Action	Probe Software	IBM PC		Yes	Yes	
1990	Golfamania	Sports	Sanritsu	Master System		Yes	Yes	
1990	Heavyweight Champ	Sports	Sims	Master System		Yes	Yes	
1990	James "Buster" Douglas Knockout Boxing	Sports	Sega, Taito	Genesis	Yes	Yes	Yes	
1990	Joe Montana Football	Sports	Park Place Productions	Genesis	Yes	Yes	Yes	
1990	Joe Montana Football	Sports	Sega	Master System		Yes	Yes	
1990	Michael Jackson's Moonwalker	Action	Sega	Genesis	Yes	Yes	Yes	
1990	Michael Jackson's Moonwalker	Action	Arc System Works	Master System		Yes	Yes	
1990	Phantasy Star III: Generations of Doom	RPG	Sega	Genesis	Yes	Yes	Yes	
1990	Shadow Dancer: The Secret of Shinobi	Action	Sega	Genesis	Yes	Yes	Yes	
1990	Slap Shot	Sports	Sanritsu	Master System		Yes	Yes	
1990	Strider	Action	Sega, Capcom	Genesis	Yes	Yes	Yes	
1990	Submarine Attack	Shoot-'em-Up	Sega	Master System		Yes	Yes	
1990	Summer Games	Sports	Zap, Sega, Epyx	Master System		Yes	Yes	
1990	Super Monaco GP	Racing	Sega	Genesis	Yes	Yes	Yes	
1990	Super Monaco GP	Racing	Sega	Game Gear	Yes	Yes	Yes	
1990	Super Monaco GP	Racing	Sega	Master System		Yes	Yes	
1990	Super Real Basketball	Sports	Sega	Genesis	Yes	Yes	Yes	
1990	Sorcerian	Action RPG	Sega, Falcom	Genesis	Yes			
1990	Taisen Mahjong HaoPai	Tabletop	Arc System Works, Sega	Game Gear	Yes			
1990	The Cyber Shinobi	Action	Sega	Master System			Yes	
1990	Twin Hawk	Shoot-'em-Up	Toaplan, Sega	Genesis	Yes		Yes	
1990	Whip Rush	Shoot-'em-Up	Vic Tokai	Genesis	Yes			
1990	Wonder Boy	Platform	Sega	Game Gear	Yes	Yes	Yes	
1990	Wonder Boy III: Monster Lair	Platform	Sega	Genesis	Yes		Yes	
1990	Zoom!	Puzzle	Sega, Discovery Software	Genesis	Yes	Yes	Yes	
1990	World Games	Sports	Sega, Epyx	Master System			Yes	
1991	16t	Action	Sega	Genesis	Yes			
1991	688 Attack Sub	Strategy	Micropose, Electronic Arts	Genesis		Yes	Yes	
1991	Ace of Aces	Simulation	Artech Studios, Sega	Master System			Yes	
1991	Advanced Daisenryaku: Deutsch Dengeki Sakusen	Strategy	Sega, Systemsoft	Genesis	Yes			
1991	Alien Storm	Action	Sega	Genesis	Yes	Yes	Yes	
1991	Alien Storm	Action	Sega	Master System			Yes	
1991	Art Alive!	Educational	Farsight Technologies	Genesis	Yes	Yes	Yes	
1991	Astérix	Platform	Sega	Master System			Yes	
1991	Aworg: Hero In The Sky	Action	Sega	Genesis	Yes			
1991	Ax Battler: A Legend of Golden Axe	Action adventure	Aspect	Game Gear	Yes	Yes	Yes	
1991	Bahamut Senki	Strategy	Sega	Genesis	Yes			
1991	Battle Golfer Yui	Sports	Megasoft	Genesis	Yes			
1991	Bonanza Bros.	Action	Sega	Genesis	Yes	Yes	Yes	
1991	Castle of Illusion Starring Mickey Mouse	Platform	Aspect	Game Gear	Yes	Yes	Yes	
1991	Castle of Illusion Starring Mickey Mouse	Platform	Aspect	Master System		Yes	Yes	
1991	Clutch Hitter	Sports	Sega	Game Gear		Yes		
1991	Crystal Warriors	Strategy	Sega	Game Gear	Yes	Yes	Yes	
1991	Danan: The Jungle Fighter	Action	Whiteboard	Master System			Yes	
1991	Dick Tracy	Action	Sega Technical Institute	Genesis	Yes	Yes	Yes	
1991	Dick Tracy	Action	Sega Technical Institute	Master System		Yes	Yes	
1991	Dragon Crystal	RPG	Sega	Master System			Yes	
1991	Double Dragon	Action	Technos Japan, Arc System Works	Master System	Yes	Yes	Yes	
1991	Dynamite Duke	Action	Sega, Seibu Kahatsu	Master System			Yes	
1991	Eternal Legend	RPG	Sega	Game Gear	Yes			
1991	Fantasia	Platform	Infogrames	Genesis	Yes	Yes	Yes	
1991	Factory Panic	Puzzle	Sega	Game Gear	Yes		Yes	
1991	Fatal Labyrinth	RPG	Sega	Genesis	Yes	Yes	Yes	
1991	Funky Horror Band	RPG	Advance Communication Company	Sega CD	Yes			
1991	G-LOC: Air Battle	Rail shooter	Sega	Game Gear	Yes	Yes	Yes	
1991	Gain Ground	Action, Strategy	Sega	Genesis	Yes	Yes	Yes	
1991	Gain Ground	Action, Strategy	Sega	Master System			Yes	
1991	Galaxy Force II	Rail shooter	CRI, Sega	Genesis	Yes	Yes	Yes	
1991	Heavyweight Champ	Sports	Sims	Game Gear	Yes	Yes	Yes	
1991	Hyper Marbles	Action	Sega	Genesis	Yes			
1991	Fantasy Zone Gear	Shoot-'em-Up	Sanritsu	Game Gear	Yes	Yes	Yes	
1991	Flicky	Action	Sega	Genesis	Yes	Yes	Yes	
1991	Golden Axe II	Action	Sega	Genesis	Yes	Yes	Yes	
1991	Golden Axe Warrior	Action adventure	Sega	Master System		Yes	Yes	
1991	Ghouls 'n Ghosts	Action	Capcom, Sega	Master System	Yes	Yes	Yes	
1991	House of Tarot	Educational	Japan System Supply	Game Gear	Yes			
1991	Forgotten Worlds	Shoot-'em-Up	Capcom, Sega	Master System	Yes	Yes	Yes	
1991	Ikasuze! Koi no Doki Doki Penguin Land MD	Puzzle	Sega	Genesis	Yes			
1991	Jewel Master	Action adventure	Sega	Genesis	Yes	Yes	Yes	
1991	Joe Montana Football	Sports	Sega	Game Gear	Yes	Yes	Yes	
1991	Kinetic Connection	Puzzle	Sadato Teneda, Sega	Game Gear	Yes			
1991	Kiss Shot	Tabletop	Sega	Genesis	Yes			
1991	Kuni Chan no Game Tengoku	Tabletop	Sega	Game Gear	Yes			
1991	Laser Ghost	Rail shooter	Sega	Genesis			Yes	
1991	Mahjong Cop Ryuu: Shiro Ookami no Yabou	Tabletop	Megasoft	Genesis	Yes			
1991	Mario Lemieux Hockey	Sports	Ringler Studios	Genesis		Yes	Yes	
1991	M-1 Abrams Battle Tank	Simulation	Realtimes Games Software, Electronic Arts	Genesis		Yes	Yes	
1991	Mega Mind	Tabletop	Sega, Lazlo Olah	Genesis	Yes			
1991	Mercs	Shoot-'em-Up	Capcom, Sega	Genesis	Yes	Yes	Yes	
1991	Ninja Burai Densetsu	Strategy	Sega	Genesis	Yes			
1991	Ninja Gaiden	Action	Tecmo, Sega	Game Gear	Yes	Yes	Yes	
1991	Nikkan Sports Pro Yakyuu VAN	Sports	Sega	Genesis	Yes			
1991	Paddle Fighter	Sports	Sega	Genesis	Yes			
1991	Psychic World	Action	Hertz, Sega	Master System			Yes	
1991	Psychic World	Action	Hertz, Sega	Game Gear	Yes	Yes	Yes	
1991	Phantasy Star Gaiden	RPG	Sega	Game Gear	Yes			
1991	Phantasy Star II Text Adventures	Adventure	Sega	Game Gear	Yes			
1991	Putt & Putter	Sports	Sims	Game Gear	Yes	Yes	Yes	
1991	Putter Golf	Sports	Sega	Genesis	Yes			
1991	Pyramid Magic	Action	Sega	Genesis	Yes			
1991	Pyramid Magic II	Action	Sega	Genesis	Yes			
1991	Pyramid Magic Special	Action	Sega	Genesis	Yes			
1991	Quackshot	Platform	Sega	Genesis	Yes	Yes	Yes	
1991	Rent-A-Hero	RPG	Sega	Genesis	Yes			
1991	Riddle Wired	Tabletop	Sega	Genesis	Yes			
1991	Robot Battler	Action	Sega	Genesis	Yes			
1991	Running Battle	Action	Opera House	Master System			Yes	
1991	Sangokushi Retsuden: Ransei no Eiyuutachi	Strategy	Tose	Genesis	Yes			
1991	The Chessmaster	Tabletop	Sega	Game Gear		Yes	Yes	
1991	Shadow Dancer	Action	Sega	Genesis	Yes	Yes	Yes	
1991	Shining in the Darkness	RPG	Climax	Genesis	Yes	Yes	Yes	
1991	Sonic Eraser	Puzzle	Sega	Genesis				
1991	Sonic the Hedgehog	Platform	Sega (Sonic Team)	Genesis	Yes	Yes	Yes	
1991	Sonic the Hedgehog (8-bit video game)	Platform	Ancient	Game Gear	Yes	Yes	Yes	
1991	Sonic the Hedgehog (8-bit video game)	Platform	Ancient	Master System		Yes	Yes	
1991	Space Harrier	Rail shooter	Sega	Game Gear	Yes	Yes	Yes	
1991	Spider-Man vs. The Kingpin	Action	Technopop	Genesis	Yes	Yes	Yes	
1991	Spider-Man vs. The Kingpin	Action	Technopop	Master System		Yes	Yes	
1991	Streets of Rage	Action	Sega	Genesis	Yes	Yes	Yes	
1991	Streets of Rage	Action	Ancient	Game Gear	Yes	Yes	Yes	
1991	Strider	Action	Tiertex, Capcom	Master System			Yes	
1991	Super Volleyball	Sports	Khaos	Genesis	Yes	Yes		
1991	Taiheiki	Strategy	Tose	Genesis				
1991	Teddy Boy Blues	Platform	Sega	Genesis	Yes			
1991	The GG Shinobi	Action	Sega	Game Gear	Yes	Yes	Yes	
1991	The Pro Yakyuu '91	Sports	Sega	Game Gear	Yes			
1991	The Lucky Dime Caper Starring Donald Duck	Platform	Aspect	Game Gear			Yes	
1991	The Lucky Dime Caper Starring Donald Duck	Platform	Aspect	Master System	Yes	Yes	Yes	
1991	ToeJam & Earl	Action	Johnson Voorsanger Productions	Genesis	Yes	Yes	Yes	
1991	Out Run	Driving	Dempa	Game Gear	Yes		Yes	
1991	Out Run	Driving	Dempa	Genesis	Yes	Yes	Yes	
1991	Wonder Boy in Monster World	Action	Westone	Genesis	Yes	Yes	Yes	
1991	Woody Pop	Puzzle	Sega	Game Gear	Yes		Yes	
1991	Wrestle War	Sports	Sega	Genesis	Yes		Yes	
1992	Aerial Assault	Shoot em' up	Sega	Game Gear	Yes	Yes	Yes	
1992	Aerial Assault	Shoot em' up	Sega	Master System		Yes	Yes	
1992	After Burner III	Rail shooter	CRI	Sega CD	Yes	Yes	Yes	
1992	Alien Syndrome	Action	Sims	Game Gear	Yes		Yes	
1992	Alisia Dragoon	Platform	Game Arts	Genesis	Yes	Yes	Yes	
1992	A Ressha de Ikou MD	Simulation	MNM Software, Artdink	Genesis	Yes			
1992	Ariel the Little Mermaid	Action	BlueSky Software	Genesis		Yes	Yes	
1992	Ariel the Little Mermaid	Action	BlueSky Software	Game Gear		Yes	Yes	
1992	Ariel the Little Mermaid	Action	BlueSky Software	Master System		Yes	Yes	
1992	Arslan Senki	RPG	Sega	Sega CD	Yes			
1992	Ayrton Senna's Super Monaco GP II	Racing	Sega	Genesis	Yes	Yes	Yes	
1992	Ayrton Senna's Super Monaco GP II	Racing	Sega	Game Gear		Yes	Yes	
1992	Ayrton Senna's Super Monaco GP II	Racing	Sega	Master System	Yes	Yes	Yes	
1992	Batman Returns	Action	Malibu Interactive	Genesis	Yes	Yes	Yes	
1992	Batman Returns	Action	Aspect	Game Gear	Yes	Yes	Yes	
1992	Bio-Hazard Battle	Shoot em' up	Sega	Genesis	Yes	Yes	Yes	
1992	Burai: Hachigyoku no Yuushi Densetsu	RPG	Sega, Riverhillsoft	Sega CD	Yes			
1992	California Games	Sports	Novotrade, Epyx	Genesis		Yes	Yes	
1992	Chakan: The Forever Man	Platform	Extended Play Productions	Genesis		Yes	Yes	
1992	Chakan: The Forever Man	Platform	Paul Hutchison	Game Gear		Yes	Yes	
1992	Chiki Chiki Boys	Action	Sega, Capcom	Genesis	Yes	Yes	Yes	
1992	David Robinson's Supreme Court	Sports	Acme Interactive	Genesis	Yes	Yes	Yes	
1992	Defenders of Oasis	RPG	Sega	Game Gear	Yes	Yes	Yes	
1992	Dungeons & Dragons: Warriors of the Eternal Sun	RPG	Westwood Associates	Genesis		Yes	Yes	
1992	Ecco the Dolphin	Action	Novotrade	Genesis	Yes	Yes	Yes	
1992	Evander Holyfield's "Real Deal" Boxing	Sports	ACME Interactive	Genesis	Yes	Yes	Yes	
1992	Evander Holyfield's "Real Deal" Boxing	Sports	Novotrade	Game Gear		Yes	Yes	
1992	Ex-Mutants	Action	Malibu Interactive	Genesis		Yes	Yes	
1992	Gambler Jiko Chuushinha	Tabletop	Sega	Game Gear	Yes			
1992	Greendog: The Beached Surfer Dude	Platform	Interactive Designs	Genesis		Yes	Yes	
1992	G-LOC: Air Battle	Rail shooter	Probe Software	Master System			Yes	
1992	Go Net	Tabletop	Aisystem Go	Genesis	Yes			
1992	Honoo no Toukyuuji Dodge Danpei	Sports	Sega	Genesis	Yes			
1992	Honoo no Toukyuuji Dodge Danpei	Sports	Sims	Game Gear	Yes			
1992	Hyokkori Hyoutanjima: Hyoutanjima no Daikoukai	Action	Sega	Genesis	Yes			
1992	Hyokkori Hyoutanjima: Hyoutanjima no Daikoukai	Action	Sega	Game Gear	Yes			
1992	Hyper Pro Yakyuu '92	Sports	Sega	Game Gear	Yes			
1992	Joe Montana II: Sports Talk Football	Sports	Sega	Genesis	Yes	Yes	Yes	
1992	Kid Chameleon	Platform	Sega Technical Institute	Genesis	Yes	Yes	Yes	
1992	Kuni Chan no Game Tengoku Part 2	Tabletop	Sega	Game Gear	Yes			
1992	King Colossus	RPG	Sega	Genesis	Yes			
1992	Landstalker: The Treasures of King Nole	RPG	Climax	Genesis	Yes	Yes	Yes	
1992	Lemmings	Probe Software	Probe Software, Psygnosis	Game Gear	Yes	Yes	Yes	
1992	Lemmings	Probe Software	Probe Software, Psygnosis	Master System			Yes	
1992	Magical Taruruto-kun	Game Freak	Game Freak	Genesis	Yes			
1992	Marky Mark and the Funky Bunch	Adventure	Digital Pictures	Sega CD		Yes		
1992	Master of Darkness	Action	Sims	Game Gear	Yes	Yes	Yes	
1992	Menacer 6-Game Cartridge	Action	Westwood Technologies	Genesis		Yes	Yes	
1992	Mercs	Shoot em' up	Capcom, Sega	Master System	Yes	Yes	Yes	
1992	NFL Sports Talk Football '93 Starring Joe Montana	Sports	BlueSky Software	Genesis		Yes	Yes	
1992	Ninja Gaiden	Action	Tecmo, Sega	Master System			Yes	
1992	Night Trap	Adventure	Digital Pictures	Sega CD	Yes	Yes	Yes	
1992	Pro Yakyuu Super League CD	Sports	Sega	Sega CD	Yes			
1992	Pengo	Puzzle	Coreland	Game Gear	Yes		Yes	
1992	Phantasy Star Adventure	Adventure	Sega	Game Gear	Yes			
1992	Puyo Puyo	Puzzle	Compile	Genesis	Yes			
1992	Quiz Scramble Special	Puzzle	Sega	Sega CD	Yes			
1992	Shining Force	Tactical RPG	Sonic Software Planning	Genesis	Yes	Yes	Yes	
1992	Shinobi II: The Silent Fury	Action	Sega	Game Gear	Yes	Yes	Yes	
1992	Shura no Mon	Strategy	Sims	Genesis	Yes			
1992	Spider-Man vs. The Kingpin	Action	B.I.T.S.	Game Gear		Yes	Yes	
1992	Sonic the Hedgehog 2	Platform	Sega	Genesis	Yes	Yes	Yes	
1992	Sonic the Hedgehog 2 (8-bit)	Platform	Aspect	Game Gear	Yes	Yes	Yes	
1992	Sonic the Hedgehog 2 (8-bit)	Platform	Aspect	Master System			Yes	
1992	Streets of Rage 2	Action	Ancient	Genesis	Yes	Yes	Yes	
1992	TaleSpin	Action	Disney, Sega	Genesis		Yes	Yes	
1992	The Majors: Pro Baseball	Sports	Sega	Game Gear		Yes		
1992	Thunder Force IV	Shoot em' up	Technosoft	Genesis	Yes	Yes	Yes	
1992	Tom & Jerry: The Movie	Platform	Sims	Master System			Yes	
1992	Toki: Going Ape Spit	Action	Santos, Tad Corporation	Genesis	Yes	Yes	Yes	
1992	Turbo OutRun	Racing	Sega	Genesis	Yes		Yes	
1992	Toxic Crusaders	Action	Infogrames	Genesis		Yes		
1992	Wimbledon	Sports	Sims	Genesis	Yes	Yes	Yes	
1992	Wimbledon	Sports	Sims	Game Gear	Yes	Yes	Yes	
1992	Wonder Boy III: The Dragon's Trap	Action	Westone	Game Gear	Yes		Yes	
1992	World of Illusion Starring Mickey Mouse and Donald Duck	Platform	Sega	Genesis	Yes	Yes	Yes	
1993	Aa Harimanada	Fighting	Megasoft	Genesis	Yes			
1993	Aa Harimanada	Fighting	Megasoft	Game Gear	Yes			
1993	Arslan Senki	RPG	Sega	Sega CD	Yes			
1993	Asterix and the Great Rescue	Platform	Core Design	Genesis		Yes	Yes	
1993	Asterix and the Secret Mission	Platform	Sega	Game Gear			Yes	
1993	Asterix and the Secret Mission	Platform	Sega	Master System			Yes	
1993	Barney's Hide & Seek Game	Educational	Realtime Associates	Genesis		Yes		
1993	Batman Returns	Action	Malibu Interactive	Sega CD		Yes	Yes	
1993	Batman Returns	Action	Aspect	Master System			Yes	
1993	Buggy Run	Racing	Sims	Master System			Yes	
1993	California Games II	Sports	Epyx	Genesis			Yes	
1993	California Games II	Sports	Epyx	Game Gear			Yes	
1993	California Games II	Sports	Epyx, Probe Software	Master System			Yes	
1993	Captain Planet and the Planeteers	Action	NovaLogic	Genesis			Yes	
1993	Columns III	Puzzle	Sega	Genesis	Yes	Yes		
1993	Chuck Rock II: Son of Chuck	Action	Core Design	Master System	Yes	Yes	Yes	
1993	Cyborg Justice	Action	Novotrade	Genesis		Yes	Yes	
1993	Dark Wizard	RPG	Sega	Sega CD	Yes	Yes		
1993	Deep Duck Trouble Starring Donald Duck	Platform	Aspect	Game Gear	Yes	Yes	Yes	
1993	Deep Duck Trouble Starring Donald Duck	Platform	Aspect	Master System			Yes	
1993	Desert Speedtrap starring Road Runner and Wile E. Coyote	Action	Probe Entertainment	Game Gear		Yes	Yes	
1993	Desert Speedtrap starring Road Runner and Wile E. Coyote	Action	Probe Entertainment	Master System			Yes	
1993	Dinosaurs for Hire	Action	Malibu Interactive	Genesis		Yes		
1993	Disney's Aladdin	Action	Virgin Games	Genesis	Yes	Yes	Yes	
1993	Dr. Robotnik's Mean Bean Machine	Puzzle	Compile	Genesis		Yes	Yes	
1993	Dr. Robotnik's Mean Bean Machine	Puzzle	Compile	Game Gear		Yes	Yes	
1993	Dracula Unleashed	Adventure	ICOM Unleashed	Sega CD		Yes	Yes	
1993	Doraemon Nora no Suke no Yabou	Action	Sega	Game Gear	Yes			
1993	Doraemon: Yume Dorobou to 7 Nin no Gozans	Action	G.Sat	Genesis	Yes			
1993	Double Switch	Adventure	Digital Pictures	Sega CD	Yes	Yes	Yes	
1993	Dynamic Country Club	Sports	Sega	Sega CD	Yes			
1993	Ecco the Dolphin	Action	Appaloosa Interactive	Game Gear	Yes	Yes	Yes	
1993	Ecco the Dolphin	Action	Appaloosa Interactive	Sega CD		Yes	Yes	
1993	Ecco the Dolphin	Action	Appaloosa Interactive	Master System			Yes	
1993	Egawa Suguru no Super League CD	Sports	Sega	Sega CD	Yes			
1993	Eternal Champions	Fighting	Sega Interactive	Genesis	Yes	Yes	Yes	
1993	Final Fight CD	Action	A-Wave, Capcom	Sega CD	Yes	Yes	Yes	
1993	G-LOC: Air Battle	Shoot em' up	Sega	Genesis	Yes	Yes	Yes	
1993	GP Rider	Racing	Sega	Master System			Yes	
1993	Greendog: The Beached Surfer Dude	Action	Interactive Designs	Game Gear		Yes	Yes	
1993	Golden Axe III	Action	Sega	Genesis	Yes	Yes	Yes	
1993	Gunstar Heroes	Action	Treasure	Genesis	Yes	Yes	Yes	
1993	Home Alone	Action	Brian A. Inc.	Game Gear		Yes	Yes	
1993	Home Alone	Action	Brian A. Inc.	Master System			Yes	
1993	Home Alone 2: Lost in New York	Action	Sega of America	Genesis		Yes		
1993	INXS	Interactive	Digital Pictures	Sega CD		Yes	Yes	
1993	J. League Pro Striker	Sports	Sega	Genesis	Yes			
1993	J.League Pro Striker Kanzenban	Sports	Sega	Genesis	Yes			
1993	Land of Illusion Starring Mickey Mouse	Platform	Sega	Game Gear	Yes	Yes	Yes	
1993	Land of Illusion Starring Mickey Mouse	Platform	Sega	Master System			Yes	
1993	Lemmings	Puzzle	Probe Software, Psygnosis	Game Gear	Yes	Yes	Yes	
1993	Madou Monogatari I: 3tsu no Madoukyuu	RPG	Compile	Game Gear	Yes			
1993	Mansion of Hidden Souls	Adventure	System Sacom	Sega CD	Yes			
1993	Masters of Combat	Action	Sims	Master System			Yes	
1993	McDonald's Treasure Land Adventure	Action	Treasure	Genesis	Yes	Yes	Yes	
1993	Mazin Saga	Action	Givro	Genesis	Yes			
1993	Mega Schwarzschild	Simulation	Kogado Studio	Sega CD	Yes			
1993	Metal Fangs	Action	Sega	Genesis	Yes			
1993	Nazo Puyo	Puzzle	Compile	Game Gear	Yes			
1993	Nazo Puyo 2	Puzzle	Compile	Game Gear	Yes			
1993	NFL Football '94 starring Joe Montana	Sports	BlueSky Software	Genesis	Yes	Yes		
1993	NFL's Greatest: San Francisco vs. Dallas 1978-1993	Sports	Park Place Productions	Sega CD		Yes		
1993	Janou Touryuumon	Simulation	Sega, Game Arts	Genesis	Yes			
1993	Joe Montana's NFL Football	Sports	Malibu Interactive	Sega CD		Yes		
1993	Jurassic Park	Action	BlueSky Software	Genesis	Yes	Yes	Yes	
1993	Jurassic Park	Action	Sega	Game Gear	Yes	Yes	Yes	
1993	Jurassic Park	Action	Sega	Master System			Yes	
1993	Jurassic Park	Adventure	Multimedia Studio	Sega CD	Yes	Yes	Yes	
1993	Panic!	Adventure	Sega	Sega CD	Yes	Yes		
1993	Party Quiz Mega Q	Puzzle	Sega	Genesis	Yes			
1993	Pebble Beach Golf Links	Sports	T&E Soft	Genesis	Yes	Yes	Yes	
1993	Phantasy Star IV: The End of the Millennium	RPG	Sega	Genesis	Yes	Yes	Yes	
1993	Pro Yakyuu GG League	Sports	Sega	Game Gear	Yes			
1993	Power Strike II	Sports	Compile	Game Gear	Yes			
1993	Puyo Puyo	Puzzle	Compile	Game Gear	Yes			
1993	Racing Aces	Racing	Hammond & Leyland	Sega CD		Yes		
1993	Ranger-X	Shoot em' up	Gau Entertainment	Genesis	Yes	Yes	Yes	
1993	Renegade	Action	Natsume, Taito	Master System			Yes	
1993	Richard Scarry's Busytown	Educational	Novotrade	Genesis		Yes		
1993	Sega Classics Arcade Collection	Compilation	Sega	Sega CD	Yes	Yes	Yes	
1993	Sega World Tournament Golf	Sports	Sega	Master System			Yes	
1993	Seima Densetsu 3×3 Eyes	RPG	Sega	Sega CD	Yes	Yes		
1993	Shining Force: The Sword of Hajya	Strategy	Sonic Software Planning	Game Gear	Yes	Yes		
1993	Shining Force II	Strategy	Sonic Software Planning	Genesis	Yes	Yes	Yes	
1993	Shinobi III: Return of the Ninja Master	Action	Sega, Megasoft	Genesis	Yes	Yes	Yes	
1993	SimEarth	Simulation	Game Arts, Marxis	Sega CD	Yes			
1993	Silpheed	Shoot em' up	Game Arts	Sega CD	Yes	Yes	Yes	
1993	Spider-Man vs. The Kingpin	Action	Foley High-Tech	Sega CD		Yes	Yes	
1993	Sonic Chaos	Platform	Aspect	Game Gear	Yes	Yes	Yes	
1993	Sonic Chaos	Platform	Aspect	Master System			Yes	
1993	Sonic Spinball	Action	Sega Technical Institute	Genesis	Yes	Yes	Yes	
1993	Sonic the Hedgehog CD	Platform	Sega	Sega CD	Yes	Yes	Yes	
1993	Surf Ninjas	Action	NuFX	Game Gear		Yes	Yes	
1993	Streets of Rage	Action	Ancient	Master System			Yes	
1993	Streets of Rage II	Action	Ancient	Game Gear	Yes	Yes	Yes	
1993	Taisen Mahjong HaoPai 2	Simulation	Arc System Works, Sega	Game Gear	Yes			
1993	TaleSpin	Action	Sega Interactive	Game Gear		Yes	Yes	
1993	Taz-Mania	Action	Sega	Game Gear			Yes	
1993	Tecmo World Cup '93	Sports	Sims, Tecmo	Master System			Yes	
1993	The Berenstain Bears' Camping Adventure	Action	Realtime Associates	Genesis		Yes		
1993	The Colors of Modern Rock	Miscallenious	Digital Pictures	Sega CD		Yes		
1993	The Flash	Platform	Sega	Master System			Yes	
1993	The Ren & Stimpy Show: Stimpy's Invention	Action	BlueSky Software	Genesis		Yes	Yes	
1993	The Ottifants	Action	Graftsgold	Genesis			Yes	
1993	The Ottifants	Action	Graftsgold	Game Gear			Yes	
1993	The Ottifants	Action	Graftsgold	Master System			Yes	
1993	ToeJam & Earl in Panic on Funkotron	Action	Johnson Voonsanger Productions	Genesis		Yes	Yes	
1993	Tom & Jerry: The Movie	Platform	Sims	Game Gear	Yes	Yes	Yes	
1993	Ultimate Soccer	Sports	Rage Software	Genesis			Yes	
1993	Ultimate Soccer	Sports	Rage Software	Game Gear	Yes		Yes	
1993	Ultimate Soccer	Sports	Rage Software	Master System			Yes	
1993	Warau Salesman	Adventure	Compile	Sega CD	Yes			
1993	Wimbledon 2	Sports	Sims	Master System			Yes	
1993	Wimbledon Championship Tennis	Sports	Sims	Genesis	Yes	Yes	Yes	
1993	World Series Baseball	Sports	Sega	Game Gear		Yes		
1993	X-Men	Action	Western Technologies	Genesis		Yes	Yes	
1994	After Armageddon Gaiden: Majuu Toushouden Eclipse	RPG	Micro Design	Sega CD	Yes			
1994	Art of Fighting	Fighting	SNK	Genesis	Yes	Yes	Yes	
1994	ATP Tour Championship Tennis	Sports	Sims	Master System		Yes	Yes	
1994	Astérix and the Great Rescue	Platform	Core Design	Game Gear		Yes	Yes	
1994	Astérix and the Great Rescue	Platform	Core Design	Master System			Yes	
1994	Body Count	Shooting	Probe Software	Genesis			Yes	
1994	Bonkers	Action	Sega Interactive	Genesis		Yes	Yes	
1994	Bonkers: Wax Up!	Action	Al Baker & Associates	Game Gear		Yes	Yes	
1994	Bouncers	Action	Dynamix	Sega CD		Yes		
1994	Clockwork Knight	Platform	Sega	Saturn	Yes	Yes	Yes	
1994	Crusader of Centy	RPG	Nextech	Genesis	Yes	Yes	Yes	
1994	Crystal's Pony Tale	Action	Altech Studios	Genesis		Yes		
1994	Coca Cola Kid	Action	Aspect	Game Gear		Yes		
1994	College Football's National Championship	Sports	BlueSky Software	Genesis		Yes		
1994	Cosmic Carnage	Fighting	Givro	32X	Yes	Yes	Yes	
1994	Daffy Duck in Hollywood	Action	Psionis Systems	Game Gear			Yes	
1994	Daffy Duck in Hollywood	Action	Psionis Systems	Master System			Yes	
1994	Disney's Aladdin	Action	Sims	Game Gear	Yes	Yes	Yes	
1994	Disney's Aladdin	Action	Sims	Master System			Yes	
1994	Dr. Robotnik's Mean Bean Machine	Puzzle	Compile	Master System			Yes	
1994	Dragon Slayer: Eiyuu Densetsu	RPG	Sega Falcom	Genesis	Yes			
1994	Donald no Magical World	Platform	Sims	Game Gear	Yes			
1994	Dunk Kids	Sports	Sega	Game Gear	Yes			
1994	Doom	FPS	Sega of America, Id Software	32X	Yes	Yes	Yes	
1994	Dynamite Headdy	Action	Treasure	Genesis	Yes	Yes	Yes	
1994	Dynamite Headdy	Action	Minato Giken	Game Gear	Yes	Yes	Yes	
1994	Ecco the Dolphin	Action	Novotrade	Game Gear	Yes	Yes	Yes	
1994	Ecco the Dolphin	Action	Novotrade	Master System			Yes	
1994	Ecco: The Tides of Time	Action	Novotrade	Genesis	Yes	Yes	Yes	
1994	Ecco: The Tides of Time	Action	Novotrade	Game Gear	Yes	Yes	Yes	
1994	Ecco: The Tides of Time	Action	Novotrade	Sega CD		Yes	Yes	
1994	Formula One World Championship: Beyond the Limit	Racing	Sega	Sega CD	Yes	Yes	Yes	
1994	Game no Kanzume Vol.1	Compilation	Sega	Sega CD	Yes			
1994	Game no Kanzume Vol.2	Compilation	Sega	Sega CD	Yes			
1994	GP Rider	Racing	Sega	Game Gear	Yes	Yes	Yes	
1994	Instruments of Chaos Starring Young Indiana Jones	Action	Brian A. Rice	Genesis		Yes		
1994	Ishii Hisaichi no Daisekai	Simulation	G.Sat	Sega CD	Yes			
1994	J.League GG Pro Striker '94	Sports	Sims	Game Gear	Yes			
1994	J.League Pro Striker 2	Sports	Sega	Genesis	Yes			
1994	Jurassic Park: Rampage Edition	Action	BlueSky Software	Genesis		Yes	Yes	
1994	Kenyuu Densetsu Yaiba	Action	Sega	Game Gear	Yes			
1994	Lodoss-tou Senki: Eiyuu Sensou	RPG	Kogado Studio	Sega CD	Yes			
1994	Lord Monarch: Tokoton Sentou Densetsu	RPG	Sega Falcom, Omiyasoft	Genesis	Yes			
1994	Magic Knight Rayearth (Game Gear)	RPG	Sega	Game Gear	Yes			
1994	Magic Knight Rayearth 2: Making of Magic Knight	RPG	Sega	Game Gear	Yes			
1994	The Mansion of Hidden Souls	Adventure	System Sacom	Saturn	Yes	Yes	Yes	
1994	Masters of Combat	Action	Sims	Game Gear	Yes			
1994	Mega Bomberman	Action	Hudson Soft	Genesis		Yes	Yes	
1994	Megami Tensei Gaiden: Last Bible	RPG	Sega, Atlus	Game Gear	Yes			
1994	Midnight Raiders	Action	Stargate Films	Sega CD		Yes	Yes	
1994	Mighty Morphin Power Rangers	Action	Sims	Genesis		Yes	Yes	
1994	Mighty Morphin Power Rangers	Action	Sega	Game Gear		Yes	Yes	
1994	Moldorian: Hikari to Yami no Sister	RPG	Rits	Game Gear	Yes			
1994	Monster World IV	Platform	Westone	Genesis	Yes			
1994	Nazo Puyo Arle no Roux	Puzzle	Compile	Game Gear	Yes			
1994	NBA Action	Sports	Malibu Interactive	Genesis		Yes	Yes	
1994	NBA Action Starring David Robinson	Sports	Sega Interactive	Game Gear		Yes	Yes	
1994	New 3D Golf Simulation: Devil's Course	Sports	T&E Soft	Genesis	Yes			
1994	New 3D Golf Simulation: Waialae no Kiseki	Sports	T&E Soft	Genesis	Yes			
1994	NFL '95	Sports	Double Diamond Sports	Genesis		Yes		
1994	NFL '95	Sports	Double Diamond Sports	Game Gear		Yes		
1994	Prize Fighter	Non-game	Digital Pictures	Sega CD	Yes	Yes	Yes	
1994	Pro Yakyuu GG League '94	Sports	Sega	Game Gear	Yes			
1994	Popful Mail	Action	Sega Falcom	Sega CD	Yes	Yes		
1994	Pulseman	Action	Game Freak	Genesis	Yes			
1994	Puzzle & Action: Tant-R	Puzzle	Sega	Genesis	Yes			
1994	Puzzle & Action: Tant-R	Puzzle	CRI	Game Gear	Yes			
1994	Quest for the Shaven Yak Starring Ren Hoëk & Stimpy	Action	Realtime Associates	Game Gear		Yes	Yes	
1994	Rad Mobile	Racing	Sega	Saturn	Yes			
1994	Shadowrun	RPG	BlueSky Software	Genesis		Yes		
1994	Shining Force CD	Strategy	Sonic Software Planning	Sega CD	Yes	Yes	Yes	
1994	Space Harrier	Shoot em' up	Rutobo Games	32X	Yes	Yes	Yes	
1994	Star Trek: The Next Generation: Echoes from the Past	Adventure	Micropose	Genesis		Yes		
1994	Streets of Rage 2	Action	Ancient	Master System			Yes	
1994	Streets of Rage 3	Action	Sega, Ancient	Genesis	Yes	Yes	Yes	
1994	Sonic & Knuckles	Platform	Sega	Genesis	Yes	Yes	Yes	
1994	Sonic Drift	Racing	Sega	Game Gear	Yes			
1994	Sonic Spinball	Action	Sega Interactive	Game Gear	Yes	Yes		
1994	Sonic Triple Trouble	Platform	Aspect	Game Gear	Yes	Yes	Yes	
1994	Sonic the Hedgehog 3	Platform	Sega	Genesis	Yes	Yes	Yes	
1994	Star Wars Arcade	Shoot em' up	Sega Interactive	32X	Yes	Yes	Yes	
1994	Taz in Escape From Mars	Action	Headgames	Genesis		Yes	Yes	
1994	Taz in Escape From Mars	Action	Headgames	Game Gear		Yes	Yes	
1994	The Berenstain Bears' Camping Adventure	Action	Realtime Associates	Game Gear		Yes		
1994	The Hybrid Front	Strategy	Sega	Genesis	Yes			
1994	The Lion King	Action	Syrox Developments	Master System	Yes	Yes	Yes	
1994	The Lion King	Action	Syrox Developments	Game Gear		Yes	Yes	
1994	The Story of Thor	RPG	Ancient	Genesis	Yes	Yes	Yes	
1994	Tomcat Alley	Shoot em' up	The Code Monkeys	Sega CD	Yes	Yes	Yes	
1994	Torarete Tamaruka!?	Action	Sega	Game Gear	Yes			
1994	OutRunners	Racing	Sega	Genesis	Yes	Yes		
1994	Virtua Fighter	Fighting	Sega (AM2)	Saturn	Yes	Yes	Yes	
1994	Virtua Racing	Racing	Sega	Genesis	Yes	Yes	Yes	
1994	Virtua Racing Deluxe	Racing	Sega	32X	Yes	Yes	Yes	
1994	Wacky Worlds	Educational	Headgames	Genesis		Yes		
1994	WanChai Connection	Adventure	Micronet	Saturn	Yes			
1994	World Championship Soccer II	Sports	Sensible Software	Genesis		Yes	Yes	
1994	World Heroes	Fighting	SNK, Sega Midwest Studio	Genesis		Yes		
1994	World Series Baseball	Sports	BlueSky Software	Genesis		Yes		
1994	World Series Baseball '95'	Sports	BlueSky Software	Game Gear		Yes		
1994	X-Men	Action	Sega of America	Game Gear		Yes	Yes	
1994	X-Men: GamesMaster's Legacy	Action	Sega of America	Game Gear		Yes	Yes	
1994	YuuYuu Hakusho: Horobishi Mono no Gyakushuu	Action	Minato Giken	Game Gear	Yes			
1994	Yuu Yuu Hakusho II: Keikitou! Nanakyou no Tatakai	Action	Minato Giken	Game Gear	Yes			
1994	YuYu Hakusho Gaiden	Adventure	Nextech	Genesis	Yes			
1994	Yuu Yuu Hakusho: Makyou Toitsusen	Action	Treasure	Genesis	Yes			
1995	After Burner	Rail shooter	Rutubo Games	32X	Yes	Yes	Yes	
1995	Alien Soldier	Action	Treasure	Genesis	Yes	Yes	Yes	
1995	Astal	Action	Sega	Saturn	Yes	Yes		
1995	Asterix and the Power of the Gods	Action	Core Design	Genesis			Yes	
1995	Ayrton Senna Personal Talk: Message for the future	Non-game	Sega	Saturn	Yes			
1995	Baku Baku Animal	Puzzle	Sega	Saturn	Yes	Yes	Yes	
1995	Battle Arena Toshinden Remix	Fighting	Nextech, Takara	Saturn	Yes	Yes	Yes	
1995	Black Fire	Shoot em' up	NovaLogic	Saturn	Yes	Yes	Yes	
1995	Blue Seed: Kushinada Hirokuden	RPG	Sega	Saturn	Yes			
1995	Bug!	Platform	Realtime Associates	Saturn	Yes	Yes	Yes	
1995	Cheese Cat-Astrophe Starring Speedy Gonzales	Platform	Cyro Interactive	Genesis			Yes	
1995	Cheese Cat-Astrophe Starring Speedy Gonzales	Platform	Cyro Interactive	Game Gear		Yes	Yes	
1995	Cheese Cat-Astrophe Starring Speedy Gonzales	Platform	Cyro Interactive	Master System			Yes	
1995	Chicago Syndicate	Action	Sega	Game Gear		Yes		
1995	Chōkyūkai Miracle Nine	Sports	Sega	Genesis	Yes			
1995	Clockwork Knight 2	Platform	Sega	Saturn	Yes	Yes	Yes	
1995	College Football's National Championship II	Sports	BlueSky Software	Genesis		Yes		
1995	Comix Zone	Action	Sega Technical Institute	Genesis	Yes	Yes	Yes	
1995	Comix Zone	Action	Sega Technical Institute	Microsoft Windows		Yes	Yes	
1995	Cyber Speedway	Racing	Nextech	Saturn	Yes	Yes	Yes	
1995	Daytona USA	Racing	Sega (AM2)	Saturn	Yes	Yes	Yes	
1995	Desert Demolition Starring Road Runner and Wile E. Coyote	Action	BlueSky Software	Genesis		Yes	Yes	
1995	Dragon Slayer: Eiyuu Densetsu II	RPG	Sega Falcom	Genesis	Yes			
1995	Ecco the Dolphin	Action	Novotrade	Microsoft Windows	Yes	Yes	Yes	
1995	Ecco Jr.	Educational	Appaloosa Interactive	Genesis	Yes	Yes	Yes	
1995	Eternal Champions: Challenge from the Dark Side	Fighting	Sega Interactive	Sega CD		Yes	Yes	
1995	F1 Challenge	Racing	Sega	Saturn	Yes	Yes	Yes	
1995	Fahrenheit	Adventure	Sega of America	Sega CD	Yes	Yes	Yes	
1995	Fahrenheit	Adventure	Sega of America	32X		Yes		
1995	Fred Couples Golf	Sports	Sims	Game Gear	Yes	Yes		
1995	Gakkou no Kaidan	Adventure	JAMP	Saturn	Yes			
1995	Gamble Panic	Gambling	Sega	Game Gear				
1995	Garfield: Caught in the Act	Action	Sega Interactive	Genesis		Yes	Yes	
1995	Garfield: Caught in the Act	Action	Novotrade International	Game Gear		Yes	Yes	
1995	Garfield: Caught in the Act	Action	Sega Interactive	Microsoft Windows		Yes		
1995	Ghen War	Action	Jumpin' Jack Software	Saturn	Yes	Yes	Yes	
1995	Greatest Nine	Sports	Sega	Saturn	Yes			
1995	Godzilla Kaijuu no Daishingeki	Simulation	Sega	Game Gear	Yes			
1995	Godzilla Rettoushinkan	Strategy	Scarab	Saturn	Yes			
1995	Golden Axe: The Duel	Fighting	Sega	Saturn	Yes	Yes	Yes	
1995	Golf Magazine: 36 Great Holes Starring Fred Couples	Sports	Flashpoint Productions	32X	Yes	Yes	Yes	
1995	Gotha: Ismailia Seneki	Strategy	Micronet	Saturn	Yes			
1995	Gunstar Heroes	Action	M2	Game Gear	Yes			
1995	Hang-On GP	Driving	Genki	Saturn	Yes	Yes	Yes	
1995	Iron Storm	Strategy	Systemsoft	Saturn	Yes	Yes		
1995	J.League Soccer Dream Eleven	Sports	Sims	Game Gear	Yes			
1995	Kishin Douji Zenki	Action	Sega	Game Gear	Yes			
1995	Knuckles' Chaotix	Platform	Sega	32X	Yes	Yes	Yes	
1995	Legend of Illusion starring Mickey Mouse	Platform	Aspect	Game Gear	Yes	Yes	Yes	
1995	Light Crusader	RPG	Treasure	Genesis	Yes	Yes	Yes	
1995	Magic Knight Rayearth	RPG	Sega	Saturn	Yes	Yes		
1995	Marsupilami	Action	Apache Software	Genesis		Yes	Yes	
1995	Metal Head	Action	Sega	32X	Yes	Yes	Yes	
1995	Mighty Morphin Power Rangers	Action	Orion Technologies	Sega CD		Yes	Yes	
1995	Mighty Morphin Power Rangers: The Movie	Action	Sims	Genesis		Yes	Yes	
1995	Mighty Morphin Power Rangers: The Movie	Action	Sims	Game Gear		Yes	Yes	
1995	Motocross Championship	Racing	Artech Studios	32X		Yes	Yes	
1995	Mystaria: The Realms of Lore	RPG	Micro Cabin	Saturn	Yes			
1995	NBA Action '95 Starring David Robinson	Sports	Double Diamond Sports	Genesis		Yes	Yes	
1995	NHL All-Star Hockey '95	Sports	Sega Midwest Studio	Genesis		Yes		
1995	NHL All-Star Hockey	Sports	Gray Matter	Saturn		Yes	Yes	
1995	NHL All-Star Hockey	Sports	Gray Matter	Game Gear		Yes		
1995	Ninku	RPG	Sega	Game Gear	Yes			
1995	Ninku 2: Tenkuryu-e no Michi	Action	Sega	Game Gear	Yes			
1995	Ninku Gaiden: Hiroyuki Daikatsugeki	Action	Sega	Game Gear	Yes			
1995	Panzer Dragoon	Rail shooter	Sega (Team Andromeda)	Saturn	Yes	Yes	Yes	
1995	Pebble Beach Golf Links	Sports	T&E Soft	Saturn	Yes	Yes	Yes	
1995	Pepenga Pengo	Action	Sega	Genesis	Yes			
1995	Photo CD Operating System	Non-game	Sega	Saturn	Yes			
1995	Premier Manager	Sports, Simulation	Gremlin Interactive	Genesis	Yes			
1995	Prime Time NFL Football Starring Deion Sanders	Sports	Spectucalur Games	Genesis	Yes			
1995	Pro Striker Final Stage	Sports	Sega	Genesis	Yes			
1995	Puzzle & Action: Ichidant-R	Puzzle	Sega	Genesis	Yes			
1995	Rampo	Adventure	System Sacom	Saturn	Yes			
1995	Ristar	Platform	Sega	Genesis	Yes	Yes	Yes	
1995	Ristar	Platform	Minato Giken	Game Gear	Yes	Yes	Yes	
1995	Royal Stone	RPG	Sega	Game Gear	Yes			
1995	Scholastic's The Magic School Bus: Space Exploration Game	Educational	Novotrade Interactive	Genesis		Yes		
1995	Shadow Squadron	Action	Sega	32X	Yes	Yes	Yes	
1995	Sega International Victory Goal	Sports	Sega	Saturn	Yes	Yes	Yes	
1995	Sega Rally Championship	Racing	Sega	Saturn	Yes	Yes	Yes	
1995	Shining Force Gaiden: Final Conflict	Strategy	Sonic Software Planning	Game Gear	Yes			
1995	Shining Wisdom	Action RPG	Sonic Software Planning	Saturn	Yes	Yes	Yes	
1995	Shinobi Legions	Action	Sega	Saturn	Yes	Yes	Yes	
1995	Sports Talk Baseball	Sports	Sega	Genesis		Yes		
1995	Sports Trivia: Championship Edition	Puzzle	Adrenaline Entertainment	Game Gear		Yes		
1995	Striker	Sports	Rage Software	Genesis			Yes	
1995	Striker	Sports	Rage Software	Game Gear			Yes	
1995	Sonic Drift 2	Racing	Sega, Arc System Works	Game Gear	Yes	Yes	Yes	
1995	Sonic Labyrinth	Platform	Minato Giken	Game Gear	Yes	Yes	Yes	
1995	Sonic Spinball	Action	Sega Interactive	Game Gear		Yes	Yes	
1995	Super Columns	Puzzle	Sega	Game Gear	Yes	Yes	Yes	
1995	Surging Aura	RPG	JAMP	Genesis	Yes			
1995	Surgical Strike	Rail shooter	The Code Monkeys	Sega CD	Yes			
1995	Surgical Strike	Rail shooter	The Code Monkeys	32X	Yes	Yes	Yes	
1995	Sylvan Tale	RPG	Sega	Game Gear	Yes			
1995	Tails Adventure	Platform	Aspect	Game Gear	Yes	Yes	Yes	
1995	Tails' Skypatrol	Action	Sims	Game Gear	Yes			
1995	Tama & Friends: 3 Choume Kouen Tamalympic	Action	Aspect	Game Gear	Yes			
1995	Tempo	Platform	Red Entertainment	32X	Yes	Yes		
1995	Tempo Jr.	Platform	Sims	Game Gear	Yes	Yes	Yes	
1995	Tomcat Alley	Non-game	Novotrade	Microsoft Windows		Yes	Yes	
1995	Tatakae! Pro Yakyuu Twin League	Sports	Sega	Game Gear	Yes			
1995	The Adventures of Batman & Robin	Action	Clockwork Toise	Genesis		Yes	Yes	
1995	The Adventures of Batman & Robin	Action	Novotrade	Game Gear		Yes	Yes	
1995	The Adventures of Batman & Robin	Action	Clockwork Toise	Sega CD		Yes	Yes	
1995	The Quiz Gear Fight!!	Puzzle	Sega	Game Gear	Yes			
1995	The Ooze	Action	Sega Technical Institute	Genesis		Yes	Yes	
1995	Vectorman	Action	BlueSky Software	Genesis		Yes	Yes	
1995	Virtua Cop	Light gun shooter	Sega (AM2)	Saturn	Yes	Yes	Yes	
1995	Virtua Fighter	Fighting	Sega	32X	Yes	Yes	Yes	
1995	Virtua Fighter 2	Fighting	Sega (AM2)	Saturn	Yes	Yes	Yes	
1995	Virtua Fighter CG Portrait Series Vol. 1 Sarah Bryant	Non-game	Sega (AM2)	Saturn	Yes			
1995	Virtua Fighter CG Portrait Series Vol. 2 Jacky Bryant	Non-game	Sega (AM2)	Saturn	Yes			
1995	Virtua Fighter CG Portrait Series Vol. 3 Akira Yuki	Non-game	Sega (AM2)	Saturn	Yes			
1995	Virtua Fighter CG Portrait Series Vol. 4 Pai Chan	Non-game	Sega (AM2)	Saturn	Yes			
1995	Virtua Fighter CG Portrait Series Vol. 5 Wolf Hawkfield	Non-game	Sega (AM2)	Saturn	Yes			
1995	Virtua Fighter CG Portrait Series Vol. 6 Lau Chan	Non-game	Sega (AM2)	Saturn	Yes			
1995	Virtua Fighter Remix	Fighting	Sega	Saturn	Yes			
1995	Virtual Hydlide	Action RPG	T&E Soft	Saturn	Yes			
1995	VR Troopers	Fighting	Syrox Developments	Genesis		Yes	Yes	
1995	VR Troopers	Fighting	Syrox Developments	Game Gear		Yes	Yes	
1995	Wild Woody	Platform	Sega Multimedia Studio	Sega CD		Yes		
1995	Wing Arms	Simulation	Bell Corporation	Saturn	Yes	Yes	Yes	
1995	Wirehead	Adventure	The Code Monkeys	Sega CD		Yes		
1995	World Series Baseball	Sports	Sega	Saturn	Yes	Yes	Yes	
1995	World Series Baseball '95'	Sports	BlueSky Software	Genesis		Yes		
1995	World Series Baseball Starring Deion Sanders	Sports	BlueSky Software	32X		Yes		
1995	X Japan Virtual Shock 001	Non-game	I2Project	Saturn	Yes			
1995	X-Men 2: Clone Wars	Platform	Headgames	Genesis		Yes	Yes	
1995	Zaxxon's Motherbase 2000	Shoot em' up	CRI	32X	Yes	Yes	Yes	
1996	Arena: Maze of Death	Action	Eden Entertainment Software	Game Gear		Yes	Yes	
1996	Baku Baku Animal	Puzzle	Sega	Microsoft Windows	Yes	Yes	Yes	
1996	Baku Baku Animal	Puzzle	Minato Giken	Game Gear	Yes	Yes	Yes	
1996	Bugs Bunny in Double Trouble	Action	Probe Software	Genesis		Yes	Yes	
1996	Bugs Bunny in Double Trouble	Action	Probe Software	Game Gear		Yes	Yes	
1996	Bug Too!	Platform	RealTime Associates	Saturn	Yes	Yes	Yes	
1996	Christmas NiGHTS into Dreams	Action	Sega (Sonic Team)	Saturn	Yes	Yes	Yes	
1996	Congo the Movie: The Lost City of Zinj	FPS	Jampin' Jack	Saturn		Yes		
1996	Cyber Troopers Virtual-On: Operation Moongate	Action, Fighting	CRI	Saturn	Yes	Yes	Yes	
1996	Dark Saviour	Action RPG	Climax	Saturn	Yes	Yes	Yes	
1996	Daytona USA	Racing	Sega	Microsoft Windows	Yes	Yes	Yes	
1996	Daytona USA: Championship Circuit Edition	Racing	Sega	Saturn	Yes	Yes	Yes	
1996	Decathlete	Sports	Data East, Sega	Saturn	Yes	Yes	Yes	
1996	Die Hard Arcade	Action	Sega, Sega Technical Institute	Saturn	Yes	Yes	Yes	
1996	Dragon Force	Strategy	Sega, J-Force	Saturn	Yes	Yes	Yes	
1996	Doraemon: Wakuwaku Pocket Paradise	Action	Sega	Game Gear	Yes			
1996	Fighters Megamix	Fighting	Sega (AM2)	Saturn	Yes	Yes	Yes	
1996	Fighting Vipers	Fighting	Sega (AM2)	Saturn	Yes	Yes	Yes	
1996	Game no Kanzume Otokuyou	Compilation	Sega	Genesis	Yes			
1996	GG Portrait: Pai Chan	Non-game	Sega	Game Gear	Yes			
1996	GG Portrait: Yuuki Akira	Non-game	Sega	Game Gear	Yes			
1996	Gungriffon	Action	Game Arts	Saturn	Yes	Yes	Yes	
1996	Greatest Nine 96	Sports	Sega	Saturn	Yes			
1996	Guardian Heroes	Action	Treasure	Saturn	Yes	Yes	Yes	
1996	J.League Pro Soccer Club o Tsukurou!	Sports	Sega	Saturn	Yes			
1996	Jinzou Ningen Hakaider: Last Judgement	Rail shooter	JAMP	Saturn	Yes			
1996	Kaitou Saint Tail	Action	Minato Giken	Game Gear	Yes			
1996	Linkle Liver Story	Action RPG	Nextech	Saturn	Yes			
1996	Lulu: Un Conte Interactif de Romain Victor-Pujebet	Non-game	System Sacom	Saturn	Yes			
1996	Magical Drop 2	Puzzle	Data East	Saturn	Yes			
1996	Mr. Bones	Action	Zono	Saturn	Yes	Yes	Yes	
1996	NBA Action	Sports	Gray Matter	Saturn		Yes	Yes	
1996	Neon Genesis Evangelion: 1st Impression	Adventure	Sega	Saturn	Yes			
1996	NFL '97	Sports	GameTek	Saturn		Yes		
1996	Nights into Dreams...	Action	Sega (Sonic Team)	Saturn	Yes	Yes	Yes	
1996	Ninku: Tsuyokina Yatsura no Daigekitotsu!	Fighting	Sims	Saturn	Yes			
1996	Panzer Dragoon	Rail shooter	Sega	Microsoft Windows	Yes	Yes	Yes	
1996	Panzer Dragoon Mini	Rail shooter	Sega	Game Gear	Yes			
1996	Panzer Dragoon Zwei	Rail shooter	Sega (Team Andromeda)	Saturn	Yes	Yes	Yes	
1996	Pet Club: Inu Daisuki!	Simulation	Sega	Game Gear	Yes			
1996	Pet Club: Neko Daisuki!	Simulation	Sega	Game Gear	Yes			
1996	Premier Manager 97	Sports, Simulation	Gremlin Interactive	Genesis			Yes	
1996	Pro Yakyuu Team no Tsukurou!	Sports, Simulation	Sega	Saturn	Yes			
1996	Riglordsaga 2	Tactial RPG	Micro Cabin	Saturn	Yes	Yes	Yes	
1996	Rocket Jockey	Action	Rocket Science Games	Microsoft Windows		Yes		
1996	Sakura Taisen	Adventure, Strategy	Sega, Red Entertainment	Saturn	Yes			
1996	Sega Ages Vol.1 Syukudai ga Tant-R	Puzzle	Kuusoukagaku	Saturn	Yes			
1996	Sega Ages Vol.2 Space Harrier	Rail shooter	Rutubo Games	Saturn	Yes			
1996	Sega Ages Vol.3 OutRun	Driving	Rutubo Games	Saturn	Yes			
1996	Sega Ages Vol.4 After Burner II	Rail shooter	Rutubo Games	Saturn	Yes			
1996	Sega Ages Vol. 5 Rouka ni Ichidant-R	Puzzle	Kuusoukagaku	Saturn	Yes			
1996	Sega Rally Championship Plus	Racing	Sega	Saturn	Yes			
1996	Shining the Holy Ark	RPG	Camelot	Saturn	Yes	Yes	Yes	
1996	Spider-Man: Web of Fire	Action	BlueSky Software	32X		Yes		
1996	Sonic 3D: Flickies' Island	Platform	Travellers Tales	Genesis		Yes	Yes	
1996	Sonic 3D: Flickies' Island	Platform	Travellers Tales	Saturn	Yes	Yes	Yes	
1996	Sonic Blast	Platform	Aspect	Game Gear	Yes	Yes	Yes	
1996	Sonic Schoolhouse	Educational	Orion Interactive	Microsoft Windows		Yes		
1996	Sonic the Hedgehog CD	Platform	Sega	Microsoft Windows	Yes	Yes	Yes	
1996	Terra Phantastica	RPG	Chime	Saturn	Yes			
1996	The Story of Thor 2	Action RPG	Ancient	Saturn	Yes	Yes	Yes	
1996	Three Dirty Dwarves	Action	Appaloosa Interactive	Saturn	Yes	Yes	Yes	
1996	Three Dirty Dwarves	Action	Appaloosa Interactive	Microsoft Windows		Yes		
1996	Torico	Adventure	System Sacom	Saturn	Yes	Yes	Yes	
1996	Obsidian	Adventure	Rocket Science Games	Microsoft Windows		Yes		
1996	Omakase! Taimawaza	Adventure	JAMP	Saturn	Yes			
1996	UEFA Euro 96 England	Sports	Gremlin Interactive	Saturn		Yes	Yes	
1996	Vectorman 2	Action	BlueSky Software	Genesis		Yes		
1996	Virtua Cop	Rail shooter	Sega	Microsoft Windows	Yes	Yes	Yes	
1996	Virtua Cop 2	Rail shooter	Sega (AM2)	Saturn	Yes	Yes	Yes	
1996	Virtua Fighter 2	Fighting	Success	Genesis		Yes	Yes	
1996	Virtua Fighter Animation	Fighting	Aspect	Game Gear	Yes			
1996	Virtua Fighter CG Portrait Series Vol. 7 Shun Di	Non-game	Sega (AM2)	Saturn	Yes			
1996	Virtua Fighter CG Portrait Series Vol. 8 Lion Rafale	Non-game	Sega (AM2)	Saturn	Yes			
1996	Virtua Fighter CG Portrait Series Vol. 9 Kage Maru	Non-game	Sega (AM2)	Saturn	Yes			
1996	Virtua Fighter CG Portrait Series Vol. 10 Jeffry McWild	Non-game	Sega (AM2)	Saturn	Yes			
1996	Virtua Fighter CG Portrait Series The Final Dural	Non-game	Sega (AM2)	Saturn	Yes			
1996	Virtua Fighter Kids	Fighting	Sega (AM2)	Saturn	Yes			
1996	Virtua Fighter Remix	Fighting	Sega	Microsoft Windows	Yes			
1996	Victory Goal '96	Sports	Sega	Saturn	Yes			
1996	World Advanced Daisenryaku: Sakusen File	Strategy	Systemsoft	Saturn	Yes			
1996	World Series Baseball '96	Sports	BlueSky Software	Genesis		Yes		
1996	World Series Baseball '96	Sports	Sega	Microsoft Windows	Yes			
1996	World Series Baseball II	Sports	Sega	Saturn	Yes	Yes	Yes	
1996	World Series Baseball Starring Deion Sanders	Sports	BlueSky Software	32X		Yes		
1996	X-Men: Mojo World	Action	Sega of America	Game Gear		Yes		
1996	X-Perts	Action	Abalone Software	Genesis		Yes		
1997	Advanced World War: Sennen Teikoku no Koubou	Strategy	Nextech	Saturn	Yes			
1997	Daytona USA Evolution	Racing	Sega	Microsoft Windows	Yes	Yes	Yes	
1997	Digital Dance Mix Vol. 1 Namie Amuro	Rhythm	Sega (AM2)	Saturn	Yes			
1997	Duke Nukem 3D	FPS	Lobotomy Software	Saturn	Yes	Yes	Yes	
1997	Emperor of Fading Suns	Simulation	Holistic Design	Microsoft Windows		Yes		
1997	Enemy Zero	Adventure	WARP	Saturn	Yes	Yes	Yes	
1997	Fighter's History Dynamite	Fighting	Rutobo Games, Data East	Saturn	Yes			
1997	Greatest Nine 97	Sports	Sega	Saturn	Yes			
1997	Grossology	Educational	Appaloosa Interactive	Microsoft Windows		Yes		
1997	Hanagumi Taisen Columns	Puzzle	Sega, Red Entertainment	Saturn	Yes			
1997	J.League Pro Soccer Club o Tsukurou! 2	Sports, Simulation	Sega	Saturn	Yes			
1997	Kidou Senkan Nadesico: Yappari Saigo ha 'Ai ga Katsu'?	Adventure	Nexus Interact	Saturn	Yes			
1997	Last Bronx	Fighting	Sega	Saturn	Yes	Yes	Yes	
1997	Lose Your Marbles	Puzzle	SegaSoft	Microsoft Windows		Yes		
1997	Manx TT SuperBike	Racing	Tantalus Interactive, Sega	Saturn	Yes	Yes	Yes	
1997	Neon Genesis Evangelion: 2nd Impression	Adventure	Sega	Saturn	Yes			
1997	Neon Genesis Evangelion: Digital Card Library	Tabletop	Sega	Saturn	Yes			
1997	NBA Action 98	Sports	Visual Concepts	Saturn	Yes	Yes		
1997	NBA Action 98	Sports	Visual Concepts	Microsoft Windows	Yes	Yes	Yes	
1997	NFL 98	Sports	Spectacular Games	Genesis		Yes		
1997	NHL All-Star Hockey 98	Sports	Radical Entertainment	Saturn		Yes	Yes	
1997	Platoon Leader	Strategy	Chicken Head Software	Microsoft Windows	Yes			
1997	Pro Yakyuu Greatest Nine 97 Make Miracle	Sports	Sega	Saturn	Yes			
1997	Quake	FPS	Lobotomy Software, id Software	Saturn	Yes	Yes		
1997	Sakura Taisen Hanagumi Tsuushin	Non-game	Sega, Red Entertainment	Saturn	Yes			
1997	Sakura Taisen Jouki Radio Show	Non-game	Sega, Red Entertainment	Saturn	Yes			
1997	Saturn Bomberman	Action	Hudson Soft	Saturn	Yes	Yes	Yes	
1997	Scud: Industrial Evolution	Action	Cinergi	Microsoft Windows		Yes		
1997	Scud: The Disposable Assassin	Rail shooter	Syrox Developments	Saturn		Yes		
1997	Sega Ages Vol.1	Compilation	Rutubo Games	Saturn		Yes	Yes	
1997	Sega Ages Vol. 6 Fantasy Zone	Shoot em' up	Rutubo Games	Saturn	Yes			
1997	Sega Ages Vol. 7 Memorial Selection Vol. 1	Compilation	Rutubo Games	Saturn	Yes			
1997	Sega Ages Vol. 8 Columns Arcade Collection	Puzzle	Rutubo Games	Saturn	Yes			
1997	Sega AgesVol. 9 Memorial Selection Vol. 2	Compilation	Rutubo Games	Saturn	Yes			
1997	Sega Ages Vol. 10 Power Drift	Racing	Rutubo Games	Saturn	Yes			
1997	Sega Ages Vol. 11 Phantasy Star Collection	Compilation	Rutubo Games	Saturn	Yes			
1997	Sega Ages Vol. 12 Galaxy Force II	Shoot em' up	Rutubo Games	Saturn	Yes			
1997	Sega Ages Vol. 13 I Love Mickey Mouse: Fushigi no Oshiro Daibouken/I Love Donald Duck: Guruzia Ou no Hihou	Compilation	Rutubo Games	Saturn	Yes			
1997	Sega Rally Championship	Racing	Sega	Microsoft Windows	Yes	Yes	Yes	
1997	Sega Touring Car Championship	Racing	Sega	Saturn	Yes	Yes	Yes	
1997	Sega Worldwide Soccer	Sports	Sega	Microsoft Windows	Yes	Yes	Yes	
1997	Sega Worldwide Soccer 97	Sports	Sega	Saturn	Yes	Yes	Yes	
1997	Sega Worldwide Soccer 97	Sports	Sega	Microsoft Windows	Yes	Yes	Yes	
1997	Shining Force III Scenario I	Tactical RPG	Camelot	Saturn	Yes	Yes	Yes	
1997	Sky Target	Shoot em' up	Tantalus Interactive	Saturn	Yes	Yes	Yes	
1997	Sky Target	Shoot em' up	Tantalus Interactive	Microsoft Windows	Yes			
1997	Söldnerschild	Strategy	Sega, Koei	Saturn	Yes			
1997	Sonic 3D: Flickies' Island	Platform	Travellers Tales	Microsoft Windows		Yes	Yes	
1997	Sonic & Knuckles Collection	Platform	Sega	Microsoft Windows	Yes	Yes	Yes	
1997	Sonic Jam	Compilation	Sega (Sonic Team)	Saturn	Yes	Yes	Yes	
1997	Sonic R	Racing	Travellers Tales	Saturn	Yes	Yes	Yes	
1997	The Lost World: Jurassic Park	Action	BlueSky Software	Genesis		Yes		
1997	The Lost World: Jurassic Park	Action	Sega	Game Gear		Yes		
1997	The Lost World: Jurassic Park	Action	Appaloosa Interactive	Saturn	Yes	Yes	Yes	
1997	The Space Bar	Adventure	Rocket Science Games	Microsoft Windows		Yes		
1997	Virtua Cop 2	Rail shooter	Sega	Microsoft Windows	Yes	Yes	Yes	
1997	Virtua Fighter 2	Fighting	Sega	Microsoft Windows	Yes	Yes	Yes	
1997	Virtua Fighter PC	Fighting	Sega	Microsoft Windows	Yes	Yes	Yes	
1997	World Series Baseball '98	Sports	BlueSky Software	Genesis		Yes		
1997	World Series Baseball '98	Sports	Sega	Saturn		Yes		
1997	Zen Nihon Pro Wres Featuring Virtua	Fighting	Scarab	Saturn	Yes			
1998	Advanced Daisenryaku 98	Strategy	Sega, Systemsoft	Microsoft Windows	Yes			
1998	Burning Rangers	Action	Sega (Sonic Team)	Saturn	Yes			
1998	Deep Fear	Horror	System Sacom	Saturn	Yes			
1998	Dragon Force II	Tactical RPG	Sega	Saturn	Yes			
1998	Fatal Abyss	Action	The Human Software	Microsoft Windows		Yes		
1998	Flesh Feast	Action	Ingames Interactive	Microsoft Windows		Yes		
1998	Enemy Zero	Horror	WARP	Microsoft Windows	Yes	Yes	Yes	
1998	Greatest Nine 98	Sports	Sega	Saturn	Yes			
1998	Godzilla Generations	Action	General Entertainment	Dreamcast	Yes			
1998	Panzer Dragoon Saga	RPG	Sega (Team Andromeda)	Saturn	Yes	Yes	Yes	
1998	Paso Pico Doraemon: Nobita no Machinaka Doki Doki Tanken!	Educational	Sega Toys	Microsoft Windows	Yes			
1998	Paso Pico Sanrio Puroland Asobinagara Oboeyou! Hiragana Katakana	Educational	Sega Toys	Microsoft Windows	Yes			
1998	Pro Yakyuu Greatest Nine 98 Summer Action	Sports, Simulation	Sega	Saturn	Yes			
1998	Pro Yakyuu Team o Tsukurou!	Sports, Simulation	Sega	Saturn	Yes			
1998	Kidou Senkan Nadesico: The Blank of 3 Years	Adventure	Scarab	Saturn	Yes			
1998	Last Bronx	Fighting	Sega	Microsoft Windows	Yes	Yes	Yes	
1998	Net Fighter	Fighting	Syrox Developments	Microsoft Windows		Yes		
1998	Nippon Daihyou Team no Kantoku ni Narou! Sekaihatsu, Soccer RPG	RPG	Sega, Enix	Saturn	Yes			
1998	Paso Pico Doraemon: Nobita no Machinaka Doki Doki Tanken!	Educational	Sega Toys	Microsoft Windows	Yes			
1998	Paso Pico Sanrio Puroland Asobinagara Oboeyou! Hiragana Katakana	Educational	Sega Toys	Microsoft Windows	Yes			
1998	Plane Crazy	Action	Inner Workings	Microsoft Windows	Yes			
1998	Sega Memorial Selection	Compilation	Sega	Microsoft Windows	Yes			
1998	Sakura Taisen 2	Adventure, Tactical RPG	Red Entertainment, Sega	Saturn	Yes			
1998	Sakura Taisen Teigeki Graph	Non-game	Red Entertainment, Sega	Saturn	Yes			
1998	Segata Sanshirou Shinken Yuugi	Mini games	Ecole Software	Saturn	Yes			
1998	Sega Touring Car Championship	Racing	Sega	Microsoft Windows	Yes	Yes	Yes	
1998	Sega Worldwide Soccer 98	Sports	Sega	Saturn	Yes	Yes	Yes	
1998	Shining Force III Scenario II	Tactical RPG	Camelot	Saturn	Yes			
1998	Shining Force III Scenario III	Tactical RPG	Camelot	Saturn	Yes			
1998	Shoujo Kakumei Utena: Itsuka Kakumei Sareru Monogatari	Adventure	Sega	Saturn	Yes			
1998	Sonic Adventure	Platform	Sega (Sonic Team)	Dreamcast	Yes	Yes	Yes	
1998	Sonic R	Racing	Travellers Tales	Microsoft Windows	Yes	Yes	Yes	
1998	The House of the Dead	Rail shooter	Tantalus Interactive, Sega (AM1)	Saturn	Yes	Yes	Yes	
1998	The House of the Dead	Rail shooter	Tantalus Interactive, Sega (AM1)	Microsoft Windows	Yes	Yes	Yes	
1998	Virtua Fighter 3tb	Fighting	Genki, Sega (AM2)	Dreamcast	Yes	Yes	Yes	
1998	Wachenröder	Tactial RPG	TNS Co., Ltd.	Saturn	Yes			
1998	World Cup '98 France: Road to Win	Sports	Sega	Saturn	Yes			
1998	World League Soccer '98	Sports	Silicon Dreams	Saturn	Yes			
1998	Vigilance	Action	Postlinear Entertainment	Microsoft Windows	Yes			
1998	Winter Heat	Sports	Data East, Sega (AM3)	Saturn	Yes	Yes	Yes	
1998	Yoot Tower	Simulation	OPeNBooK9003	Microsoft Windows		Yes		
1999	Advanced Daisenryaku 98 Zwei	Strategy	Chicken Head, Systemsoft	Microsoft Windows	Yes			
1999	Atsumare! Guru Guru Onsen	Tabletop	Sega	Dreamcast	Yes			
1999	Akihabara Dennou-gumi Pata Pies!	Simulation	Westone	Dreamcast	Yes			
1999	Chou-Hatsumei Boy Kanipan: Bousou Robot no Nazo!?	RPG	Quintet	Dreamcast	Yes			
1999	Chu Chu Rocket	Puzzle	Sega (Sonic Team)	Dreamcast	Yes	Yes	Yes	
1999	Cyber Troopers Virtual-On: Oratorio Tangram	Action, Fighting	CRI, Sega	Dreamcast	Yes	Yes		
1999	Flag to Flag	Racing	ZOOM Inc.	Dreamcast	Yes	Yes		
1999	Gakkyuu Ou Yamazaki: Yamazaki Oukoku Daifunsou!	Table	Sega	Dreamcast	Yes			
1999	Giant Gram 2: All Japan Pro Wrestling In Nippon Budokan	Fighting	Scarab	Dreamcast	Yes			
1999	Kiteretsu Shounen's Gangagan	Action	Sega	Yes				
1999	Miffy The First Time To Meet Pasokonsofuto (1) Life	Educational	Sega	Microsoft Windows	Yes			
1999	NBA 2K	Sports	Visual Concepts	Dreamcast	Yes	Yes	Yes	
1999	NFL 2K	Sports	Visual Concepts	Dreamcast	Yes	Yes		
1999	Paso Pico Gojira Doki Doki Kaijuu-tou!!	Educational	Sega Toys	Microsoft Windows	Yes			
1999	Puyo Puyo~n	Puzzle	Compile	Dreamcast	Yes			
1999	Puyo Puyo Tsuu	Puzzle	Bandai	NeoGeo Pocket Color	Yes			
1999	Puyo Puyo Tsuu	Puzzle	Bandai	WonderSwan Color	Yes			
1999	Sakura Taisen	Adventure, Tactical RPG	Sega, Red Entertainment	Microsoft Windows	Yes			
1999	Seaman	Simulation	Vivarium	Dreamcast	Yes			
1999	Sega Bass Fishing	Simulation	Sega	Dreamcast	Yes			
1999	Sega Rally 2	Racing	Sega	Dreamcast	Yes	Yes	Yes	
1999	Sega Rally 2	Racing	Sega	Microsoft Windows	Yes	Yes	Yes	
1999	Sega Smash Pack	Compilation	Sega of America	Microsoft Windows		Yes		
1999	Shenmue	Action adventure	Sega (AM2)	Dreamcast	Yes	Yes	Yes	
1999	Space Channel 5	Rhythm	Sega	Dreamcast	Yes	Yes	Yes	
1999	Sonic the Hedgehog Pocket Adventure	Platform	Sega (Sonic Team), SNK	Neo Geo Pocket Color	Yes	Yes	Yes	
1999	Sonic Shuffle	Mini games	Hudson	Dreamcast	Yes	Yes	Yes	
1999	The House of the Dead 2	Rail shooter	Sega	Dreamcast	Yes	Yes	Yes	
1999	Time Stalkers	RPG	Climax	Dreamcast	Yes	Yes	Yes	
1999	Toy Commander	Action	No Cliché	Dreamcast	Yes	Yes	Yes	
2000	18 Wheeler: American Pro Trucker	Driving	Sega (AM2)	Dreamcast	Yes	Yes	Yes	
2000	Bikkuriman 2000 Viva! Festival!	Minigames	Sega Toys	Dreamcast	Yes			
2000	Bikkuriman 2000 Viva! Pocket Festival!	Minigames	Sega Toys	NeoGeo Pocket Color	Yes			
2000	Cardcaptor Sakura: Tomoyo no Video Daisakusen	Action	Sega (Sega Rosso)	Dreamcast	Yes			
2000	Crazy Taxi	Driving	Sega (Hitmaker)	Dreamcast	Yes	Yes	Yes	
2000	Daytona USA 2001	Racing	Sega (Amusement Vision), Genki	Dreamcast	Yes	Yes	Yes	
2000	Derby Tsuku: Derby Uma o Tsukurou!	Sports, Simulation	Sega (Smilebit)	Dreamcast	Yes			
2000	Dreamstudio	Game creation	Nextech	Dreamcast	Yes			
2000	Ferrari F355 Challenge	Racing	Sega (AM2)	Dreamcast	Yes	Yes	Yes	
2000	Giant Gram 2000: All Japan Pro Wrestling 3	Fighting	Sega (WOW Entertainment)	Dreamcast	Yes			
2000	Jet Set Radio	Platform, Action	Sega (Smilebit)	Dreamcast	Yes	Yes	Yes	
2000	Love Hina: Totsuzen no Engeji	Adventure	Fortyfive	Dreamcast	Yes			
2000	Metropolis Street Racer	Racing	Bizarre Creations	Dreamcast	Yes			
2000	Motto Pro Yakyuu Team o Tsukurou!	Sports, Simulation	Sega (Smilebit)	Dreamcast	Yes			
2000	NappleTale: Arsia in Daydream	Action RPG	Chime	Dreamcast	Yes			
2000	NBA 2K1	Sports	Visual Concepts	Dreamcast	Yes	Yes		
2000	NFL 2K1	Sports	Visual Concepts	Dreamcast	Yes	Yes		
2000	Phantasy Star Online	Action RPG	Sega (Sonic Team)	Dreamcast	Yes	Yes	Yes	
2000	Pro Yakyuu Team de Asobou Net!	Sports, Simulation	Sega (Smilebit)	Dreamcast	Yes			
2000	Quiz Aa! Megami-sama: Tatakau Tsubasa to Tomon	Adventure	Sega (WOW Entertainment)	Dreamcast	Yes			
2000	Rent A Hero No.1	Action adventure	Sega, Aspect	Dreamcast	Yes			
2000	Roommania #203	Simulation	Sega (Wave Master)	Dreamcast	Yes			
2000	Sakura Taisen	Adventure, Tactical RPG	M2	Dreamcast	Yes			
2000	Samba de Amigo	Rhythm	Sega (Sonic Team)	Dreamcast	Yes	Yes	Yes	
2000	Sega GT	Racing	Sega (WOW Entertainment)	Dreamcast	Yes	Yes	Yes	
2000	Sega Marine Fishing	Simulation	Sega (WOW Entertainment)	Dreamcast	Yes	Yes		
2000	Sega Swirl	Puzzle	Tremor Entertainment	Dreamcast		Yes	Yes	
2000	Sega Swirl	Puzzle	Tremor Entertainment	Microsoft Windows		Yes		
2000	Sega Tetris	Puzzle	Sega (WOW Entertainment)	Dreamcast	Yes			
2000	Skies of Arcadia		Sega (Overworks)	Dreamcast	Yes	Yes	Yes	
2000	Soccer Tsuku Tokudaigou: J.League Pro Soccer Club o Tsukurou!	Sports, Simulation	Sega (Smilebit)	Dreamcast	Yes			
2000	The Typing of the Dead	Educational	Sega (Smilebit)	Dreamcast	Yes	Yes		
2000	The Typing of the Dead	Educational	Sega (Smilebit)	Microsoft Windows	Yes	Yes	Yes	
2000	Toy Racer	Racing	No Cliche	Dreamcast			Yes	
2000	Virtua Athlete 2K	Sports	Sega (Hitmaker)	Dreamcast	Yes	Yes	Yes	
2000	Virtua Tennis	Sports	Sega (Hitmaker)	Dreamcast		Yes	Yes	
2001	90 Minutes: Sega Championship Football	Sports	Sega (Smilebit)	Dreamcast	Yes		Yes	
2001	Advanced Daisenryaku 2001	Strategy	Chicken Head, Systemsoft	Dreamcast	Yes			
2001	Alien Front Online	Action	Sega (WOW Entertainment)	Dreamcast			Yes	
2001	Boku Doraemon	Adventure	Sega Toys	Dreamcast	Yes			
2001	Bomberman Online	Action	Hudson Soft	Dreamcast		Yes		
2001	Candy Stripe	Adventure	Sega (WOW Entertainment)	Dreamcast	Yes			
2001	ChuChu Rocket!	Puzzle	Sega (Sonic Team)	Game Boy Advance	Yes	Yes	Yes	
2001	Columns Crown	Puzzle	Sega (WOW Entertainment	Game Boy Advance	Yes	Yes	Yes	
2001	Confidential Mission	Light gun shooter	Sega (Hitmaker)	Dreamcast	Yes	Yes	Yes	
2001	Cosmic Smash	Action, Sports	Sega (Sega Rosso)	Dreamcast	Yes			
2001	Crazy Taxi 2	Driving	Sega (Hitmaker)	Dreamcast	Yes	Yes	Yes	
2001	Derby Tsuku 2	Sports	Sega (Smilebit), Land Ho!	Dreamcast	Yes			
2001	Ecco the Dolphin: Defender of the Future	Action	Appaloosa Interactive	PlayStation 2		Yes	Yes	
2001	Floigan Bros. Episode 1	Action	Visual Concepts	Dreamcast		Yes	Yes	
2001	Guru Guru Onsen 2	Tabletop	Sega (Overworks)	Dreamcast	Yes			
2001	Headhunter	Action	Amuze	Dreamcast		Yes		
2001	Hundred Swords	RTS	Sega (Smilebit)	Dreamcast	Yes			
2001	Hundred Swords	RTS	Sega (Smilebit)	Microsoft Windows	Yes	Yes	Yes	
2001	Love Hina: Smile Again	Adventure	Fortyfive	Dreamcast	Yes			
2001	Magic: The Gathering	CCG	Alfasystem	Dreamcast	Yes			
2001	NBA 2K2	Sports	Visual Concepts	Dreamcast	Yes	Yes	Yes	
2001	NFL 2K2	Sports	Visual Concepts	Dreamcast	Yes	Yes		
2001	NFL 2K2	Sports	Visual Concepts	PlayStation 2	Yes	Yes		
2001	Phantasy Star Online	Action RPG	Sega (Sonic Team)	Microsoft Windows	Yes			
2001	Paso Pico Doraemon: Time Machine de Daibouken!	Educational	Sega Toys	Microsoft Windows	Yes			
2001	Paso Pico Go! Go! Paso Pico Land Tanoshii Kodomo Zukan	Educational	Sega Toys	Microsoft Windows	Yes			
2001	Paso Pico McDonald's de Asobo!	Educational	Sega Toys	Microsoft Windows	Yes			
2001	Pro Yakyuu Team o Tsukurou! & Asobou!	Sports	Sega (Smilebit)	Dreamcast	Yes			
2001	Puyo Pop	Puzzle	Sega (Sonic Team), Caret House	Game Boy Advance	Yes	Yes	Yes	
2001	Rez	Rail shooter	Sega (United Game Artists)	Dreamcast	Yes		Yes	
2001	Rez	Rail shooter	Sega (United Game Artists)	PlayStation 2	Yes	Yes	Yes	
2001	Sakura Taisen 2	Adventure, Tactical RPG	Sega (Overworks), Red Entertainment	Microsoft Windows	Yes			
2001	Sakura Taisen 3	Adventure, Tactical RPG	Sega (Overworks), Red Entertainment	Dreamcast	Yes			
2001	Sakura Taisen GB2: Thunderbolt Sakusen	Adventure	Jupiter	Game Boy Color	Yes			
2001	Sega Bass Fishing	Simulation	Sega (Wow Entertainment)	Microsoft Windows	Yes	Yes		
2001	Sega Bass Fishing 2	Simulation	Sega (Wow Entertainment)	Dreamcast	Yes	Yes		
2001	Sega Marine Fishing	Simulation	Sega (Wow Entertainment)	Microsoft Windows	Yes		Yes	
2001	Segagaga	RPG	Sega (Hitmaker), Thunder Stone	Dreamcast	Yes			
2001	Sega Smash Pack	Compilation	Sega of America	Dreamcast	Yes			
2001	Shenmue II	Action adventure	Sega (AM2)	Dreamcast	Yes		Yes	
2001	Soccer Tsuku Tokudaigou 2: J.League Pro Soccer Club o Tsukurou!	Sports	Sega (Smilebit)	Dreamcast	Yes			
2001	Sports Jam	Sports	Sega (WOW Entertainment)	Dreamcast	Yes	Yes		
2001	Sonic Advance	Platform	Sega (Sonic Team), Dimps	Game Boy Advance	Yes	Yes	Yes	
2001	Sonic Adventure 2	Platform	Sega (Sonic Team USA)	Dreamcast	Yes	Yes	Yes	
2001	Sonic Adventure 2: Battle	Platform	Sega (Sonic Team USA)	GameCube	Yes	Yes	Yes	
2001	Super Monkey Ball	Platform	Sega (Amusement Vision)	GameCube	Yes	Yes	Yes	
2001	The House of the Dead 2	Light gun shooter	Sega (WOW Entertainment)	Microsoft Windows	Yes	Yes	Yes	
2001	Outtrigger (video game)	FPS, TPS	Sega (AM2)	Dreamcast	Yes	Yes	Yes	
2001	Vampire Night	Light gun shooter	Sega (WOW Entertainment), Namco	PlayStation 2	Yes	Yes	Yes	
2001	Virtua Tennis 2	Sports	Sega (Hitmaker)	Dreamcast	Yes	Yes	Yes	
2001	World Series Baseball 2K1	Sports	Sega (WOW Entertainment)	Dreamcast	Yes	Yes		
2001	Yu Suzuki Game Works Vol. 1	Compilation	Sega (AM2), Aspect	Dreamcast	Yes			
2002	Aero Elite: Combat Academy	Simulation	Sega (AM2)	PlayStation 2	Yes	Yes		
2002	Altered Beast: Guardian of the Realms	Action	Sega (WOW Entertainment), 3d6 Games	Game Boy Advance		Yes		
2002	Baseball Advance	Sports	Sega (Smilebit)	Game Boy Advance	Yes	Yes		
2002	Beach Spikers	Sports	Sega (AM2)	GameCube	Yes	Yes	Yes	
2002	Crazy Taxi	Driving	Strangelite, Sega (Hitmaker)	Microsoft Windows	Yes	Yes	Yes	
2002	Crazy Taxi 3: High Roller	Driving	Sega (Hitmaker)	Xbox	Yes	Yes	Yes	
2002	F355 Challenge	Racing	Sega (AM2)	PlayStation 2	Yes	Yes	Yes	
2002	Fushigi no Dungeon: Furai no Shiren Gaiden: Onnakenshi Asuka Kenzan!	RPG	Chunsoft	Dreamcast	Yes			
2002	Golden Axe	Action	Bandai	WonderSwan Color	Yes			
2002	Gunvalkyrie	TPS	Sega (Smilebit)	Xbox	Yes	Yes	Yes	
2002	Guru Guru Onsen 3	Tabletop	Sega (Overworks)	Dreamcast	Yes			
2002	Guru Guru Onsen	Tabletop	Sega (Overworks)	Microsoft Windows	Yes			
2002	Headhunter	Action	Amuze	PlayStation 2		Yes	Yes	
2002	Home Run King	Sports	Sega (WOW Entertainment)	GameCube		Yes		
2002	J.League Pro Soccer Club o Tsukurou!	Sports	Sega (Smilebit)	Microsoft Windows	Yes			
2002	Jet Set Radio Future	Platform	Sega (Smilebit)	Xbox	Yes	Yes	Yes	
2002	MiniMoni. Shakka to Tambourine! Dapyon!	Rhythm	Sega, ASCII	PlayStation	Yes			
2002	Panzer Dragoon Orta	Rail shooter	Sega (Smilebit)	Xbox	Yes	Yes	Yes	
2002	Phantasy Star Online Episode I & II	Action RPG	Sega (Sonic Team)	GameCube	Yes	Yes		
2002	Roommania #203	Adventure, Simulation	Sega (Wavemaster)	PlayStation 2	Yes			
2002	Sakura Taisen 4	Adventure, Tactial RPG	Sega (Overworks), Red Entertainment	Dreamcast	Yes			
2002	Sega Bass Fishing Duel	Simulation	Sega (WOW Entertainment)	PlayStation 2	Yes	Yes	Yes	
2002	Sega GT 2002	Racing	Sega (WOW Entertainment)	Xbox	Yes	Yes	Yes	
2002	Shinobi	Action	Sega (Overworks)	PlayStation 2	Yes	Yes	Yes	
2002	Space Channel 5	Rhythm	Sega (United Game Artists)	PlayStation 2	Yes	Yes		
2002	Space Channel 5 Part 2	Rhythm	Sega (United Game Artists)	Dreamcast	Yes			
2002	Space Channel 5 Part 2	Rhythm	Sega (United Game Artists)	PlayStation 2	Yes	Yes	Yes	
2002	Sega Rally Championship	Racing	Sega (Sega Rosso)	Game Boy Advance	Yes	Yes	Yes	
2002	Sega Soccer Slam	Sports	Black Box Games	PlayStation 2		Yes	Yes	
2002	Sega Soccer Slam	Sports	Black Box Games	Xbox		Yes	Yes	
2002	Sega Soccer Slam	Sports	Black Box Games	GameCube	Yes	Yes	Yes	
2002	Shenmue II	Action adventure	Sega (AM2)	Xbox		Yes	Yes	
2002	Shining Soul	Action RPG	Grasshoper Manufacture, Nextech	Game Boy Advance	Yes	Yes		
2002	Skies of Arcadia: Legends	RPG	Sega (Overworks)	GameCube	Yes	Yes		
2002	Soccer Tsuku 2002: J.League Pro Soccer Club o Tsukurou!	Sports, Simulation	Sega (Smliebit)	PlayStation 2	Yes			
2002	Super Monkey Ball 2	Platform	Sega (Amusement Vision)	GameCube	Yes	Yes	Yes	
2002	Super Monkey Ball Jr.	Platform	Realism, Sega (Amusement Vision)	Game Boy Advance		Yes	Yes	
2002	Sonic Advance 2	Platform	Sega (Sonic Team), Dimps	Game Boy Advance	Yes	Yes	Yes	
2002	Sonic Mega Collection	Compilation	Sega (Sonic Team), VR-1 Japan	GameCube	Yes	Yes	Yes	
2002	Switch	Adventure	Sega (Wavemaster)	PlayStation 2	Yes			
2002	The House of the Dead III	Light gun shooter	Sega (WOW Entertainment)	Xbox	Yes	Yes	Yes	
2002	The Pinball of the Dead	Action	Sega (WOW Entertainment)	Game Boy Advance	Yes	Yes		
2002	The Revenge of Shinobi	Action	3d6 Games	Game Boy Advance		Yes	Yes	
2002	ToeJam & Earl III: Mission to Earth	Action	Visual Concepts	Xbox		Yes	Yes	
2002	Typing Space Harrier	Educational	Sega	Microsoft Windows	Yes			
2002	NBA 2K2	Sports	Visual Concepts	PlayStation 2	Yes	Yes		
2002	NBA 2K2	Sports	Visual Concepts	GameCube		Yes		
2002	NBA 2K2	Sports	Visual Concepts	Xbox		Yes		
2002	NBA 2K3	Sports	Visual Concepts	PlayStation 2	Yes	Yes		
2002	NBA 2K3	Sports	Visual Concepts	GameCube		Yes		
2002	NBA 2K3	Sports	Visual Concepts	Xbox		Yes		
2002	NFL 2K2	Sports	Visual Concepts	Xbox		Yes		
2002	NCAA College Basketball 2K3	Sports	Visual Concepts	PlayStation 2		Yes		
2002	NCAA College Basketball 2K3	Sports	Visual Concepts	GameCube		Yes		
2002	NCAA College Basketball 2K3	Sports	Visual Concepts	Xbox		Yes		
2002	NFL 2K3	Sports	Visual Concepts	PlayStation 2	Yes	Yes		
2002	NFL 2K3	Sports	Visual Concepts	GameCube	Yes	Yes		
2002	NFL 2K3	Sports	Visual Concepts	Xbox	Yes	Yes		
2002	Online Games: Dai Guru Guru Onsen	Tabletop	Sega (Overworks)	PlayStation 2	Yes			
2002	Virtua Cop: Elite Edition	Light gun shooter	Riz	PlayStation 2	Yes		Yes	
2002	Virtua Fighter 4	Fighting	Sega (AM2)	PlayStation 2	Yes	Yes	Yes	
2002	Virtua Striker 3	Sports	Sega (Amusement Vision)	GameCube	Yes	Yes	Yes	
2002	Virtua Tennis	Sports	Strangelite, Sega (Hitmaker)	Microsoft Windows	Yes	Yes	Yes	
2002	Virtua Tennis 2	Sports	Tamsoft, Sega (Hitmaker)	PlayStation 2	Yes	Yes	Yes	
2002	World Series Baseball	Sports	Visual Concepts	Xbox		Yes		
2002	World Series Baseball 2K3	Sports	Visual Concepts	PlayStation 2		Yes		
2002	World Series Baseball 2K3	Sports	Visual Concepts	Xbox		Yes		
2003	Advanced Daisenryaku IV	Strategy	Chickenhead, Systemsoft	Microsoft Windows	Yes			
2003	Amazing Island	Mini games	Ancient	GameCube	Yes	Yes		
2003	Astro Boy: Omega Factor	Action	Sega (Hitmaker), Treasure	Game Boy Advance	Yes	Yes	Yes	
2003	Billy Hatcher and the Giant Egg	Platform	Sega (Sonic Team)	GameCube	Yes	Yes	Yes	
2003	Crazy Taxi: Catch a Ride	Driving	Graphic State	Game Boy Advance		Yes	Yes	
2003	Cyber Troopers Virtual-On Marz	Action, Fighting	Sega (Hitmaker)	PlayStation 2	Yes	Yes		
2003	Derby Tsuku 3: Derby Uma o Tsukurou!	Sports, Simulation	Sega (Smilebit), Land Ho!	PlayStation 2	Yes			
2003	Derby Tsuku 3: Derby Uma o Tsukurou!	Sports, Simulation	Sega (Smilebit), Land Ho!	GameCube	Yes			
2003	ESPN College Hoops	Sports	Visual Concepts	PlayStation 2		Yes		
2003	ESPN College Hoops	Sports	Visual Concepts	Xbox		Yes		
2003	ESPN NBA Basketball	Sports	Visual Concepts	PlayStation 2	Yes	Yes		
2003	ESPN NBA Basketball	Sports	Visual Concepts	Xbox	Yes	Yes		
2003	ESPN NFL Football	Sports	Visual Concepts	PlayStation 2	Yes	Yes		
2003	ESPN NFL Football	Sports	Visual Concepts	Xbox	Yes	Yes		
2003	F-Zero GX	Racing	Sega (Amusement Vision)	GameCube	Yes	Yes	Yes	
2003	Gekitou Pro Yakyuu	Sports	Sega (WOW Entertainment)	PlayStation 2	Yes			
2003	Gekitou Pro Yakyuu	Sports	Sega (WOW Entertainment)	GameCube	Yes			
2003	Initial D Special Stage	Racing	Sega (Sega Rosso)	PlayStation 2	Yes			
2003	New Roommania: Porori Seishun	Simulation	Sega (Wave Master)	PlayStation 2	Yes			
2003	Nightshade	Action	Sega (Overworks)	PlayStation 2	Yes	Yes	Yes	
2003	J.League Pro Soccer Club o Tsukurou! 3	Sports, Simulation	Sega (Smilebit)	PlayStation 2	Yes			
2003	Jet Set Radio	Action	Vicarious Visions	Game Boy Advance		Yes	Yes	
2003	Phantasy Star Online Episode I & II	Action RPG	Sega (Sonic Team)	Xbox	Yes	Yes	Yes	
2003	Phantasy Star Online Episode III: C.A.R.D. Revolution	CCG, RPG	Sega (Sonic Team)	GameCube	Yes	Yes	Yes	
2003	Pro Yakyuu Team o Tsukurou! 2	Sports, Simulation	Sega (Smilebit)	PlayStation 2	Yes			
2003	Pro Yakyuu Team o Tsukurou! 2003	Sports, Simulation	Sega (Smilebit)	PlayStation 2	Yes			
2003	Puyo Puyo Sun	Puzzle	Compile	PlayStation	Yes			
2003	Rent A Hero No.1	Action RPG	Sega, Aspect	Xbox	Yes			
2003	Sakura Taisen: Atsuki Chishio Ni	Adventure, Tactial RPG	Sega (Overworks), Red Entertainment	PlayStation 2	Yes			
2003	Sega Ages 2500 Series Vol. 1: Phantasy Star Generation: 1	RPG	3D Ages, JAM	PlayStation 2	Yes			
2003	Sega Ages 2500 Series Vol. 2: Monaco GP	Racing	3D Ages, Tamsoft	PlayStation 2	Yes			
2003	Sega Ages 2500 Series Vol. 3: Fantasy Zone	Shoot em' up	3D Ages, SIMS	PlayStation 2	Yes			
2003	Sega Ages 2500 Series Vol. 4: Space Harrier	Rail shooter	3D Ages, Tamsoft	PlayStation 2	Yes			
2003	Sega Ages 2500 Series Vol. 5: Golden Axe	Action	3D Ages, SIMS	PlayStation 2	Yes			
2003	Sega Ages 2500 Series Vol. 6: Ichini no Tant-R to Bonanza Bros.	Compilation	3D Ages, JAM	PlayStation 2	Yes			
2003	Sega Arcade Gallery	Compilation	Bits Studios	Game Boy Advance		Yes	Yes	
2003	Sega GT Online	Racing	Sega (WOW Entertainment)	Xbox	Yes	Yes	Yes	
2003	Shining Soul II	Action RPG	Grasshoper Studio, Nextech	Game Boy Advance	Yes	Yes		
2003	Sonic Adventure DX: Director's Cut	Platform	Sega (Sonic Team)	GameCube	Yes	Yes	Yes	
2003	Sonic Adventure DX: Director's Cut	Platform	Sega (Sonic Team)	Microsoft Windows	Yes	Yes	Yes	
2003	Sonic Heroes	Platform	Sega (Sonic Team)	PlayStation 2	Yes	Yes	Yes	
2003	Sonic Heroes	Platform	Sega (Sonic Team)	GameCube	Yes	Yes	Yes	
2003	Sonic Heroes	Platform	Sega (Sonic Team)	Xbox	Yes	Yes	Yes	
2003	Sonic Pinball Party	Action	Sega (Sonic Team)	Game Boy Advance	Yes	Yes	Yes	
2003	Space Channel 5: Ulala's Cosmic Attack	Rhythm	Art Co., Ltd.	Game Boy Advance		Yes	Yes	
2003	The Super Dimension Fortress Macross	Action	Sega (AM2)	PlayStation 2	Yes			
2003	The King of Route 66	Driving	Sega (AM2)	PlayStation 2		Yes	Yes	
2003	Otogi: Myth of Demons	Action	From Software	Xbox	Yes	Yes	Yes	
2003	Virtua Fighter: 10th Anniversary	Fighting	Sega (AM2)	PlayStation 2	Yes	Yes	Yes	
2003	Virtua Fighter 4 Evolution	Fighting	Sega (AM2)	PlayStation 2	Yes	Yes	Yes	
2004	Astro Boy	Action	Sega (Sonic Team)	PlayStation 2	Yes	Yes	Yes	
2004	Blood Will Tell: Tezuka Osamu's Dororo	Action	Sega (Sega WOW)	PlayStation 2	Yes	Yes	Yes	
2004	Crazy Taxi 3: High Roller	Driving	Strangelite, Sega (Hitmaker)	Microsoft Windows	Yes		Yes	
2004	Derby Tsuku 4: Derby Uma o Tsukurou!	Sports, Simulation	Sega (Smilebit), Land Ho!	PlayStation 2	Yes			
2004	Derby Owners Club Online	Sports, Simulation	Sega (Hitmaker)	Microsoft Windows	Yes			
2004	ESPN College Hoops 2K5	Sports	Visual Concepts	PlayStation 2		Yes		
2004	ESPN College Hoops 2K5	Sports	Visual Concepts	Xbox		Yes		
2004	ESPN Major League Baseball	Sports	Visual Concepts	PlayStation 2		Yes		
2004	ESPN Major League Baseball	Sports	Visual Concepts	Xbox		Yes		
2004	ESPN NBA 2K5	Sports	Visual Concepts	PlayStation 2	Yes	Yes		
2004	ESPN NBA 2K5	Sports	Visual Concepts	Xbox	Yes	Yes		
2004	ESPN NFL 2K5	Sports	Visual Concepts	PlayStation 2	Yes	Yes		
2004	ESPN NFL 2K5	Sports	Visual Concepts	Xbox	Yes	Yes		
2004	Feel the Magic: XY/XX	Mini games	Sega (Sonic Team)	Nintendo DS	Yes	Yes	Yes	
2004	Finny the Fish & the Seven Waters	Action	Sega (Sega WOW)	PlayStation 2	Yes	Yes		
2004	Football Manager 2005	Sports, Simulation	Sports Interactive	Microsoft Windows		Yes	Yes	
2004	Headhunter Redemption	Action	Amuze	PlayStation 2		Yes	Yes	
2004	Headhunter Redemption	Action	Amuze	Xbox		Yes	Yes	
2004	J.League Pro Soccer Club o Tsukurou! '04	Sports, Simulation	Sega (Smilebit)	PlayStation 2	Yes			
2004	Lilliput Oukoku: Lillimoni to Issho Puni!	Adventure	Sega (Sega WOW)	Game Boy Advance	Yes			
2004	NHL Eastside Hockey Manager	Sports, Simulation	Sports Interactive	Microsoft Windows		Yes	Yes	
2004	Phantasy Star Online Episode IV: Blue Burst	Action RPG, MMO	Sega (Sonic Team)	Microsoft Windows	Yes	Yes		
2004	Puyo Pop Fever	Puzzle	Sega (Sonic Team)	PlayStation 2	Yes		Yes	
2004	Puyo Pop Fever	Puzzle	Sega (Sonic Team)	GameCube	Yes	Yes	Yes	
2004	Puyo Pop Fever	Puzzle	Sega (Sonic Team)	Xbox	Yes		Yes	
2004	Puyo Pop Fever	Puzzle	Sega (Sonic Team)	Game Boy Advance	Yes		Yes	
2004	Puyo Pop Fever	Puzzle	Sega (Sonic Team)	Nintendo DS	Yes	Yes	Yes	
2004	Puyo Pop Fever	Puzzle	Sega (Sonic Team)	PlayStation Portable	Yes		Yes	
2004	Puyo Pop Fever	Puzzle	Sega (Sonic Team)	Microsoft Windows	Yes			
2004	Samurai Jack: The Shadow of Aku	Action	Adrenium Games	PlayStation 2		Yes	Yes	
2004	Samurai Jack: The Shadow of Aku	Action	Adrenium Games	GameCube		Yes	Yes	
2004	Sakura Taisen 3	Adventure, Tactial RPG	Sega (Sega WOW), Red Entertainment	PlayStation 2	Yes			
2004	Sakura Taisen Monogatari: Mysterious Paris	Adventure	Sega (Sega WOW), Red Entertainment	PlayStation 2	Yes			
2004	Sakura Taisen V Episode 0: Kouya no Samurai Musume	Adventure, Action RPG	Sega (Sega WOW), Red Entertainment	PlayStation 2	Yes			
2004	Sega Ages 2500 Series Vol. 8: Virtua Racing FlatOut	Racing	3D Ages, Vingt-et-un Systems	PlayStation 2	Yes			
2004	Sega Ages 2500 Series Vol. 9: Gain Ground	Action, Strategy	3D Ages, Warashi	PlayStation 2	Yes			
2004	Sega Ages 2500 Series Vol. 10: After Burner II	Rail shooter	3D Ages, Sims	PlayStation 2	Yes			
2004	Sega Ages 2500 Series Vol. 12: Puyo Puyo Tsuu Perfect Set	Puzzle	3D Ages, Enter	PlayStation 2	Yes			
2004	Sega Ages 2500 Series Vol. 13: OutRun	Driving	3D Ages, Sims	PlayStation 2	Yes			
2004	Sega Ages 2500 Series Vol. 14: Alien Syndrome	Action	3D Ages, h.a.n.d.	PlayStation 2	Yes			
2004	Sega Ages 2500 Series Vol. 15: Decathlete Collection	Sports	3D Ages, Vingt-et-un Systems	PlayStation 2	Yes			
2004	Sega Ages 2500 Series Vol. 16: Virtua Fighter 2	Fighting	Sega (AM2)	PlayStation 2	Yes			
2004	Sega Superstars	Mini games	Sega (Sonic Team)	PlayStation 2	Yes	Yes	Yes	
2004	Shining Force: Resurrection of the Dark Dragon	Tactial RPG	Sega (Amusement Vision), Climax	Game Boy Advance	Yes	Yes	Yes	
2004	Shining Tears	Action RPG	Nextech	PlayStation 2	Yes	Yes	Yes	
2004	Sonic Advance 3	Platform	Sega (Sonic Team), Dimps	Game Boy Advance	Yes	Yes	Yes	
2004	Sonic Battle	Fighting	Sega (Sonic Team)	Game Boy Advance	Yes	Yes	Yes	
2004	Sonic Heroes	Platform	Sega (Sonic Team)	Microsoft Windows	Yes	Yes	Yes	
2004	Sonic Mega Collection Plus	Compilation	Sega (Sonic Team), VR-1 Japan	PlayStation 2	Yes	Yes	Yes	
2004	Sonic Mega Collection Plus	Compilation	Sega (Sonic Team), VR-1 Japan	Xbox	Yes	Yes	Yes	
2004	Sonic Mega Collection Plus	Compilation	Sega (Sonic Team), VR-1 Japan	Microsoft Windows		Yes	Yes	
2004	The Typing of the Dead: Zombie Panic	Educational	Sega	PlayStation 2	Yes			
2004	Otogi 2: Immortal Warriors	Action	From Software	Xbox	Yes	Yes	Yes	
2004	OutRun 2	Driving	Sumo Digital, Sega (AM2)	Xbox	Yes	Yes	Yes	
2004	Virtua Quest	Action RPG	Sega (AM2)	PlayStation 2	Yes	Yes		
2004	Virtua Quest	Action RPG	Sega (AM2)	GameCube	Yes	Yes		
2005	Altered Beast	Action	Sega, Sega Shanghai Studio	PlayStation 2	Yes		Yes	
2005	Bleach Advance: Kurenai ni Somaru Soul Society	Fighting	Alpha Unit	Game Boy Advance	Yes			
2005	Bleach GC Tasogare ni Mamieru Shinigami	Fighting	Polygon Magic	GameCube	Yes			
2005	Code of the Samurai	Action	Red Entertainment	PlayStation 2	Yes		Yes	
2005	Condemned: Criminal Origins	Horror	Monolith Productions	Xbox 360	Yes	Yes	Yes	
2005	Derby Uma o Tsukurou! 5	Sports, Simulation	Sega, Land Ho!	PlayStation 2	Yes			
2005	Fist of the North Star	Fighting	Arc System Works	PlayStation 2	Yes			
2005	Football Manager 2006	Sports	Sports Interactive	Microsoft Windows	Yes	Yes	Yes	
2005	Gunstar Super Heroes	Action	Treasure	Game Boy Advance	Yes	Yes	Yes	
2005	Iron Phoenix	Action	Sammy Studios USA, Interserv International	Xbox		Yes		
2005	Jissen Pachi-Slot Hisshouhou! Aladdin II Evolution	Gambling, Simulation	Sammy	PlayStation 2	Yes			
2005	Jissen Pachinko Hisshouhou! CR Hokuto no Ken	Gambling, Simulation	Sammy	PlayStation 2	Yes			
2005	Jissen Pachi-Slot Hisshouhou! DS: Pachi-Slot Hokuto no Ken	Gambling, Simulation	Sammy	Nintendo DS	Yes			
2005	Jissen Pachi-Slot Hisshouhou! Onimusha 3	Gambling, Simulation	Sammy	PlayStation 2	Yes			
2005	Brain Trainer Portable	Educational	Land Ho!	PlayStation Portable	Yes			
2005	Konchuu Ouja Mushiking: Greatest Champion e no Michi	CCG, RPG	Sega	Game Boy Advance	Yes			
2005	Konchuu Ouja Mushiking: Greatest Champion e no Michi DS	CCG, RPG	Sega	Nintendo DS	Yes			
2005	NHL Eastside Hockey Manager	Sports	Sports Interactive	Microsoft Windows		Yes	Yes	
2005	Pro Yakyuu Team o Tsukurou! 3	Sports	Sega	PlayStation 2	Yes			
2005	Puyo Puyo Fever 2	Puzzle	Sega (Sonic Team)	PlayStation 2	Yes			
2005	Puyo Puyo Fever 2	Puzzle	Sega (Sonic Team)	Nintendo DS	Yes			
2005	Puyo Puyo Fever 2	Puzzle	Sega (Sonic Team)	PlayStation Portable	Yes			
2005	Sakura Taisen 3	Adventure, Tactical RPG	Sega, Red Entertainment	Microsoft Windows	Yes			
2005	Sakura Wars: So Long, My Love	Adventure, Tactical RPG	Sega, Red Entertainment	PlayStation 2	Yes			
2005	Sega Ages 2500 Series Vol. 17: Phantasy Star Generation:2	RPG	JAM	PlayStation 2	Yes			
2005	Sega Ages 2500 Series Vol. 18: Dragon Force	Tactical RPG	MBI	PlayStation 2	Yes			
2005	Sega Ages 2500 Series Vol. 19: Fighting Vipers	Fighting	Sega (AM2)	PlayStation 2	Yes			
2005	Sega Ages 2500 Series Vol. 20: Space Harrier Complete Collection	Compilation	M2	PlayStation 2	Yes			
2005	Sega Ages 2500 Series Vol. 21: SDI & Quartet	Compilation	M2	PlayStation 2	Yes			
2005	Sega Ages 2500 Series Vol. 23: Sega Memorial Selection	Compilation	JAM	PlayStation 2	Yes			
2005	Sega Classics Collection	Compilation	Conspiracy Entertainment	PlayStation 2		Yes	Yes	
2005	Sega Casino	Gambling, Simulation	Sega	Nintendo DS		Yes	Yes	
2005	Shining Force Neo	Action RPG	Neverland	PlayStation 2	Yes	Yes		
2005	Shadow the Hedgehog	Platform	Sega (Sonic Team USA)	PlayStation 2	Yes	Yes	Yes	
2005	Shadow the Hedgehog	Platform	Sega (Sonic Team USA)	GameCube	Yes	Yes	Yes	
2005	Shadow the Hedgehog	Platform	Sega (Sonic Team USA)	Xbox	Yes	Yes	Yes	
2005	Spartan: Total Warrior	Action	Creative Assembly	PlayStation 2	Yes	Yes	Yes	
2005	Spartan: Total Warrior	Action	Creative Assembly	GameCube		Yes	Yes	
2005	Spartan: Total Warrior	Action	Creative Assembly	Xbox		Yes	Yes	
2005	Spikeout: Battle Street	Action	Sega, Dimps	Xbox	Yes	Yes	Yes	
2005	Sonic Gems Collection	Compilation	Sega (Sonic Team), H.I.C. Software, Sega AM2, COMOLINK Inc., Traveller's Tales	PlayStation 2	Yes		Yes	
2005	Sonic Gems Collection	Compilation	Sega (Sonic Team), H.I.C. Software, Sega AM2, COMOLINK Inc., Traveller's Tales	GameCube	Yes	Yes	Yes	
2005	Sonic Rush	Platform	Sega (Sonic Team), Dimps	Nintendo DS	Yes	Yes	Yes	
2005	Super Monkey Ball: Touch & Roll	Platform, Puzzle	Sega	Nintendo DS	Yes	Yes	Yes	
2005	Super Monkey Ball Deluxe	Platform, Puzzle	Sega	PlayStation 2	Yes	Yes	Yes	
2005	Super Monkey Ball Deluxe	Platform, Puzzle	Sega	Xbox	Yes	Yes	Yes	
2005	The House of the Dead III	Light gun shooter	Sega	Microsoft Windows	Yes		Yes	
2005	The Rub Rabbits!	Mini game compilation	Sega (Sonic Team)	Nintendo DS	Yes	Yes	Yes	
2005	The Matrix Online	RPG, MMO	Monolith Productions	Microsoft Windows		Yes	Yes	
2005	Virtua Tennis World Tour	Sports	Sumo Digital	PlayStation Portable	Yes	Yes	Yes	
2005	World Snooker Championship 2005	Sports	Blade Interactive	PlayStation 2			Yes	
2005	World Snooker Championship 2005	Sports	Blade Interactive	Xbox			Yes	
2005	World Snooker Championship 2005	Sports	Blade Interactive	PlayStation Portable			Yes	
2005	World Snooker Championship 2005	Sports	Blade Interactive	Microsoft Windows			Yes	
2005	Yakuza	Action adventure	Sega	PlayStation 2	Yes	Yes	Yes	
2006	Advanced Daisenryaku 5	Strategy	Chickenhead, Systemsoft	Microsoft Windows	Yes			
2006	Billy Hatcher and the Giant Egg	Platform	Sega Europe	Microsoft Windows			Yes	
2006	Black Jack: Tori no Hen	Adventure	Genki	Nintendo DS	Yes			
2006	Bleach: The Blade of Fate	Fighting	Treasure	Nintendo DS	Yes	Yes	Yes	
2006	Charlotte's Web	Platform	Backbone Entertainment	Game Boy Advance		Yes	Yes	
2006	Charlotte's Web	Platform	Backbone Entertainment	Nintendo DS		Yes	Yes	
2006	Charlotte's Web	Platform	Backbone Entertainment	Microsoft Windows		Yes	Yes	
2006	Chromehounds	Action, Simulator	From Software	Xbox 360	Yes	Yes	Yes	
2006	Condemned: Criminal Origins	Horror	Monolith Productions	Microsoft Windows		Yes	Yes	
2006	Doraemon: Nobita's Dinosaur 2006 DS	CCG, RPG	Sega	Nintendo DS	Yes			
2006	Football Manager 2006	Sports	Sports Interactive	Xbox 360			Yes	
2006	Football Manager Handheld	Sports	Sports Interactive	PlayStation Portable			Yes	
2006	Full Auto	Action, Driving	Pseudo Interactive	Xbox 360	Yes	Yes	Yes	
2006	Full Auto 2: Battlelines	Action, Driving	Pseudo Interactive	PlayStation 3		Yes	Yes	
2006	Initial D: Street Stage	Racing	Sega	PlayStation Portable	Yes			
2006	Jissen Pachinko Hisshouhou! CR Salaryman Kintarou	Gambling, Simulation	Sammy	PlayStation 2	Yes			
2006	Jissen Pachi-Slot Hisshouhou! DS: Aladdin II Evolution	Gambling, Simulation	Sammy	PlayStation 2	Yes			
2006	Jissen Pachi-Slot Hisshouhou! Pachi-Slot Hokuto no Ken SE	Gambling, Simulation	Sammy	Nintendo DS	Yes			
2006	Jissen Pachi-Slot Hisshouhou! Ore no Sora	Gambling, Simulation	Sammy	PlayStation 2	Yes			
2006	Jissen Pachi-Slot Hisshouhou! Ultraman Club ST	Gambling, Simulation	Sammy	PlayStation 2	Yes			
2006	Jukugon	Educational	Sega	PlayStation Portable	Yes			
2006	Kamaitachi no Yoru 2: Tokubetsu Hen	Adventure	Chunsoft	PlayStation Portable	Yes			
2006	Kamaitachi no Yoru ×3	Adventure	Chunsoft	PlayStation 2	Yes			
2006	Kanji Trainer Portable	Educational	Land Ho!	PlayStation Portable	Yes			
2006	Machi: Unmei no Kousaten Tokubetsu Hen	Adventure	Chunsoft	PlayStation Portable	Yes			
2006	Medieval II: Total War	RTS	Creative Assembly	Microsoft Windows	Yes	Yes	Yes	
2006	Mind Quiz	Educational	Land Ho!	PlayStation Portable	Yes	Yes	Yes	
2006	Mind Quiz: Your Brain Coach	Educational	Sega	Nintendo DS	Yes	Yes	Yes	
2006	Miyasato Miyoshi Kyoudai Naizou: Sega Golf Club	Sports	Sega	PlayStation 3	Yes			
2006	Mystery Dungeon: Shiren the Wanderer	RPG	Chunsoft	Nintendo DS	Yes	Yes	Yes	
2006	NHL Eastside Hockey Manager 2007	Sports, Simulation	Sports Interactive	Microsoft Windows		Yes	Yes	
2006	Nou ni Kaikan: Aha Taiken!	Educational	Land Ho!	PlayStation Portable	Yes			
2006	Nou ni Kaikan: Minna de Aha Taiken!	Educational	Land Ho!	PlayStation Portable	Yes			
2006	Ore no Dungeon	RPG	Climax	PlayStation Portable	Yes			
2006	Phantasy Star Universe	Action RPG	Sega (Sonic Team)	PlayStation 2	Yes	Yes	Yes	
2006	Phantasy Star Universe	Action RPG	Sega (Sonic Team)	Xbox 360	Yes	Yes	Yes	
2006	Phantasy Star Universe	Action RPG	Sega (Sonic Team)	Microsoft Windows	Yes	Yes	Yes	
2006	Planetarium Creator Ohira Takayuki Kanshuu Homestar Portable	Educational	Sega Toys	PlayStation Portable	Yes			
2006	Pro Soccer Club o Tsukurou! Europe Championship	Sports	Sega	PlayStation 2	Yes		Yes	
2006	Puyo Puyo! 15th Anniversary	Puzzle	Sega (Sonic Team)	Nintendo DS	Yes			
2006	Sakura Taisen 1&2	Adventure, Tactical RPG	Sega, Red Entertainment	PlayStation Portable	Yes			
2006	Sega Ages 2500 Series Vol. 22: Advanced Daisenryaku: Deutsch Dengeki Sakusen	Strategy	Chickenhead	PlayStation 2	Yes			
2006	Sega Ages 2500 Series Vol. 24: Last Bronx: Tokyo Bangaichi	Fighting	M2	PlayStation 2	Yes			
2006	Sega Ages 2500 Series Vol. 25: Gunstar Heroes Treasure Box	Compilation	M2	PlayStation 2	Yes			
2006	Sega Ages 2500 Series Vol. 26: Dynamite Deka	Action	Sega Shanghai Studio	PlayStation 2	Yes			
2006	Sega Ages 2500 Series Vol. 27: Panzer Dragoon	Rail shooter	Land Ho!	PlayStation 2	Yes			
2006	Sega Ages 2500 Series Vol. 28: Tetris Collection	Puzzle	M2	PlayStation 2	Yes			
2006	Sega Genesis Collection	Compilation	Digital Eclipse	PlayStation 2		Yes	Yes	
2006	Sega Rally 2006	Racing	Sega	PlayStation 2	Yes			
2006	Sega Rally Championship	Racing	M2	PlayStation 2	Yes			
2006	Shining Tears Material Collection	Non-game	Nextech	Microsoft Windows	Yes			
2006	Sonic Riders	Racing	Sega (Sonic Team)	PlayStation 2	Yes	Yes	Yes	
2006	Sonic Riders	Racing	Sega (Sonic Team)	GameCube	Yes	Yes	Yes	
2006	Sonic Riders	Racing	Sega (Sonic Team)	Xbox	Yes	Yes	Yes	
2006	Sonic Riders	Racing	Sega (Sonic Team)	Microsoft Windows		Yes	Yes	
2006	Sonic Rivals	Platform, Racing	Backbone Entertainment, Sega (Sonic Team USA)	PlayStation Portable		Yes	Yes	
2006	Sonic the Hedgehog 2006	Platform	Sega (Sonic Team)	PlayStation 3	Yes	Yes	Yes	
2006	Sonic the Hedgehog 2006	Platform	Sega (Sonic Team)	Xbox 360	Yes	Yes	Yes	
2006	Sonic the Hedgehog: Genesis	Platform	Sega	Game Boy Advance		Yes		
2006	Super Monkey Ball Adventure	Platform	Travellers Tales	PlayStation 2		Yes	Yes	
2006	Super Monkey Ball Adventure	Platform	Travellers Tales	GameCube		Yes	Yes	
2006	Super Monkey Ball Adventure	Platform	Travellers Tales	PlayStation Portable		Yes	Yes	
2006	Super Monkey Ball Banana Blitz	Platform, Puzzle	Sega	Wii	Yes	Yes	Yes	
2006	Tenka-bito	RTS	Shade	PlayStation 2	Yes			
2006	Oshare Majo: Love and Berry DS	CCG, Simulation	Sega	Nintendo DS	Yes			
2006	Outrun 2006: Coast 2 Coast	Racing	Sumo Digital	PlayStation 2	Yes	Yes	Yes	
2006	Outrun 2006: Coast 2 Coast	Racing	Sumo Digital	Xbox		Yes	Yes	
2006	Outrun 2006: Coast 2 Coast	Racing	Sumo Digital	PlayStation Portable		Yes	Yes	
2006	Outrun 2006: Coast 2 Coast	Racing	Sumo Digital	Microsoft Windows		Yes	Yes	
2006	Virtua Pro Football	Sports	Sega	PlayStation 2	Yes		Yes	
2006	Yakuza 2	Action adventure	Sega	PlayStation 2	Yes	Yes	Yes	
2007	After Burner: Black Falcon	Rail shooter	Planet Moon Studios	PlayStation Portable		Yes	Yes	
2007	Alien Syndrome	Action	Totally Games	Wii		Yes	Yes	
2007	Alien Syndrome	Action	Totally Games	PlayStation Portable		Yes	Yes	
2007	Appleseed EX	Action	DreamFactory	PlayStation 2	Yes			
2007	Brain Assist	Educational	Sega	Nintendo DS	Yes	Yes	Yes	
2007	Bleach: Dark Souls	Fighting	Treasure	Nintendo DS	Yes	Yes	Yes	
2007	Bleach: Shattered Blade	Fighting	Polygon Magic	Wii	Yes	Yes	Yes	
2007	Crazy Taxi: Fare Wars	Driving	Sniper Studios	PlayStation Portable	Yes	Yes	Yes	
2007	Crush	Puzzle	Zoë Mode	PlayStation Portable		Yes	Yes	
2007	Dinosaur King	CCG, RPG	Sega	Nintendo DS	Yes	Yes	Yes	
2007	Doraemon: Nobita no Shin Makai Daibouken DS	CCG, RPG	Sega	Nintendo DS	Yes			
2007	Doraemon Wii: Himitsu Dougu Ou Ketteisen!	Party	8ing	Wii	Yes			
2007	Ecco the Dolphin	Action	Backbone Entertainment	Xbox 360	Yes	Yes	Yes	
2007	Football Manager 2008	Sports, Simulation	Sports Interactive	Microsoft Windows	Yes	Yes	Yes	
2007	Football Manager 2008	Sports, Simulation	Sports Interactive	Xbox 360			Yes	
2007	Football Manager Handheld 2008	Sports, Simulation	Sports Interactive	PlayStation Portable			Yes	
2007	Ghost Squad	Light gun shooter	Polygon Magic, Sega (AM2)	Wii	Yes	Yes	Yes	
2007	Golden Axe	Action	Backbone Entertainment	Xbox 360	Yes	Yes	Yes	
2007	Guilty Gear XX Slash	Fighting	Arc System Works	PlayStation 2	Yes			
2007	J.League Pro Soccer Club o Tsukurou! 5	Sports, Simulation	Sega	PlayStation 2	Yes			
2007	Jissen Pachinko Hisshouhou! CR Aladdin Destiny EX	Gambling, Simulation	Sammy	PlayStation 2	Yes			
2007	Jissen Pachi-Slot Hisshouhou! Hokuto no Ken 2	Gambling, Simulation	Sammy	PlayStation 2	Yes			
2007	Jissen Pachinko Hisshouhou! CR Sakura Taisen	Gambling, Simulation	Sammy	PlayStation 2	Yes			
2007	Jissen Pachi-Slot Hisshouhou! Mister Magic Neo	Gambling, Simulation	Sammy	PlayStation 2	Yes			
2007	Kaseki Play	Simulation	Sega, Mobile & Game Studio Inc.	Microsoft Windows	Yes			
2007	Kouchuu Ouja: Mushi King Super Collection	CCG, RPG	Sega	Nintendo DS	Yes			
2007	Mainichi Shinbun 1000 Dai News	Educational	Land Ho!	Nintendo DS	Yes			
2007	Mario & Sonic at the Olympic Games	Sports	Sega	Wii	Yes	Yes	Yes	
2007	Mite Kiite Nou de Kanjite Crossword Tengoku	Educational	Climax	Nintendo DS	Yes			
2007	NiGHTS: Journey of Dreams	Action	Sega (Sonic Team)	Wii	Yes	Yes	Yes	
2007	Phantasy Star Universe: Ambition of the Illuminus	Action RPG	Sega (Sonic Team)	PlayStation 2	Yes	Yes	Yes	
2007	Phantasy Star Universe: Ambition of the Illuminus	Action RPG	Sega (Sonic Team)	Xbox 360	Yes	Yes	Yes	
2007	Phantasy Star Universe: Ambition of the Illuminus	Action RPG	Sega (Sonic Team)	Microsoft Windows	Yes	Yes	Yes	
2007	PictoImage	Educational	Skonec	Nintendo DS	Yes	Yes	Yes	
2007	Puyo Puyo! 15th Anniversary	Puzzle	Sega (Sonic Team)	PlayStation 2	Yes			
2007	Puyo Puyo! 15th Anniversary	Puzzle	Sega (Sonic Team)	PlayStation Portable	Yes			
2007	Puyo Puyo! 15th Anniversary	Puzzle	Sega (Sonic Team)	Wii	Yes			
2007	Saitou Takashi no DS de Yomu Sansyoku Ballpen Meisaku Jyuku	Educational	Sega	Nintendo DS	Yes			
2007	Sangokushi Taisen DS	CCG, RTS	Sega, Alpha Unit	Nintendo DS	Yes			
2007	Seaman 2: Peking Genjin Ikusei Kit	Simulation	Vivarium	PlayStation 2	Yes			
2007	Sega Ages 2500 Series Vol. 29: Monster World Complete Collection	Compilation	M2	PlayStation 2	Yes			
2007	Sega Ages 2500 Series Vol. 30: Galaxy Force II: Special Extended Edition	Compilation	M2	PlayStation 2	Yes			
2007	Sega Ages 2500 Series Vol. 31: Dennou Senki Virtual On	Action, Fighting	M2	PlayStation 2	Yes			
2007	Sega Rally Revo	Racing	Sega Racing Studio	PlayStation 3	Yes	Yes	Yes	
2007	Sega Rally Revo	Racing	Sega Racing Studio	Xbox 360	Yes	Yes	Yes	
2007	Sega Rally Revo	Racing	Sega Racing Studio	Microsoft Windows	Yes	Yes	Yes	
2007	Sega Rally Revo	Racing	Bugbear Entertainment	PlayStation Portable	Yes	Yes	Yes	
2007	Shikaku Kentei DS	Educational	Land Ho!	Nintendo DS	Yes			
2007	Shining Force EXA	Action RPG	Neverland	PlayStation 2	Yes	Yes		
2007	Shining Wind	Action RPG	Nextech	PlayStation 2	Yes			
2007	Streets of Rage 2	Action	Backbone Entertainment	Xbox 360	Yes	Yes	Yes	
2007	Sonic and the Secret Rings	Platform	Sega (Sonic Team)	Wii	Yes	Yes	Yes	
2007	Sonic Rush Adventure	Platform	Sega (Sonic Team), Dimps	Nintendo DS	Yes	Yes	Yes	
2007	Sonic Rivals 2	Platform, Racing	Backbone Entertainment, Sega (Sonic Team USA)	PlayStation Portable		Yes	Yes	
2007	Sonic the Hedgehog	Platform	Backbone Entertainment	Xbox 360	Yes	Yes	Yes	
2007	Sonic the Hedgehog 2	Platform	Backbone Entertainment	Xbox 360	Yes	Yes	Yes	
2007	The Golden Compass	Action	Shiny Entertainment	PlayStation 3		Yes	Yes	
2007	The Golden Compass	Action	Shiny Entertainment	Xbox 360		Yes	Yes	
2007	The Golden Compass	Action	Shiny Entertainment	PlayStation 2		Yes	Yes	
2007	The Golden Compass	Action	Shiny Entertainment	PlayStation Portable		Yes	Yes	
2007	The Golden Compass	Action	Shiny Entertainment	Microsoft Windows		Yes	Yes	
2007	The Golden Compass	Action	Artificial Mind & Intelligence	Nintendo DS	Yes	Yes	Yes	
2007	Touch Darts	Simulation	Full Fat	Nintendo DS		Yes	Yes	
2007	Onsei Kanjou Sokuteiki: Kokoro Scan	Educational	Sega	Nintendo DS	Yes			
2007	Universe at War: Earth Assault	RTS	Petroglyph Games	Microsoft Windows		Yes	Yes	
2007	World Snooker Championship 2007	Sports	Blade Interactive	PlayStation 2			Yes	
2007	World Snooker Championship 2007	Sports	Blade Interactive	PlayStation Portable			Yes	
2007	World Snooker Championship 2007	Sports	Blade Interactive	Xbox 360			Yes	
2007	Virtua Fighter 5	Fighting	Sega (AM2)	PlayStation 3	Yes	Yes	Yes	
2007	Virtua Fighter 5	Fighting	Sega (AM2)	Xbox 360	Yes	Yes	Yes	
2007	Virtua Tennis 3	Sports	Sega	PlayStation 3	Yes	Yes	Yes	
2007	Virtua Tennis 3	Sports	Sumo Digital, Sega	Xbox 360		Yes	Yes	
2007	Virtua Tennis 3	Sports	Sumo Digital, Sega	PlayStation Portable		Yes	Yes	
2007	Virtua Tennis 3	Sports	Sumo Digital, Sega	Microsoft Windows		Yes	Yes	
2008	428: Fuusa Sareta Shibuya de	Adventure	Chunsoft	Wii	Yes			
2008	Beijing 2008	Sports	Eurocom	PlayStation 3	Yes	Yes	Yes	
2008	Beijing 2008	Sports	Eurocom	Xbox 360	Yes	Yes	Yes	
2008	Beijing 2008	Sports	Eurocom	Microsoft Windows		Yes	Yes	
2008	Blazer Drive	CCG, RPG	Sega	Nintendo DS	Yes			
2008	Bleach: The 3rd Phantom	Tactical RPG	Tomcreate	Nintendo DS	Yes	Yes	Yes	
2008	Bleach: Versus Crusade	Fighting	Treasure	Wii	Yes			
2008	Condemned 2: Bloodshot	FPS	Monolith Productions	PlayStation 3		Yes	Yes	
2008	Condemned 2: Bloodshot	FPS	Monolith Productions	Xbox 360		Yes	Yes	
2008	Doraemon: Nobita and the Green Giant Legend DS	Platform	Inti Creates	Nintendo DS	Yes			
2008	Dramatic Dungeon: Sakura Taisen	Adventure, RPG	Sega, Red Entertainment, Neverland	Nintendo DS	Yes			
2008	Football Manager 2009	Sports, Simulation	Sports Interactive	Microsoft Windows		Yes	Yes	
2008	Football Manager Handheld 2009	Sports, Simulation	Sports Interactive	PlayStation Portable			Yes	
2008	Shiren the Wanderer	RPG	Chunsoft	Wii	Yes	Yes		
2008	Fushigi no Dungeon: Fuurai no Shiren DS 2: Sabaku no Majou	RPG	Chunsoft	Nintendo DS	Yes			
2008	Golden Axe: Beast Rider	Action	Secret Level	PlayStation 3		Yes	Yes	
2008	Golden Axe: Beast Rider	Action	Secret Level	Xbox 360		Yes	Yes	
2008	Happy Tree Friends: False Alarm	Action, Puzzle	Stainless Games	Xbox 360		Yes	Yes	
2008	Happy Tree Friends: False Alarm	Action, Puzzle	Stainless Games	Microsoft Windows		Yes	Yes	
2008	Imabikisou: Kaimei Hen	Adventure	Chunsoft	PlayStation 3	Yes			
2008	Initial D: Extreme Stage	Racing	Sega, cavia	PlayStation 3	Yes			
2008	Iron Man	Action	Secret Level	PlayStation 3		Yes	Yes	
2008	Iron Man	Action	Secret Level	Xbox 360		Yes	Yes	
2008	Iron Man	Action	Secret Level	Microsoft Windows		Yes	Yes	
2008	Iron Man	Action	Artificial Mind & Movement	Nintendo DS		Yes	Yes	
2008	Iron Man	Action	Artificial Mind & Movement	PlayStation Portable		Yes	Yes	
2008	Kaite Oboeru Doragana	Educational	Sega	Nintendo DS	Yes			
2008	Let's Catch	Simulation	Prope	Wii	Yes	Yes	Yes	
2008	Let's Tap	Mini games	Prope	Wii	Yes	Yes	Yes	
2008	Mario & Sonic at the Olympic Games	Sports	Sega	Nintendo DS	Yes	Yes	Yes	
2008	Miburii & Teburii	Puzzle	Climax	Wii	Yes			
2008	NiGHTS Into Dreams...	Action	Sega Shanghai Studio	PlayStation 2	Yes			
2008	Phantasy Star Portable	Action RPG	Sega, Alfa System	PlayStation Portable	Yes	Yes	Yes	
2008	Phantasy Star Zero	Action RPG	Sega	Nintendo DS	Yes	Yes	Yes	
2008	Pro Soccer Club o Tsukurou! Online	Sports, Simulation	Sega	Microsoft Windows	Yes			
2008	Pro Yakyuu Team o Tsukurou!	Sports, Simulation	Sega	Nintendo DS	Yes			
2008	Ryu ga Gotoku Kenzan!	Action adventure	Sega	PlayStation 3	Yes			
2008	Samba de Amigo	Rhythm	Gearbox Software	Wii	Yes	Yes	Yes	
2008	Sands of Destruction	RPG	imageepoche	Nintendo DS	Yes	Yes		
2008	Sangokushi Taisen Ten	CCG, RTS	Sega, Alpha Unit	Nintendo DS	Yes			
2008	Sega Ages 2500 Series Vol. 32: Phantasy Star Complete Collection	Compilation	M2	PlayStation 2	Yes			
2008	Sega Ages 2500 Series Vol. 33: Fantasy Zone Complete Collection	Compilation	M2	PlayStation 2	Yes			
2008	Sega Bass Fishing	Simulation	Sims	Wii	Yes	Yes	Yes	
2008	Sega Splash! Golf	Sports	Sega	Microsoft Windows	Yes			
2008	Sega Superstars Tennis	Sports	Sumo Digital	PlayStation 3		Yes	Yes	
2008	Sega Superstars Tennis	Sports	Sumo Digital	Xbox 360		Yes	Yes	
2008	Sega Superstars Tennis	Sports	Sumo Digital	Wii		Yes	Yes	
2008	Sega Superstars Tennis	Sports	Sumo Digital	PlayStation 2		Yes	Yes	
2008	Sega Superstars Tennis	Sports	Sumo Digital	Nintendo DS		Yes	Yes	
2008	Sega Superstars Tennis	Sports	Sumo Digital	Microsoft Windows		Yes	Yes	
2008	Shiseido Beauty Solution Kaihatsu Center Kanshuu: Project Beauty	Non-game	Sega	Nintendo DS	Yes			
2008	Space Siege	Action RPG	Gas Powered Games	Microsoft Windows		Yes	Yes	
2008	Soccer Tsuku DS: Touch and Direct	Sports	Sega	Nintendo DS	Yes			
2008	Sonic Chronicles: The Dark Brotherhood	RPG	Bioware	Nintendo DS	Yes	Yes	Yes	
2008	Sonic Riders: Zero Gravity	Racing	Sega (Sonic Team)	Wii	Yes	Yes	Yes	
2008	Sonic Riders: Zero Gravity	Racing	Sega (Sonic Team)	PlayStation 2		Yes	Yes	
2008	Sonic Unleashed	Platform	Sega (Sonic Team)	PlayStation 3	Yes	Yes	Yes	
2008	Sonic Unleashed	Platform	Sega (Sonic Team)	Xbox 360	Yes	Yes	Yes	
2008	Sonic Unleashed	Platform	Sega (Sonic Team)	Wii	Yes	Yes	Yes	
2008	Sonic Unleashed	Platform	Sega (Sonic Team)	PlayStation 2		Yes	Yes	
2008	The Club	TPS	Bizarre Creations	PlayStation 3		Yes	Yes	
2008	The Club	TPS	Bizarre Creations	Xbox 360		Yes	Yes	
2008	The Club	TPS	Bizarre Creations	Microsoft Windows		Yes	Yes	
2008	The House of the Dead 2 & 3 Return	Light gun shooter	Sega	Wii	Yes	Yes	Yes	
2008	The Incredible Hulk	Action	Edge of Reality	PlayStation 2		Yes	Yes	
2008	The Incredible Hulk	Action	Edge of Reality	PlayStation 3		Yes	Yes	
2008	The Incredible Hulk	Action	Edge of Reality	Wii		Yes	Yes	
2008	The Incredible Hulk	Action	Edge of Reality	Xbox 360		Yes	Yes	
2008	The Incredible Hulk	Action	Edge of Reality	Microsoft Windows		Yes	Yes	
2008	The Incredible Hulk	Action	Amaze Entertainment	Nintendo DS		Yes	Yes	
2008	The Typing of the Dead 2	Educational	Sega	Microsoft Windows	Yes			
2008	Thunder Force VI	Shoot em' up	Sega, Gulti	PlayStation 2	Yes			
2008	Touch de Zuno! DS	Educational	Sega	Nintendo DS	Yes			
2008	Oshiri Kajiri Mushi no Rhythm Lesson DS: Kawai Ongaku Kyoushitsu Kanshuu	Rhythm	Sega	Nintendo DS	Yes			
2008	U-Can Pen Ji Training DS	Educational	Sega	Nintendo DS	Yes			
2008	Universe at War: Earth Assault	Strategy	Petroglyph Games	Xbox 360		Yes	Yes	
2008	Valkyria Chronicles	Strategy	Sega	PlayStation 3	Yes	Yes	Yes	
2008	Viking: Battle for Asgard	Action adventure	Creative Assembly	Xbox 360		Yes	Yes	
2008	Viking: Battle for Asgard	Action adventure	Creative Assembly	PlayStation 3		Yes	Yes	
2008	Yume Neko DS	Simulation	Sega	Nintendo DS	Yes			
2008	Zombie Shiki - Eigo Ryoku Sosei Jutsu: English of the Dead	Educational	Sega, Now Production	Nintendo DS	Yes			
2009	7th Dragon	RPG	imageepoch	Nintendo DS	Yes			
2009	Altered Beast	Action	Backbone Entertainment	Xbox 360	Yes	Yes	Yes	
2009	Bayonetta	Action	Platinum Games	Xbox 360	Yes	Yes	Yes	
2009	Bayonetta	Action	Platinum Games, Nextech	PlayStation 3	Yes	Yes	Yes	
2009	Bleach DS 4th: Flame Bringer	Action	Dimps	Nintendo DS	Yes			
2009	Card de Asobu! Hajimete no DS	Educational	Sega	Nintendo DS	Yes			
2009	Chindōchū!! Pōru no Daibōken	Platform	Sega, Mobile & Game Studio Inc.	Wii	Yes			
2009	Comix Zone	Action	Backbone Entertainment	Xbox 360	Yes	Yes	Yes	
2009	Cyber Troopers Virtual-On Oratorio Tangram	Action, Fighting	Sega	Xbox 360	Yes	Yes	Yes	
2009	Empire: Total War	Strategy	Creative Assembly	Microsoft Windows	Yes	Yes	Yes	
2009	Football Manager 2010	Sports, Simulation	Sports Interactive	Microsoft Windows		Yes	Yes	
2009	Football Manager Handheld 2010	Sports, Simulation	Sports Interactive	PlayStation Portable			Yes	
2009	Football Manager Live	Sports, Simulation	Sports Interactive	Microsoft Windows		Yes	Yes	
2009	Gunstar Heroes	Action	Backbone Entertainment	Xbox 360	Yes	Yes	Yes	
2009	Hatsune Miku: Project DIVA	Rhythm	Sega	PlayStation Portable	Yes			
2009	J.League Pro Soccer Club o Tsukurou! 6: Pride of J	Sports, Simulation	Sega	PlayStation Portable	Yes			
2009	Jambo! Safari: Animal Rescue	Driving	Full Fat	Wii		Yes	Yes	
2009	Jambo! Safari: Animal Rescue	Driving	Full Fat	Nintendo DS		Yes	Yes	
2009	MadWorld	Action	Platinum Games	Wii	Yes	Yes	Yes	
2009	Mario & Sonic at the Winter Olympic games	Sports	Sega	Wii	Yes	Yes	Yes	
2009	Mario & Sonic at the Winter Olympic games	Sports	Sega	Nintendo DS	Yes	Yes	Yes	
2009	Phantasy Star II	RPG	Backbone Entertainment	Xbox 360	Yes	Yes	Yes	
2009	Phantasy Star Portable 2	Action RPG	Sega, Alfasystem	Nintendo DS	Yes	Yes	Yes	
2009	Planet 51: The Game	Driving	Pyro Studios	Xbox 360		Yes	Yes	
2009	Planet 51: The Game	Driving	Pyro Studios	PlayStation 3		Yes	Yes	
2009	Planet 51: The Game	Driving	Pyro Studios	Wii		Yes	Yes	
2009	Planet 51: The Game	Driving	Pyro Studios	Nintendo DS		Yes	Yes	
2009	Puyo Puyo 7	Puzzle	Sega	Nintendo DS	Yes			
2009	Puyo Puyo 7	Puzzle	Sega	Wii	Yes			
2009	Puyo Puyo 7	Puzzle	Sega	PlayStation Portable	Yes			
2009	Sonic's Ultimate Genesis Collection	Compilation	Backbone Entertainment	Xbox 360		Yes	Yes	
2009	Sonic's Ultimate Genesis Collection	Compilation	Backbone Entertainment	PlayStation 3		Yes	Yes	
2009	Shining Force Feather	Strategy	Flight-Plan	Nintendo DS	Yes			
2009	Shining Wind Fan Fest	Non-game	Neverland	Microsoft Windows	Yes			
2009	Shinobi	Action	Backbone Entertainment	Xbox 360	Yes	Yes	Yes	
2009	Stormrise	Strategy	The Creative Assembly	Xbox 360		Yes	Yes	
2009	Stormrise	Strategy	The Creative Assembly	PlayStation 3		Yes	Yes	
2009	Stormrise	Strategy	The Creative Assembly	Microsoft Windows		Yes	Yes	
2009	Sonic & Knuckles	Platform	Backbone Entertainment	Xbox 360	Yes	Yes	Yes	
2009	Sonic and the Black Knight	Platform	Sega (Sonic Team)	Wii	Yes	Yes	Yes	
2009	Sonic the Hedgehog 3	Platform	Backbone Entertainment	Xbox 360	Yes	Yes	Yes	
2009	Suzumiya Haruhi no Chokuretsu	Adventure	cavia	Nintendo DS	Yes			
2009	Suzumiya Haruhi no Heiretsu	Adventure	cavia	Wii	Yes			
2009	The Conduit	FPS	High Voltage Software	Wii		Yes	Yes	
2009	The Hardy Boys: Treasure on the Tracks	Adventure	Her Interactive	Nintendo DS		Yes		
2009	The House of the Dead: Overkill	Rail shooter	Headstrong Games	Wii	Yes	Yes	Yes	
2009	OutRun Online Arcade	Driving	Sumo Digital	Xbox 360		Yes	Yes	
2009	OutRun Online Arcade	Driving	Sumo Digital	PlayStation 3			Yes	
2009	Virtua Tennis 2009	Sports	Sumo Digital	Xbox 360		Yes	Yes	
2009	Virtua Tennis 2009	Sports	Sumo Digital	PlayStation 3	Yes	Yes	Yes	
2009	Virtua Tennis 2009	Sports	Sumo Digital	Wii		Yes	Yes	
2009	Virtua Tennis 2009	Sports	Sumo Digital	Microsoft Windows		Yes	Yes	
2009	Yakuza 3	Action adventure	Sega	PlayStation 3	Yes	Yes	Yes	
2010	After Burner Climax	Shoot em' up	Sega (AM2)	PlayStation 3	Yes	Yes	Yes	
2010	After Burner Climax	Shoot em' up	Sega (AM2)	Xbox 360	Yes	Yes	Yes	
2010	Alpha Protocol	Action RPG	Obsidian Entertainment	Xbox 360		Yes	Yes	
2010	Alpha Protocol	Action RPG	Obsidian Entertainment	PlayStation 3		Yes	Yes	
2010	Alpha Protocol	Action RPG	Obsidian Entertainment	Microsoft Windows		Yes	Yes	
2010	Alien vs. Predator	FPS	Rebellion Developments	Xbox 360		Yes	Yes	
2010	Alien vs. Predator	FPS	Rebellion Developments	PlayStation 3		Yes	Yes	
2010	Alien vs. Predator	FPS	Rebellion Developments	Microsoft Windows		Yes	Yes	
2010	Crazy Taxi	Driving	Sega Shanghai Studio	Xbox 360	Yes	Yes	Yes	
2010	Crazy Taxi	Driving	Sega Shanghai Studio	PlayStation 3	Yes	Yes	Yes	
2010	Cyber Troopers Virtual-On Force	Action, Fighting	Sega	Xbox 360	Yes			
2010	Football Manager 2011	Sports, Simulation	Sports Interactive	Microsoft Windows		Yes	Yes	
2010	Football Manager Handheld 2011	Sports, Simulation	Sports Interactive	PlayStation Portable		Yes		
2010	Gunblade NY & LA Machineguns	Rail shooter	Sega	Wii		Yes	Yes	
2010	Hatsune Miku: Project DIVA 2nd	Rhythm	Sega	PlayStation Portable	Yes			
2010	Hatsune Miku: Project DIVA Dreamy Theater	Rhythm	Sega	PlayStation 3	Yes			
2010	Iron Man 2	Action	Sega Studio Francisco	Xbox 360		Yes	Yes	
2010	Iron Man 2	Action	Sega Studio Francisco	PlayStation 3		Yes	Yes	
2010	Iron Man 2	Action	High Voltage Software	PlayStation Portable		Yes	Yes	
2010	Iron Man 2	Action	High Voltage Software	Wii		Yes	Yes	
2010	Infinite Space	RPG	Nude Maker, Platinum Games	Nintendo DS	Yes	Yes	Yes	
2010	K-On! Houkago Live!!	Rhythm	Sega	PlayStation Portable	Yes			
2010	Kurohyou: Ryu ga Gotoku Shinshou	Action adventure	Sega, Syn Sophia	PlayStation Portable	Yes			
2010	Lilpri DS: Hime-Chen! Apple Pink	Adventure	Sega	Nintendo DS	Yes			
2010	Napoleon: Total War	Strategy	Creative Assembly	Microsoft Windows	Yes	Yes	Yes	
2010	Rekishi Taisen Gettenka: Tenkaichi Battle Royale	Fighting	Sega	Nintendo DS	Yes			
2010	Resonance of Fate	RPG	Tri-Ace	Xbox 360	Yes	Yes	Yes	
2010	Resonance of Fate	RPG	Tri-Ace	PlayStation 3	Yes	Yes	Yes	
2010	Sakatsuku DS: World Challenge 2010	Sports	Sega	Nintendo DS	Yes			
2010	Sega Genesis Classics Pack	Compilation	d3t	Microsoft Windows		Yes	Yes	
2010	Sega Genesis Classics Pack 2	Compilation	d3t	Microsoft Windows		Yes	Yes	
2010	Sega Genesis Classics Pack 3	Compilation	d3t	Microsoft Windows		Yes	Yes	
2010	Shining Heart	RPG	Sega, Studio Saizensen	PlayStation Portable	Yes			
2010	Sonic & Sega All-Stars Racing	Racing	Sumo Digital	Xbox 360		Yes	Yes	
2010	Sonic & Sega All-Stars Racing	Racing	Sumo Digital	PlayStation 3		Yes	Yes	
2010	Sonic & Sega All-Stars Racing	Racing	Sumo Digital	Wii		Yes	Yes	
2010	Sonic & Sega All-Stars Racing	Racing	Sumo Digital	Nintendo DS		Yes	Yes	
2010	Sonic & Sega All-Stars Racing	Racing	Sumo Digital	Microsoft Windows		Yes	Yes	
2010	Sonic Classic Collection	Compilation	Sega Studio Australia	Nintendo DS		Yes	Yes	
2010	Sonic Colors	Platform	Sega (Sonic Team)	Wii	Yes	Yes	Yes	
2010	Sonic Colors	Platform	Sega (Sonic Team), Dimps	Nintendo DS	Yes	Yes	Yes	
2010	Sonic Free Riders	Racing	Sega (Sonic Team)	Xbox 360	Yes	Yes	Yes	
2010	Sonic the Hedgehog 4: Episode I	Platforms	Sega (Sonic Team), Dimps	Xbox 360	Yes	Yes	Yes	
2010	Sonic the Hedgehog 4: Episode I	Platforms	Sega (Sonic Team), Dimps	PlayStation 3	Yes	Yes	Yes	
2010	Sonic the Hedgehog 4: Episode I	Platforms	Sega (Sonic Team), Dimps	Microsoft Windows	Yes	Yes	Yes	
2010	Sonic Adventure	Platform	Sega Shanghai Studio	Xbox 360	Yes	Yes	Yes	
2010	Sonic Adventure	Platform	Sega Shanghai Studio	PlayStation 3	Yes	Yes	Yes	
2010	Super Monkey Ball: Step & Roll	Platform, Puzzle	Sega	Wii	Yes	Yes	Yes	
2010	Tournament of Legends	Fighting	High Voltage Software	Wii		Yes	Yes	
2010	Vancouver 2010	Sports	Eurocom	Xbox 360		Yes	Yes	
2010	Vancouver 2010	Sports	Eurocom	PlayStation 3		Yes	Yes	
2010	Vancouver 2010	Sports	Eurocom	Microsoft Windows		Yes	Yes	
2010	Vanquish	TPS	Platinum Games	Xbox 360	Yes	Yes	Yes	
2010	Vanquish	TPS	Platinum Games	PlayStation 3	Yes	Yes	Yes	
2010	Valkyria Chronicles II	Strategy	Sega	PlayStation Portable	Yes	Yes	Yes	
2010	Wacky World of Sports	Sports	Tabot	Wii	Yes	Yes	Yes	
2010	Yakuza 4	Action Adventure	Sega	PlayStation 3	Yes	Yes	Yes	
2011	7th Dragon 2020	RPG	imageepoch	PlayStation Portable	Yes			
2011	Aliens: Infestation	Action	WayForward	Nintendo DS		Yes	Yes	
2011	Altered Beast	Action	Backbone Entertainment	PlayStation 3	Yes	Yes	Yes	
2011	Captain America: Super Soldier	Action	Next Level Games	Xbox 360		Yes	Yes	
2011	Captain America: Super Soldier	Action	Next Level Games	PlayStation 3		Yes	Yes	
2011	Captain America: Super Soldier	Action	Griptonite Games	Nintendo DS		Yes	Yes	
2011	Captain America: Super Soldier	Action	High Voltage Software	Wii		Yes	Yes	
2011	Captain America: Super Soldier	Action	High Voltage Software	Nintendo 3DS		Yes	Yes	
2011	Comix Zone	Action	Backbone Entertainment	PlayStation 3	Yes	Yes	Yes	
2011	Conduit 2	FPS	High Software Voltage	Wii		Yes	Yes	
2011	Daytona USA	Racing	Sega (AM2)	Xbox 360	Yes	Yes	Yes	
2011	Daytona USA	Racing	Sega (AM2)	PlayStation 3	Yes	Yes	Yes	
2011	Dreamcast Collection	Compilation	Sega Shanghai Studio	Xbox 360		Yes	Yes	
2011	Football Manager Handheld 2012	Sports, Simulation	Sports Interactive	Microsoft Windows	Yes	Yes	Yes	
2011	Golden Axe	Action	Backbone Entertainment	PlayStation 3	Yes	Yes	Yes	
2011	Guardian Heroes	Action	Treasure	Xbox 360	Yes	Yes	Yes	
2011	Hatsune Miku: Project DIVA Dreamy Theater 2nd	Rhythm	Sega	PlayStation 3	Yes			
2011	Hatsune Miku: Project DIVA Extend	Rhythm	Sega	PlayStation Portable	Yes			
2011	J.League Pro Soccer Club o Tsukurou! 7: Euro Plus	Sports, Simulation	Sega	PlayStation Portable	Yes			
2011	Mario & Sonic at the London 2012 Olympic Games	Sports	Sega	Wii	Yes	Yes	Yes	
2011	MLB Manager Online	Sports, Simulation	Sega	Microsoft Windows		Yes		
2011	Phantasy Star Portable 2 Infinity	Action RPG	Sega, Alfasystem	PlayStation Portable	Yes			
2011	Puyo Puyo!! 20th Anniversary	Puzzle	Sega	Nintendo DS	Yes			
2011	Puyo Puyo!! 20th Anniversary	Puzzle	Sega	PlayStation Portable	Yes			
2011	Puyo Puyo!! 20th Anniversary	Puzzle	Sega	Wii	Yes			
2011	Puyo Puyo!! 20th Anniversary	Puzzle	Sega	Nintendo 3DS	Yes			
2011	Renegade Ops	Action	Avalanche Studios	Xbox 360	Yes	Yes	Yes	
2011	Renegade Ops	Action	Avalanche Studios	PlayStation 3	Yes	Yes	Yes	
2011	Renegade Ops	Action	Avalanche Studios	Microsoft Windows		Yes	Yes	
2011	Rise of Nightmares	Action	Sega	Xbox 360	Yes	Yes	Yes	
2011	Sega Bass Fishing	Simulation	Sega Shanghai Studio	Xbox 360	Yes	Yes	Yes	
2011	Sega Bass Fishing	Simulation	Sega Shanghai Studio	PlayStation 3	Yes	Yes	Yes	
2011	Sega Genesis Classics Pack 4	Compilation	d3t	Microsoft Windows		Yes	Yes	
2011	Sega Rally Online Arcade	Racing	Sumo Digital	Xbox 360		Yes	Yes	
2011	Sega Rally Online Arcade	Racing	Sumo Digital	PlayStation 3		Yes	Yes	
2011	Shinobi 3D	Action	Griptonite Games	Nintendo 3DS	Yes	Yes	Yes	
2011	Space Channel 5 Part 2	Rhythm	Sega Shanghai Studio	Xbox 360	Yes	Yes	Yes	
2011	Space Channel 5 Part 2	Rhythm	Sega Shanghai Studio	PlayStation 3	Yes	Yes	Yes	
2011	Spiral Knights	MMO, RPG	Three Rings Design	Microsoft Windows		Yes	Yes	
2011	Streets of Rage 2	Action	Backbone Entertainment	Xbox 360	Yes	Yes	Yes	
2011	Sonic CD	Platform	Christian Whitehead, Blit Software	Xbox 360	Yes	Yes	Yes	
2011	Sonic CD	Platform	Christian Whitehead, Blit Software	PlayStation 3	Yes	Yes	Yes	
2011	Sonic Generations	Platform	Sega (Sonic Team)	Xbox 360	Yes	Yes	Yes	
2011	Sonic Generations	Platform	Sega (Sonic Team)	PlayStation 3	Yes	Yes	Yes	
2011	Sonic Generations	Platform	Sega (Sonic Team)	Microsoft Windows	Yes	Yes	Yes	
2011	Sonic Generations	Platform	Sega (Sonic Team), Dimps	Nintendo 3DS	Yes	Yes	Yes	
2011	Sonic the Hedgehog	Platform	Backbone Entertainment	PlayStation 3	Yes	Yes	Yes	
2011	Sonic the Hedgehog 2	Platform	Backbone Entertainment	PlayStation 3	Yes	Yes	Yes	
2011	Super Monkey Ball 3D	Platform, Puzzle	Sega	Nintendo 3DS	Yes	Yes	Yes	
2011	The House of the Dead: Overkill - Extended Cut	Rail shooter	Headstrong Games	PlayStation 3	Yes	Yes	Yes	
2011	Thor: God of Thunder	Action	Liquid Entertainment	Xbox 360		Yes	Yes	
2011	Thor: God of Thunder	Action	Liquid Entertainment	PlayStation 3		Yes	Yes	
2011	Thor: God of Thunder	Action	Red Fly Studios	Wii		Yes	Yes	
2011	Thor: God of Thunder	Action	Red Fly Studios	Nintendo 3DS		Yes	Yes	
2011	Thor: God of Thunder	Action	WayForward	Nintendo DS		Yes	Yes	
2011	Total War: Shogun II	Strategy	Creative Assembly	Microsoft Windows		Yes	Yes	
2011	Valkyria Chronicles III	Strategy	Sega, Media.Vision	PlayStation Portable	Yes			
2011	Virtua Tennis 4	Sports	Sega	Xbox 360	Yes	Yes	Yes	
2011	Virtua Tennis 4	Sports	Sega	PlayStation 3	Yes	Yes	Yes	
2011	Virtua Tennis 4	Sports	Sega	Wii	Yes	Yes	Yes	
2011	Virtua Tennis 4	Sports	Sega	PlayStation Vita	Yes	Yes	Yes	
2011	Virtua Tennis 4	Sports	Sega	Microsoft Windows	Yes	Yes	Yes	
2011	Yakuza: Dead Souls	Action adventure	Sega	PlayStation 3	Yes	Yes	Yes	
2012	3D Space Harrier	Shoot em' up	M2	Nintendo 3DS	Yes	Yes	Yes	
2012	Anarchy Reigns	Action, Fighting	Platinum Games	Xbox 360	Yes	Yes	Yes	
2012	Anarchy Reigns	Action, Fighting	Platinum Games	PlayStation 3	Yes	Yes	Yes	
2012	Binary Domain	TPS	Sega (Ryu Ga Gotoku Studio)	Xbox 360	Yes	Yes	Yes	
2012	Binary Domain	TPS	Sega (Ryu Ga Gotoku Studio)	PlayStation 3	Yes	Yes	Yes	
2012	Binary Domain	TPS	Sega (Ryu Ga Gotoku Studio)	Microsoft Windows		Yes	Yes	
2012	Crush 3D	Puzzle	Zoe Mode	Nintendo 3DS	Yes	Yes	Yes	
2012	Fighting Vipers	Fighting	Sega (AM2)	Xbox 360	Yes	Yes	Yes	
2012	Fighting Vipers	Fighting	Sega (AM2)	PlayStation 3	Yes	Yes	Yes	
2012	Football Manager 2013	Sports, Simulation	Sports Interactive	Microsoft Windows		Yes	Yes	
2012	Hatsune Miku and Future Stars Project Mirai	Rhythm	Sega	Nintendo 3DS	Yes			
2012	Hatsune Miku: Project Diva - Dreamy Theater Extend	Rhythm	Sega	PlayStation 3	Yes			
2012	Hatsune Miku: Project DIVA f	Rhythm	Sega	PlayStation Vita	Yes	Yes	Yes	
2012	Hell Yeah! Wrath of the Dead Rabbit	Platform	Arkedo Studio	Xbox 360	Yes	Yes	Yes	
2012	Hell Yeah! Wrath of the Dead Rabbit	Platform	Arkedo Studio	PlayStation 3	Yes	Yes	Yes	
2012	Hell Yeah! Wrath of the Dead Rabbit	Platform	Arkedo Studio	Microsoft Windows		Yes	Yes	
2012	Jet Set Radio	Platform	Blit Software	Xbox 360	Yes	Yes	Yes	
2012	Jet Set Radio	Platform	Blit Software	PlayStation 3	Yes	Yes	Yes	
2012	Jet Set Radio	Platform	Blit Software	PlayStation Vita	Yes	Yes	Yes	
2012	Jet Set Radio	Platform	Blit Software	Microsoft Windows		Yes	Yes	
2012	Jissen Pachi-Slot Hisshouhou! Hokuto no Ken F - Seikimatsu Kyuuseishu Densetsu	Gambling, Simulation	Sammy	PlayStation 3	Yes			
2012	K-On! Houkago Live!! HD Ver.	Rhythm	Sega	PlayStation 3	Yes			
2012	Kurohyou 2: Ryu ga Gotoku Ashura Hen	Action Adventure	Sega (Ryu Ga Gotoku Studio), Syn Sophia	PlayStation Portable	Yes			
2012	London 2012	Sports	Sega Studio Australia	Xbox 360		Yes	Yes	
2012	London 2012	Sports	Sega Studio Australia	PlayStation 3		Yes	Yes	
2012	London 2012	Sports	Sega Studio Australia	Microsoft Windows		Yes	Yes	
2012	Mario & Sonic at the London 2012 Olympic Games	Sports	Sega	Nintendo 3DS	Yes	Yes	Yes	
2012	NiGHTS Into Dreams...	Action	Sega Shanghai Studio	Xbox 360	Yes	Yes	Yes	
2012	NiGHTS Into Dreams...	Action	Sega Shanghai Studio	PlayStation 3	Yes	Yes	Yes	
2012	NiGHTS Into Dreams...	Action	Sega Shanghai Studio	Microsoft Windows		Yes	Yes	
2012	Phantasy Star Online 2	Action RPG, MMO	Sega	Microsoft Windows	Yes	Yes	Yes	
2012	Ryu Ga Gotoku 1&2 HD Collection	Action adventure	Sega (Ryu Ga Gotoku Studio)	PlayStation 3	Yes			
2012	Rhythm Thief & the Emperor's Treasure	Rhythm	Sega, xeen	Nintendo 3DS	Yes	Yes	Yes	
2012	Sega Vintage Collection: Alex Kidd & Co.	Compilation	M2	Xbox 360	Yes	Yes	Yes	
2012	Sega Vintage Collection: Golden Axe	Action	M2	Xbox 360	Yes	Yes	Yes	
2012	Sega Vintage Collection: Monster World	Compilation	M2	Xbox 360	Yes	Yes	Yes	
2012	Sega Vintage Collection: Streets of Rage	Action	M2	Xbox 360	Yes	Yes	Yes	
2012	Sega Vintage Collection: ToeJam & Earl	Action	M2	Xbox 360	Yes	Yes	Yes	
2012	Shining Blade	Strategy	Sega, Media.Vision	PlayStation Portable	Yes			
2012	Samurai & Dragons	CCG, Action RPG, Simulation	Sega	PlayStation Vita	Yes			
2012	Sonic & All-Stars Racing Transformed	Racing	Sumo Digital	Xbox 360		Yes	Yes	
2012	Sonic & All-Stars Racing Transformed	Racing	Sumo Digital	PlayStation 3	Yes	Yes	Yes	
2012	Sonic & All-Stars Racing Transformed	Racing	Sumo Digital	Nintendo 3DS		Yes	Yes	
2012	Sonic & All-Stars Racing Transformed	Racing	Sumo Digital	PlayStation Vita		Yes	Yes	
2012	Sonic & All-Stars Racing Transformed	Racing	Sumo Digital	Wii U	Yes	Yes	Yes	
2012	Sonic & All-Stars Racing Transformed	Racing	Sumo Digital	Microsoft Windows		Yes	Yes	
2012	Sonic Adventure 2	Platform	Sega Shanghai Studio	Xbox 360	Yes	Yes	Yes	
2012	Sonic Adventure 2	Platform	Sega Shanghai Studio	PlayStation 3	Yes	Yes	Yes	
2012	Sonic Adventure 2	Platform	Sega Shanghai Studio	Microsoft Windows		Yes	Yes	
2012	Sonic the Fighters	Fighting	Sega (AM2)	Xbox 360	Yes	Yes	Yes	
2012	Sonic the Fighters	Fighting	Sega (AM2)	PlayStation 3	Yes	Yes	Yes	
2012	Sonic the Hedgehog 4: Episode I	Platformer	Sega (Sonic Team), Dimps	Microsoft Windows		Yes	Yes	
2012	Sonic the Hedgehog 4: Episode II	Platformer	Sega (Sonic Team), Dimps	Xbox 360	Yes	Yes	Yes	
2012	Sonic the Hedgehog 4: Episode II	Platformer	Sega (Sonic Team), Dimps	PlayStation 3	Yes	Yes	Yes	
2012	Sonic the Hedgehog 4: Episode II	Platformer	Sega (Sonic Team), Dimps	Microsoft Windows		Yes	Yes	
2012	Super Monkey Ball: Banana Splitz	Platform, Puzzle	Sega, Marvelous Inc	PlayStation Vita	Yes	Yes	Yes	
2012	The House of the Dead 4	Rail shooter	Sega Shanghai Studio	PlayStation 3	Yes	Yes	Yes	
2012	The House of the Dead III	Rail shooter	Sega Shanghai Studio	PlayStation 3	Yes	Yes	Yes	
2012	Total War Battles: Shogun	Strategy	Creative Assembly	Microsoft Windows		Yes	Yes	
2012	Viking: Battle for Asgard	Action adventure	Creative Assembly	Microsoft Windows		Yes	Yes	
2012	Virtua Fighter 2	Fighting	Sega (AM2)	Xbox 360	Yes	Yes	Yes	
2012	Virtua Fighter 2	Fighting	Sega (AM2)	PlayStation 3	Yes	Yes	Yes	
2012	Virtua Fighter 5: Final Showdown	Fighting	Sega (AM2)	Xbox 360	Yes	Yes	Yes	
2012	Virtua Fighter 5: Final Showdown	Fighting	Sega (AM2)	PlayStation 3	Yes	Yes	Yes	
2012	Yakuza 5	Action adventure	Sega (Ryu Ga Gotoku Studio)	PlayStation 3	Yes	Yes	Yes	
2013	3D After Burner II	Shoot em' up	M2	Nintendo 3DS	Yes	Yes	Yes	
2013	3D Altered Beast	Action	M2	Nintendo 3DS	Yes	Yes	Yes	
2013	3D Ecco the Dolphin	Action	M2	Nintendo 3DS	Yes	Yes	Yes	
2013	3D Galaxy Force II	Shoot em' up	M2	Nintendo 3DS	Yes	Yes	Yes	
2013	3D Shinobi III	Action	M2	Nintendo 3DS	Yes	Yes	Yes	
2013	3D Streets of Rage	Action	M2	Nintendo 3DS	Yes	Yes	Yes	
2013	3D Sonic the Hedgehog	Platform	M2	Nintendo 3DS	Yes	Yes	Yes	
2013	3D Super Hang-On	Driving	M2	Nintendo 3DS	Yes	Yes	Yes	
2013	7th Dragon 2020 - II	RPG	imageepoch	PlayStation Portable	Yes			
2013	Aliens: Colonial Marines	FPS	Gearbox Software	Xbox 360		Yes	Yes	
2013	Aliens: Colonial Marines	FPS	Gearbox Software	PlayStation 3		Yes	Yes	
2013	Aliens: Colonial Marines	FPS	Gearbox Software	Microsoft Windows		Yes	Yes	
2013	Castle of Illusion Starring Mickey Mouse	Platform	Sega Studio Australia	Xbox 360	Yes	Yes	Yes	
2013	Castle of Illusion Starring Mickey Mouse	Platform	Sega Studio Australia	PlayStation 3	Yes	Yes	Yes	
2013	Castle of Illusion Starring Mickey Mouse	Platform	Sega Studio Australia	Microsoft Windows		Yes	Yes	
2013	Company of Heroes 2	Strategy	Relic Entertainment	Microsoft Windows		Yes	Yes	
2013	Cyber Troopers Virtual-On: Operation Moongate	Action, Fighting	Sega	Xbox 360	Yes			
2013	Cyber Troopers Virtual-On: Operation Moongate	Action, Fighting	Sega	PlayStation 3	Yes			
2013	Football Manager 2014	Sports, Simulation	Sports Interactive	Microsoft Windows		Yes	Yes	
2013	J.League Pro Soccer Club o Tsukurou! 8 Euro Plus	Sports, Simulation	Sega	PlayStation Portable	Yes			
2013	Godsrule: War of Mortals	Simulation	Gogogic	Microsoft Windows		Yes	Yes	
2013	Hatsune Miku: Project DIVA F	Rhythm	Sega	PlayStation 3	Yes	Yes	Yes	
2013	Hatsune Miku: Project Mirai 2	Rhythm	Sega	Nintendo 3DS	Yes			
2013	Mario & Sonic at the Sochi 2014 Olympic Winter Games	Sports	Sega	Wii U	Yes	Yes	Yes	
2013	Phantasy Star Online 2	Action RPG, MMO	Sega	PlayStation Vita	Yes			
2013	Ryu Ga Gotoku 1&2 HD Collection	Action adventure	Sega (Ryu Ga Gotoku Studio)	PlayStation 3	Yes			
2013	SegaNet Mahjong MJ	Table	Sega	Microsoft Windows	Yes			
2013	Sega Vintage Collection: Alex Kidd & Co.	Compilation	M2	PlayStation 3	Yes	Yes	Yes	
2013	Sega Vintage Collection: Monster World	Compilation	M2	PlayStation 3	Yes	Yes	Yes	
2013	Sega Vintage Collection: ToeJam & Earl	Compilation	M2	PlayStation 3	Yes	Yes	Yes	
2013	Shining Ark	RPG	Sega, Media.Vision	PlayStation Portable	Yes			
2013	Soccer Tsuku: Pro Soccer Club o Tsukurou!	Sports	Sega	PlayStation 3	Yes			
2013	Soccer Tsuku: Pro Soccer Club o Tsukurou!	Sports	Sega	PlayStation Vita	Yes			
2013	Sonic Lost World	Platform	Sega (Sonic Team)	Wii U	Yes	Yes	Yes	
2013	Sonic Lost World	Platform	Sega (Sonic Team), Dimps	Nintendo 3DS	Yes	Yes	Yes	
2013	The Cave	Adventure	Double Fine Productions	Xbox 360		Yes	Yes	
2013	The Cave	Adventure	Double Fine Productions	PlayStation 3	Yes	Yes	Yes	
2013	The Cave	Adventure	Double Fine Productions	Wii U	Yes	Yes	Yes	
2013	The Cave	Adventure	Double Fine Productions	Microsoft Windows		Yes	Yes	
2013	The Typing of the Dead: Overkill	Educational, Rail shooter	Modern Dreams	Microsoft Windows		Yes	Yes	
2013	Total War: Rome II	Strategy	Creative Assembly	Microsoft Windows		Yes	Yes	
2013	Virtua Striker	Sports	Sega (AM2)	Xbox 360	Yes			
2013	Virtua Striker	Sports	Sega (AM2)	PlayStation 3	Yes			
2014	3D Fantasy Zone: Opa-Opa Bros.	Shoot em' up	M2	Nintendo 3DS	Yes	Yes	Yes	
2014	3D Fantasy Zone II W	Shoot em' up	M2	Nintendo 3DS	Yes	Yes	Yes	
2014	3D Thunder Blade	Shoot em' up	M2	Nintendo 3DS	Yes	Yes	Yes	
2014	3D OutRun	Driving	M2	Nintendo 3DS	Yes	Yes	Yes	
2014	Alien: Isolation	FPS	Creative Assembly	Xbox 360		Yes	Yes	
2014	Alien: Isolation	FPS	Creative Assembly	PlayStation 3		Yes	Yes	
2014	Alien: Isolation	FPS	Creative Assembly	PlayStation 4	Yes	Yes	Yes	
2014	Alien: Isolation	FPS	Creative Assembly	Xbox One	Yes	Yes	Yes	
2014	Alien: Isolation	FPS	Creative Assembly	Microsoft Windows		Yes	Yes	
2014	Chain Chronicle V	CCG, RPG	Sega	PlayStation Vita	Yes			
2014	Dengeki Bunko Fighting Climax	Ecole Software	Fighting	PlayStation 3	Yes	Yes	Yes	
2014	Dengeki Bunko Fighting Climax	Ecole Software	Fighting	PlayStation Vita	Yes	Yes	Yes	
2014	Football Manager 2015	Sports Interactive	Sports, Simulation	Microsoft Windows		Yes	Yes	
2014	Ryū ga Gotoku Ishin!	Action adventure	Sega (Ryu Ga Gotoku Studio)	PlayStation 3	Yes			
2014	Ryū ga Gotoku Ishin!	Action adventure	Sega (Ryu Ga Gotoku Studio)	PlayStation 4	Yes			
2014	Ryu Ga Gotoku Ishin!: Free to Play Application	Action adventure	Sega (Ryu Ga Gotoku Studio)	PlayStation Vita	Yes			
2014	Hatsune Miku: Project DIVA F 2nd	Rhythm	Sega	PlayStation 3	Yes	Yes	Yes	
2014	Hatsune Miku: Project DIVA f 2nd	Rhythm	Sega	PlayStation Vita	Yes	Yes	Yes	
2014	Hero Bank	RPG	Sega, Digital Works Entertainment	Nintendo 3DS	Yes			
2014	Hero Bank 2	RPG	Sega, Digital Works Entertainment	Nintendo 3DS	Yes			
2014	Initial D Perfect Shift Online	Driving	Sega, iNiS Corporation	Nintendo 3DS	Yes			
2014	Phantasy Star Nova	Action RPG	Sega, Tri-Ace	PlayStation Vita	Yes			
2014	Puyo Puyo Tetris	Puzzle	Sega	PlayStation 3	Yes			
2014	Puyo Puyo Tetris	Puzzle	Sega	Nintendo 3DS	Yes			
2014	Puyo Puyo Tetris	Puzzle	Sega	PlayStation Vita	Yes			
2014	Puyo Puyo Tetris	Puzzle	Sega	Wii U	Yes			
2014	Puyo Puyo Tetris	Puzzle	Sega	PlayStation 4	Yes	Yes	Yes	
2014	Sega 3D Fukkoku Archives	Compilation	M2	Nintendo 3DS	Yes			
2014	Shining Resonance	Action RPG	Sega, Media.Vision	PlayStation 3	Yes			
2014	Sonic Boom: Rise of Lyric	Platform	Big Red Button	Wii U	Yes	Yes	Yes	
2014	Sonic Boom: Shattered Crystal	Platform	Sanzaru Games	Nintendo 3DS	Yes	Yes	Yes	
2014	Uta Kumi 575	Rhythm	Sega	PlayStation Vita	Yes			
2014	Valkyria Chronicles	Strategy	Little Heart Stone	Microsoft Windows		Yes	Yes	
2015	3D Gunstar Heroes	Action	M2	Nintendo 3DS	Yes	Yes	Yes	
2015	3D Streets of Rage 2	Action	M2	Nintendo 3DS	Yes	Yes	Yes	
2015	3D Sonic the Hedgehog 2	Platform	M2	Nintendo 3DS	Yes	Yes	Yes	
2015	7th Dragon III Code: VFD	RPG	Sega	Nintendo 3DS	Yes	Yes	Yes	
2015	Blade Arcus from Shining EX	Fighting	Studio Saizensen	PlayStation 3	Yes			
2015	Blade Arcus from Shining EX	Fighting	Studio Saizensen	PlayStation 4	Yes			
2015	Dengeki Bunko Fighting Climax Ignition	Fighting	French Bread	PlayStation 3	Yes			
2015	Dengeki Bunko Fighting Climax Ignition	Fighting	French Bread	PlayStation 4	Yes			
2015	Eastside Hockey Manager	Sports, Simulation	Sports Interactive	Microsoft Windows		Yes	Yes	
2015	Football Manager 2016	Sports, Simulation	Sports Interactive	Microsoft Windows		Yes	Yes	
2015	Hatsune Miku: Project Mirai DX	Rhythm	Sega	Nintendo 3DS	Yes	Yes	Yes	
2015	Miracle Girl Festival	Rhythm	Sega	PlayStation Vita	Yes			
2015	Ryu Ga Gotoku 0: Free to Play Application	Action adventure	Sega (Ryu Ga Gotoku Studio)	PlayStation Vita	Yes			
2015	Sega 3D Classics Collection	Compilation	M2	Nintendo 3DS	Yes	Yes	Yes	
2015	Stella Glow	RPG	imageepoch	Nintendo 3DS	Yes	Yes	Yes	
2015	Sonic Lost World	Platform	Sega Europe	Microsoft Windows		Yes	Yes	
2015	Tembo the Badass Elephant	Platform	Game Freak	PlayStation 4		Yes	Yes	
2015	Tembo the Badass Elephant	Platform	Game Freak	Xbox One		Yes	Yes	
2015	Tembo the Badass Elephant	Platform	Game Freak	Microsoft Windows		Yes	Yes	
2015	The World of the End Eclipse	RPG	Sega	Microsoft Windows	Yes			
2015	Total War: Arena	Strategy	Creative Assembly	Microsoft Windows		Yes	Yes	
2015	Total War: Attila	Strategy	Creative Assembly	Microsoft Windows		Yes	Yes	
2015	Yakuza 0	Platform	Sega (Ryu Ga Gotoku Studio)	PlayStation 3	Yes			
2015	Yakuza 0	Platform	Sega (Ryu Ga Gotoku Studio)	PlayStation 4	Yes	Yes	Yes	
2016	Football Manager 2017	Sports, Simulation	Sports Interactive	Microsoft Windows		Yes	Yes	
2016	Hatsune Miku: Project DIVA Future Tone	Rhythm	Sega	PlayStation 4	Yes	Yes	Yes	
2016	Hatsune Miku: Project DIVA X	Rhythm	Sega	PlayStation 4	Yes	Yes	Yes	
2016	Hatsune Miku: Project DIVA X	Rhythm	Sega	PlayStation Vita	Yes	Yes	Yes	
2016	Hatsune Miku VR: Future Live	Rhythm	Sega	PlayStation 4	Yes	Yes	Yes	
2016	Mario & Sonic at the Rio 2016 Olympic Games	Sports	Sega	Wii U	Yes	Yes	Yes	
2016	Mario & Sonic at the Rio 2016 Olympic Games	Sports	Sega	Nintendo 3DS	Yes	Yes	Yes	
2016	Motorsports Manager	Simulation	PlaySports Manager	Microsoft Windows		Yes	Yes	
2016	Phantasy Star Online 2	Action RPG, MMO	Sega	PlayStation 4	Yes			
2016	Puyo Puyo Chronicle	Puzzle, RPG	Sega	Nintendo 3DS	Yes			
2016	Sega 3D Fukkoku Archives 3: Final Stage	Compilation	M2	Nintendo 3DS	Yes			
2016	Sonic Boom: Fire & Ice	Platform	Sanzaru Games	Nintendo 3DS	Yes	Yes	Yes	
2016	Total War Battles: Kingdom	Strategy	Creative Assembly	Microsoft Windows		Yes	Yes	
2016	Total War: Warhammer	Strategy	Creative Assembly	Microsoft Windows		Yes	Yes	
2016	Valkyria Chronicles: Remastered	Strategy	Sega, Media.Vision	PlayStation 4	Yes	Yes	Yes	
2016	Yakuza Kiwami	Action adventure	Sega (Ryu Ga Gotoku Studio)	PlayStation 3	Yes			
2016	Yakuza Kiwami	Action adventure	Sega (Ryu Ga Gotoku Studio)	PlayStation 4	Yes	Yes	Yes	
2016	Yakuza 6: The Song of Life	Action adventure	Sega (Ryu Ga Gotoku Studio)	PlayStation 4	Yes	Yes	Yes	
2016	Yakyuu Tsuku!!	Sports, Simulation	Sega	Microsoft Windows	Yes			
2017	8-Bit Bayonetta	Action	Little Heart Stone	Microsoft Windows		Yes	Yes	
2017	Bayonetta	Action	Little Heart Stone	Microsoft Windows		Yes	Yes	
2017	Endless Space 2	Strategy	Amplitude Studios	Microsoft Windows		Yes	Yes	
2017	Football Manager 2018	Sports, Simulation	Sports Interactive	Microsoft Windows		Yes	Yes	
2017	Hatsune Miku: Project DIVA Future Tone DX	Rhythm	Sega	PlayStation 4	Yes			
2017	Puyo Puyo Tetris	Puzzle	Sega (Sonic Team)	Nintendo Switch	Yes	Yes	Yes	
2017	Sonic Forces	Platform	Sega (Sonic Team)	PlayStation 4	Yes	Yes	Yes	
2017	Sonic Forces	Platform	Sega (Sonic Team)	Xbox One	Yes	Yes	Yes	
2017	Sonic Forces	Platform	Sega (Sonic Team)	Nintendo Switch	Yes	Yes	Yes	
2017	Sonic Forces	Platform	Sega (Sonic Team)	Microsoft Windows	Yes	Yes	Yes	
2017	Sonic Mania	Platform	Christian Whitehead, Headcannon, PagodaWest Games	PlayStation 4	Yes	Yes	Yes	
2017	Sonic Mania	Platform	Christian Whitehead, Headcannon, PagodaWest Games	Xbox One	Yes	Yes	Yes	
2017	Sonic Mania	Platform	Christian Whitehead, Headcannon, PagodaWest Games	Nintendo Switch	Yes	Yes	Yes	
2017	Sonic Mania	Platform	Christian Whitehead, Headcannon, PagodaWest Games	Microsoft Windows		Yes	Yes	
2017	Total War: Warhammer II	Strategy	Creative Assembly	Microsoft Windows		Yes	Yes	
2017	Warhammer 40,000: Dawn of War III	Strategy	Relic Entertainment	Microsoft Windows		Yes	Yes	
2017	Valkyria Revolution	Action RPG	Sega, Media.Vision	PlayStation Vita	Yes	Yes	Yes	
2017	Valkyria Revolution	Action RPG	Sega, Media.Vision	PlayStation 4	Yes	Yes	Yes	
2017	Valkyria Revolution	Action RPG	Sega, Media.Vision	Xbox One		Yes	Yes	
2017	Vanquish	TPS	Little Heart Stone	Microsoft Windows		Yes	Yes	
2017	Yakuza Kiwami 2	Action adventure	Sega (Ryu Ga Gotoku Studio)	PlayStation 4	Yes	Yes	Yes	
2018	Border Break	TPS	Sega (AM2)	PlayStation 4	Yes			
2018	Fist of the North Star: Lost Paradise	Action adventure	Sega (Ryu Ga Gotoku Studio)	PlayStation 4	Yes	Yes	Yes	
2018	Football Manager 2019	Sports, Simulation	Sports Interactive	Microsoft Windows		Yes	Yes	
2018	Football Manager Touch 2018	Sports, Simulation	Sports Interactive	Nintendo Switch		Yes	Yes	
2018	Judgment	Action adventure	Sega (Ryu Ga Gotoku Studio)	PlayStation 4	Yes	Yes	Yes	
2018	Phantasy Star Online 2	Action RPG, MMO	Sega	Nintendo Switch	Yes			
2018	Puyo Puyo Champions	Puzzle	Sega	PlayStation 4	Yes	Yes	Yes	
2018	Puyo Puyo Champions	Puzzle	Sega	Nintendo Switch	Yes	Yes	Yes	
2018	Ryu Ga Gotoku Online	CCG, RPG	Sega (Ryu Ga Gotoku Studio)	Microsoft Windows	Yes			
2018	Sega Ages:Gain Ground	Shoot em' up	M2	Nintendo Switch	Yes	Yes	Yes	
2018	Sega Ages:Out Run	Racing	M2	Nintendo Switch	Yes	Yes	Yes	
2018	Sega Ages:Phantasy Star	RPG	M2	Nintendo Switch	Yes	Yes	Yes	
2018	Sega Ages:Sonic the Hedgehog	Platform	M2	Nintendo Switch	Yes	Yes	Yes	
2018	Sega Ages:Thunderforce IV	Shoot em' up	M2	Nintendo Switch	Yes	Yes	Yes	
2018	Sega Genesis Classics	Compilation	d3t	PlayStation 4		Yes	Yes	
2018	Sega Genesis Classics	Compilation	d3t	Xbox One		Yes	Yes	
2018	Sega Genesis Classics	Compilation	d3t	Nintendo Switch		Yes	Yes	
2018	Shenmue I&II	Action adventure	d3t	PlayStation 4	Yes	Yes	Yes	
2018	Shenmue I&II	Action adventure	d3t	Xbox One		Yes	Yes	
2018	Shenmue I&II	Action adventure	d3t	Microsoft Windows		Yes	Yes	
2018	Shining Resonance Refrain	Action RPG	Sega, Media.Vision	PlayStation 4	Yes	Yes	Yes	
2018	Shining Resonance Refrain	Action RPG	Sega, Media.Vision	Xbox One		Yes	Yes	
2018	Shining Resonance Refrain	Action RPG	Sega, Media.Vision	Nintendo Switch	Yes	Yes	Yes	
2018	Shining Resonance Refrain	Action RPG	Sega, Media.Vision	Microsoft Windows		Yes	Yes	
2018	Sonic Mania Plus	Platformer	Christian Whitehead, Headcannon, PagodaWest Games	PlayStation 4	Yes	Yes	Yes	
2018	Sonic Mania Plus	Platformer	Christian Whitehead, Headcannon, PagodaWest Games	Xbox One		Yes	Yes	
2018	Sonic Mania Plus	Platformer	Christian Whitehead, Headcannon, PagodaWest Games	Nintendo Switch	Yes	Yes	Yes	
2018	Toaru Majutsu no Virtual-On	Action, Fighting	Sega, Access Games	PlayStation Vita	Yes			
2018	Toaru Majutsu no Virtual-On	Action, Fighting	Sega, Access Games	PlayStation 4	Yes			
2018	Total War Saga: Thrones of Britannia	Strategy	Creative Assembly	Microsoft Windows		Yes	Yes	
2018	Two Point Hospital	Simulation	Two Point Studios	Microsoft Windows		Yes	Yes	
2018	Valkyria Chronicles	Strategy	Sega, Media.Vision	Nintendo Switch	Yes	Yes	Yes	
2018	Valkyria Chronicles 4	Strategy	Sega, Media.Vision	PlayStation 4	Yes	Yes	Yes	
2018	Valkyria Chronicles 4	Strategy	Sega, Media.Vision	Xbox One		Yes	Yes	
2018	Valkyria Chronicles 4	Strategy	Sega, Media.Vision	Nintendo Switch	Yes	Yes	Yes	
2018	Valkyria Chronicles 4	Strategy	Sega, Media.Vision	Microsoft Windows		Yes	Yes	
2018	VR Figure from Shining: Kirika Towa Alma	Non-game	Sega, Media.Vision	PlayStation 4	Yes			
2018	Yakuza 0	Action adventure	Sega (Ryu Ga Gotoku Studio)	Microsoft Windows		Yes	Yes	
2018	Yakuza 3 Remastered	Action adventure	Sega (Ryu Ga Gotoku Studio)	PlayStation 4	Yes	Yes	Yes	
2019	Alien Isolation	FPS	Creative Assembly	Nintendo Switch		Yes	Yes	
2019	Blade Arcus Rebellion from Shining	Fighting	Studio Saizensen	PlayStation 4	Yes			
2019	Blade Arcus Rebellion from Shining	Fighting	Studio Saizensen	Nintendo Switch	Yes			
2019	Citizen of Space	RPG	Eden of Industries	PlayStation 4		Yes	Yes	
2019	Citizen of Space	RPG	Eden of Industries	Xbox One		Yes	Yes	
2019	Citizen of Space	RPG	Eden of Industries	Nintendo Switch		Yes	Yes	
2019	Citizen of Space	RPG	Eden of Industries	Microsoft Windows		Yes	Yes	
2019	Cyber Troopers Virtual-On Masterpiece 1995~2001	Action, Fighting	Sega	PlayStation 4	Yes			
2019	Football Manager 2020	Sports, Simulation	Sports Interactive	Microsoft Windows		Yes	Yes	
2019	Love Thyself - A Horatio Story	Adventure	Amplitude Studios	Microsoft Windows		Yes	Yes	
2019	Mario & Sonic at the Olympic Games: Tokyo 2020	Sports	Sega	Nintendo Switch	Yes			
2019	Puyo Puyo Champions	Puzzle	Sega	Xbox One		Yes	Yes	
2019	Puyo Puyo Champions	Puzzle	Sega	Microsoft Windows	Yes	Yes	Yes	
2019	Sakura Wars	Adventure, Action RPG	Sega	PlayStation 4	Yes	Yes	Yes	
2019	Sega Ages:Alex Kidd in Miracle World	Platform	M2	Nintendo Switch	Yes	Yes	Yes	
2019	Sega Ages:Columns II: The Voyage Through Time	Puzzle	M2	Nintendo Switch	Yes	Yes	Yes	
2019	Sega Ages:Fantasy Zone	Shoot em' up	M2	Nintendo Switch	Yes	Yes	Yes	
2019	Sega Ages:Puyo Puyo	Puzzle	M2	Nintendo Switch	Yes	Yes	Yes	
2019	Sega Ages:Puzzle & Action: Ichidant-R	Puzzle	M2	Nintendo Switch	Yes	Yes	Yes	
2019	Sega Ages:Shinobi	Action	M2	Nintendo Switch	Yes	Yes	Yes	
2019	Sega Ages:Space Harrier	Shoot em' up	M2	Nintendo Switch	Yes	Yes	Yes	
2019	Sega Ages:Virtua Racing	Racing	M2	Nintendo Switch	Yes	Yes	Yes	
2019	Sega Ages:Wonder Boy in Monster Land	Platform	M2	Nintendo Switch	Yes	Yes	Yes	
2019	Sega Genesis Mini	Compilation	M2	Sega Genesis Mini	Yes	Yes	Yes	
2019	SolSeraph	Action	Ace Team	PlayStation 4		Yes	Yes	
2019	SolSeraph	Action	Ace Team	Xbox One		Yes	Yes	
2019	SolSeraph	Action	Ace Team	Nintendo Switch		Yes	Yes	
2019	SolSeraph	Action	Ace Team	Microsoft Windows		Yes	Yes	
2019	Super Monkey Ball Banana Blitz HD	Platform, Puzzle	Sega (Ryu Ga Gotoku Studio)	PlayStation 4	Yes	Yes	Yes	
2019	Super Monkey Ball Banana Blitz HD	Platform, Puzzle	Sega (Ryu Ga Gotoku Studio)	Xbox One		Yes	Yes	
2019	Super Monkey Ball Banana Blitz HD	Platform, Puzzle	Sega (Ryu Ga Gotoku Studio)	Nintendo Switch	Yes	Yes	Yes	
2019	Super Monkey Ball Banana Blitz HD	Platform, Puzzle	Sega (Ryu Ga Gotoku Studio)	Microsoft Windows	Yes	Yes	Yes	
2019	Team Sonic Racing	Racing	Sumo Digital	PlayStation 4	Yes	Yes	Yes	
2019	Team Sonic Racing	Racing	Sumo Digital	Xbox One		Yes	Yes	
2019	Team Sonic Racing	Racing	Sumo Digital	Nintendo Switch	Yes	Yes	Yes	
2019	Team Sonic Racing	Racing	Sumo Digital	Microsoft Windows	Yes	Yes	Yes	
2019	Total War: Three Kingdoms	Strategy	Creative Assembly	Microsoft Windows		Yes	Yes	
2019	Olympic Games Tokyo 2020: The Official Video Game	Sports	Sega	PlayStation 4	Yes	Yes	Yes	
2019	Olympic Games Tokyo 2020: The Official Video Game	Sports	Sega	Nintendo Switch	Yes	Yes	Yes	
2019	Yakuza 4 Remastered	Action adventure	Sega (Ryu Ga Gotoku Studio)	PlayStation 4	Yes	Yes	Yes	
2019	Yakuza 5 Remastered	Action adventure	Sega (Ryu Ga Gotoku Studio)	PlayStation 4	Yes	Yes	Yes	
2019	Yakuza Kiwami	Action adventure	Sega (Ryu Ga Gotoku Studio)	Microsoft Windows		Yes	Yes	
2019	Yakuza Kiwami 2	Action adventure	Sega (Ryu Ga Gotoku Studio)	Microsoft Windows		Yes	Yes	
2020	Armor of Heroes	Action	The Eccentric Ape	Microsoft Windows		Yes	Yes	
2020	Astro City Mini (Software)	Compilation	Zuiki	Astro City Mini	Yes	Yes	Yes	
2020	Bayonetta	Action	Armature Studio	PlayStation 4	Yes	Yes	Yes	
2020	Bayonetta	Action	Armature Studio	Xbox One		Yes	Yes	
2020	Endless Zone	Shoot em' up	The Eccentric Ape	Microsoft Windows		Yes	Yes	
2020	Football Manager 2021	Simulation	Sports Interactive	Microsoft Windows		Yes	Yes	
2020	Game Gear Micro Red (Software)	Compilation	M2	Game Gear Micro	Yes			
2020	Game Gear Micro Black (Software)	Compilation	M2	Game Gear Micro	Yes			
2020	Game Gear Micro Blue (Software)	Compilation	M2	Game Gear Micro	Yes			
2020	Game Gear Micro Yellow (Software)	Compilation	M2	Game Gear Micro	Yes			
2020	Golden Axed	Action	Sega Studio Australia	Microsoft Windows		Yes	Yes	
2020	Hatsune Miku: Project Diva MegaMix	Rhythm	Sega (AM2)	Nintendo Switch	Yes	Yes	Yes	
2020	Sega Ages G-LOC: Air Battle	Rail shooter	M2	Nintendo Switch	Yes	Yes	Yes	
2020	Sega Ages:Herzog Zwei	RTS	M2	Nintendo Switch	Yes	Yes	Yes	
2020	Sega Ages:Puyo Puyo 2	Puzzle	M2	Nintendo Switch	Yes	Yes	Yes	
2020	Sega Ages:Sonic the Hedgehog 2	Platform	M2	Nintendo Switch	Yes	Yes	Yes	
2020	Sega Ages:Thunder Force AC	Shoot em' up	M2	Nintendo Switch	Yes	Yes	Yes	
2020	Streets of Kamurocho	Action	Empty Clip Studios	Microsoft Windows		Yes	Yes	
2020	Phantasy Star Online 2	Action RPG	Sega	Xbox One	Yes	Yes	Yes	
2020	Puyo Puyo Tetris 2	Puzzle	Sega	PlayStation 4	Yes	Yes	Yes	
2020	Puyo Puyo Tetris 2	Puzzle	Sega	PlayStation 5	Yes	Yes	Yes	
2020	Puyo Puyo Tetris 2	Puzzle	Sega	Xbox One	Yes	Yes	Yes	
2020	Puyo Puyo Tetris 2	Puzzle	Sega	Xbox Series X	Yes	Yes	Yes	
2020	Puyo Puyo Tetris 2	Puzzle	Sega	Nintendo Switch	Yes	Yes	Yes	
2020	Puyo Puyo Tetris 2	Puzzle	Sega	Microsoft Windows	Yes	Yes	Yes	
2020	Two Point Hospital	Simulation	Two Point Studios	PlayStation 4		Yes	Yes	
2020	Two Point Hospital	Simulation	Two Point Studios	Xbox One		Yes	Yes	
2020	Two Point Hospital	Simulation	Two Point Studios	Nintendo Switch		Yes	Yes	
2020	Vanquish	TPS	Armature Studio	PlayStation 4	Yes	Yes	Yes	
2020	Vanquish	TPS	Armature Studio	Xbox One		Yes	Yes	
2020	Yakuza 0	Action adventure	Sega (Ryu Ga Gotoku Studio)	Xbox One		Yes	Yes	
2020	Yakuza Kiwami	Action adventure	Sega (Ryu Ga Gotoku Studio)	Xbox One		Yes	Yes	
2020	Yakuza Kiwami 2	Action adventure	Sega (Ryu Ga Gotoku Studio)	Xbox One		Yes	Yes	
2020	Yakuza: Like A Dragon	RPG	Sega (Ryu Ga Gotoku Studio)	PlayStation 4	Yes	Yes	Yes	
2020	Yakuza: Like A Dragon	RPG	Sega (Ryu Ga Gotoku Studio)	Xbox One		Yes	Yes	
2020	Yakuza: Like A Dragon	RPG	Sega (Ryu Ga Gotoku Studio)	Xbox Series X		Yes	Yes	
2020	Yakuza: Like A Dragon	RPG	Sega (Ryu Ga Gotoku Studio)	Microsoft Windows		Yes	Yes	
2021	Demon Slayer -Kimetsu no Yaiba- The Hinokami Chronicles	Fighting	CyberConnect2	PlayStation 4		Yes	Yes	
2021	Demon Slayer -Kimetsu no Yaiba- The Hinokami Chronicles	Fighting	CyberConnect2	PlayStation 5		Yes	Yes	
2021	Demon Slayer -Kimetsu no Yaiba- The Hinokami Chronicles	Fighting	CyberConnect2	Xbox One		Yes	Yes	
2021	Demon Slayer -Kimetsu no Yaiba- The Hinokami Chronicles	Fighting	CyberConnect2	Xbox Series X		Yes	Yes	
2021	Demon Slayer -Kimetsu no Yaiba- The Hinokami Chronicles	Fighting	CyberConnect2	Microsoft Windows		Yes	Yes	
2021	Football Manager 2022	Simulation	Sports Interactive	Microsoft Windows		Yes	Yes	
2021	Humankind	Strategy	Amplitude Studios	Microsoft Windows		Yes	Yes	
2021	Judgment	Action adventure	Sega (Ryu Ga Gotoku Studio)	PlayStation 5	Yes	Yes	Yes	
2021	Judgment	Action adventure	Sega (Ryu Ga Gotoku Studio)	Xbox Series X	Yes	Yes	Yes	
2021	Judgment	Action adventure	Sega (Ryu Ga Gotoku Studio)	Stadia		Yes	Yes	
2021	Lost Judgment	Action adventure	Sega (Ryu Ga Gotoku Studio)	PlayStation 4	Yes	Yes	Yes	
2021	Lost Judgment	Action adventure	Sega (Ryu Ga Gotoku Studio)	PlayStation 5	Yes	Yes	Yes	
2021	Lost Judgment	Action adventure	Sega (Ryu Ga Gotoku Studio)	Xbox One	Yes	Yes	Yes	
2021	Lost Judgment	Action adventure	Sega (Ryu Ga Gotoku Studio)	Xbox Series X	Yes	Yes	Yes	
2021	Phantasy Star Online 2: New Genesis	Action RPG, MMO	Sega	PlayStation 4	Yes			
2021	Phantasy Star Online 2: New Genesis	Action RPG, MMO	Sega	Xbox One		Yes	Yes	
2021	Phantasy Star Online 2: New Genesis	Action RPG, MMO	Sega	Xbox Series X		Yes	Yes	
2021	Phantasy Star Online 2: New Genesis	Action RPG, MMO	Sega	Nintendo Switch	Yes			
2021	Phantasy Star Online 2: New Genesis	Action RPG, MMO	Sega	Microsoft Windows	Yes	Yes	Yes	
2021	Sonic Colors: Ultimate	Platform	Blind Squirrel Games	PlayStation 4	Yes	Yes	Yes	
2021	Sonic Colors: Ultimate	Platform	Blind Squirrel Games	Xbox One		Yes	Yes	
2021	Sonic Colors: Ultimate	Platform	Blind Squirrel Games	Nintendo Switch	Yes	Yes	Yes	
2021	Sonic Colors: Ultimate	Platform	Blind Squirrel Games	Microsoft Windows	Yes	Yes	Yes	
2021	Super Monkey Ball: Banana Mania	Platform, Puzzle	Sega (Ryu Ga Gotoku Studio)	PlayStation 4	Yes	Yes	Yes	
2021	Super Monkey Ball: Banana Mania	Platform, Puzzle	Sega (Ryu Ga Gotoku Studio)	PlayStation 5	Yes	Yes	Yes	
2021	Super Monkey Ball: Banana Mania	Platform, Puzzle	Sega (Ryu Ga Gotoku Studio)	Xbox One		Yes	Yes	
2021	Super Monkey Ball: Banana Mania	Platform, Puzzle	Sega (Ryu Ga Gotoku Studio)	Xbox Series X		Yes	Yes	
2021	Super Monkey Ball: Banana Mania	Platform, Puzzle	Sega (Ryu Ga Gotoku Studio)	Nintendo Switch	Yes	Yes	Yes	
2021	Super Monkey Ball: Banana Mania	Platform, Puzzle	Sega (Ryu Ga Gotoku Studio)	Microsoft Windows	Yes	Yes	Yes	
2021	Total War: Rome Remastered	Strategy	Creative Assembly	Microsoft Windows		Yes	Yes	
2021	Total War: Warhammer III	Strategy	Creative Assembly	Microsoft Windows		Yes	Yes	
2021	Olympic Games Tokyo 2020: The Official Video Game	Sports	Sega	Xbox One		Yes	Yes	
2021	Olympic Games Tokyo 2020: The Official Video Game	Sports	Sega	Microsoft Windows		Yes	Yes	
2021	Virtua Fighter 5: Ultimate Showdown	Fighting	Sega (Ryu Ga Gotoku Studio, AM2)	PlayStation 4	Yes	Yes	Yes	
2021	Yakuza 3 Remastered	Action adventure	Sega (Ryu Ga Gotoku Studio)	Xbox One		Yes	Yes	
2021	Yakuza 3 Remastered	Action adventure	Sega (Ryu Ga Gotoku Studio)	Microsoft Windows		Yes	Yes	
2021	Yakuza 4 Remastered	Action adventure	Sega (Ryu Ga Gotoku Studio)	Xbox One		Yes	Yes	
2021	Yakuza 4 Remastered	Action adventure	Sega (Ryu Ga Gotoku Studio)	Microsoft Windows		Yes	Yes	
2021	Yakuza 5 Remastered	Action adventure	Sega (Ryu Ga Gotoku Studio)	Xbox One		Yes	Yes	
2021	Yakuza 5 Remastered	Action adventure	Sega (Ryu Ga Gotoku Studio)	Microsoft Windows		Yes	Yes	
2021	Yakuza 6: The Song of Life	Action adventure	Sega (Ryu Ga Gotoku Studio)	Xbox One		Yes	Yes	
2021	Yakuza 6: The Song of Life	Action adventure	Sega (Ryu Ga Gotoku Studio)	Microsoft Windows		Yes	Yes	
2021	Yakuza: Like A Dragon	RPG	Sega (Ryu Ga Gotoku Studio)	PlayStation 5	Yes	Yes	Yes	
2022	Astro City Mini V (Software)	Compilation	Zuiki	Astro City Mini V	Yes			
2022	Demon Slayer -Kimetsu no Yaiba- The Hinokami Chronicles	Fighting	CyberConnect2	Nintendo Switch		Yes	Yes	
2022	Football Manager 2023	Simulation	Sports Interactive	PlayStation 4		Yes	Yes	
2022	Football Manager 2023	Simulation	Sports Interactive	PlayStation 5		Yes	Yes	
2022	Football Manager 2023	Simulation	Sports Interactive	Xbox Series X		Yes	Yes	
2022	Football Manager 2023	Simulation	Sports Interactive	Nintendo Switch		Yes	Yes	
2022	Football Manager 2023	Simulation	Sports Interactive	Microsoft Windows		Yes	Yes	
2022	Hatsune Miku: Project Diva MegaMix	Rhythm	Sega	Microsoft Windows	Yes	Yes	Yes	
2022	Judgment	Action adventure	Sega (Ryu Ga Gotoku Studio)	Microsoft Windows	Yes	Yes	Yes	
2022	Lost Judgment	Action adventure	Sega (Ryu Ga Gotoku Studio)	Microsoft Windows	Yes	Yes	Yes	
2022	Sega Genesis Mini 2	Compilation	M2	Sega Genesis Mini 2	Yes	Yes	Yes	
2022	Sonic Frontiers	Platform	Sega (Sonic Team)	PlayStation 4	Yes	Yes	Yes	
2022	Sonic Frontiers	Platform	Sega (Sonic Team)	PlayStation 5	Yes	Yes	Yes	
2022	Sonic Frontiers	Platform	Sega (Sonic Team)	Xbox Series X	Yes	Yes	Yes	
2022	Sonic Frontiers	Platform	Sega (Sonic Team)	Nintendo Switch	Yes	Yes	Yes	
2022	Sonic Frontiers	Platform	Sega (Sonic Team)	Microsoft Windows	Yes	Yes	Yes	
2022	Sonic Origins	Platform	Sega (Sonic Team), Headcannon	PlayStation 4	Yes	Yes	Yes	
2022	Sonic Origins	Platform	Sega (Sonic Team), Headcannon	PlayStation 5	Yes	Yes	Yes	
2022	Sonic Origins	Platform	Sega (Sonic Team), Headcannon	Xbox Series X	Yes	Yes	Yes	
2022	Sonic Origins	Platform	Sega (Sonic Team), Headcannon	Xbox One	Yes	Yes	Yes	
2022	Sonic Origins	Platform	Sega (Sonic Team), Headcannon	Nintendo Switch	Yes	Yes	Yes	
2022	Sonic Origins	Platform	Sega (Sonic Team), Headcannon	Microsoft Windows	Yes	Yes	Yes	
2022	Two Point Campus	Simulation	Two Point Studios	PlayStation 4		Yes	Yes	
2022	Two Point Campus	Simulation	Two Point Studios	PlayStation 5		Yes	Yes	
2022	Two Point Campus	Simulation	Two Point Studios	Xbox Series X		Yes	Yes	
2022	Two Point Campus	Simulation	Two Point Studios	Nintendo Switch		Yes	Yes	
2022	Two Point Campus	Simulation	Two Point Studios	Microsoft Windows		Yes	Yes	
2023	Company of Heroes 3	Strategy	Relic Entertainment	Microsoft Windows		Yes	Yes	
2023	Company of Heroes 3	Strategy	Relic Entertainment	PlayStation 5		Yes	Yes	
2023	Company of Heroes 3	Strategy	Relic Entertainment	Xbox Series X		Yes	Yes	
2023	Endless Dungeon	Action RPG	Amplitude Studios	PlayStation 4		Yes	Yes	
2023	Endless Dungeon	Action RPG	Amplitude Studios	PlayStation 5		Yes	Yes	
2023	Endless Dungeon	Action RPG	Amplitude Studios	Xbox Series X		Yes	Yes	
2023	Endless Dungeon	Action RPG	Amplitude Studios	Nintendo Switch		Yes	Yes	
2023	Endless Dungeon	Action RPG	Amplitude Studios	Microsoft Windows		Yes	Yes	
2023	Football Manager 2024	Simulation	Amplitude Studios	PlayStation 4		Yes	Yes	
2023	Football Manager 2024	Simulation	Amplitude Studios	PlayStation 5		Yes	Yes	
2023	Football Manager 2024	Simulation	Amplitude Studios	Xbox Series X		Yes	Yes	
2023	Football Manager 2024	Simulation	Amplitude Studios	Nintendo Switch		Yes	Yes	
2023	Football Manager 2024	Simulation	Amplitude Studios	Microsoft Windows		Yes	Yes	
2023	Humankind	Strategy	Amplitude Studios	PlayStation 4		Yes	Yes	
2023	Humankind	Strategy	Amplitude Studios	PlayStation 5		Yes	Yes	
2023	Humankind	Strategy	Amplitude Studios	Xbox One		Yes	Yes	
2023	Humankind	Strategy	Amplitude Studios	Xbox Series X		Yes	Yes	
2023	Like a Dragon: Ishin!	Action adventure	Sega (Ryu Ga Gotoku Studio)	PlayStation 4	Yes	Yes	Yes	
2023	Like a Dragon: Ishin!	Action adventure	Sega (Ryu Ga Gotoku Studio)	PlayStation 5	Yes	Yes	Yes	
2023	Like a Dragon: Ishin!	Action adventure	Sega (Ryu Ga Gotoku Studio)	Xbox One	Yes	Yes	Yes	
2023	Like a Dragon: Ishin!	Action adventure	Sega (Ryu Ga Gotoku Studio)	Xbox Series X	Yes	Yes	Yes	
2023	Like a Dragon: Ishin!	Action adventure	Sega (Ryu Ga Gotoku Studio)	Microsoft Windows	Yes	Yes	Yes	
2023	Like a Dragon Gaiden: The Man Who Erased His Name	Action adventure	Sega (Ryu Ga Gotoku Studio)	PlayStation 4	Yes	Yes	Yes	
2023	Like a Dragon Gaiden: The Man Who Erased His Name	Action adventure	Sega (Ryu Ga Gotoku Studio)	PlayStation 5	Yes	Yes	Yes	
2023	Like a Dragon Gaiden: The Man Who Erased His Name	Action adventure	Sega (Ryu Ga Gotoku Studio)	Xbox One	Yes	Yes	Yes	
2023	Like a Dragon Gaiden: The Man Who Erased His Name	Action adventure	Sega (Ryu Ga Gotoku Studio)	Xbox Series X	Yes	Yes	Yes	
2023	Like a Dragon Gaiden: The Man Who Erased His Name	Action adventure	Sega (Ryu Ga Gotoku Studio)	Microsoft Windows	Yes	Yes	Yes	
2023	Samba de Amigo: Party Central	Rhythm	Sega	Nintendo Switch	Yes	Yes	Yes	
2023	Samba de Amigo: Virtual Party	Rhythm	Sega	Meta Quest	Yes	Yes	Yes	
2023	Sonic Origins Plus	Action	Sega (Sonic Team), Headcannon	PlayStation 4	Yes	Yes	Yes	
2023	Sonic Origins Plus	Action	Sega (Sonic Team), Headcannon	PlayStation 5	Yes	Yes	Yes	
2023	Sonic Origins Plus	Action	Sega (Sonic Team), Headcannon	Xbox Series X	Yes	Yes	Yes	
2023	Sonic Origins Plus	Action	Sega (Sonic Team), Headcannon	Xbox One	Yes	Yes	Yes	
2023	Sonic Origins Plus	Action	Sega (Sonic Team), Headcannon	Nintendo Switch	Yes	Yes	Yes	
2023	Sonic Origins Plus	Action	Sega (Sonic Team), Headcannon	Microsoft Windows	Yes	Yes		
2023	Sonic Superstars	Platform	Sega (Sonic Team), Arzest	PlayStation 4	Yes	Yes	Yes	
2023	Sonic Superstars	Platform	Sega (Sonic Team), Arzest	PlayStation 5	Yes	Yes	Yes	
2023	Sonic Superstars	Platform	Sega (Sonic Team), Arzest	Xbox One	Yes	Yes	Yes	
2023	Sonic Superstars	Platform	Sega (Sonic Team), Arzest	Xbox Series X	Yes	Yes	Yes	
2023	Sonic Superstars	Platform	Sega (Sonic Team), Arzest	Nintendo Switch	Yes	Yes	Yes	
2023	Sonic Superstars	Platform	Sega (Sonic Team), Arzest	Windows	Yes	Yes	Yes	
2023	The Murder of Sonic the Hedgehog	Visual novel, point-and-click adventure	Sega of America	Microsoft Windows	Yes	Yes	Yes	
2023	Total War: Pharaoh	Strategy	Creative Assembly	Windows		Yes	Yes	
2024	Demon Slayer -Kimetsu no Yaiba- Sweep the Board!	Party	Aniplex	Nintendo Switch	Yes	Yes	Yes	
2024	Like a Dragon: Infinite Wealth	RPG	Sega (Ryu Ga Gotoku Studio)	PlayStation 4	Yes	Yes	Yes	
2024	Like a Dragon: Infinite Wealth	RPG	Sega (Ryu Ga Gotoku Studio)	PlayStation 5	Yes	Yes	Yes	
2024	Like a Dragon: Infinite Wealth	RPG	Sega (Ryu Ga Gotoku Studio)	Xbox One	Yes	Yes	Yes	
2024	Like a Dragon: Infinite Wealth	RPG	Sega (Ryu Ga Gotoku Studio)	Xbox Series X	Yes	Yes	Yes	
2024	Like a Dragon: Infinite Wealth	RPG	Sega (Ryu Ga Gotoku Studio)	Microsoft Windows	Yes	Yes	Yes	
2024	Sonic X Shadow Generations	Platform	Sega (Sonic Team)	PlayStation 4	Yes	Yes	Yes	
2024	Sonic X Shadow Generations	Platform	Sega (Sonic Team)	PlayStation 5	Yes	Yes	Yes	
2024	Sonic X Shadow Generations	Platform	Sega (Sonic Team)	Xbox One	Yes	Yes	Yes	
2024	Sonic X Shadow Generations	Platform	Sega (Sonic Team)	Xbox Series X	Yes	Yes	Yes	
2024	Sonic X Shadow Generations	Platform	Sega (Sonic Team)	Nintendo Switch	Yes	Yes	Yes	
2024	Sonic X Shadow Generations	Platform	Sega (Sonic Team)	Microsoft Windows	Yes	Yes	Yes	
2024	Super Monkey Ball: Banana Rumble	Platform, Puzzle	Sega (Ryu Ga Gotoku Studio)	Nintendo Switch	Yes	Yes	Yes	
2024	Yakuza Kiwami	Action adventure	Sega (Ryu Ga Gotoku Studio)	Nintendo Switch	Yes	Yes	Yes	
2025	Demon Slayer -Kimetsu no Yaiba- The Hinokami Chronicles 2	Fighting	CyberConnect2	PlayStation 4		Yes	Yes	
2025	Demon Slayer -Kimetsu no Yaiba- The Hinokami Chronicles 2	Fighting	CyberConnect2	PlayStation 5		Yes	Yes	
2025	Demon Slayer -Kimetsu no Yaiba- The Hinokami Chronicles 2	Fighting	CyberConnect2	Xbox One		Yes	Yes	
2025	Demon Slayer -Kimetsu no Yaiba- The Hinokami Chronicles 2	Fighting	CyberConnect2	Xbox Series X		Yes	Yes	
2025	Demon Slayer -Kimetsu no Yaiba- The Hinokami Chronicles 2	Fighting	CyberConnect2	Nintendo Switch		Yes	Yes	
2025	Demon Slayer -Kimetsu no Yaiba- The Hinokami Chronicles 2	Fighting	CyberConnect2	Microsoft Windows		Yes	Yes	
2025	Like A Dragon: Pirate Yakuza in Hawaii	Action adventure	Sega (Ryu Ga Gotoku Studio)	PlayStation 4	Yes	Yes	Yes	
2025	Like A Dragon: Pirate Yakuza in Hawaii	Action adventure	Sega (Ryu Ga Gotoku Studio)	PlayStation 5	Yes	Yes	Yes	
2025	Like A Dragon: Pirate Yakuza in Hawaii	Action adventure	Sega (Ryu Ga Gotoku Studio)	Xbox One	Yes	Yes	Yes	
2025	Like A Dragon: Pirate Yakuza in Hawaii	Action adventure	Sega (Ryu Ga Gotoku Studio)	Xbox Series X	Yes	Yes	Yes	
2025	Like A Dragon: Pirate Yakuza in Hawaii	Action adventure	Sega (Ryu Ga Gotoku Studio)	Microsoft Windows	Yes	Yes	Yes	
2025	Puyo Puyo Tetris 2S	Puzzle	Sega	Nintendo Switch 2	Yes	Yes	Yes	
2025	Shinobi: Art of Vengeance	Action	Lizardcube	PlayStation 4	Yes	Yes	Yes	
2025	Shinobi: Art of Vengeance	Action	Lizardcube	PlayStation 5	Yes	Yes	Yes	
2025	Shinobi: Art of Vengeance	Action	Lizardcube	Xbox Series X	Yes	Yes	Yes	
2025	Shinobi: Art of Vengeance	Action	Lizardcube	Nintendo Switch	Yes	Yes	Yes	
2025	Shinobi: Art of Vengeance	Action	Lizardcube	Microsoft Windows	Yes	Yes	Yes	
2025	Sonic Racing Crossworlds	Racing	Sega (Sonic Team)	PlayStation 4	Yes	Yes	Yes	
2025	Sonic Racing Crossworlds	Racing	Sega (Sonic Team)	PlayStation 5	Yes	Yes	Yes	
2025	Sonic Racing Crossworlds	Racing	Sega (Sonic Team)	Xbox Series X	Yes	Yes	Yes	
2025	Sonic Racing Crossworlds	Racing	Sega (Sonic Team)	Nintendo Switch	Yes	Yes	Yes	
2025	Sonic Racing Crossworlds	Racing	Sega (Sonic Team)	Microsoft Windows	Yes	Yes	Yes	
2025	Sonic Rumble	Action	Sega, Rovio Entertainment	Microsoft Windows	Yes	Yes	Yes	
2025	Two Point Museum	Simulation	Two Point Studios	PlayStation 5	Yes	Yes	Yes	
2025	Two Point Museum	Simulation	Two Point Studios	Xbox Series X	Yes	Yes	Yes	
2025	Two Point Museum	Simulation	Two Point Studios	Microsoft Windows	Yes	Yes	Yes	
2025	Virtua Fighter 5 R.E.V.O.	Fighting	Sega (Ryu Ga Gotoku Studio, AM2)	PlayStation 5	Yes	Yes	Yes	
2025	Virtua Fighter 5 R.E.V.O.	Fighting	Sega (Ryu Ga Gotoku Studio, AM2)	Xbox Series X	Yes	Yes	Yes	
2025	Virtua Fighter 5 R.E.V.O.	Fighting	Sega (Ryu Ga Gotoku Studio, AM2)	Microsoft Windows	Yes	Yes	Yes	
2025	Warhammer: 40.000 Space Marine	TPS	Relic Entertainment	Xbox Series X	Yes	Yes	Yes	
2025	Warhammer: 40.000 Space Marine	TPS	Relic Entertainment	Microsoft Windows	Yes	Yes	Yes	
2025	Yakuza 0: Director's Cut	Action adventure	Sega (Ryu Ga Gotoku Studio)	PlayStation 5	Yes	Yes	Yes	
2025	Yakuza 0: Director's Cut	Action adventure	Sega (Ryu Ga Gotoku Studio)	Xbox Series X	Yes	Yes	Yes	
2025	Yakuza 0: Director's Cut	Action adventure	Sega (Ryu Ga Gotoku Studio)	Nintendo Switch 2	Yes	Yes	Yes	
2025	Yakuza 0: Director's Cut	Action adventure	Sega (Ryu Ga Gotoku Studio)	Microsoft Windows	Yes	Yes	Yes	
2025	Yakuza Kiwami	Action adventure	Sega (Ryu Ga Gotoku Studio)	PlayStation 5	Yes	Yes	Yes	
2025	Yakuza Kiwami	Action adventure	Sega (Ryu Ga Gotoku Studio)	Xbox Series X	Yes	Yes	Yes	
2025	Yakuza Kiwami	Action adventure	Sega (Ryu Ga Gotoku Studio)	Nintendo Switch 2	Yes	Yes	Yes	
2025	Yakuza Kiwami 2	Action adventure	Sega (Ryu Ga Gotoku Studio)	PlayStation 5	Yes	Yes	Yes	
2025	Yakuza Kiwami 2	Action adventure	Sega (Ryu Ga Gotoku Studio)	Xbox Series X	Yes	Yes	Yes	
2025	Yakuza Kiwami 2	Action adventure	Sega (Ryu Ga Gotoku Studio)	Nintendo Switch 2	Yes	Yes	Yes	
2026	SEGA Football Club Champions	Sports, Simulation	Sega	PlayStation 4	Yes	Yes	Yes	
2026	SEGA Football Club Champions	Sports, Simulation	Sega	PlayStation 5	Yes	Yes	Yes	
2026	SEGA Football Club Champions	Sports, Simulation	Sega	Microsoft Windows	Yes	Yes	Yes	
2026	Virtua Fighter 5 R.E.V.O.	Fighting	Sega (Ryu Ga Gotoku Studio, AM2)	Nintendo Switch 2	Yes	Yes	Yes	
2026	Yakuza Kiwami 3 & Dark Ties	Action adventure	Sega (Ryu Ga Gotoku Studio)	PlayStation 4	Yes	Yes	Yes	
2026	Yakuza Kiwami 3 & Dark Ties	Action adventure	Sega (Ryu Ga Gotoku Studio)	PlayStation 5	Yes	Yes	Yes	
2026	Yakuza Kiwami 3 & Dark Ties	Action adventure	Sega (Ryu Ga Gotoku Studio)	Xbox One	Yes	Yes	Yes	
2026	Yakuza Kiwami 3 & Dark Ties	Action adventure	Sega (Ryu Ga Gotoku Studio)	Xbox Series X	Yes	Yes	Yes	
2026	Yakuza Kiwami 3 & Dark Ties	Action adventure	Sega (Ryu Ga Gotoku Studio)	Nintendo Switch 2	Yes	Yes	Yes	
2026	Yakuza Kiwami 3 & Dark Ties	Action adventure	Sega (Ryu Ga Gotoku Studio)	Microsoft Windows	Yes	Yes	Yes	
2027	Alien: Isolation 2	FPS	Creative Assembly	PlayStation 5	Yes	Yes	Yes	
2027	Alien: Isolation 2	FPS	Creative Assembly	Xbox Series X	Yes	Yes	Yes	
2027	Alien: Isolation 2	FPS	Creative Assembly	Nintendo Switch 2	Yes	Yes	Yes	
2027	Alien: Isolation 2	FPS	Creative Assembly	Microsoft Windows	Yes	Yes	Yes	
2027	Crazy Taxi: World Tour	Driving	Sega	PlayStation 5	Yes	Yes	Yes	
2027	Crazy Taxi: World Tour	Driving	Sega	Xbox Series X	Yes	Yes	Yes	
2027	Crazy Taxi: World Tour	Driving	Sega	Nintendo Switch 2	Yes	Yes	Yes	
2027	Crazy Taxi: World Tour	Driving	Sega	Microsoft Windows	Yes	Yes	Yes	
2027	Stranger Than Heaven	Action adventure	Sega (Ryu Ga Gotoku Studio)	PlayStation 5	Yes	Yes	Yes	
2027	Stranger Than Heaven	Action adventure	Sega (Ryu Ga Gotoku Studio)	Xbox Series X	Yes	Yes	Yes	
2027	Stranger Than Heaven	Action adventure	Sega (Ryu Ga Gotoku Studio)	Microsoft Windows	Yes	Yes	Yes	

== Licensed by Sega ==
Year	Title	Genre(s)	Developer(s)	Publisher(s)	System(s)	JP	NA	EU	Ref.
1982	Frogger	Action	Parker Brothers	Parker Brothers	Atari 2600		Yes	Yes	
1982	Frogger	Action	Parker Brothers	Parker Brothers	Atari 8-bit computers		Yes	Yes	
1982	Carnival	Shoot em' up	Coleco	Coleco	Atari 2600		Yes	Yes	
1982	Carnival	Shoot em' up	Coleco	Coleco	Colecovision		Yes	Yes	
1982	Carnival	Shoot em' up	Coleco	Coleco	Intellivision		Yes	Yes	
1982	Turbo	Racing	Coleco	Coleco	Colecovision		Yes	Yes	
1982	Zaxxon	Shoot em' up	Atari	Atari	Atari 2600		Yes	Yes	
1982	Zaxxon	Shoot em' up	Coleco	Coleco	Coleco Adam		Yes	Yes	
1982	Zaxxon	Shoot em' up	Coleco	Coleco	Intellivision		Yes	Yes	
1983	Buck Rogers: Planet of Zoom	Shoot em' up	Coleco	Coleco	Colecovision		Yes	Yes	
1983	Buck Rogers: Planet of Zoom	Shoot em' up	Coleco	Coleco	Coleco Adam		Yes	Yes	
1983	Buck Rogers: Planet of Zoom	Shoot em' up	Philips	Philips	MSX		Yes	Yes	
1983	Congo Bongo	Action	Beck-Tech	Beck-Tech	Apple II		Yes	Yes	
1983	Congo Bongo	Action	Coleco	Coleco	Colecovision		Yes	Yes	
1983	Congo Bongo	Action	Texas Instruments	Texas Instruments	TI-99/4A		Yes	Yes	
1983	Frogger	Action	Parker Brothers	Parker Brothers	Atari 5200		Yes	Yes	
1983	Frogger	Action	Parker Brothers	Parker Brothers	ColecoVision		Yes	Yes	
1983	Frogger	Action	Parker Brothers	Parker Brothers	Intellivision		Yes	Yes	
1983	Frogger	Action	Parker Brothers	Parker Brothers	Magnavox Oddyssey		Yes	Yes	
1983	Frogger	Action	Parker Brothers	Parker Brothers	TI-99/4A		Yes	Yes	
1983	Pengo	Action	Atari	Atari	Atari 2600		Yes	Yes	
1983	Pengo	Action	Atari	Atari	Atari 5200		Yes	Yes	
1983	Pengo	Action	Atari	Atari	Atari 8-bit		Yes	Yes	
1983	Spy Hunter	Action	U.S. Gold	U.S. Gold	BBC Micro		Yes	Yes	
1983	Spy Hunter	Action	U.S. Gold	U.S. Gold	ZX Spectrum		Yes	Yes	
1983	SubRoc-3D	Shoot em' up	Coleco	Coleco	Colecovision		Yes	Yes	
1983	SubRoc-3D	Shoot em' up	Coleco	Coleco	Coleco Adam		Yes	Yes	
1983	Turbo	Driving	Coleco	Coleco	Intellivision		Yes	Yes	
1984	Frogger II: Threeedeep!	Action	Parker Brothers	Parker Brothers	Apple II		Yes	Yes	
1984	Frogger II: Threeedeep!	Action	Parker Brothers	Parker Brothers	Atari 2600		Yes	Yes	
1984	Frogger II: Threeedeep!	Action	Parker Brothers	Parker Brothers	Atari 5200		Yes	Yes	
1984	Frogger II: Threeedeep!	Action	Parker Brothers	Parker Brothers	Atari 8-bit		Yes	Yes	
1984	Frogger II: Threeedeep!	Action	Parker Brothers	Parker Brothers	Colecovision		Yes	Yes	
1984	Frogger II: Threeedeep!	Action	Parker Brothers	Parker Brothers	Commodore 64		Yes	Yes	
1984	Frogger II: Threeedeep!	Action	Parker Brothers	Parker Brothers	IBM PC		Yes	Yes	
1986	Space Harrier	Shoot em' up	Elite Systems	Elite Systems	Amstrad CPC		Yes	Yes	
1986	Space Harrier	Shoot em' up	Elite Systems	Elite Systems	Commodore 64		Yes	Yes	
1987	Super Hang-On	Driving	Software Studios	Electric Dreams Software	Amstrad CPC		Yes	Yes	
1987	Super Hang-On	Driving	Software Studios	Electric Dreams Software	Commodore 64		Yes	Yes	
1987	Super Hang-On	Driving	Software Studios	Electric Dreams Software	ZX Spectrum		Yes	Yes	
1987	OutRun	Driving	Probe Software	U.S. Gold	Amstrad CPC		Yes	Yes	
1987	OutRun	Driving	Amazing Products	U.S. Gold	Commodore 64		Yes	Yes	
1987	OutRun	Driving	Probe Software	U.S. Gold	ZX Spectrum		Yes	Yes	
1988	After Burner	Shoot em' up	Activision	Activision	Atari ST		Yes	Yes	
1988	After Burner	Shoot em' up	MCM Software	MCM Software	MSX		Yes	Yes	
1988	After Burner	Shoot em' up	Activision	Activision	ZX Spectrum		Yes	Yes	
1988	Alien Syndrome	Action	Softek International	Mindscape	Amiga		Yes	Yes	
1988	Alien Syndrome	Action	Softek International	Mindscape	Atari ST		Yes	Yes	
1988	Alien Syndrome	Action	Softek International	ACE	Amstrad CPC		Yes	Yes	
1988	Alien Syndrome	Action	Softek International	Mindscape	Commodore 64		Yes	Yes	
1988	Alien Syndrome	Action	Softek International	ACE	MSX		Yes	Yes	
1988	Alien Syndrome	Action	Softek International	Dro Soft	ZX Spectrum		Yes	Yes	
1988	Super Hang-On	Driving	Software Studios		Atari ST		Yes	Yes	
1988	OutRun	Driving	U.S. Gold	Probe Software	Amiga		Yes	Yes	
1988	OutRun	Driving	Mindscape	Mindscape	Atari ST		Yes	Yes	
1988	OutRun	Driving	Bedrock Software	Erbe Software	MSX		Yes	Yes	
1988	Space Harrier	Shoot em' up	Elite Systems	Elite Systems	Amiga		Yes	Yes	
1988	Space Harrier	Shoot em' up	Elite Systems	Elite Systems	Atari ST		Yes	Yes	
1988	Space Harrier	Shoot em' up	Elite Systems	Elite Systems	IBM PC		Yes	Yes	
1989	Action Fighter		Firebird Software	Firebird Software	Amiga		Yes	Yes	
1989	Action Fighter		Firebird Software	Firebird Software	Amstrad CPC		Yes	Yes	
1989	Action Fighter		Firebird Software	Firebird Software	Atari ST		Yes	Yes	
1989	Action Fighter		Firebird Software	Firebird Software	Commodore 64		Yes	Yes	
1989	Action Fighter		Firebird Software	Firebird Software	IBM PC		Yes	Yes	
1989	Action Fighter		Firebird Software	Firebird Software	ZX Spectrum		Yes	Yes	
1989	After Burner	Shoot em' up	Activision	Activision	Amstrad CPC		Yes	Yes	
1989	Altered Beast	Action	NEC Avenue	Bits Labotary	PC Engine	Yes			
1989	Dynamite Dux	Action	Core Design	Activision	Amiga		Yes	Yes	
1989	Dynamite Dux	Action	Core Design	Activision	Amstrad CPC		Yes	Yes	
1989	Dynamite Dux	Action	Core Design	Activision	Atari ST		Yes	Yes	
1989	Dynamite Dux	Action	Core Design	Activision	Commodore 64		Yes	Yes	
1989	Dynamite Dux	Action	Core Design	Activision	ZX Spectrum		Yes	Yes	
1989	Passing Shot	Sports	Teque Software	Image Works	Amiga		Yes	Yes	
1989	Passing Shot	Sports	Teque Software	Image Works	Atari ST		Yes	Yes	
1989	Passing Shot	Sports	Teque Software	Image Works	Amstrad CPC		Yes	Yes	
1989	Passing Shot	Sports	Teque Software	Image Works	Commodore 64		Yes	Yes	
1989	Passing Shot	Sports	Teque Software	MCM Software	MSX		Yes	Yes	
1989	Passing Shot	Sports	Teque Software	Image Works	ZX Spectrum		Yes	Yes	
1989	Power Drift	Racing	Software Studios	Activision	Amiga		Yes	Yes	
1989	Power Drift	Racing	Software Studios	Activision	Amstrad CPC		Yes	Yes	
1989	Power Drift	Racing	Software Studios	Activision	Atari ST		Yes	Yes	
1989	Power Drift	Racing	Software Studios	Activision	Commodore 64		Yes	Yes	
1989	Power Drift	Racing	Software Studios	Activision	MSX		Yes	Yes	
1989	Power Drift	Racing	Software Studios	Activision	ZX Spectrum		Yes	Yes	
1989	SDI: Strategic Defense Initiative	Shoot em' up	Software Studios	Activision	Amiga		Yes	Yes	
1989	SDI: Strategic Defense Initiative	Shoot em' up	Software Studios	Activision	Amstrad CPC		Yes	Yes	
1989	SDI: Strategic Defense Initiative	Shoot em' up	Source Software	Activision	Atari ST		Yes	Yes	
1989	SDI: Strategic Defense Initiative	Shoot em' up	Source Software	Activision	Commodore 64		Yes	Yes	
1989	SDI: Strategic Defense Initiative	Shoot em' up	Source Software	Activision	MSX		Yes	Yes	
1989	SDI: Strategic Defense Initiative	Shoot em' up	Source Software	Activision	ZX Spectrum		Yes	Yes	
1989	Shinobi	Action	Binary Design	The Sales Curve	Amiga		Yes	Yes	
1989	Shinobi	Action	Binary Design	The Sales Curve	Amstrad CPC		Yes	Yes	
1989	Shinobi	Action	Random Access	The Sales Curve	Commodore 64		Yes	Yes	
1989	Shinobi	Action	Micromosaics	The Sales Curve	IBM PC		Yes	Yes	
1989	Shinobi	Action	Binary Design	The Sales Curve	MSX		Yes	Yes	
1989	Shinobi	Action	Binary Design	The Sales Curve	ZX Spectrum		Yes	Yes	
1989	OutRun	Driving	Unlimited Software	Mindscape	IBM PC		Yes	Yes	
1990	Altered Beast	Action	Activision	Activision	Amiga		Yes	Yes	
1990	Altered Beast	Action	Activision	Activision	Atari ST		Yes	Yes	
1990	Altered Beast	Action	Interlink	Asmik	Famicom		Yes	Yes	
1990	Altered Beast	Action	Activision	MSM Software	MSX		Yes	Yes	
1990	Altered Beast	Action	Activision	Activision	ZX Spectrum		Yes	Yes	
1990	Arnold Palmer Tournament Golf	Sports	Motivetime	Elite Systems	Amiga		Yes	Yes	
1990	Arnold Palmer Tournament Golf	Sports	Motivetime	Elite Systems	Atari ST		Yes	Yes	
1990	Crack Down	Action	Arc Developments	U.S. Gold	Amiga		Yes	Yes	
1990	Crack Down	Action	U.S. Gold	U.S. Gold	Amstrad CPC		Yes	Yes	
1990	Crack Down	Action	Arc Developments	U.S. Gold	Atari ST		Yes	Yes	
1990	Crack Down	Action	U.S. Gold	U.S. Gold	Commodore 64		Yes	Yes	
1990	Crack Down	Action	Arc Developments	U.S. Gold	ZX Spectrum		Yes	Yes	
1990	Cyber Police ESWAT	Action	Creative Materials	U.S. Gold	Amiga		Yes	Yes	
1990	Cyber Police ESWAT	Action	Creative Materials	U.S. Gold	Amstrad CPC		Yes	Yes	
1990	Cyber Police ESWAT	Action	U.S. Gold	U.S. Gold	Atari ST		Yes	Yes	
1990	Cyber Police ESWAT	Action	U.S. Gold	U.S. Gold	Commodore 64		Yes	Yes	
1990	Cyber Police ESWAT	Action	Creative Materials	U.S. Gold	ZX Spectrum		Yes	Yes	
1990	Galaxy Force II	Shoot em' up	Software Studios	Activision	Amiga		Yes	Yes	
1990	Galaxy Force II	Shoot em' up	Activision	Activision	Amstrad CPC		Yes	Yes	
1990	Galaxy Force II	Shoot em' up	Activision	Activision	Atari ST		Yes	Yes	
1990	Galaxy Force II	Shoot em' up	Software Studios	Activision	Commodore 64		Yes	Yes	
1990	Galaxy Force II	Shoot em' up	CRI	CRI	FM Towns Marty		Yes	Yes	
1990	Galaxy Force II	Shoot em' up	Software Studios	Activision	ZX Spectrum		Yes	Yes	
1990	Golden Axe	Action	Probe Software	Virgin Games	Amiga		Yes	Yes	
1990	Golden Axe	Action	Probe Software	Virgin Games	Amstrad CPC		Yes	Yes	
1990	Golden Axe	Action	Probe Software	Virgin Games	Atari ST		Yes	Yes	
1990	Golden Axe	Action	Probe Software	Virgin Games	Commodore 64		Yes	Yes	
1990	Golden Axe	Action	Probe Software	Virgin Games	IBM PC		Yes	Yes	
1990	Golden Axe	Action	Telenet Japan	Telenet Japan	PC Engine	Yes			
1990	Golden Axe	Action	Probe Software	Virgin Games	ZX Spectrum		Yes	Yes	
1990	Head-On	Action	Tecmo	Tecmo	Game Boy	Yes			
1990	Hot-Rod	Racing	Activision	Activision	Amiga		Yes	Yes	
1990	Hot-Rod	Racing	Activision	Activision	Amstrad CPC		Yes	Yes	
1990	Hot-Rod	Racing	Activision	Activision	Atari ST		Yes	Yes	
1990	Hot-Rod	Racing	Activision	Activision	Commodore 64		Yes	Yes	
1990	Hot-Rod	Racing	Activision	Activision	ZX Spectrum		Yes	Yes	
1990	Penguin Land	Puzzle	Atelier Double	Pony Canyon	Game Boy	Yes			
1990	Power Drift	Racing	Copya System	Asmik	PC Engine	Yes			
1990	Scramble Spirits	Shoot em' up	Teque Software	Grandslam	Amiga		Yes	Yes	
1990	Scramble Spirits	Shoot em' up	Teque Software	Grandslam	Atari ST		Yes	Yes	
1990	Scramble Spirits	Shoot em' up	Teque Software	Grandslam	Amstrad CPC		Yes	Yes	
1990	Scramble Spirits	Shoot em' up	Teque Software	Grandslam	Commodore 64		Yes	Yes	
1990	Scramble Spirits	Shoot em' up	Teque Software	Grandslam	MSX		Yes	Yes	
1990	Scramble Spirits	Shoot em' up	Teque Software	Grandslam	ZX Spectrum		Yes	Yes	
1990	Space Harrier II	Shoot em' up	Grandslam	Grandslam	Amiga		Yes	Yes	
1990	Space Harrier II	Shoot em' up	Grandslam	Grandslam	Amstrad CPC		Yes	Yes	
1990	Space Harrier II	Shoot em' up	Grandslam	Grandslam	Atari ST		Yes	Yes	
1990	Space Harrier II	Shoot em' up	Grandslam	Grandslam	Commodore 64		Yes	Yes	
1990	Space Harrier II	Shoot em' up	Grandslam	Grandslam	MSX		Yes	Yes	
1990	Space Harrier II	Shoot em' up	Grandslam	Grandslam	ZX Spectrum		Yes	Yes	
1990	Sonic Boom	Shoot em' up	Source	Activision	Amiga		Yes	Yes	
1990	Sonic Boom	Shoot em' up	Source	Activision	Amstrad CPC		Yes	Yes	
1990	Sonic Boom	Shoot em' up	Activision	Activision	Atari ST		Yes	Yes	
1990	Sonic Boom	Shoot em' up	Activision	Activision	Commodore 64		Yes	Yes	
1990	Sonic Boom	Shoot em' up	Activision	Activision	ZX Spectrum		Yes	Yes	
1990	Line of Fire	Shoot em' up	Creative Materials	U.S. Gold	Amstrad CPC		Yes	Yes	
1990	Line of Fire	Shoot em' up	Creative Materials	U.S. Gold	Commodore 64		Yes	Yes	
1990	Line of Fire	Shoot em' up	Creative Materials	U.S. Gold	ZX Spectrum		Yes	Yes	
1991	Alien Storm	Action	U.S. Gold	U.S. Gold	Amiga		Yes	Yes	
1991	Alien Storm	Action	Tiertex	U.S. Gold	Amstrad CPC		Yes	Yes	
1991	Alien Storm	Action	U.S. Gold	U.S. Gold	Atari ST		Yes	Yes	
1991	Alien Storm	Action	Tiertex	U.S. Gold	Commodore 54		Yes	Yes	
1991	Alien Storm	Action	Tiertex	U.S. Gold	ZX Spectrum		Yes	Yes	
1991	Bonanza Bros	Action	US. Gold	U.S. Gold	Atari ST		Yes	Yes	
1991	Bonanza Bros	Action	US. Gold	U.S. Gold	Commodore Amiga		Yes	Yes	
1991	Bonanza Bros	Action	SNS	Sharp	X68000	Yes			
1991	Last Battle	Action	Creative Materials	Elite Systems	Amiga		Yes	Yes	
1991	Last Battle	Action	Images Software	Elite Systems	Commodore 64		Yes	Yes	
1991	Line of Fire	Shoot em' up	Creative Materials	U.S. Gold	Amiga		Yes	Yes	
1991	Line of Fire	Shoot em' up	Creative Materials	U.S. Gold	Atari ST		Yes	Yes	
1991	Shadow Dancer	Action	Images	U.S. Gold	Amiga		Yes	Yes	
1991	Shadow Dancer	Action	Images	U.S. Gold	Amstrad CPC		Yes	Yes	
1991	Shadow Dancer	Action	Images	U.S. Gold	Atari ST		Yes	Yes	
1991	Shadow Dancer	Action	Images	U.S. Gold	Commodore 64		Yes	Yes	
1991	Shadow Dancer	Action	Images	U.S. Gold	ZX Spectrum		Yes	Yes	
1991	OutRun Europa	Driving	Kristallis	U.S. Gold	Amiga		Yes	Yes	
1991	OutRun Europa	Driving	Probe Software	U.S. Gold	Atari ST		Yes	Yes	
1991	OutRun Europa	Driving	Probe Software	U.S. Gold	Amstrad CPC		Yes	Yes	
1991	OutRun Europa	Driving	Probe Software	U.S. Gold	Commodore 64		Yes	Yes	
1992	Bonanza Bros	Action	U.S. Gold	U.S. Gold	Amstrad CPC		Yes	Yes	
1992	Bonanza Bros	Action	U.S. Gold	U.S. Gold	Commodore 64		Yes	Yes	
1992	Bonanza Bros	Action	NEC Avenue	NEC Avenue	PC Engine	Yes			
1992	Super Fantasy Zone	Shoot em' up	Sunsoft	Sunsoft	Genesis	Yes	Yes	Yes	
1992	G-LOC	Shoot em' up	Climax	U.S. Gold	Amiga		Yes	Yes	
1992	G-LOC	Shoot em' up	Climax	U.S. Gold	Amstrad CPC		Yes	Yes	
1992	G-LOC	Shoot em' up	Climax	U.S. Gold	Atari ST		Yes	Yes	
1992	G-LOC	Shoot em' up	Climax	U.S. Gold	Commodore 64		Yes	Yes	
1992	G-LOC	Shoot em' up	Climax	U.S. Gold	ZX Spectrum		Yes	Yes	
1992	Gain Ground	Shoot em' up	Bits Laboratory	NEC Avenue	PC Engine	Yes			
1992	OutRun Europa	Driving	Probe Software	U.S. Gold	Master System			Yes	
1992	OutRun Europa	Driving	Probe Software	U.S. Gold	Game Gear		Yes	Yes	
1995	Time Warner Interactive's VR Virtua Racing	Driving	Time Warner Interactive	Time Warner Interactive	Saturn	Yes	Yes	Yes	
1998	Pocket Puyo Puyo Sun	Puzzle	Compile	Compile	Game Boy Color	Yes			
1999	Columns GB: Tezuka Osamu Characters	Puzzle	Game Studio	Media Factory	Game Boy Color	Yes			
1999	Puyo Puyo Gaiden: Puyo Wars	Puzzle	Compile	Compile	Game Boy Color	Yes			
2000	Arle no Bouken: Mahou no Jewel	RPG	Compile	Compile	Game Boy Color	Yes			
2000	Pocket Puyo Puyo~n	Puzzle	Compile	Compile	Game Boy Color	Yes			
2000	Sakura Taisen GB: Geki Hanagumi Nyuutai!	Adventure	Jupiter	Media Factory	Game Boy Color	Yes			
2001	18 Wheeler: American Pro Trucker	Driving	Acclaim Studios	Acclaim Entertainment	PlayStation 2		Yes	Yes	
2001	Crazy Taxi	Driving	Acclaim Studios	Acclaim Entertainment	PlayStation 2		Yes	Yes	
2001	Crazy Taxi	Driving	Acclaim Studios	Acclaim Entertainment	GameCube		Yes	Yes	
2002	18 Wheeler: American Pro Trucker	Sports	Acclaim Studios	Acclaim Entertainment	GameCube		Yes	Yes	
2009	Avalon no Kagi PC	CCG, Strategy	Gamepot	Gamepot	Microsoft Windows	Yes			
2014	Bayonetta	Action	Platinum Games	Nintendo	Wii U	Yes	Yes	Yes	
2014	Bayonetta 2	Action	Platinum Games	Nintendo	Wii U	Yes	Yes	Yes	
2016	Rez Infinite	Rail shooter	Enhance Games	Enhance Games	PlayStation 4	Yes	Yes	Yes	
2016	Wonder Boy Returns	Platform	CFK	CFK	Microsoft Windows	Yes	Yes	Yes	
2017	Rez Infinite	Rail shooter	Enhance Games	Enhance Games	Microsoft Windows	Yes	Yes	Yes	
2017	Wonder Boy Returns	Platform	CFK	CFK	PlayStation 4	Yes	Yes	Yes	
2017	Wonder Boy: The Dragon's Trap	Action	Lizardcube	Dotemu	PlayStation 4	Yes	Yes	Yes	
2017	Wonder Boy: The Dragon's Trap	Action	Lizardcube	Dotemu	Xbox One	Yes	Yes	Yes	
2017	Wonder Boy: The Dragon's Trap	Action	Lizardcube	Dotemu	Nintendo Switch	Yes	Yes	Yes	
2017	Wonder Boy: The Dragon's Trap	Action	Lizardcube	Dotemu	Microsoft Windows	Yes	Yes	Yes	
2018	Bayonetta	Action	Platinum Games	Nintendo	Nintendo Switch	Yes	Yes	Yes	
2018	Bayonetta 2	Action	Platinum Games	Nintendo	Nintendo Switch	Yes	Yes	Yes	
2018	Monster Boy and the Cursed Kingdom	Platform	Game Atelier	FGD Entertainment	PlayStation 4	Yes	Yes	Yes	
2018	Monster Boy and the Cursed Kingdom	Platform	Game Atelier	FGD Entertainment	Xbox One	Yes	Yes	Yes	
2018	Monster Boy and the Cursed Kingdom	Platform	Game Atelier	FGD Entertainment	Microsoft Windows	Yes	Yes	Yes	
2018	Resonance of Fate	RPG	Tri-Ace	Tri-Ace	PlayStation 4	Yes	Yes	Yes	
2018	Resonance of Fate	RPG	Tri-Ace	Tri-Ace	Microsoft Windows	Yes	Yes	Yes	
2019	Shenmue III	Action adventure	Deep Silver	Ys Net	PlayStation 4	Yes	Yes	Yes	
2019	Shenmue III	Action adventure	Deep Silver	Ys Net	Microsoft Windows	Yes	Yes	Yes	
2019	Monster Boy and the Cursed Kingdom	Platform	Game Atelier	FGD Entertainment	Microsoft Windows	Yes	Yes	Yes	
2020	Panzer Dragoon Remake	Rail shooter	Forever Entertainment	Megapixel Studio	PlayStation 4	Yes	Yes	Yes	
2020	Panzer Dragoon Remake	Rail shooter	Forever Entertainment	Megapixel Studio	Xbox One	Yes	Yes	Yes	
2020	Panzer Dragoon Remake	Rail shooter	Forever Entertainment	Megapixel Studio	Nintendo Switch	Yes	Yes	Yes	
2020	Panzer Dragoon Remake	Rail shooter	Forever Entertainment	Megapixel Studio	Microsoft Windows	Yes	Yes	Yes	
2020	Space Channel 5 VR: Kinda Funky News Flash	Rhythm	Grounding Inc.	Grounding Inc.	PlayStation 4	Yes	Yes	Yes	
2020	Space Channel 5 VR: Kinda Funky News Flash	Rhythm	Grounding Inc.	Grounding Inc.	Microsoft Windows	Yes	Yes	Yes	
2020	Streets of Rage 4	Action	Dotemu	Lizardcube	PlayStation 4	Yes	Yes	Yes	
2020	Streets of Rage 4	Action	Dotemu	Lizardcube	Xbox One	Yes	Yes	Yes	
2020	Streets of Rage 4	Action	Dotemu	Lizardcube	Nintendo Switch	Yes	Yes	Yes	
2020	Streets of Rage 4	Action	Dotemu	Lizardcube	Microsoft Windows	Yes	Yes	Yes	
2021	Alex Kidd in Miracle World DX	Platform	Merge Games	Marge Games, Janken Team	PlayStation 4	Yes	Yes	Yes	
2021	Alex Kidd in Miracle World DX	Platform	Merge Games	Marge Games, Janken Team	PlayStation 5	Yes	Yes	Yes	
2021	Alex Kidd in Miracle World DX	Platform	Merge Games	Marge Games, Janken Team	Xbox One	Yes	Yes	Yes	
2021	Alex Kidd in Miracle World DX	Platform	Merge Games	Marge Games, Janken Team	Xbox Series X	Yes	Yes	Yes	
2021	Alex Kidd in Miracle World DX	Platform	Merge Games	Marge Games, Janken Team	Nintendo Switch	Yes	Yes	Yes	
2021	Alex Kidd in Miracle World DX	Platform	Merge Games	Marge Games, Janken Team	Microsoft Windows	Yes	Yes	Yes	
2021	The House of the Dead: Remake	Light gun shooter	Megapixel Studio	Forever Entertainment	PlayStation 4	Yes	Yes	Yes	
2021	The House of the Dead: Remake	Light gun shooter	Megapixel Studio	Forever Entertainment	Xbox One	Yes	Yes	Yes	
2021	The House of the Dead: Remake	Light gun shooter	Megapixel Studio	Forever Entertainment	Xbox Series X	Yes	Yes	Yes	
2021	The House of the Dead: Remake	Light gun shooter	Megapixel Studio	Forever Entertainment	Nintendo Switch	Yes	Yes	Yes	
2021	The House of the Dead: Remake	Light gun shooter	Megapixel Studio	Forever Entertainment	Microsoft Windows	Yes	Yes	Yes	
2021	Wonder Boy: Asha in Monster World	Platform, RPG	Artdink	ININ Studios	PlayStation 4	Yes	Yes	Yes	
2021	Wonder Boy: Asha in Monster World	Platform, RPG	Artdink	ININ Studios	Nintendo Switch	Yes	Yes	Yes	
2021	Wonder Boy: Asha in Monster World	Platform, RPG	Artdink	ININ Studios	Microsoft Windows	Yes	Yes	Yes	
2022	Bayonetta 3	Action	Platinum Games	Nintendo	Nintendo Switch	Yes	Yes	Yes	
2023	Battle of Three Kingdoms	Web 3, NFT, DCCG	doublejump.tokyo		Microsoft Windows	Yes	Yes	Yes	
2023	Bayonetta Origins: Cereza and the Lost Demon	Action	Platinum Games	Nintendo	Nintendo Switch	Yes	Yes		
2023	C-Smash VRS	Action, Sports	RapidEyeMovies	Wolf & Wood	PlayStation VR2		Yes	Yes	
2025	The House of the Dead 2: Remake	Light gun shooter	Megapixel Studio	Forever Entertainment	PlayStation 4	Yes	Yes	Yes	
2025	The House of the Dead 2: Remake	Light gun shooter	Megapixel Studio	Forever Entertainment	Xbox One	Yes	Yes	Yes	
2025	The House of the Dead 2: Remake	Light gun shooter	Megapixel Studio	Forever Entertainment	Xbox Series X	Yes	Yes	Yes	
2025	The House of the Dead 2: Remake	Light gun shooter	Megapixel Studio	Forever Entertainment	Nintendo Switch	Yes	Yes	Yes	
2025	The House of the Dead 2: Remake	Light gun shooter	Megapixel Studio	Forever Entertainment	Microsoft Windows	Yes	Yes	Yes	
2026	Panzer Dragoon Zwei Remake	Rail shooter	Megapixel Studio	Forever Entertainment	PlayStation 4	Yes	Yes	Yes	
2026	Panzer Dragoon Zwei Remake	Rail shooter	Megapixel Studio	Forever Entertainment	Xbox One	Yes	Yes	Yes	
2026	Panzer Dragoon Zwei Remake	Rail shooter	Megapixel Studio	Forever Entertainment	Xbox Series X	Yes	Yes	Yes	
2026	Panzer Dragoon Zwei Remake	Rail shooter	Megapixel Studio	Forever Entertainment	Nintendo Switch	Yes	Yes	Yes	
2026	Panzer Dragoon Zwei Remake	Rail shooter	Megapixel Studio	Forever Entertainment	Microsoft Windows	Yes	Yes	Yes	

== See also ==
- Lists of Sega games
- List of Sega arcade games
- List of Sega Master System games
- List of Sega Mega Drive and Sega Genesis games
- List of Game Gear games
- List of Sega Mega-CD games
- List of Sega 32X games
- List of Sega Saturn games
- List of Dreamcast games
