= List of Master System games =

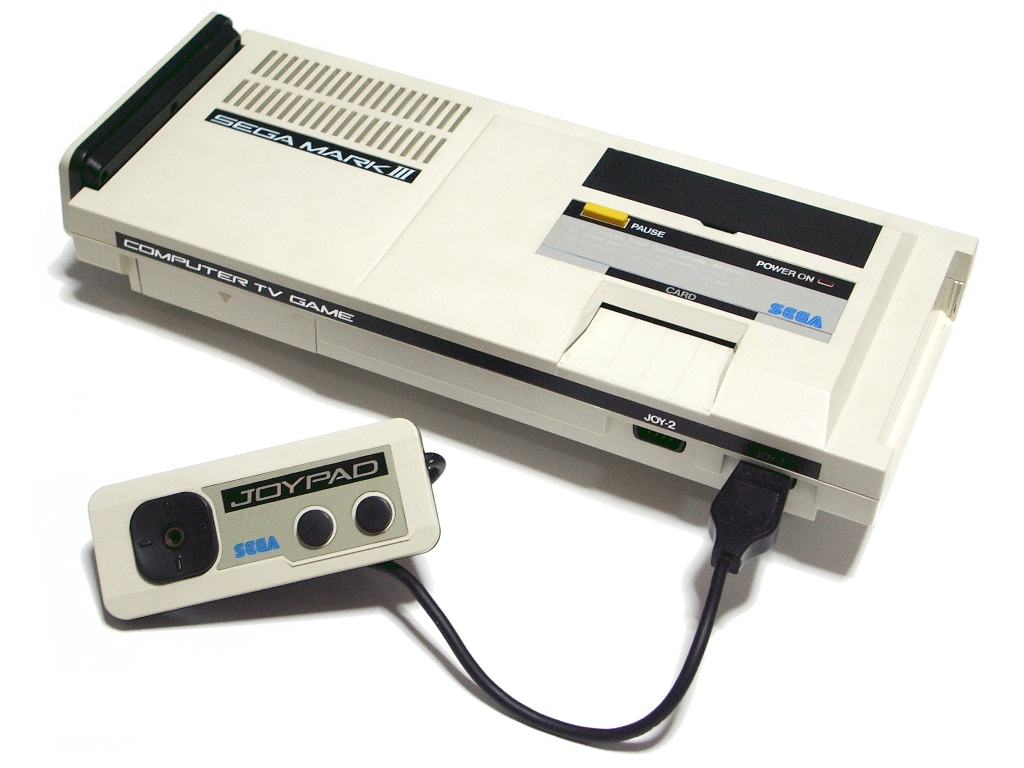
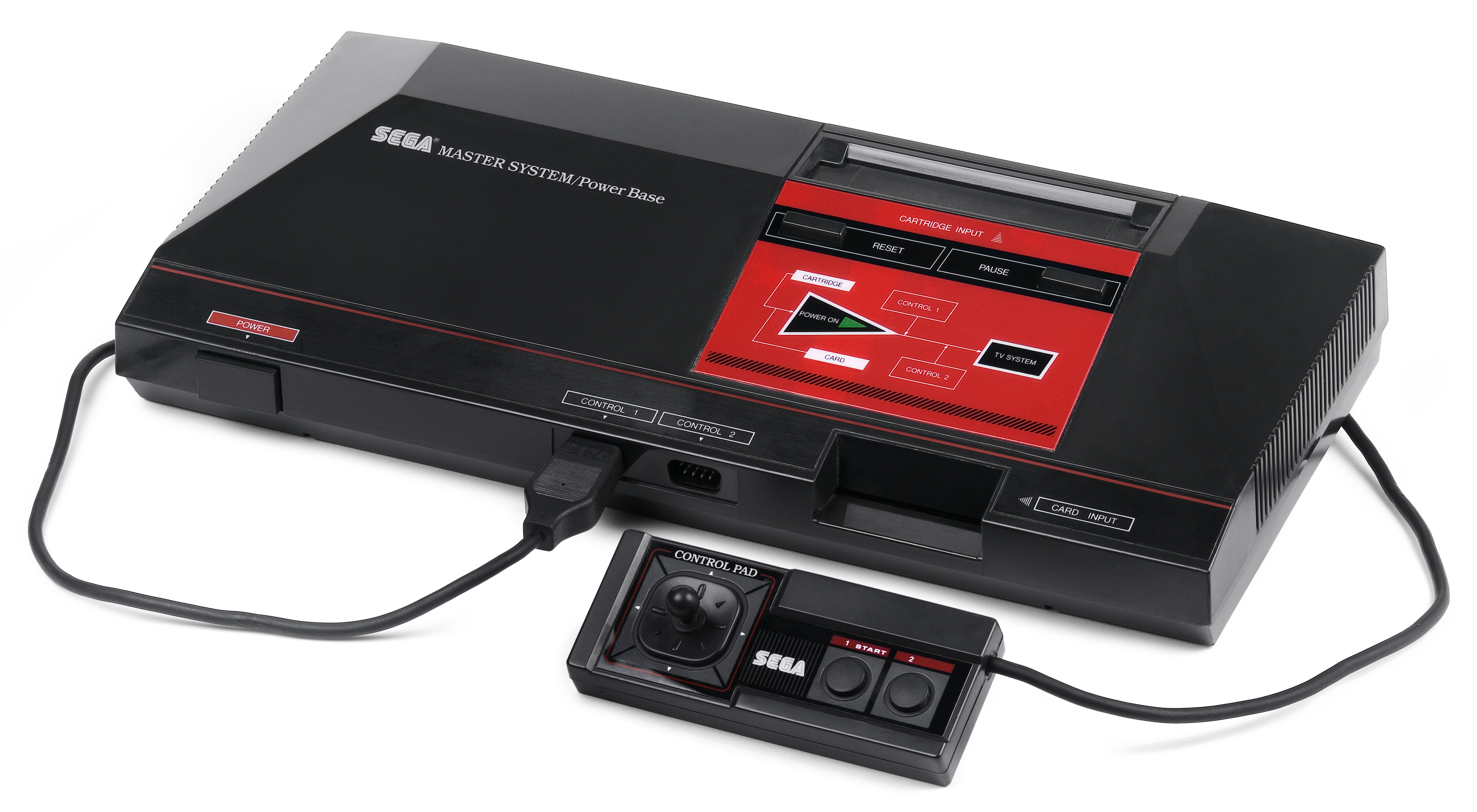
The Japanese Sega Mark III (top) and international Master System (bottom)

The Master System is a video game console released by Sega in North America in September 1986 to compete with the Nintendo Entertainment System, which had been released in the same market in February 1986, following an earlier test launch in New York in October 1985. The Master System was a renamed and redesigned version of the Sega Mark III, which had been released in Japan on October 20, 1985. The Master System was later released in Europe in August 1987, in South Korea in April 1989 and in Brazil in September 1989 where distribution rights were given to Tectoy. A re-release of the console in the Japanese market under the new Master System brand and redesign also occurred on October 18, 1987. Sega released a further streamlined redesign of the console a year after the launch of the Sega Genesis in 1990.

There are 314 (Note: This number is always up to date by this script.) game titles for the Master System. 18 were released exclusively in Japan, 4 were released exclusively in North America, 158 were released exclusively in PAL regions and 22 were released exclusively in Brazil.

== Games ==
Title(s)	Developer(s)	Publisher(s)	Release date			
Title(s)	Developer(s)	Publisher(s)	JP	NA	PAL	BR
20 em 1	Tec Toy	Tec Toy	Unreleased	Unreleased	Unreleased	1995
Ace of Aces	Tiertex	Sega	Unreleased	Unreleased	1991	
Action Fighter	Sega	Sega	August 17, 1986	November 1986	August 1987	
The Addams Family	Arc Developments	Flying Edge	Unreleased	Unreleased	December 1993	Unreleased
Aerial Assault	Sanritsu	Sega	Unreleased	July 1990	1990	
After Burner	Sega	Sega	December 12, 1987	March 1988	March 1988	
Air Rescue	SIMS	Sega	Unreleased	Unreleased	July 1992	
Aladdin	SIMS	Sega	Unreleased	Unreleased	March 30, 1994	
Alex Kidd BMX Trial	Sega	Sega	November 15, 1987	Unreleased	Unreleased	Unreleased
Alex Kidd: High-Tech World; Anmitsu Hime^{JP}	Sega	Sega^{WW} Tec Toy^{BR}	July 19, 1987	June 1989	1989	
Alex Kidd in Miracle World	Sega	Sega^{WW} Tec Toy^{BR}	November 1, 1986	December 1986	1987	
Alex Kidd in Shinobi World	Sega	Sega	Unreleased	1990	1990	
Alex Kidd: The Lost Stars	Whiteboard	Sega	March 10, 1988	July 1988	1988	
ALF	Nexa	Sega	Unreleased	May 1989	Unreleased	Unreleased
Alien 3	Probe Software	Arena Entertainment	Unreleased	Unreleased	October 21, 1992	
Alien Storm	SIMS	Sega	Unreleased	Unreleased	December 1991	
Alien Syndrome	Sanritsu	Sega	October 18, 1987	March 1988	March 1988	
Altered Beast	Sega	Sega	Unreleased	June 1989	June 1989	
Andre Agassi Tennis	TecMagik	TecMagik	Unreleased	Unreleased	June 1993	
Arcade Smash Hits	Images Software	Virgin Games	Unreleased	Unreleased	August 1992	Unreleased
Argos no Juujiken	Salio	Salio	March 25, 1988	Unreleased	Unreleased	Unreleased
Ariel the Little Mermaid	BlueSky Software	Tec Toy	Unreleased	Unreleased	Unreleased	1992
Assault City	Sanritsu	Sega	Unreleased	Unreleased	1990	
Asterix	Sega	Sega	Unreleased	Unreleased	March 1992	1992
Asterix and the Great Rescue	Core Design	Sega^{PAL} Tec Toy^{BR}	Unreleased	Unreleased	August 1994	1994
Asterix and the Secret Mission (Note: Three years after the initial Brazilian release, it was rereleased in Brazil without the Asterix license under the title As Aventuras da TV Colosso.)	Sega	Sega^{PAL} Tec Toy^{BR}	Unreleased	Unreleased	November 1993	1993
Astro Warrior (Note: Seven years later the initial Brazilian release, it was rereleased in Brazil as Sapo Xulé: S.O.S. Lagoa Poluida.)	Sega	Sega^{WW} Tec Toy^{BR}	December 14, 1986	December 1986	October 1987 (Note: Released exclusively as part of a pack-in game compilation with Pit Pot for that region)	1989
Ayrton Senna's Super Monaco GP II	Sega; Arc System Works	Sega^{PAL} Tec Toy^{BR}	Unreleased	Unreleased	June 1992	1992
Aztec Adventure; Nazca '88: The Golden Road to Paradise^{JP}	Sega	Sega	September 20, 1987	March 1988	October 1988	
Back to the Future Part II	Images Software	Image Works	Unreleased	Unreleased	November 11, 1991	1991
Back to the Future Part III	Probe Software	Image Works	Unreleased	Unreleased	June 24, 1992	Unreleased
Baku Baku	Sega	Tec Toy	Unreleased	Unreleased	Unreleased	1996
Bank Panic	Sega	Sega^{PAL} Tec Toy^{BR}	Unreleased	Unreleased	1987 (Note: Released as both a Sega Card and cartridge for that region)	1989
Basketball Nightmare	Aicom	Sega	Unreleased	Unreleased	December 1989	
Batman Returns	Aspect	Sega^{PAL} Tec Toy^{BR}	Unreleased	Unreleased	March 1993	1993
Battle Out Run	Sega; Arc System Works	Sega	Unreleased	Unreleased	1989	
Battletoads in Battlemaniacs	Syrox Developments	Tec Toy	Unreleased	Unreleased	Unreleased	1996
Black Belt; Hokuto no Ken^{JP}	Sega	Sega^{WW} Tec Toy^{BR}	July 20, 1986	November 1986	August 1987	1989
Blade Eagle 3-D	Sega	Sega	March 26, 1988	September 1988	1988	
Bomber Raid	Sanritsu	Sega^{WW} Activision^{NA}	February 4, 1989	January 1989	June 1989	Unreleased
Bonanza Bros.	Sanritsu	Sega	Unreleased	Unreleased	December 1991	
Bonkers: Wax Up!	Tec Toy	Tec Toy	Unreleased	Unreleased	Unreleased	1998
Bram Stoker's Dracula	Probe Software	Sony Imagesoft	Unreleased	Unreleased	November 19, 1993	Unreleased
Bubble Bobble; Final Bubble Bobble^{JP}	Taito	Sega	July 2, 1988	Unreleased	November 1991	
Buggy Run	SIMS	Sega	Unreleased	Unreleased	March 10, 1994	
California Games	Sega	Sega	Unreleased	May 1989	July 1989	
California Games II	Probe Software	Sega	Unreleased	Unreleased	August 1993	
Captain Silver	Sega	Sega	July 2, 1988	September 1989	1988	
Casino Games	Compile	Sega	Unreleased	September 1989	November 1989	Unreleased
Castelo Rá-Tim-Bum	Tec Toy	Tec Toy	Unreleased	Unreleased	Unreleased	1997
Castle of Illusion Starring Mickey Mouse	Sega	Sega	Unreleased	February 1991	February 1991	1991
Champions of Europe	TecMagik	TecMagik^{PAL} Tec Toy^{BR}	Unreleased	Unreleased	June 1, 1992	1992
Championship Hockey	Electronic Arts	U.S. Gold	Unreleased	Unreleased	May 1995	Unreleased
Chase H.Q.	Taito	Sega	Unreleased	Unreleased	1990	Unreleased
Cheese Cat-Astrophe Starring Speedy Gonzales	Cryo Interactive	Sega^{PAL} Tec Toy^{BR}	Unreleased	Unreleased	May 1995	1995
Choplifter	Sega	Sega	Unreleased	September 1986	August 1987	
Chuck Rock	Core Design	Virgin Games^{PAL} Tec Toy^{BR}	Unreleased	Unreleased	August 1992	1992
Chuck Rock II: Son of Chuck	Core Design	Core Design^{PAL} Tec Toy^{BR}	Unreleased	Unreleased	October 1993	1993
Cloud Master	Opera House	Sega	Unreleased	August 1989	1989	
Columns	Sega	Sega	Unreleased	September 1990	November 1990	
Comical Machine Gun Joe	Sega	Sega	April 21, 1986 (Note: Released as a Sega Card for that region)	Unreleased	Unreleased	Unreleased
Cool Spot	Virgin Interactive Entertainment	Virgin Interactive Entertainment	Unreleased	Unreleased	October 1993	Unreleased
Cosmic Spacehead	Codemasters	Codemasters	Unreleased	Unreleased	November 1993	Unreleased
The Cyber Shinobi	Sega	Sega	Unreleased	Unreleased	April 1991	
Cyborg Hunter; Chōon Senshi Borgman^{JP}	Sega	Sega^{WW} Activision^{NA}	December 1, 1988	January 1989	July 1989	
Daffy Duck in Hollywood	Probe Software	Sega	Unreleased	Unreleased	December 1994	
Danan: The Jungle Fighter	Whiteboard	Sega	Unreleased	Unreleased	January 1991	
Dead Angle	Sega	Sega	Unreleased	November 1989	January 1990	
Deep Duck Trouble Starring Donald Duck	Aspect	Sega	Unreleased	Unreleased	January 1994	
Desert Speedtrap Starring Road Runner & Wile E. Coyote	Probe Software	Sega	Unreleased	Unreleased	1993	
Desert Strike	The Kremlin	Domark	Unreleased	Unreleased	November 1993	Unreleased
Dick Tracy	BlueSky Software	Sega	Unreleased	February 1991	April 1991	
Double Dragon	Sega; Arc System Works	Sega	October 1, 1988	November 1988	1988	
Double Hawk	Opera House	Sega	Unreleased	Unreleased	1990	Unreleased
Dr. Robotnik's Mean Bean Machine	Compile	Sega	Unreleased	Unreleased	March 1994	
Dragon: The Bruce Lee Story	Virgin Interactive Entertainment	Virgin Interactive Entertainment	Unreleased	Unreleased	February 20, 1995	Unreleased
Dragon Crystal	Sega	Sega	Unreleased	Unreleased	November 21, 1991	
Dynamite Duke	Sanritsu	Sega	Unreleased	Unreleased	April 1991	
Dynamite Düx	Whiteboard	Sega	Unreleased	Unreleased	January 1990	
Dynamite Headdy	Minato Giken	Tec Toy	Unreleased	Unreleased	Unreleased	1995
E-SWAT	Sanritsu	Sega	Unreleased	September 1990	November 1990	
Earthworm Jim	Eurocom	Tec Toy	Unreleased	Unreleased	Unreleased	1996
Ecco the Dolphin	Novotrade	Sega	Unreleased	Unreleased	August 24, 1994	
Ecco: The Tides of Time	Novotrade	Tec Toy	Unreleased	Unreleased	Unreleased	1996
Enduro Racer	Sega	Sega	May 18, 1987	August 1987	November 1987	
F1	Teque London	Domark^{PAL} Tec Toy^{BR}	Unreleased	Unreleased	October 1993	1993
F-16 Fighting Falcon	Sega	Sega	December 22, 1985	October 1986	October 1987	
Fantastic Dizzy	Codemasters	Codemasters	Unreleased	Unreleased	October 1993	Unreleased
Fantasy Zone	Sega	Sega	June 15, 1986	September 1986	August 1987	Unreleased
Fantasy Zone II: The Tears of Opa-Opa	Sega	Sega	October 17, 1987	December 1987	January 1988	
Fantasy Zone: The Maze; Opa Opa^{JP}	Whiteboard	Sega	December 20, 1987	July 1988	1988	
Férias Frustradas do Pica-Pau	Tec Toy	Tec Toy	Unreleased	Unreleased	Unreleased	1996
FIFA International Soccer	Tec Toy	Tec Toy	Unreleased	Unreleased	Unreleased	October 12, 1996
Fire & Forget II	Titus	Titus	Unreleased	Unreleased	November 1990	Unreleased
Fire and Ice	Graftgold	Tec Toy	Unreleased	Unreleased	Unreleased	1996
The Flash	Probe Software	Sega	Unreleased	Unreleased	August 1993	
The Flintstones	Tiertex	Grandslam Video	Unreleased	Unreleased	January 1992	
Forgotten Worlds	Sanritsu	Sega	Unreleased	Unreleased	July 1991	1991
G-LOC: Air Battle	Sanritsu	Sega	Unreleased	Unreleased	January 1992	
Gain Ground	Sanritsu	Sega	Unreleased	Unreleased	January 1991	
Galactic Protector	Sega	Sega	February 21, 1988	Unreleased	Unreleased	Unreleased
Galaxy Force	Sega	Activision^{NA} Sega^{PAL}	Unreleased	October 1989	1989	
Gangster Town	Sega	Sega	Unreleased	August 1987	1987	
Gauntlet	Tiertex	U.S. Gold	Unreleased	Unreleased	November 1990	
George Foreman's KO Boxing	SIMS	Flying Edge^{PAL} Tec Toy^{BR}	Unreleased	Unreleased	1992	1993
Ghostbusters	Compile	Sega	Unreleased	May 1987	October 1989	
Ghost House (Note: Two years after the initial Brazilian release, it was rereleased in Brazil as Chapolim x Drácula: Um duelo assustador)	Sega	Sega^{WW} Tec Toy^{BR}	April 21, 1986	September 1986	August 1987	1991
Ghouls 'n Ghosts	Sega; Arc System Works	Sega^{NA/PAL} Tec Toy^{BR}	Unreleased	January 1991	April 1991	1991
Global Defense; SDI^{JP}	Sega	Sega	October 24, 1987	March 1988	March 1988	
Global Gladiators	Virgin Games; Graftgold	Virgin Games	Unreleased	Unreleased	April 1993	
Golden Axe	Sega	Sega	Unreleased	1990	1990	
Golden Axe Warrior	Sega	Sega	Unreleased	April 1991	May 1991	
Golfamania	Sanritsu	Sega	Unreleased	Unreleased	1990	
Golvellius: Valley of Doom; Maô Golvellius^{JP}	Compile	Sega	August 14, 1988	December 1988	1988	
GP Rider	Sega	Sega	Unreleased	Unreleased	1993	
Great Baseball (JP)	Sega	Sega	December 15, 1985	Unreleased	Unreleased	Unreleased
Great Baseball; The Pro Yakyū: Pennant Race^{JP}	Sega	Sega	August 17, 1987	March 1987	September 1988	Unreleased
Great Basketball	Sega	Sega	March 29, 1987	December 1987	1987	
Great Football	Sega	Sega	April 29, 1987	July 1987	September 1988	Unreleased
Great Golf (JP)	Sega	Sega	December 20, 1986	Unreleased	Unreleased	Unreleased
Great Golf; Masters Golf^{JP}	Whiteboard	Sega	October 10, 1987	November 1987	November 1987	Unreleased
Great Ice Hockey	Sega	Sega	1987 (Note: Released exclusively as a competition prize for Beep! magazine)	December 1986	Unreleased	Unreleased
Great Soccer	Sega	Sega	October 27, 1985	Unreleased	1987	Unreleased
Great Volleyball	Sega	Sega	March 29, 1987	August 1987	1987	
Hang-On	Sega	Sega	October 20, 1985	September 1986 (Note: Released exclusively as part of a pack-in game compilation with Safari Hunt for that region)	August 1987 (Note: Released as a pack-in game on a Sega Card, although it would not come out as a cartridge until 1990.)	Unreleased
Heroes of the Lance	Tiertex	U.S. Gold	Unreleased	Unreleased	December 1991	
High School! Kimengumi	Sega	Sega	December 15, 1986	Unreleased	Unreleased	Unreleased
Home Alone	Probe Software	Sega	Unreleased	Unreleased	June 7, 1993	Unreleased
Hoshi wo Sagashite...	Sega	Sega	April 2, 1988	Unreleased	Unreleased	Unreleased
Impossible Mission	Epyx	U.S. Gold	Unreleased	Unreleased	November 1990	
The Incredible Crash Dummies	Teeny Weeny Games	Flying Edge	Unreleased	Unreleased	May 1993	
The Incredible Hulk	Probe Software	U.S. Gold	Unreleased	Unreleased	July 22, 1994	
Indiana Jones and the Last Crusade: The Action Game	Tiertex	U.S. Gold	Unreleased	Unreleased	November 1990	
James Bond 007: The Duel	The Kremlin	Domark	Unreleased	Unreleased	April 1993	
James 'Buster' Douglas Knockout Boxing; Heavyweight Champ^{PAL}	Sanritsu	Sega	Unreleased	1990	May 1991	
James Pond 2: Codename RoboCod	Tiertex	U.S. Gold	Unreleased	Unreleased	August 1993	
Joe Montana Football	BlueSky Software	Sega	Unreleased	December 1990	1990	
The Jungle Book	Syrox Developments	Virgin Interactive Entertainment	Unreleased	Unreleased	December 1993	
Jurassic Park	Sega	Sega	Unreleased	Unreleased	November 1993	
Kenseiden	Sega	Sega	June 2, 1988	October 1988	November 1988	
King's Quest: Quest for the Crown	Microsmiths	Parker Brothers	Unreleased	July 1989	Unreleased	Unreleased
Klax	Tengen	Tengen	Unreleased	Unreleased	November 1991	Unreleased
Krusty's Fun House	Audiogenic	Flying Edge	Unreleased	Unreleased	May 1993	
Kung Fu Kid (Note: Three years after the initial Brazilian release, it was rereleased in Brazil as Sapo Xulé O Mestre do Kung Fu); Makai Retsuden^{JP}	Sega	Sega^{WW} Tec Toy^{BR}	May 17, 1987	October 1987	January 1988	1992
Land of Illusion Starring Mickey Mouse	Sega	Sega^{PAL} Tec Toy^{BR}	Unreleased	Unreleased	April 1993	1994
Laser Ghost	Sega	Sega	Unreleased	Unreleased	December 19, 1991	Unreleased
Legend of Illusion Starring Mickey Mouse	Aspect	Tec Toy	Unreleased	Unreleased	Unreleased	December 1998
Lemmings	Probe Software	Sega	Unreleased	Unreleased	November 24, 1992	
Line of Fire	Sanritsu	Sega	Unreleased	Unreleased	December 19, 1991	
The Lion King	Syrox Developments	Virgin Interactive Entertainment	Unreleased	Unreleased	November 4, 1994	
Lord of the Sword	Sega	Sega	June 2, 1988	March 1989	1988	
The Lucky Dime Caper Starring Donald Duck	Sega	Sega	Unreleased	Unreleased	1991	
Mahjong Sengoku Jidai	Sanritsu	Sega	October 18, 1987	Unreleased	Unreleased	Unreleased
Marble Madness	Steve Lamb	Virgin Games	Unreleased	Unreleased	August 1992	Unreleased
Marksman Shooting & Trap Shooting	Sega	Sega	Unreleased	December 1986	August 1987 (Note: Released exclusively as part of a compilation with Safari Hunt for that region)	
Master of Darkness	SIMS	Sega	Unreleased	Unreleased	1992	
Masters of Combat	SIMS	Sega	Unreleased	Unreleased	March 10, 1994	
Maze Hunter 3D; Maze Walker^{JP}	Sega	Sega	January 31, 1988	May 1988	1988	
Megumi Rescue	Whiteboard	Sega	July 30, 1988	Unreleased	Unreleased	Unreleased
Mercs	Tiertex	Sega	Unreleased	Unreleased	January 1992	
Michael Jackson's Moonwalker	Sega; Arc System Works	Sega^{PAL/NA} Tec Toy^{BR}	Unreleased	May 1991	February 1991	1991
Mickey's Ultimate Challenge	Designer Software	Tec Toy	Unreleased	Unreleased	Unreleased	1998
Micro Machines	Codemasters	Codemasters	Unreleased	Unreleased	March 10, 1994	Unreleased
Miracle Warriors: Seal of the Dark Lord; Haja no Fūin^{JP}	Sega	Sega	October 18, 1987	October 1988	November 1988	
Missile Defense 3-D	Sega	Sega	Unreleased	August 1987	October 1987	
Monopoly	Nexa	Sega	Unreleased	September 1988	October 1988	Unreleased
Montezuma's Revenge	Parker Brothers	Parker Brothers	Unreleased	June 1989	Unreleased	Unreleased
Mortal Kombat	Probe Software	Arena Entertainment	Unreleased	Unreleased	September 13, 1993	
Mortal Kombat II	Probe Software	Acclaim Entertainment	Unreleased	Unreleased	November 1994	
Mortal Kombat 3	Software Creations	Tec Toy	Unreleased	Unreleased	Unreleased	1996
Ms. Pac-Man	Tengen	Tengen	Unreleased	Unreleased	1991	
My Hero; Seishun Scandal^{JP}	Sega	Sega	January 31, 1986	September 1986	August 1987	
Nekkyuu Koushien	Whiteboard	Sega	September 9, 1988	Unreleased	Unreleased	Unreleased
The NewZealand Story	TecMagik	TecMagik	Unreleased	Unreleased	November 12, 1992	Unreleased
The Ninja	Sega	Sega	November 8, 1986	December 1986	November 1987	
Ninja Gaiden	SIMS	Sega	Unreleased	Unreleased	July 16, 1992	
Olympic Gold	Tiertex	U.S. Gold	Unreleased	Unreleased	June 1992	
Operation Wolf	Taito	Sega^{PAL} Tec Toy^{BR}	Unreleased	Unreleased	1990	1991
The Ottifants	Graftgold	Sega	Unreleased	Unreleased	1993	
Out Run	Sega	Sega	June 30, 1987	October 1987	October 1987	
OutRun 3-D	Sega	Sega	Unreleased	Unreleased	June 1989	
Out Run Europa	Probe Software	U.S. Gold	Unreleased	Unreleased	January 1992	
Pac-Mania	TecMagik	TecMagik	Unreleased	Unreleased	July 1991	Unreleased
Paperboy	Tiertex	Sega^{NA} U.S. Gold^{PAL}	Unreleased	1990	November 1990	
Parlour Games; Family Games^{JP}	Compile	Sega	December 27, 1987	May 1988	1990	Unreleased
Penguin Land; Doki Doki Penguin Land Uchū Daibōken^{JP}	Sega	Sega	August 18, 1987	January 1988	October 1988	Unreleased
PGA Tour Golf	Polygames	Tengen	Unreleased	Unreleased	November 1993	Unreleased
Phantasy Star	Sega	Sega^{WW} Tec Toy^{BR}	December 20, 1987	November 1988	November 1988	1991
Pit-Fighter	The Kremlin	Domark	Unreleased	Unreleased	December 1992	
Pit Pot; Fushigi no Oshiro Pit Pot^{JP}	Sega	Sega	December 14, 1985	Unreleased	October 1987	Unreleased
Populous	Code To Go	TecMagik	Unreleased	Unreleased	October 1991	
Poseidon Wars 3-D	Sega	Sega	Unreleased	March 1989	1989	
Power Strike; Aleste^{JP}	Compile	Sega	February 29, 1988	December 1988	1988	
Power Strike II	Compile	Sega	Unreleased	Unreleased	September 1993	
Predator 2	Teeny Weeny Games	Arena Entertainment	Unreleased	Unreleased	January 1993	
Prince of Persia	The Kremlin	Domark	Unreleased	Unreleased	October 1, 1992	
Pro Wrestling; Gokuaku Doumei Dump Matsumoto^{JP}	Sega	Sega	July 20, 1986	December 1986	August 1987	
Psychic World	Sanritsu	Sega	Unreleased	Unreleased	June 1991	
Psycho Fox (Note: Three years after the initial Brazilian release, it was rereleased in Brazil as Sapo Xulé: Os Invasores do Brejo)	Vic Tokai	Sega^{PAL/NA} Tec Toy^{BR}	Unreleased	May 1990	December 1989	1992
Putt & Putter	SIMS	Sega	Unreleased	Unreleased	June 1992	
Quartet; Double Target: Cynthia no Nemuri^{JP}	Sega	Sega	January 18, 1987	April 1987	1987	Unreleased
The Quest for the Shaven Yak Starring Ren Hoëk & Stimpy	Realtime Associates	Tec Toy	Unreleased	Unreleased	Unreleased	1995
R-Type	Compile	Sega	October 1, 1988	December 1988	1989	
R.C. Grand Prix	Imagineering	Seismic Software^{NA} Sega^{PAL}	Unreleased	June 1990	1990	
Rainbow Islands	I.T.L	Sega	Unreleased	Unreleased	1993	
Rambo: First Blood Part II; Ashura^{JP} Secret Command^{PAL}	Sega	Sega	November 16, 1986	December 1986	October 1987	Unreleased
Rambo III	Sega	Sega	Unreleased	December 1988	1989	
Rampage	Sega	Activision^{NA} Sega^{PAL}	Unreleased	January 1989	June 1989	
Rampart	Developer Resources	Tengen	Unreleased	Unreleased	December 3, 1992	Unreleased
Rastan	Taito	Sega	Unreleased	April 1989	June 1989	
Reggie Jackson Baseball; American Baseball^{PAL}	Whiteboard	Sega	Unreleased	March 1989	August 1989	
Renegade	Natsume	Sega	Unreleased	Unreleased	July 1993	
Rescue Mission	Sega	Sega	Unreleased	April 1988	March 1988	
Road Rash	Probe Software	U.S. Gold	Unreleased	Unreleased	March 10, 1994	
RoboCop 3	Eden Entertainment Software	Flying Edge	Unreleased	Unreleased	November 1993	
RoboCop Versus The Terminator	NMS Software	Virgin Interactive Entertainment	Unreleased	Unreleased	December 1993	
Rocky	Sega	Sega	April 19, 1987	July 1987	August 1987	
Running Battle	Opera House	Sega	Unreleased	Unreleased	October 1991	
Safari Hunt	Sega	Sega	Unreleased	September 1986 (Note: Released exclusively as part of a pack-in game compilation with Hang-On for that region)	August 1987 (Note: Released exclusively as part of a compilation with the games Marksman Shooting and Trap Shooting for that region)	Unreleased
Sagaia	Natsume	Sega^{PAL} Tec Toy^{BR}	Unreleased	Unreleased	1992	1992
Satellite 7	Sega	Sega	December 20, 1985	Unreleased	Unreleased	Unreleased
Scramble Spirits	Sega; Arc System Works	Sega	Unreleased	Unreleased	1989	
Sega Chess	Probe Software	Sega	Unreleased	Unreleased	November 14, 1991	
Sega World Tournament Golf	Sega	Sega	Unreleased	Unreleased	July 1993	
Sensible Soccer	Eurocom	Sony Imagesoft	Unreleased	Unreleased	February 11, 1994	Unreleased
Shadow Dancer	Sega	Sega^{PAL} Tec Toy^{BR}	Unreleased	Unreleased	January 1992	1991
Shadow of the Beast	TecMagik	TecMagik	Unreleased	Unreleased	February 1992	
Shanghai	Sega	Sega	Unreleased	October 1988	November 1988	Unreleased
Shinobi	Sega	Sega	June 19, 1988	September 1988	November 1988	
Shooting Gallery	Sega	Sega	Unreleased	March 1987	August 1987	
The Simpsons: Bart vs. the Space Mutants	Arc Developments	Flying Edge	Unreleased	Unreleased	September 1992	
The Simpsons: Bart vs. the World	Arc Developments	Flying Edge	Unreleased	Unreleased	December 1993	
Sítio do Picapau Amarelo	Tec Toy	Tec Toy	Unreleased	Unreleased	Unreleased	1997
Slap Shot	Sanritsu	Sega	Unreleased	1990	1990	
The Smurfs	Bit Managers	Infogrames^{PAL} Tec Toy^{BR}	Unreleased	Unreleased	January 27, 1995	1995
The Smurfs Travel the World	Virtual Studio	Infogrames	Unreleased	Unreleased	1996	Unreleased
Snail Maze (Note: Hidden game that can be accessed on the original model Master System outside of Japan. It can be accessed by holding "Up", "1", and "2" buttons when the Sega logo appears, if there is no cartridge inserted.)	Sega	Sega	Unreleased	September 1986	August 1987	September 1989
Solomon no Kagi: Oujo Rihita no Namida	Aisystem Tokyo	Salio	April 17, 1988	Unreleased	Unreleased	Unreleased
Sonic Blast	Aspect	Tec Toy	Unreleased	Unreleased	Unreleased	December 1997
Sonic the Hedgehog	Ancient	Sega	Unreleased	November 1991	November 8, 1991	
Sonic the Hedgehog 2	Sega; Aspect	Sega	Unreleased	Unreleased	November 24, 1992	
Sonic the Hedgehog Chaos	Aspect	Sega^{PAL} Tec Toy^{BR}	Unreleased	Unreleased	November 23, 1993	November 23, 1993
Sonic the Hedgehog Spinball	Sega Interactive Development Division	Sega^{PAL} Tec Toy^{BR}	Unreleased	Unreleased	January 27, 1995	1995
Space Gun	Cream	Sega	Unreleased	Unreleased	November 19, 1992	Unreleased
Space Harrier	Sega	Sega	December 21, 1986	March 1987	August 1987	Unreleased
Space Harrier 3-D	Sega	Sega	February 29, 1988	July 1988	1988	
Special Criminal Investigation	Natsume	Sega	Unreleased	Unreleased	October 15, 1992	Unreleased
Speedball	The Bitmap Brothers	Image Works	Unreleased	Unreleased	March 1991	Unreleased
Speedball 2	The Bitmap Brothers	Virgin Games	Unreleased	Unreleased	October 29, 1992	Unreleased
SpellCaster; Kujaku Ō^{JP}	Sega	Sega	September 23, 1988	September 1989	1989	
Spider-Man: Return of the Sinister Six	Bits Studios	Flying Edge	Unreleased	Unreleased	1993	
Spider-Man vs. The Kingpin	Sega	Sega	Unreleased	August 1991	October 1991	
Spy vs. Spy	Sega	Sega	September 20, 1986	October 1988	August 1987	
Star Wars	Tiertex	U.S. Gold	Unreleased	Unreleased	October 1993	
Street Fighter II′	Tec Toy	Tec Toy	Unreleased	Unreleased	Unreleased	1997
Streets of Rage	Sega	Sega	Unreleased	Unreleased	June 7, 1993	
Streets of Rage II	Japan System House	Sega	Unreleased	Unreleased	February 1994	
Strider	Tiertex	Sega	Unreleased	June 1991	September 1991	1991
Strider II	Tiertex	U.S. Gold	Unreleased	Unreleased	April 1993	
Submarine Attack	Sega	Sega	Unreleased	Unreleased	1990	
Sukeban Deka II: Shōjo Tekkamen Densetsu	Sega	Sega	April 19, 1987	Unreleased	Unreleased	Unreleased
Summer Games	Zap Corporation	Sega	Unreleased	Unreleased	1991	1991
Super Kick Off	Tiertex	U.S. Gold	Unreleased	Unreleased	December 1991	
Superman: The Man of Steel	Graftgold	Virgin Games	Unreleased	Unreleased	June 1993	
Super Monaco GP	Sega; Arc System Works	Sega	Unreleased	September 1990	1990	
Super Off Road	Graftgold	Virgin Games	Unreleased	Unreleased	September 1993	Unreleased
Super Racing	Sega	Sega	July 2, 1988	Unreleased	Unreleased	Unreleased
Super Smash TV	Probe Software	Flying Edge	Unreleased	Unreleased	November 5, 1992	Unreleased
Super Space Invaders	The Kremlin	Domark	Unreleased	Unreleased	June 24, 1992	Unreleased
Super Tennis; Great Tennis^{JP}	Sega	Sega	December 22, 1985	December 1986	August 1987	Unreleased
T2: The Arcade Game	Probe Software	Arena Entertainment	Unreleased	Unreleased	1993	Unreleased
Taz in Escape from Mars	Tec Toy	Tec Toy	Unreleased	Unreleased	Unreleased	1997
Taz-Mania	Technical Wave	Sega	Unreleased	Unreleased	December 10, 1992	
Tecmo World Cup '93	SIMS	Sega	Unreleased	Unreleased	April 1993	Unreleased
Teddy Boy (Note: Four years after the initial Brazilian release, it was rereleased in Brazil as Geraldinho.); Teddy Boy Blues^{JP}	Sega	Sega^{WW} Tec Toy^{BR}	October 20, 1985	September 1986	November 1987	1991
Tennis Ace	Sanritsu	Sega	Unreleased	Unreleased	1989	
Tensai Bakabon	Sega	Sega	June 2, 1988	Unreleased	Unreleased	Unreleased
The Terminator	Probe Software	Virgin Games	Unreleased	Unreleased	August 1992	
Terminator 2: Judgment Day	Arc Developments	Flying Edge	Unreleased	Unreleased	November 1993	Unreleased
Thunder Blade	Sega	Sega	July 30, 1988	October 1988	November 1988	
Time Soldiers	Alpha Denshi	Sega	Unreleased	May 1989	July 1989	
Tom and Jerry: The Movie	SIMS	Sega^{PAL} Tec Toy^{BR}	Unreleased	Unreleased	October 1, 1992	1992
TransBot; Astro Flash^{JP}	Sega	Sega	December 22, 1985	October 1986	August 1987	
Trivial Pursuit: Genus Edition	Teque London	Domark	Unreleased	Unreleased	October 15, 1992	Unreleased
Ultima IV: Quest of the Avatar	Sega	Sega	Unreleased	Unreleased	1990	
Ultimate Soccer	Rage Software	Sega	Unreleased	Unreleased	August 1993	
Vigilante	Sega; Arc System Works	Sega	Unreleased	May 1989	July 1989	
Virtua Fighter Animation	Aspect	Tec Toy	Unreleased	Unreleased	Unreleased	December 1997
Walter Payton Football; American Pro Football^{PAL}	Sega	Sega	Unreleased	September 1989	1989	Unreleased
Wanted	Sanritsu	Sega	Unreleased	August 1989	November 1989	
Where in the World Is Carmen Sandiego?	Venture Technologies	Parker Brothers^{NA} Tec Toy^{BR}	Unreleased	December 1988	Unreleased	1994
Wimbledon	SIMS	Sega	Unreleased	Unreleased	May 1992	
Wimbledon II	SIMS	Sega	Unreleased	Unreleased	1993	Unreleased
Winter Olympics	Tiertex	U.S. Gold	Unreleased	Unreleased	1993	
Wolfchild	Core Design	Virgin Games	Unreleased	Unreleased	September 1993	
Wonder Boy; Super Wonder Boy^{JP}	Sega	Sega	March 22, 1987	June 1987	1987	
Wonder Boy in Monster Land (Note: Brazil received a retooled version of Wonder Boy in Monster Land as Mônica no Castelo do Dragão); Super Wonder Boy: Monster World^{JP}	Sega	Sega^{WW} Tec Toy^{BR}	January 31, 1988	August 1988	1988	1991
Wonder Boy III: The Dragon's Trap (Note: Brazil received a retooled version of Wonder Boy III: The Dragon's Trap as Turma da Mônica em o Resgate)	Westone	Sega^{NA/PAL} Tec Toy^{BR}	Unreleased	September 1989	1989	1993
Wonder Boy in Monster World	Shimada Kikaku	Sega	Unreleased	Unreleased	August 1993	Unreleased
Woody Pop: Shinjinrui no Block Kuzushi	Sega	Sega	March 15, 1987	Unreleased	Unreleased	Unreleased
World Class Leader Board	Tiertex	U.S. Gold	Unreleased	Unreleased	October 1991	
World Cup Italia '90	Sega	Sega	Unreleased	Unreleased	December 1990	
World Cup USA '94	Tiertex	U.S. Gold	Unreleased	Unreleased	June 3, 1994	
World Games	Sega	Sega	Unreleased	Unreleased	1990	
World Grand Prix; The Circuit^{JP}	Sega	Sega	September 21, 1986	October 1986	November 1987	
World Soccer (Note: A year after the initial Japanese release, it was rereleased in Japan as Sports Pad Soccer and came bundled with the Sega Sports Pad); Great Soccer^{NA} (Note: Unrelated to the previously listed entry that was exclusive to Japan and PAL regions also called Great Soccer)	Sega	Sega	July 19, 1987	October 1987	November 1987	
WWF WrestleMania: Steel Cage Challenge	Teeny Weeny Games	Flying Edge^{PAL} Tec Toy^{BR}	Unreleased	Unreleased	July 1993	1993
X-Men: Mojo World	Sega	Tec Toy	Unreleased	Unreleased	Unreleased	1996
Xenon 2: Megablast	Data Design Interactive	Image Works	Unreleased	Unreleased	November 21, 1991	Unreleased
Ys: The Vanished Omens	Sega	Sega	October 15, 1988	March 1989	1989	
Zaxxon 3-D	Sega	Sega	November 7, 1987	March 1988	November 1987	
Zillion; Akai Koudan Zillion^{JP}	Sega	Sega	May 24, 1987	November 1987	October 1987	
Zillion II: The Tri Formation; Tri Formation^{JP}	Sega	Sega	December 13, 1987	July 1988	August 1988	
Zool	Gremlin Graphics	Gremlin Graphics	Unreleased	Unreleased	March 1994	Unreleased

== Compilations ==
Title	Developer	Publisher	Release date			Game(s) included
Title	Developer	Publisher	NA	PAL	BR	Game(s) included
Astro Warrior / Pit Pot	Sega	Sega	Unreleased	October 1987	Unreleased	Astro Warrior and Pit Pot
Game Box Série Corridas	Sega	Tec Toy	Unreleased	Unreleased	1994	Super Cross, Super Monaco GP, and World Grand Prix
Game Box Série Esportes	Sega	Tec Toy	Unreleased	Unreleased	1996	Great Volley, Super Futebol II, and Wimbledon
Game Box Série Esportes Radicais	Sega	Tec Toy	Unreleased	Unreleased	1996	California Games (surfing and BMX events only)
Game Box Série Lutas	Sega	Tec Toy	Unreleased	Unreleased	1994	Shinobi, The Ninja, and Kung Fu Kid
Hang-On & Astro Warrior	Sega	Sega	September 1986	Unreleased	Unreleased	Hang-On and Astro Warrior
Hang-On & Safari Hunt	Sega	Sega	September 1986	Unreleased	Unreleased	Hang-On and Safari Hunt
Marksman Shooting / Trap Shooting / Safari Hunt	Sega	Sega	Unreleased	1987	Unreleased	Marksman Shooting, Trap Shooting, and Safari Hunt
Master Games 1	Sega	Sega	Unreleased	1993	Unreleased	Columns, Super Monaco GP, and World Soccer

== See also ==
- List of cancelled Master System games
