= List of TecToy Master System 131 games =

This is a list of the built-in games included with the Tec Toy Master System Collection 131 video game system released in Brazil in 2011. The collection contains both video games that were previously released for the Master System as well as new titles produced specifically for the system.

Most of the re-releases emulate their original European version. However, Tec Toy has chosen the video game Double Target that was released in Japan over its equivalent Quartet in the United States/Europe. Alex Kidd BMX Trial and Galactic Protector are the only two games on the compilation that were released exclusively in Japan. Another game, Sonic Drift 2, was never released at all on the Master System but rather on its derivative the Game Gear handheld console.

See List of Master System games for related games and lists.

Title	Developer	Publisher	Release Date

== 0-9 ==
20 em 1 (only released in Brazil)	Tec Toy	Tec Toy

== A ==
Ace of Aces	Artech Digital Entertainment	Sega
Action Fighter	Sega	Sega
Aerial Assault	Sega	Sega
Alex Kidd: The Lost Stars	Megasoft	Sega
Alex Kidd BMX Trial	Sega	Sega
Alex Kidd in High-Tech World	Sega	Sega
Alex Kidd in Miracle World	Sega	Sega
Alex Kidd in Shinobi World	Sega	Sega
Alien Syndrome	Sanritsu	Sega
Aquaduto	-	-
Arqueiro	-	-
Ataque dos Vermes	-	-
Aventuras na Floresta	-	-
Aztec Adventure: The Golden Road to Paradise	Sega	Sega

== B ==
Back to the Future II	Mirrorsoft	ImageWorks
Baku Baku Animal	SIMS/ Minato Giken	Sega
Bank Panic	Sega	Sega
Batalha no Mar	-	-
Battle Out Run	Sega/Arc System Works	Sega
Black Belt	Sega	Sega
Bolas e Cores	-	-
Bolhas	-	-
Bombeiros	-	-
Bomber Raid	Sanritsu	Sega
Bonanza Bros.	Sega	Sega
Bubble Bobble	Taito	Sega

== C ==
Cava Cava	-	-
Chase HQ	Taito	Sega
Columns	Sega	Sega
Creature Capture	-	-
Cyber Shinobi, The	Sega	Sega

== D ==
Domine o Territorio	-	-
Domino	-	-
Double Target	Sega	Sega
Dr. Limpeza	-	-
Dragon Crystal	Sega	Sega

== E ==
Enduro Racer	Sega	Sega
ESWAT: City Under Siege	Sanritsu/Sega	Sega

== F ==
Fabrica de Chocolate	-	-
Fantasy Zone	Sega	Sega
Fantasy Zone II: The Tears of Opa-Opa	Sega	Sega
Fantasy Zone: The Maze	Sega	Sega

== G ==
Gain Ground	SIMS	Sega
Galactic Protector	Sega	Sega
Ghost House	Sega	Sega
Ghost Defense	-	-
G-LOC: Air Battle	SIMS	Sega
Golden Axe	Sega	Sega
Golfamania	Sanritsu	Sega
Great Soccer	Sega	Sega

== H ==
Hang-On	Sega	Sega
Hexagonas	-	-
Hockey de Mesa	-	-

== I ==
Icepost Rescue	-	-

== J ==
Junte 4	-	-

== K ==
Kenseiden	Sega	Sega
Kung Fu Kid	Sega	Sega

== L ==
Lord of the Sword	Sega	Sega

== M ==
Machinegun Joe	Sega	Sega
Master Pinball	-	-
Master Pong	-	-
Maze Walker	Sega	Sega
Memoria Master	-	-
Mina Terrestre	-	-
Minerador	-	-
My Hero	Sega	Sega

== N ==
Nim	-	-

== O ==
Os doze trabalhos de Jongo	-	-
Outsiders	-	-

== P ==
Palhacos	-	-
Penguin Land	Sega	Sega
Pense Bem	-	-
Pit Pot	Sega	Sega
Putt & Putter	SIMS	Sega

== R ==
Rainbow Islands	I.T.L	Sega
Rastan	Taito	Sega
Renegade	Natsume Co., Ltd.	Sega
Resta Um	-	-

== S ==
Satellite 7	Sega	Sega
Scramble Spirits	Arc System Works	Sega
Secret Commando	-	-
Senha	-	-
Sepentes	-	-
Shadow Dancer	Sega	Sega
Shinobi	Sega	Sega
Slap Shot	Sanritsu	Sega
Snowball	-
Sonic Drift 2	Sega/Arc System Works	Sega
Sonic the Hedgehog	Ancient Corporation	Sega
Special Criminal Investigation	Natsume Co., Ltd.	Sega
Sudoku	-	-
Super Space Invaders	The Kremlin	Domark
Super Tennis	Sega	Sega

== T ==
Tangram	-	-
Tanques	-	-
The New Zealand Story	Tecmagik	Tecmagik
The Ninja	Sega	Sega
Thunder Blade	Sega	Sega
Trans-Bot	Sega	Sega

== W ==
Woody Pop	Sega	Sega
World Grand Prix	Sega	Sega
World Soccer/Great Soccer 2	Sega	Sega
