= List of Sanritsu/SIMS games =

The list of games by Sanritsu/SIMS includes, unless otherwise noted:

== Arcade ==
- Bank Panic (バンクパニック) (1983)
- Change Leon (???) (1982)
- Combat Hawk (1987)
- Dr. Micro (1983)
- Dream Shopper (1982)
- Get Bass: Sega Bass Fishing (ゲットバス ソフト単品) / Sega Bass Fishing (1998)
- Janputer (1981)
- Jantotsu Super (1983)
- Kikiipatsu Mayumi-chan (1988)
- Mahjong Kyou Jidai (1986)
- Maximum Speed (2003)
- Mermaid / Yachtsman (1982)
- Quiz Ah! Megami Sama: Tatakau Tsubasa Totomo Ni (クイズ ああっ女神さまっ ～闘う翼とともに～ 通常版) (2000)
- Quiz Jump (1983)
- Red Selector (1982)
- Ron 2-nin Mahjong (1980)
- Ron 2-nin Mahjong 2 (1980)
- Roppyakuken (1983)
- Rougien (1982)
- Sega Marine Fishing (セガマリンフィッシング) (1999)
- Space War (Clone of Space Invaders) (1978)
- Sports Shooting USA (2003)
- Triple Punch (1982)
- Van-Van Car (1983)

== Nintendo Entertainment System ==
Release date	Title	Publisher
1988.12.02; 1989	Alien Syndrome (エイリアン シンドローム)	Sunsoft; Tengen
Unreleased	Dump Matsumoto (ダンプ松本)	

== Master System ==
- Aerial Assault (1990)
- Air Rescue (1992)
- Alien Storm (1991)
- Assault City (1990)
- Bomber Raid (1988)
- Bonanza Bros. (1991)
- Buggy Run (1993)
- Disney's Aladdin (1994)
- E-SWAT (1990)
- Forgotten Worlds (1990)
- G-LOC: Air Battle (1991)
- Gain Ground (1990)
- George Foreman's KO Boxing (1992)
- Golfamania (1990)
- James "Buster" Douglas Knockout Boxing (US) / Heavyweight Champ (PAL) (1990)
- Line of Fire (1991)
- Mahjong Sengoku Jidai (1987)
- Masters of Combat (1993)
- Master of Darkness (PAL) / Vampire (BR) (1992)
- Ninja Gaiden (1992)
- Psychic World (1991)
- Putt & Putter / Minigolf (1992)
- Slap Shot (1990)
- Tecmo World Cup '93 (1993)
- Tennis Ace (1989)
- Tom and Jerry: The Movie (1992)
- Wanted (1989)
- Wimbledon (1992)
- Wimbledon II (1993)

== Mega Drive/Genesis ==
Release date	Title	Publisher
1994	ATP Tour Championship Tennis; ATP Tour	Sega
Unreleased	Devil Buster	
1990.10.27; 1990	Dynamite Duke (ダイナマイトデューク)	Sega
1991.01.03; 1991	Gain Ground (ゲイングランド)	Sega; Renovation
1995	Mighty Morphin Power Rangers: The Movie	Sega
1991.08.09; 1991	Out Run (アウトラン)	Sega
1993.03.26; 1993	Out Run 2019 (アウトラン 2019)	SIMS; Sega
Unreleased	Rouhei	
1992.01.31; 1992	Tecmo World Cup '92 (テクモワールドカップ'92); Tecmo World Cup	SIMS; Atlus
1989	Tetris (テトリス) Not released into retail channels due to legal issues	Sega
1993; 1994.05.20	Wimbledon Championship Tennis; Wimbledon (ウィンブルドン)	Sega

On October 12, 1990, Sanritsu published Fatman, developed by Activision, in Japan

== Game Gear ==
- Alien Syndrome (エイリアンシンドローム) (1992)
- Buster Fight (バスター・ファイト) (1994)
- Disney's Aladdin (1994)
- Fantasy Zone Gear: Opa Opa Jr. no Bouken (ファンタジーゾーンGear オパオパJr.の冒険) (JP) (1991)

Fantasy Zone (US, EU)

- Fred Couples Golf (1994)
- From TV Animation Slam Dunk: Shouri heno Starting 5 (テレビアニメ スラムダンク 勝利へのスターティング5) (1994)
- George Foreman's KO Boxing (1992)
- Godzilla: Kaijuu Daishingeki (ゴジラ～怪獣大進撃～) (1995)
- Heavyweight Champ (ヘビーウェイト チャンプ) (1991)
- Honoo no Tokyuuji: Dodge Danpei (炎の闘球児ドッジ弾平) (1992)
- In the Wake of Vampire (JP) (1992)

Vampire: Master of Darkness (US, EU, BR)

- J.League Soccer: Dream Eleven (1995)
- J.League GG Pro Striker '94 (JリーグGGプロストライカー'94) (1994)
- Kick & Rush (JP) (1993)

Tengen World Cup Soccer (US, EU)

- McDonald's: Ronald no Magical World (マクドナルド～ドナルドのマジカルワールド) (1994)
- Megami Tensei Gaiden: Last Bible (女神転生外伝～ラストバイブル～) (1994)
- Megami Tensei Gaiden: Last Bible Special (女神転生外伝ラストバイブルスペシャル) (1995)
- Mighty Morphin Power Rangers (1994)
- Mighty Morphin Power Rangers: The Movie (1995)
- Out Run (アウトラン) (1991)
- Putt & Putter (パット＆パター) (1991)

Minigolf (BR)

- Scratch Golf (スクラッチゴルフ) (1994)
- Tails' Sky Patrol (テイルスのスカイパトロール) (1995) Co-developed with JSH
- Tempo Jr. (テンポJR．) (1995)
- Tom and Jerry: The Movie (トム＆ジェリー[ザ・ムービー]) (1993)
- Wimbledon (ウィンブルドン) (1992)

== Mega CD/Sega CD ==
Release date	Title	Publisher
1992.12.25	Capcom no Quiz: Tonosama no Yabou (カプコンのクイズ殿様の野望)	SIMS
Unreleased	Ranpin	
1994.02.25	Shin Megami Tensei (真・女神転生)	SIMS
1993.10.22; 1994	Vay: Ryuusei no Yoroi (Vay 流星の鎧); Vay	SIMS; Working Designs

== Sega Saturn ==
Release date	Title	Publisher
1998.01.29	Honkaku Shougi Shinan Wakamatsu Shougi Jyuku (本格将棋指南 若松将棋塾)	SIMS
1995.12.15; 1996	Kaitei Daisensou (海底大戦争); In the Hunt	Imagineer; Kokopeli (THQ)
1997.11.27	Message Navi (メッセージ・ナビ)	SIMS
1998.02.26	Message Navi 2 (メッセージ・ナビVOL．2)	SIMS
1996.02.09	PD Ultraman Link (PDウルトラマンリンク)	Bandai
1998.02.26	Stellar Assault SS (ステラアサルトSS)	SIMS
1997.06.13	Taiheiyou No Arashi 2: Shippuu no Moudou (太平洋の嵐2 疾風の艨艟)	Imagineer
1995.07.21	Virtual Volleyball (バーチャルバレーボール)	Imagineer

== PlayStation ==
Release date	Title	Publisher
2000.04.06	Maboroshi Tsukiyo: Tsukiyo no Kitan (まぼろし月夜 月夜野綺譚)	Naxat Soft

== Dreamcast ==
Release date	Title	Publisher
1999.04.01; 1999.10.06; 1999	Get Bass: Sega Bass Fishing (ゲットバス); Sega Bass Fishing	SIMS
2001.03.22	Harusame Youbi (春雨曜日)	NEC Interchannel
1999.09.23	Maboroshi Tsukiyo (まぼろし月夜)	SIMS
2000.11.30	Quiz Ah! Megami Sama: Tatakau Tsubasa Totomo ni (クイズ ああっ女神さまっ ～闘う翼とともに～ 通常版)	Sega
2000.10.17; 2000.10.19	Sega Marine Fishing (セガマリンフィッシング)	Sega

== PlayStation 2 ==
Release date	Title	Publisher
2004.03.25	After Burner II Sega Ages 2500 Series Vol. 10 (アフターバーナーII SEGA AGES 2500シリーズ Vol. 10)	3D-Ages
2003.11.06	Big Bass: Bass Tsuri Kanzen Kouryaku SuperLite 2000 (ビッグバスバス釣り完全攻略)	Success
2003.12.18	Columns Sega Ages 2500 Series Vol. 7 (コラム SEGA AGES 2500シリーズ Vol. 7)*	3D-Ages
2003.08.28	Fantasy Zone Sega Ages 2500 Series Vol. 3 (フアンタジーゾーン SEGA AGES 2500シリーズ Vol.3)*	3D-Ages
2003.09.25	Golden Axe Sega Ages 2500 Series Vol. 5 (ゴールデンアアックス SEGA AGES 2500シリーズ Vol.5)*	3D-Ages
2004.03.25	Hokuto no Ken Sega Ages 2500 Series Vol. 11 (北斗の拳 SEGA AGES 2500シリーズ Vol. 11)	3D-Ages
2003.08	Mark Davis Pro Bass Challenge	Natsume
2004.07.01	Monkey Turn V (モンキーターンV)	Bandai
2004.05.27	Out Run Sega Ages 2500 Series Vol. 13 (アウトラン SEGA AGES 2500シリーズ Vol. 13)*	3D-Ages
2005.06.09	Steamboy (スチームボーイ)	Bandai
2003.12.09	Top Angler: Real Bass Fishing	Xicat Interactive, Inc.

* Included in Sega Classics Collection, published by Sega in the US and Europe

== Nintendo GameCube ==
Release date	Title	Publisher
2005.10.25	Mark Davis Pro Bass Challenge	Natsume
2003.07.18; 2004.04.28	Top Angler: Real Bass Fishing	Xicat Interactive, Inc.

== Wii ==
Release date	Title	Publisher
2003.??.?? 2007.09.03	Hooked! Real Motion Fishing	Aksys Games
