= ESWAT =

ESWAT may refer to:

- Cyber Police ESWAT , a 1989 scrolling shooter arcade game developed and published by Sega
- ESWAT: City under Siege, a 1990 side scrolling platform video game for the Mega Drive/Genesis video game console
- ESWAT, a fictional force in Appleseed and Appleseed Ex Machina, name: Extra Special Weapons and Tactics
