= Slapshot (disambiguation) =

A slapshot is the fastest and hardest shot in ice hockey, when a player strikes the puck in a swinging rotation.

Slapshot or Slap Shot may also refer to:

- Slap Shot, an ice hockey film starring Paul Newman
  - Slap Shot 2: Breaking the Ice, a 2002 sequel to Slap Shot
  - Slap Shot 3: The Junior League, a 2008 sequel to Slap Shot and Slap Shot 2: Breaking the Ice
- Slapshot (band), an American hardcore punk band
- Slapshot (mascot), the mascot of the Washington Capitals of the NHL
- Slap Shot (video game), a 1990 Sega ice hockey video game
