= Monster Bash (disambiguation) =

Monster Bash is a 1993 video game for MS-DOS.

Monster Bash may also refer to:

- Monster Bash (pinball), pinball machine
- Monster Bash, 1982 Sega arcade game that inspired Ghost House
- Monster Bash, a celebration by the Bash Brothers which originated in baseball and inspired a song

== See also ==
- Monster Mash (disambiguation)
