= Aerial Assault (disambiguation) =

Aerial Assault may refer to:

- Air assault, a type of military operation
- Aerial Assault, a console video game
- Aerial Assault, an episode of The Transformers television series
- Tribes: Aerial Assault, an online first-person shooter video game
