= Golden Axe Warrior =

1991 video game

- Developer: Sega
- Publisher: Sega
- Designers: Gen Adachi; Takako Kawaguchi
- Programmer: Pochi Nakamori
- Composer: Chikako Kamatani
- Series: Golden Axe
- Platform: Master System
- Release: NA: April 1991; EU: May 1991
- Genre: Action-adventure
- Mode: Single-player

Golden Axe Warrior is a 1991 action-adventure video game developed and published by Sega for the Master System. A spin-off of the Golden Axe series, the player controls a male human warrior in the fictional country of Firewood as they try to avenge the death of their parents by defeating the tyrant Death Adder and recovering nine missing crystals.

In a deviation from previous Golden Axe titles, the game incorporates gameplay similar to The Legend of Zelda. The player navigates an overworld and dungeons from a top-down perspective, defeating enemies, collecting items and discovering secrets. Traditional role-playing game elements, such as exploring towns, are also implemented.

Golden Axe Warrior is often subject to mixed critical reception, due to its similarities to The Legend of Zelda and Zelda II: The Adventure of Link. The game was re-released on the Xbox 360 and PlayStation 3 as part of the 2009 compilation Sonic's Ultimate Genesis Collection.

== Plot ==
In ancient times, a horde of giants rebels against the country of Firewood and are successful. A brutal war ensues between the two sides and it seems that the giants will win. That is until an unknown hero drives back the giants using the power of the Golden Axe, the only weapon that is known to defeat them. In present day, Firewood is prosperous under a monarchical rule and the help of nine magic crystals, which contain powers that can harness magic and help ward off evil from the country.

One day, a government minister betrays the king by selling the nine crystals to the tyrant Death Adder who is a descendant of the giants from ancient times. Immediately Death Adder invades the neighboring countries of Altorulia and Nendoria before invading Firewood too, killing the royal families of those countries in the process. He also creates ten labyrinths, one for his protection under the sea and the rest to house the crystals so that no one can halt his conquest. Hailing from the town of Miliver in Firewood, a young warrior sets off on a quest to kill the tyrant and to recover the crystals so he can avenge his parents, whom Death Adder killed. As the warrior travels throughout Firewood, Altorulia and Nendoria he traverses the labyrinths containing the crystals and obtains them, finds the Golden Axe and learns how to cast elemental magic. He also learns that he is the son of the king of Altorulia and that the princess of Firewood, Tyris, is still alive.

After obtaining the Golden Axe, the warrior enters the final labyrinth under the sea armed with the axe and crystals ready to kill Death Adder. After a fierce battle with the tyrant, the warrior successfully defeats Death Adder. The warrior returns home with great celebration from the people of Firewood, Nendoria, and Altorulia. A great feast and various other festivities are held in his honor. The people of the three countries then decide to unite as one collective country of Firewood under the rule of Princess Tyris. The Golden Axe returns to its resting place, away from the mortal world, as it awaits a time when the world will be in peril once more. It is promised that the warrior's battle with Death Adder will be told as legend for years to come.

== Gameplay ==
Golden Axe Warrior is a fantasy action-adventure game. Players take control of the game's hero, who can be named at the start of a new quest. The game features a large overworld with over 200 unique screens and many enemies. Players must retrieve each of the game's nine crystals by locating hidden labyrinths. Each labyrinth is guarded by monsters and full of puzzles that must be solved in order to reach the boss and retrieve the crystal. Throughout the game, players collect various items and abilities that allow access to previously unreachable areas. The tenth labyrinth is only accessible after collecting the nine crystals. Players must then find the Golden Axe and use it to defeat Death Adder.

Weapons and armor can be upgraded and several magic abilities can be learned. Using magic requires the use of pots which are depleted after every use. The game's currency is horns collected from enemies; these horns can be spent in towns throughout the game. Hidden areas can be uncovered by chopping down trees with an axe or clearing rocks using Earth magic.

== Development and release ==
The game is considered to be one of the system's rarest games. It is included as an unlockable game in Sonic's Ultimate Genesis Collection for the PlayStation 3 and Xbox 360.

== Reception ==
Reception

Review scores
Publication	Score
Aktueller Software Markt	10/12
Computer and Video Games	42%
Joystick	88%
Player One	88%
RPGFan	94%
Video Games (DE)	81%
Console XS	67/100
Gamers	1-
Mean Machines	40%
Power Play	82%
Sega Power	68%
Sega Pro	63/100

Golden Axe Warrior garnered mixed reception from critics. GamePro's Bro. Buzz, despite comparing it to NES titles such as The Legend of Zelda and Willow, said that it is a great game. Computer and Video Games regarded it as an "incredibly dull RPG". Matt Regan and Julian Rignall of Mean Machines called it "boring" and "tedious", recommending Ys and Lord of the Sword instead.

IGN mentioned the game in its article "A History of Gaming's Most Shameless Rip-Offs", calling it a rip-off of The Legend of Zelda. They noted similarities in enemies and map designs, and called the soundtrack "eerily similar" to Zelda but without any of the personality.
