= Monster Mash (disambiguation) =

"Monster Mash" is a 1962 novelty song by Bobby "Boris" Pickett.

Monster Mash may also refer to:

== Entertainment ==
- Monster Mash (1995 film), a horror-themed musical film, starring Bobby "Boris" Pickett
- Monster Mash (2000 film), a DIC Entertainment film

== People with the nickname ==
- Jamal Mashburn (born 1972), American former professional basketball player

== See also ==
- Monster Bash (disambiguation)
