= Wanted (video game) =

1989 video game

- Developer: Sanritsu
- Publisher: Sega
- Designer: Nannorio
- Platform: Master System
- Release: NA: August 1989; EU: November 1989
- Genre: Shooting gallery
- Mode: Single-player

Wanted (募集) is a shoot 'em up released by Sega in August 1989 for the Master System. The player controls a sheriff in the American Old West, attempting to eliminate bandits from around the cities in the game. The game requires the Sega Light Phaser controller. Some copies of the game were released with a misprinted cover art that erroneously described Cloud Master.

== Gameplay ==
The player assumes the role of a Western sheriff, who engages in gunfights in varied locations throughout the American Old West. The game requires quick reactions, as the player has only a moment to shoot an enemy gunslinger after they appear to avoid being shot and losing a health point. The player may shoot bombs hidden among the level scenery, clearing the screen of enemies and replenishing the player's life. The player must also take care not to shoot innocent civilians, or gunmen who surrender, either of which will result in lost health. The end of each round features a boss battle with a bandit leader.
