= Double Hawk =

1990 video game

- Developer(s): Opera House
- Publisher(s): Sega
- Platform(s): Master System
- Release: EU: 1990
- Genre(s): Shooter
- Mode(s): Single-player; Multiplayer

Double Hawk is a shoot 'em up video game for the Master System. In the 1990s violence was spreading across the globe, brought forth by a group of terrorists, and John Jackson and Jack Thomas are sent into battle to eradicate all threats. Double Hawk has been called Sega's version of Cabal (which was ported to the rival Nintendo Entertainment System the same year).

== Gameplay ==
The game consists of five missions, each with four levels ending in a boss fight. Throughout the game the player must eliminate various enemies including foot soldiers, armed vehicles, and helicopters using multiple guns and ordnance weapons. The player must survive the first 3 stages of every mission within a time limit, and while the 4th "boss" fight of every mission is also timed, that mission will not end until all enemy units have been eliminated.

A unique element that features in this game is that in co-op gameplay, players that gets hit 3 times and dies will automatically re-spawn and take a hit off their co-op partner, provided their partner is not down to their last hit.

Various upgrades can be found in each level to facilitate game play. These upgrades would be in the form of colored boxes that fall from enemies that have been taken down. They include:

- Red [S] - Shooting - for a limited time, the player has a larger target range and faster shooting upgrades, which is useful for taking down air-based attacks from helicopters and planes
- Navy [R] - Rapid Fire - for a limited time, the player has the rapid fire ability with his gun, which is useful for taking down ground-based attacks from tanks and heavy machinery.
- Light blue [B] - Bombs - the player receives 10 hand bombs (grenades) to use on the enemy. The player is limited to carry a maximum of 99 grenades.
- Brown [F] - Faster - for the duration of the rest of that particular stage, the player is able to move around and aim his gun faster, useful for dodging bullets.

None of these upgrades remain with the player if he or she continues from a gameover.
