= Blade Eagle 3-D =

1988 video game

- Developer: Sega
- Publisher: Sega
- Platform: Master System
- Release: JP: March 26, 1988; NA: September 1988; EU: 1988
- Genre: Scrolling shooter
- Mode: Single-player

Blade Eagle 3-D (Note: Japanese: ブレードイーグルの 3-D, Hepburn: Buredoiguru 3-D) is a 1988 vertically scrolling shooter video game developed and published by Sega for the Master System. Controlling a starship, the player is tasked with destroying waves of robotic forces across nine levels. The starship used can be swapped between three different modules at anytime, which provides different stats and power-ups depending on the one used.

== Gameplay ==
Players fight against hundreds of robot warriors equipped with particle beam weapons. The game is played from the bird's eye view. The player's mission is to blast through nine levels of various 3D terrain, shooting aliens and ships on three different planes.

One of the buttons is used to cycle through the three planes. Along the way, there are several bosses that the player has to defeat. The later ones drop a power-up, which the player can use to upgrade the ship. Some of the power-ups include double shots and laser beams. Another power-up gives players an extra ship on their side. The first one joins the fight, later ones go into reserve. Blade Eagle is designed for play in conjunction with the Sega 3-D Glasses.
