= Running Battle =

1991 video game

- Developer: Opera House
- Publisher: Sega
- Platform: Master System
- Release: EU: October 1991
- Genre: Beat 'em up
- Mode: Single-player

Running Battle is a 1991 beat 'em up game developed by Opera House and published by Sega for the Master System exclusively in Europe. The player controls a police officer as they eliminate a series of enemies over five levels.

== Gameplay ==
This game is a brawler where the police officer has to eliminate a series of armed thugs that are trying to take over his city. The enemy leader's name is simply the letter "M" and he calls his troops "The Soldiers of Darkness". Players can only move from left to right, like in a side-scrolling platform game. The player can also regain health from certain power-ups, in addition to getting a temporary boost in muscle power and the temporary ability to access weapons.

There are five levels in the game, which are divided into sub-levels and end with a confrontation with a powerful boss. Each section can be crossed over without killing anyone. However, the player is required to destroy a minimum amount of enemies on the screen.

== Reception ==
Reception

Review score
Publication	Score
Mean Machines	54%

The game was negatively reviewed by Mean Machines magazine for its low quality graphics, sound and gameplay.
