= Sega World Tournament Golf =

1993 video game

- Developer(s): Sega
- Publisher(s): Sega
- Platform(s): Master System
- Release: EU: July 1993
- Genre(s): Sports
- Mode(s): Single-player, multiplayer

Sega World Tournament Golf is a 1993 sports video game published by Sega for the Master System. It is notable among 8-bit video games for its accommodation of up to four players.

== Gameplay ==
A number of competition formats are available, including 'Medal' in which up to four players can compete over 18 holes, 'Championship' in which up to four players may join a fifty-four-strong tournament over up to 72 holes, 'Matchplay' in which two players compete on a hole-by-hole basis, and 'Skins' in which at least three players contend holes for fictional money.

The gameplay takes a bird's-eye view perspective, with a number of 2.5D elements. The player(s) are given the option of a variety of clubs and golf courses, as well as three skill levels.

== Reception ==
Reception

Review score
Publication	Score
Sega Master Force	78%

Sega Master Force magazine expressed reservations about the game's complex parameters and placed particular criticism upon the simplistic audio, commenting that "the graphics and sound are a little disappointing" and that "the course is just one big mass of greenery with the occasional sand pit". Praise was, however, given to the realism and depth of gameplay, along with a comment that it was one of the best sports titles available on the Master System.
