= Sega Ninja =

1985 video game

- Japanese arcade flyer
- Developer: Sega R&D1
- Publisher: Sega
- Artist: Rieko Kodama
- Platforms: Arcade, SG-1000, MSX, Master System
- Release: March 1985: Arcade; JP: March 1985 SG-1000; JP: February 1986 MSX; JP: May 1986 Master System; JP: 8 November 1986; NA: December 1986; EU: November 1987
- Genre: Run and gun
- Modes: Single-player, multiplayer
- Arcade system: Sega System 1

Sega Ninja, originally released as Ninja Princess (Note: Japanese: 忍者プリンセス, Hepburn: Ninja Purinsesu) in Japan, is a 1985 run and gun video game developed and published by Sega for arcades. The player controls Princess Kurumi (くるみ姫 Kurumi-Hime), the titular female ninja, who battles enemies using throwing knives and shurikens. In contrast to most later games in the genre, Ninja Princess has a feudal Japan setting with a female ninja protagonist.

A revised edition for the Mark III console, titled Ninja Princess 1 Mega Ban - Ninja (忍者プリンセス1メガ版 忍者), was released in 1986, replacing the female protagonist with a male ninja protagonist who has to rescue her. This version was later released as The Ninja for the Master System internationally.

== Gameplay ==
Screenshot

Ninja Princess is a run and gun video game. The gameplay involves the player shooting enemies and defeating bosses along the way. Enemies include samurai, ninja and dogs. The player's normal weapons are an unlimited supply of throwing knives, but power-ups to shurikens are available. In addition, the player can also turn invisible for a short period of time. While most of the stages are vertically scrolling, a few of the levels add some variety including a level where the player must scale a wall.

== Plot ==
The game is set during Japan's Edo period, in about the year 1630, in a province called Ohkami in the western region, where the power has been seized by an evil tyrant named Gyokuro. The goal is to end his oppressive rule and restore peace.

== Ports ==
Sega Ninja was released as The Ninja for the Master System (pictured: box, cartridge and instructions)

Ports of the game were released for Sega's SG-1000 and Master System consoles. The latter version, retitled Ninja Princess 1 Mega Ban - Ninja, was released a year after the arcade game and changed the protagonist from female to male. Other changes include the rearranging of stages from the original Japanese release in western releases of the game as well as a scroll system, which requires the player to collect five green scrolls in order to get to the final level of the game, as all of them give hints on how the final level must be entered. If the player finishes the game without them, the game will backtrack to a level closest to where a missing scroll lies. Graphics are also different, made in a more realistic style.

== Reception ==
In Japan, Game Machine listed Ninja Princess as the most successful table arcade cabinet of April 1985.

Computer Gaming World stated that the Master System version was the most entertaining of three martial arts games that Sega released together (the others being Black Belt and Kung Fu Kid), and approved of its unusual visual perspective.

== Legacy ==
In 2017, Sam Derboo of Hardcore Gaming 101 noted that Ninja Princess predates Capcom's genre-popularizing run and gun shooter Commando (1985), and he considers Ninja Princess to be "in some ways the more advanced concept." While he considered Commando to be a refinement of Taito's Front Line (1982), he said that Ninja Princess brought "a fresh setting and interesting new elements." He also praises the female protagonist, but criticizes the console versions for making the protagonist a male ninja who has to rescue her instead. He nevertheless considers it "no doubt one of the better overhead run-n-gun shooters out in the mid-’80s."

Sega Ninja is a plot point in the novel Ready Player Two (2020).
