= Master of Darkness =

1992 video game

- Developer: SIMS
- Publishers: JP: SIMS; WW: Sega
- Composers: Yoko Wada; Takashi Horiguchi
- Platforms: Game Gear; Master System
- Release: Game Gear: JP: October 23, 1992; EU: 1993; NA: June 1993; Master System: EU: 1992
- Genre: Platform
- Mode: Single-player

Master of Darkness (Note: Game Gear version released in Japan as In the Wake of Vampire (イン ザ ウエイク オブ ヴァンパイア, In Za Ueiku Obu Vanpaia)) (Note: Game Gear version released in North America as Vampire: Master of Darkness) is an action-platform video game developed and published by SIMS for the Game Gear and Master System. Sega, who would later acquire SIMS, released the game outside Japan.

The initial setting of the game is London. A psychologist believes that a recent series of murders have been performed by Count Dracula, and is searching for the vampire to defeat him. Dracula is actually dead. The murders are instead performed by Jack the Ripper, who is trying to achieve Dracula's resurrection through human sacrifice rituals.

== Overview ==
Master of Darkness is a platform game, very similar to Castlevania. The plot has the player entering the role of a Ouija board-playing psychologist named Dr. Ferdinand Social. He is looking to defeat Count Dracula, who is behind a series of killings in London that have been attributed to Jack the Ripper. However, Jack the Ripper is indeed responsible, for he is using the victim's bodies and fresh blood for sacrificial offerings – as part of a dark ritual being performed by Count Massen to resurrect Dracula. Also taking some part in the murders and the dark ritual is a mysterious Psychic Girl, who is possessed by an evil Skull Spirit.

The game requires the player to battle their way through five rounds, which are divided into three lengthy stages. The rounds consists of the Thames River, House of Wax, a Cemetery that leads to Count Massen's Castle, a laboratory within Massen's Castle, and finally being teleported to a dungeon-like Labyrinth within Castle Dracula, which resides in a forest of Transylvania. At the end of each round is a boss, a person with connection to the murders and dark ritual who must be defeated. The bosses are Jack the Ripper, a Psychic Girl possessed by a Skull Spirit, Count Massen, performer of the rituals, and finally Dracula himself.

Enemies the player must battle include zombies, sharply-dressed gun-toting hooligans, bats, dogs, wolves, poltergeists possessing various decorations, skeleton knights, magical sword-wielding wizards, owls, and ghost maidens. To defeat the enemies, players can utilize several primary and secondary weapons. Primary weapons are close combat weapons which includes knives, walking canes, rapiers and axes, that differ in range and efficiency. Secondary weapons are long-range weapons, which consists of pistols, bombs, and boomerangs – with limited ammunition. The player can only possess one type of primary and secondary weapon. Picking up a new weapon means it automatically replaces the previous weapon in the player's inventory.

== Reception ==
Both the Game Gear and Master System versions were well received critically, drawing particular praise for the detailed graphics and responsive controls. Another factor may be that the Castlevania series was yet to appear on a Sega console and Master of Darkness was the closest – in terms of quality and gameplay – that the Master System had come to replicating the experience.

Sega Force gave Master of Darkness a composite score of 79% between its two reviewers Mat Yeo and Paul Wooding. Mat rated it an 83% noting its visuals and Gothic atmosphere, while stating a few of the enemies could be annoying, particularly the dog. Paul gave the game a 74% stating the controls to be easy to use while considering the difficulty to be on the high side and the game play to occasionally be repetitive. Power Unlimited gave the Game Gear version 80% writing: "It starts slowly, but if you persevere you will find that Vampire: Master of Darkness is very varied. Add to that the creepy horror atmosphere with enough vampires, bats and voodoo, and you have a great platform game."

== See also ==
- List of Game Gear games
- List of Master System games
