= Cyber Police ESWAT =

1989 video game

- Japanese arcade flyer
- Developer: Sega R&D1
- Publishers: Sega; Home computers U.S. Gold
- Designers: Nandemo, Macco; Chan, Seishi; Atsumiya, Mikarin
- Composer: Yasuhiro Kawakami
- Platforms: Arcade, Amiga, Amstrad CPC, Atari ST, Commodore 64, ZX Spectrum
- Release: Arcade: JP: May 28, 1989; NA: September 1989; Home computers: EU: November 1990
- Genre: Run and gun
- Modes: Single-player, multiplayer
- Arcade system: System 16

Cyber Police ESWAT (サイバーポリス イースワット) is a 1989 run and gun video game developed and published by Sega for arcades. The player controls Duke Oda, a member of the Liberty City Cyber Police Force tasked with finding and arresting the city's most wanted criminals, and eventually dismantling a terrorist organization planning world domination. In 1990, Sega released a separate version for the Sega Genesis and Master System, known in North America as ESWAT: City Under Siege.

== Gameplay ==
In the arcade game's first stage, players start out as a regular police officer.

The gameplay is similar to Sega's own Shinobi (1987), as the player has the ability to jump up and down between planes where possible. The goal of each of the game's 15 stages is to find and arrest a specific wanted criminal, who is usually fought at the end of the stage as a boss. Duke is initially armed with only a single-shot pistol, but upon arresting the first three criminals and being promoted to ESWAT, Duke is equipped with a Power Suit with a mounted machine gun for the rest of the game. The suit also has access to limited-use special weapons which can be found within stages. However, both of Duke's standard weapons require ammunition, without which the player can only attack with a kick. Additional ammunition can be found in boxes throughout each stage.

== Hardware/conversion ==
The game was issued on Sega's System 16-B which is built around the M68000 and uses a Z80 and a YM2151 for amplified mono sound generation. The System 16 pinout is not JAMMA compatible but JAMMA adaptors are available and fairly common. The game was released in a dedicated two player cabinet and also as a kit that contained the System 16 to JAMMA adaptor. Each player requires one start button, one joystick, and three action buttons (shoot, jump, special weapons). This game utilizes a standard resolution arcade monitor.

== Reception ==
Computer and Video Games called the game a cross between NARC and RoboCop, but wrote that it "doesn't quite have the flair of either". Rating the game at 76% overall, they recommended only playing Cyber Police if they were bored with the two other games.
