= Quartet (video game) =

1986 video game

- Arcade flyer
- Developer: Sega
- Publisher: Sega
- Designer: Rieko Kodama
- Composer: Katsuhiro Hayashi
- Platforms: Arcade, Master System, Amstrad CPC, Commodore 64, ZX Spectrum
- Release: JP: April 10, 1986; NA: June 1986; EU: 1986
- Genre: Run and gun
- Modes: Single-player, multiplayer
- Arcade system: Sega System 16

Quartet (Note: Japanese: カルテット) is a run and gun video game released by Sega for arcades in 1986. Quartet allows one to four players to guide a set of characters through a base taken over by an army of robots. Players control either Joe (yellow), Mary (red), Lee (blue), or Edgar (green) across 32 side-scrolling levels. The object of the game is to advance through the level, fighting opponents which come out of portals in the walls, and eventually defeat a boss that carries the door key used to open the "exit door".

The game was released as a dedicated four-player cabinet similar to Atari Games' Gauntlet. A 2-players version, titled Quartet 2, was released by Sun Electronics, as a conversion kit. The game was ported to the Master System, Commodore 64, Amstrad CPC, and ZX Spectrum.

== Reception ==
In Japan, Game Machine listed Quartet on their May 1, 1986 issue as being the second most-successful upright/cockpit arcade unit of the month. In the United States, the game topped the Play Meter arcade earnings chart in August 1986.
