= Sanritsu Denki =

Japanese video game development studio

Sanritsu Denki is a Japanese video game publisher and developer. SIMS Co., Ltd. was established on June 12, 1984, as a joint venture of Sanritsu and Sega Enterprises, Ltd.

It was responsible for games such as:

- Dr Micro (arcade) (1983 by Sanritsu)
- Aerial Assault (Master System) (1990)
- Assault City (Master System) (1990)
- Alien Syndrome (Master System) (1987)
- Mahjong Sengoku Jidai (Master System) (1987)
- Appoooh (arcade) (1984)
- Bank Panic (arcade) (1984)
- Out Run (arcade) (1986)
- Bomber Raid (Master System) (1989)
- Wanted (Master System) (1989)
- Assault City (Master System) (1990)
- Bonanza Bros. (Master System) (1990)
- ESWAT: City Under Siege (Master System) (1990)
- Peepar Time (Famicom) (1990)
- Slap Shot (Master System) (1990)
- Golfamania (Master System) (1990)
- James 'Buster' Douglas Knockout Boxing (Master System) (1990)
- Slaughter Sport (Mega Drive) (1990)
- CrossFire (NES) (1990)
- Tennis Ace (Master System) (1990)
- Gain Ground (Mega Drive, Master System) (1991)
- Dynamite Duke (Master System) (1991)
- Fantasy Zone (Game Gear) (1991)
- Forgotten Worlds (Master System) (1991)
- Line of Fire (Master System) (1991)
- Psychic World (Game Gear, Master System) (1991)
- G-LOC: Air Battle (Master System) (1992)

== See also ==
- List of Sanritsu/SIMS games
