= Psychic World =

1988 video game

- European Master System cover art
- Developers: Hertz Company; Sanritsu (Master System, Game Gear)
- Publisher: Sega
- Designer: Tsunetomo Sugawara
- Programmers: Yuji Kobayashi; Tōru Hosaka; Takahiro Yoshida
- Artists: Tsuneyoshi Sugawara; Isamu Kurosawa; Yoshiharu Kotaki
- Composers: Kenji Yamazaki; Yuko Yamazaki
- Platforms: MSX2, Master System, Game Gear
- Release: Psycho World: JP: 1988; Psychic World; Master System: EU: June 1991; Game Gear: JP: 2 February 1991; WW: 1991
- Genre: Action
- Mode: Single-player

Psychic World (サイキック・ワールド) is an action platform video game co-developed by Hertz and Sanritsu and published by Sega. Originally released in Japan for the MSX2 as Psycho World (サイコ・ワールド) in 1988, it was later released as Psychic World on the Master System exclusively in Europe and Game Gear worldwide in 1991.

== Gameplay ==
Psychic World is a platform game wherein the player's character Lucía runs from one stage to the other using her "ESP Booster" to blast monstrous enemies while obtaining item power-ups through them or by jumping on various ledges and platforms. The Booster has a gauge of how often certain items and abilities can be used, but that, as with her health, can be replenished by power-ups. All her weapons are upgradeable by merely picking up the same item for that particular weapon and new weapons are obtained through mini-bosses and end-level bosses. The player has to use Lucia's psionic weapons strategically in levels using different elements to their advantage: in the ice stage, rocks being doused by falling water can be frozen and used as a stable platform for Lucía to jump on by blasting the rock with the ice shot, while the sonic wave weapon can destroy certain foreground objects blocking her path.

== Plot ==
Taking place at a remote laboratory in the year 19XX, a three-staff research team consisting of Dr. Knavik and his assistants the TWIN sisters Cecile and Lucia is studying the exploration and usage of ESP. One day while Lucia was getting ready for work, an explosion burst from the lab. By the time Lucia got there, Dr. Knavik was all right, but Cecile had disappeared. Dr. Knavik explains that part of his experiments involved running tests on a variety of monsters, but eventually the subjects rebelled and took Cecile with them. As Lucia follows the monster's track, Dr. Knavik gives her the ESP Booster, a device he created that will enable the user to wield psychic powers.

== Reception ==
Reception

Review score
Publication	Score
Famitsu	5/10, 5/10, 6/10, 3/10 (GG)

Psychic World for the Master System was given mixed but mostly positive reviews 70% by RAZE, and 69% by Video Games. The Game Gear version received a score of 83% from Joystick.
