= World Grand Prix (video game) =

1986 video game

- European cover art
- Developer: Sega
- Publisher: Sega
- Platform: Master System
- Release: JP: September 21, 1986; NA: October 1986; EU: November 1987
- Genre: Racing
- Mode: Single-player

World Grand Prix (ザ・サーキット; "The Circuit") is a 1986 racing video game developed and published by Sega for the Master System. The player drives a Formula One-style car as quickly as possible while navigating through turns and other vehicles on the road. A formal scoring system is not used; players are not ranked by position unlike most racing games. This kind of timekeeping would not be used in a subsequent video game until the release of the Taito Grand Prix: Eikō e no License on the Family Computer the following year.

== Reception ==
Computer and Video Games magazine rated the game 81% in 1989.
