= Air Rescue =

1992 video game

- Master System cover art
- Developers: Sega; SIMS (Master System)
- Publisher: Sega
- Platforms: Arcade, Master System
- Release: Arcade: WW: 1992; Master System: PAL: July 1992
- Genre: Action
- Mode: Single-player
- Arcade system: Sega System 32

Air Rescue is action game from Sega released in arcades in 1992. It runs on the Sega System 32 hardware. A Master System conversion has little in common with the original. The two games are similar to Choplifter, which Sega had adapted for arcades. The arcade version of Air Rescue has a first-person perspective, while the Master System version is side-scrolling. The Master System version was only released in PAL territories.

== Gameplay ==
The arcade version places players in the cockpit of the helicopter.

Both versions of Air Rescue share a similar concept to the original Choplifter. The player must pilot a helicopter, land it near hostages/prisoners behind enemy lines, and return them to the safety of the base.

The arcade version uses a first-person perspective and features full 3D movement throughout its environment, represented with large numbers of scaled sprites. The player can ascend or descent freely, as well as yaw left and right and move forward and back.

The Master System features completely different levels and a less overtly military theme from its arcade counterpart and should not be considered a port or a conversion as much as a tie-in game. It more closely resembles the classic 2D gameplay of Choplifter, but with levels that scroll in all directions. Air Rescue also features the ability to drop a rope ladder to rescue hostages without landing.

== Reception ==
In Japan, Game Machine listed Air Rescue on their May 15, 1992 issue as being the third most-successful upright arcade unit of the month.

In Play Meter magazine, Jim Overman gave the arcade game a rating of 92% and a "gut feeling" score of 8 out of 10. John Cook of Sinclair User gave the arcade game an 80% rating. They said "Sega are the tops" in technology, with praise for the "stunning visuals, playability" and "an interesting co-operative two player option." He said "it does fail to inspire quite as much as I would like it to" but "it is worth a few 10p's of anyone's money."
