= Aztec Adventure =

1987 video game

- Western box art
- Developer: Sega
- Publisher: Sega
- Platform: Master System
- Release: JP: September 20, 1987; NA: March 1988; EU: October 1988
- Genre: Action
- Mode: Single-player

Aztec Adventure, known in Japan as Nazca '88: The Golden Road to Paradise (ナスカ '88 -THE GOLDEN ROAD TO PARADISE-), is a 1987 action game developed and published by Sega for the Master System.

In the game, the player takes the control of Niño, an adventurer who must traverse a maze in search for treasures. While the original Japanese version depicts the adventure in Nazca, the story and title were later changed to be based in Aztec settings for international releases, though the elements of the former culture, including the Nazca Lines, can still be seen. The player is not the only one in search for those treasures, three other adventurers controlled by the computer will try to foil his plans.

== Gameplay ==
A gameplay screenshot

Gameplay involves the player trying to reach Paradise by exploring ten different lands, including desert, marshes, ruins, underground waterways and forest. While exploring you can collect weapons, by destroying enemies. A variety of in-game weapons can be found (fireballs, arrows, tornadoes, etc.), some more powerful than others. Some weapons can be used against bosses, which can take a certain number of hits from the player's default weapon, unless he has companions. The player's companions need to be hired with gold, and until he pays them they remain his enemies. The more powerful the companion, the more gold he requires to join the player's quest.
