= Assault City =

1990 video game

- Developer(s): Sanritsu
- Publisher(s): Sega
- Designer(s): Kouji Inokuchi; T. Asano; T. Katoh
- Composer(s): Izuho Takeeuchi
- Platform(s): Master System
- Release: EU: 1990
- Genre(s): Rail shooter
- Mode(s): Single-player

Assault City is a rail shooter released for the Master System in 1990. Two versions were released: the original, which only supports the directional pad, and a second edition which supports the Light Phaser gun. The two versions are distinguished by a large red light phaser on the cover of the second edition.

== Plot ==
The plot centers around Joe, one of the last of the humans remaining that can overturn the cybernetic revolt. Nothing can stop him from destroying the control system which forces the robots to kill. In the latter half of the 21st century, robots have been engaged in labor in dangerous places, housework, etc. Then suddenly, the control system used to function these robots plotted a revolt against the human race, and ordered every robot to annihilate all of the people. The robots robbed them of their weapons, and occupied various military bases and factories.

The war robots that were manufactured there murdered men, one after another, and the survivors organized a resistance and went into a full-scale offensive against the enemy's army.

== Reception ==
Console XS gave it an 83% score.
