= Final Blow =

1988 video game

- Arcade flyer
- Developer: Taito
- Publishers: JP: Taito; NA: Romstar; NA: Sega (Genesis)
- Platforms: Arcade, Sega Genesis, Amiga, Atari ST, Commodore 64, FM Towns
- Release: JP: April 1989; NA: June 1989
- Genre: Sports
- Modes: Single-player, multiplayer

Final Blow (Note: Japanese: ファイナルブロー, Hepburn: Fainaru Burō) is a 1989 boxing video game developed and released by Taito in arcades. It was released in Japan in April 1989 and in North America in June 1989 by Romstar.

In 1990, Sega released a port for the Sega Genesis titled James 'Buster' Douglas Knockout Boxing, which features American boxer James "Buster" Douglas immediately after his upset victory over Mike Tyson, who signed with Nintendo to appear in Punch-Out!! for the Nintendo Entertainment System years earlier. (The Master System game released under the Knockout Boxing title in North America is a distinct game developed by Sanritsu Denki; it was released in Europe under the title Heavyweight Champ, taken from a previous Sega arcade boxing game.)

Hamster Corporation released the game as part of their Arcade Archives series for the Nintendo Switch and PlayStation 4 in November 2024.

== Plot ==
The game follows a single season boxing championship run. There are five fictional fighters competing: Dynamite Joe - The Miracle Fighter, Fernando Gomez - The South American Eagle, Kim Nang - The Korean Comet, King Jason - The Black King - The Detroit Kid & The Invincible Black Panther.

== Gameplay ==
Final Blow is a side-scrolling boxing game where the player moves left and right to control a screen sized boxer. When the timing is right, the player can unleash a final blow punch which can sometimes KO the opponent in a single strike.

The home versions contain a spectator mode where the player can watch their favorite boxers compete.

The Sega Genesis port adds two boxers: James "Buster" Douglas (who uses The Detroit Kid's graphics, slightly edited and palette swapped) and Ironhead. It was one of the games used as part of the Genesis Does Campaign, particularly since Nintendo used Mike Tyson for its Mike Tyson's Punch-Out!! video game, whom Douglas had challenged and defeated that year.

== Reception ==
Reception

Review score
| Publication | Score |
|---|---|
| GamePro | GEN: 15/25 |

In Japan, Game Machine listed Final Blow on their June 1, 1989 issue as being the third most-successful table arcade unit of the month.

Mega placed the game at #9 in their list of the 10 Worst Mega Drive Games of All Time.
