= Action Fighter =

1986 video game

- Japanese arcade flyer
- Developer: Sega R&D2 (Note: Arcade version developed by Sega R&D1.)
- Publisher: Sega
- Composer: Tokuhiko Uwabo
- Platforms: Master System, arcade, Amiga, Amstrad CPC, Atari ST, Commodore 64, ZX Spectrum, MS-DOS
- Release: August 17, 1986: Master System; JP: August 17, 1986; NA: November 1986; PAL: August 1987 Arcade; JP: September 1986 Amiga, Atari ST, C64; NA: April 1989; EU: August 1989 CPC, ZX Spectrum; EU: August 1989 MS-DOS; NA: December 1989
- Genre: Vehicular combat
- Modes: Single-player, multiplayer
- Arcade system: Sega System 16

Action Fighter (アクション ファイター) is a 1986 vehicular combat game developed and published by Sega for the Master System. It was ported to Japanese arcades shortly after its release, and later to the Amiga, Amstrad CPC, Atari ST, Commodore 64, ZX Spectrum and IBM PC compatible computers in 1989.

The player begins the game riding a superbike. In subsequent levels, a sports car, a jet via added wings, jetski, helicopter and Formula One racing car can all be driven, as seen in the game's title screen. All of the vehicles are armed to deal with enemy vehicles and gun emplacements. The helicopter levels play as a vertically scrolling shooter.

== Release ==
In 2022, the arcade version was included as part of the Sega Astro City Mini V, a vertically oriented variant of the Sega Astro City mini console.

== Reception ==
In Japan, Game Machine listed Action Fighter as the 12th most successful table arcade unit of October 1986.

Computer and Video Games magazine reviewed the Master System version in 1989, giving it an 89% score.
