= Buggy Run =

1994 video game

- Developer: SIMS
- Publisher: Sega
- Platform: Master System
- Release: PAL: March 10, 1994
- Genre: Racing
- Modes: Single-player, multiplayer

Buggy Run is a 1994 racing game developed by SIMS and published by Sega for the Master System.

== Gameplay ==
In the single player mode, the player races other opponents on a large racing track displayed in a pseudo-3D angle. Before starting the race, the player goes to a garage to purchase parts needed to upgrade the car. The object is to beat everyone else by crossing the finish line first. The prize money the player wins will help fund additional car parts for the next race. In the two player mode, the player races the opposing player on a small racing track displayed in a top-down 2D angle. The rules for winning are almost the same, but players can battle each other while racing. Race tracks take place in four different types of environments including green, water, snow and magma zones.

== Reception ==
Reception

Review score
Publication	Score
Mean Machines Sega	60%
