= Alien Storm =

1990 video game

- Genesis cover art
- Developers: Sega (AM1) (arcade); Sega (Genesis); SIMS (Master System); Tiertex (home computers)
- Publishers: Sega; U.S. Gold (home computers)
- Composer: Keisuke Tsukahara
- Platforms: Arcade, Genesis, Master System, Amiga, Atari ST, Commodore 64, ZX Spectrum, Amstrad CPC, Virtual Console
- Release: Arcade: NA: April 1990; JP: May 1990; Mega Drive/Genesis: JP: June 28, 1991; NA: July 1991; EU: 1991; Master System: EU: December 1991
- Genres: Beat 'em up, shooter
- Modes: Single-player, multiplayer

Alien Storm (エイリアンストーム) is a beat 'em up shooter released as an arcade video game by Sega in 1990. It was ported to the Genesis/Mega Drive and Master System. The Mega Drive version was re-released on Wii's Virtual Console in 2007 and was also included on Sonic's Ultimate Genesis Collection for Xbox 360 and PlayStation 3. The game was also re-released on the Nintendo Classics service in 2022.

== Plot ==
A homicidal alien race is invading Earth, and the only thing that stands between them and world domination are a special forces team known as the "Alien Busters", composed of Karen (absent in the Master System version, named "Karla" in some versions), Garth (named "Gordon" in some versions) and Scooter (the robot, named "Slammer" in Master System and PAL versions).

== Gameplay ==
Alien Storm is a side-scrolling beat 'em up. The game resembles Golden Axe, with a similar artistic style, three playable characters (a man, a woman, and a novelty character) and pick-up or power-up special attacks. The player (one player only on the Master System version, up to two players on the Mega Drive version, three on the arcade version) selects from the three different characters to embark upon a quest to save the Earth from an alien invasion.

All of the Busters are playable from the beginning of the game. There are six missions to complete (eight in the Mega Drive version) with several stages, and each mission has the player blasting aliens, from the streets to the mother ship, where the mother of all aliens can be found. This task becomes increasingly difficult with each new mission, and the aliens are capable of hiding inside objects such as plants, post boxes, trash cans, drums, and other items. Each mission has an objective such as rescuing people or destroying a UFO.

After defeating certain aliens, flying skulls will appear, which can be shot to collect life or energy. Energy is used specifically to power the energy-based attacks of the player's weapon (such as flames or electricity) and to use the much more powerful special weapons.

In a similar format as other early Sega arcade games, each character has unlimited usage of various short-range attacks, i.e. punches, kicks. Along with these standard attacks, each character has their own individual weapon (Garth's weapon that shoots lightning is replaced with a flame weapon in the Master System version). Special attacks are also included, and vary depending on the character chosen at the start of the game. For instance, Garth summons a U.S. Air Force starship that drops bombs across the street (in the Master System version he has Karen's special, a ballistic missile strike). Scooter will teleport out of his present location and leave a series of bombs that will blow up on the appearance of aliens, after which he will re-appear (in the Mega Drive and arcade versions he just explodes, leaving his head, which his new body returns to retrieve). Karen calls down a nuclear missile, which incinerates every foe on the screen. However, a large amount of energy is depleted by using each character's special attack, and cannot be used if the energy of the player's character is too low.

There are few bosses in the game. The arcade original features an alien spaceship, an alien brain and a single boss in the middle of the game that has three distinct forms. This boss is repeated as a common enemy near the end of the last mission. The Mega Drive port has two of these forms as three separate bosses. At the end of each mission, the side-scrolling gameplay shifts to either a shooting gallery perspective where the player must take out the aliens that pop out of various locations, similar to the bonus stages of Shinobi and Shadow Dancer, both by Sega, or a running section that is similar to the side-scrolling mode but plays like a horizontal shooter instead with projectile weapons.

== Cancelled Atari Jaguar version ==
In October 1993, Atari Corporation filed a lawsuit against Sega for an alleged infringement of a patent originally created by Atari Corp. in the 1980s, and Atari sought a preliminary injunction to stop manufacturing, usage, and sales of hardware and software for the Genesis and Game Gear. On September 28, 1994, both parties reached a settlement involving a cross-licensing agreement to publish up to five games each year across their systems until 2001. The Master System version is one of the first five games approved from the deal by Sega in order to be converted for the Atari Jaguar, but it was never released.

== Reception ==
Reception

Aggregate score
Aggregator	Score	
Aggregator	Master System	Sega Genesis
GameRankings		61% (5 retrospective reviews)

Review scores
Publication	Score	
Publication	Master System	Sega Genesis
Console XS	80%	78%
Famicom Tsūshin		8/10, 7/10, 8/10, 6/10
Sega Master Force	77%	
Sega-16		7/10
MegaTech		78%
Mega Play		7/10, 5/10, 7/10, 6/10

In Japan, Game Machine listed Alien Storm on their June 15, 1990 issue as being the most-successful table arcade unit of the month. MegaTech reviewed the Sega Genesis version and gave an overall score of 78%, they praised the game for being an outstanding conversion of the arcade version and praised the graphics and saying the gameplay is highly enjoyable. The only criticism they had was the game being too easy. Mega Play's four reviewers gave above average reviews and praising the game’s graphics, animation and felt the game was a near perfect port from the arcade version, despite being similar to Golden Axe. The criticism they had was with the gameplay being too easy and repetitive.

In 2023, Time Extension included the arcade version on their top 25 "Best Beat 'Em Ups of All Time" list.
