= Tecmo World Cup '93 =

1993 video game

- Developer: SIMS
- Publisher: Sega
- Platform: Master System
- Release: EU: April 1993
- Genre: Sports
- Modes: Single-player, multiplayer

Tecmo World Cup '93 is a soccer video game released in 1993 by Sega for the Master System. The game is a continuation of previous Tecmo football games such as Tecmo World Cup '90 and Tecmo World Cup '92.

== Gameplay ==
The game replicates matches of football with the option of 45, 30 or 15 minutes per half. In multiplayer two human players can play each other. Single player has a world cup tournament consisting of a group stage, second round, quarter finals, semi finals and final.

The player can select one from twenty-four available national teams.
