= Cloud Master =

1988 video game

- Developers: Hot-B (Arcade); Opera House (Master System, MSX2); Disco (FC); SPS Co (X68000)
- Publishers: Taito (Arcade, FC, PCE); Sega (Master System); Sharp (X68000); Hot-B (MSX2)
- Designer: Yukio Abe Fujiwara Eihiro
- Programmer: Funky George (Famicom)
- Artist: Nekoto Jr (Famicom)
- Composer: Planet2, Soul Duke (Famicom)
- Platforms: Arcade, MSX2, PC Engine, Famicom, Master System, X68000
- Release: July 1988: Arcade; JP: July 1988; MSX2; JP: December 1, 1988; Master System; NA: August 1989; PAL: 1989; Famicom; JP: September 22, 1989; X68000; JP: January 25, 1991; PC Engine; JP: March 13, 1992
- Genre: Scrolling shooter
- Modes: Single-player, multiplayer

Cloud Master (中華大仙, Chūka Taisen) is a horizontally scrolling shooter released as an arcade video game by Taito in 1988. Home versions were released for the Master System, PC Engine, and Famicom and, excluding the Master System version, were released only in Japan. The PC Engine version of the game is titled Gokuraku! Chūka Taisen (極楽!中華大仙). The Famicom version is titled Chūka Taisen.

== Gameplay ==
Arcade version screenshot

The player controls Mike Chen floating on a cloud, maneuvering around the screen and shooting balls of energy at flying enemies. Powerups can be collected for stronger and faster firepower. Some parts of the stages have doors that give the player the opportunity to buy special bomb types with collectible credits. Each stage has its own mini-boss and main boss. The player restarts at certain checkpoints after losing a life.

== Reception ==
In Japan, Game Machine listed Cloud Master on their August 15, 1988 issue as being the sixteenth most-successful table arcade unit of the month.

== Legacy ==
In 2008, Starfish SD, a company founded by former Hot-B employees, bought the rights from Taito and developed a remake for the Nintendo Wii. It was released under the title The Monkey King: The Legend Begins (Shin Chūka Taisen: Michael to Meimei no Bōken in Japan). A Nintendo Switch port, titled Chuka Taisen, was released on September 6, 2018.
