= TransBot =

1985 video game

- Developer: Sega
- Publisher: Sega
- Platform: Master System
- Release: JP: December 22, 1985; NA: October 1986; EU: August 1987
- Genre: Shoot 'em up
- Mode: Single-player

TransBot, known in Japan as Astro Flash (アストロフラッシュ), is a video game for the Master System originally released in 1985. It is a sci-fi-themed shoot 'em up inspired by Transformers.

== Plot ==
Back in the solar year 2000 there was a nuclear war, and people are finally now emerging from underground to build a new society. But something is still wrong. DALAUS, a leftover computer from the old world is creating its own empire, and it is up to the player to stop it.

== Gameplay ==
TransBot is a side scrolling shooter for one or two players, with players piloting the CA-214, a starfighter that can transform into a robot, the TransBot. The game features only two levels and beating the boss loops the game back to the first one, thus this is a never-ending game; it is impossible to finish.

The CA-214 features a number of weapons. Players start out with a basic, default gun, but after collecting a ? symbol they can choose a new weapon to use. There are six choices which will scroll past at the top of the screen, and the TransBot will be powered with whatever selection they make. Powered up weapons will only last until all the ammo is exhausted, which will cause TransBot to revert to the basic weapon.

== HD Remake ==
In 2018, retro video gaming website RetroGameGeeks.co.uk published an unofficial fan-remake built with Unity (game engine) by Kristian 'CVGZ' Hawkinson. It is available as a free to play release.
