= Scramble Spirits =

1988 video game

- Arcade flyer (Japan)
- Developers: Sega; Sega/Arc System Works (SMS)
- Publisher: Sega
- Designer: Hoko Chan
- Programmers: Night Emperor; Mam; Issei Kun
- Artists: Ojisama; Panda; Nosa
- Composers: Tohru Nakabayashi; Yasuhiro Kawakami
- Platforms: Arcade, Amiga, Amstrad CPC, Atari ST, Commodore 64, Master System, ZX Spectrum
- Release: July 29, 1988
- Genre: Scrolling shooter
- Modes: Single-player, multiplayer
- Arcade system: Sega System 24

Scramble Spirits (Note: Japanese: スクランブルスピリッツ, Hepburn: Sukuranburu Supirittsu) is a vertically scrolling shooter game released for the arcades by Sega in 1988. It was ported to the Master System the following year in 1989, then to personal computers in 1990.

== Gameplay ==
The player starts out with a propelled plane that can fire air-to-air twin machine guns and air-to-ground rockets. These weapons are used for destroying waves of enemy planes and ground and sea units. The main plane is destroyed by one hit. If a certain enemy is destroyed the player can collect a comrade fighter to fight alongside the main plane. Up to two comrade fighters can be collected. The comrade fighters can be assigned to fight in the air to fire bullets or they can be assigned to fight at low altitude to fire air-to-ground rockets. The comrade fighters can also be launched to do a kamikaze attack explosion against the enemy. After kamikaze attacks, the comrade fighters are retrievable, but they are lost if they are shot or crash into an enemy. In some areas of certain stages, the player will fly at a lower altitude armed with only twin machine guns and shooting down parked planes and turrets and can take a limited amount of damage from multiple shots and crashes. At the end of each stage, the player must destroy a boss vehicle to proceed.

== Plot ==
At the beginning of 21st century, the world was ravaged by a global nuclear war. Miraculously, humanity survived the devastation and partially rebuilt civilization. The world order had been restructured as a unitary system; a central supreme government with smaller rebuilt regions of continents as its states. Then one day, an urgent news reached the headquarter of the central supreme government that its smaller states came under fierce assaults and were occupied by mysterious enemy militaries. The Group One, an elite air force squad under the central supreme government's command, dispatches two of their ace pilots to destroy the mysterious enemy.

== Reception ==
In Japan, Game Machine listed Scramble Spirits on their November 15, 1988 issue as being the second most-successful table arcade unit of the month.
