= 20 em 1 =

1995 video game

- Developer(s): Tec Toy
- Publisher(s): Tec Toy
- Platform(s): Master System
- Release: BRA: 1995
- Genre(s): Compilation
- Mode(s): Single-player

20 em 1 (English translation: 20 in 1) is a compilation game from Brazilian toy and electronics company Tec Toy that allows players to choose from 20 different games. The title was exclusively released in Brazil as a pack-in game included with later revisions of the Master System.

== Gameplay ==
Many of the included games belong to the action game genre while others are racing or sports games involving skateboarding, motocross racing, car racing/driving, roller skating, and skiing. Trophies are earned for beating each of the 20 games that are included in this compilation. The game's text is in the Brazilian Portuguese language.
