= Bomber Raid =

1989 video game

- North American box art
- Developer: Sanritsu
- Publishers: WW: Sega; NA: Activision
- Artist: Hide Itoen
- Platform: Master System
- Release: NA: January 1989; JP: February 4, 1989; EU: June 1989
- Genre: Scrolling shooter
- Mode: Single-player

Bomber Raid (ボンバーレイド) is a 1989 vertically scrolling shooter released for the Master System.

== Gameplay ==
In Bomber Raid, the player controls a small "Freedom Fighter" aircraft able to fire different types of projectiles through five levels.

The player starts with three lives and a limited number of cluster bombs. Any collision with either an enemy aircraft or enemy fire results in the loss of a life. One type of enemy, a strange disk like object with a green and red flashing center, drops a powerup when destroyed. Power-ups, which can be a weapon power-up (P) which replace the standard twin cannon, speed power up (S) or provide the player with a comrade fighter plane in one out four formations (depending on the number of the power up) to assist in destroying enemies. Cluster bombs, will clear the screen of many enemies (except bosses). The cluster bomb's explosion is intensified by the number of comrade fighters and their formations. Power pods give extra points, weapon power-ups, and a temporary backup fighter.
