= Bank Panic =

1984 video game

- North American arcade flyer
- Developer: Sanritsu Denki
- Publishers: Arcade: JP/EU: Sega; NA: Bally Midway; MSX; Pony Canyon
- Platforms: Arcade, SG-1000, MSX, Master System
- Release: October 1984: Arcade; JP: October 1984; NA: November 1984; EU: Early 1985 SG-1000; JP: September 1985 MSX; JP: May 1986 Master System; EU: 1987
- Genre: Shooter
- Modes: Single-player, multiplayer

Bank Panic is a 1984 shooter game developed by Sanritsu Denki and published by Sega for Japanese and European arcades; in North America, it was distributed by Bally Midway. The player assumes the role of an Old West sheriff who must protect a bank and its customers from masked robbers.

== Gameplay ==
The cowboy in the left door is making a deposit, while the masked cowboy on the right is about to rob the bank.

Controls consist of a two-position joystick and three buttons to fire at the left, center, and right positions. The layout of the bank is implicitly a circle with twelve numbered doors and the player in the center. The player can rotate to the left or right using the joystick, viewing three doors at a time, and shoot at a door by pressing the button corresponding to its position. The doors will open to reveal one of the following:

- A customer, who will make a deposit by dropping a bag of money onto the counter.
- A robber, who will attempt to shoot the player.
- A young boy wearing a stack of hats, which the player can rapidly shoot to gain a deposit or bonus time.

The level ends once every door has received at least one deposit. If a customer makes a deposit at a door where a bank teller is sitting, the player earns bonus points.

The status of each door is indicated by a row of numbered boxes across the top of the screen, with a red dollar sign representing a door that has a completed deposit. A bar gauge above each box shows how close a person is to reaching that door. The disappearance of a dollar sign indicates that a robber has just stolen a deposit; the player must then turn to that door and shoot the robber to recover it.

At random intervals, a bomb will be placed on one of the doors and a rapid timer will count down from 99. The player must move to that door and destroy the bomb with gunfire. Shooting a customer, being shot by a robber, failing to destroy a bomb, or failing to complete the level before the overall timer runs out (shown by a bar at the bottom of the screen) costs the player one life.

Some robbers will wear white boots; these robbers need to be shot twice to be eliminated. At times, a robber may push a customer aside or duck out of view to avoid the player's gunfire, or a door may open to reveal a customer tied up with rope. In the latter case, the player has a short time to fire one shot and free the customer, who will then make three deposits instead of one; if the player waits too long, a robber pushes the customer aside.

Shortly after a robber appears in a doorway, a timer is shown above his head and begins to count quickly up to 0:30 and back down to 0:00, leading to a "FAIR" kill if he is shot during this period. Higher point values are awarded for shooting when the timer is closer to 0:00, but any shot fired before the timer appears leads to an "UNFAIR" kill and a minimum value. At the end of a level, the player earns bonus points for all deposits made and any remaining time, and a further bonus based on the average time of all FAIR kills made during the level.

Each time the player shoots a red-shirted robber when the timer displays 0:00, one letter in the word EXTRA is awarded, shown at the bottom of the screen. Completing the word awards a large bonus and an extra life and immediately advances the player to the next level.

== Reception ==
In Japan, Game Machine listed Bank Panic as the second most successful table arcade unit of October 1984.

Computer and Video Games magazine gave the arcade version of Bank Panic a positive review, calling it a well-designed game. They later noted the game is similar to Nintendo's Hogan's Alley, which was released in the same year. Computer Gamer magazine wrote that the "colourful and humurous [sic] graphics make this an enjoyable, if simple in concept, game".

== Legacy ==
West Bank is a clone from Dinamic Software for the ZX Spectrum, Commodore 64, MSX and Amstrad CPC. A clone for Atari 8-bit computers was released in 1992 as Bang! Bank!
