= Kenseiden =

1988 video game

- North American and European box art
- Developer: Sega
- Publisher: Sega
- Platform: Master System
- Release: JP: June 2, 1988; NA: October 1988; EU: November 1988
- Genres: Action, platform
- Mode: Single-player

Kenseiden (Note: Japanese: 剣聖伝) (Note: The title can be roughly translated as Sword Saint Legend, Legend of the Swordmaster or Summoning of the Sacred Sword.) is a 1988 action-platform video game developed and published by Sega for the Master System. The player controls the samurai Hayato in 16th century Japan as they attempt to retrieve five scrolls and a sacred sword from evil warlocks and spirits led by Oda Nobunaga.

The game was released as Sword of the Hwarang (Note: Hangeul: 화랑의 검, Korean language: Hwarang-ui Geom) in South Korea with multiple visual differences. Hayato is altered to look like a Hwarang warrior and the levels are changed to be set in Korea.

Kenseiden received positive reviews from critics.

== Gameplay ==
Kenseiden features a cameo of Alex Kidd in this level. Alex Kidd's face is in the lower-right corner of the screen.

Kenseidan is a side-scrolling action-adventure game set in Japan. Each level is set in an ancient Japanese province where the player is tasked. After A certain point, the player can play levels in whatever order they choose, and can go back to previous levels at anytime except for the final level.

== Reception ==
Kenseiden

Review scores
Publication	Score
Computer and Video Games	85%
IGN	7/10
The Games Machine	86%

Upon release, Kenseiden received positive reviews

The Games Machine gave the game an 86% score, considering it one of the best "hack-'n-slay" games because of its "simple, but highly playable action and superb presentation." Computer and Video Games gave it an 85% score, describing it as a "huge" role-playing adventure with exploration, "truly superb" still screens and "plenty of brain-bending puzzles" to last "weeks on end!"

Retrospectively, Levi Buchanan of IGN reviewed Kenseiden. He gave the game a 7.0 and said "even though I found the choice to go grim interesting and the visuals engaging, I have discovered my appreciation for Kenseiden was more of a 'love the one your [sic] with' sentiment. Master System junkies should still seek it out and give it a go, but there are indeed better games for the console that deserve your renewed attention."
