= Putt & Putter =

1991 video game

Putt & Putter Mini-Golf
- Developer: SIMS
- Publisher: Sega
- Designers: Lehto; Matsu Tokujoh
- Composer: Yoko Wada
- Platforms: Master System, Game Gear
- Release: Master System: EU: June 1992; Game Gear: EU: 1991; NA: 1991; BRA: 1991; JP: September 27, 1991
- Genre: Sports
- Modes: Single-player, multiplayer

Putt & Putter is a miniature golf video game released for the Master System in June 1992 and Game Gear in December 1991. It was developed by SIMS Co, and published by Sega. In Brazil the game was called Mini-Golf. The back of the box describes it as a cross between mini-golf and pinball.

== Gameplay ==
A hole during play

There are 18 holes in the game that increase in difficulty as the player progresses. Holes all have various obstacles that must be negotiated including sand traps, moving platforms and pinball style bumpers Almost all holes are surrounded by water and shots ending up off the course are given a one-stroke penalty. The holes are viewed from an isometric viewpoint. Shots are taken by using the directional pad to line up the shot and pressing a button on the control pad to start the power gauge, pressing it again selects the desired power. The 18 holes are split down into three groups of six holes, the player must finish each set either in par or under-par to move on to the next set.

A two-player mode takes the form of two balls in play simultaneously. Unlike in full scale golf it is possible for one ball to hit the other without a penalty being incurred. This adds a strategic element to the multiplayer game.

== Reception ==
Game gear cover art

Issue 34 of Games-X magazine (December 1991) gave the Game Gear version a 3 out of 5.

In January 1992, Power Play magazine gave the game a score of 57/100.

Sega Power magazine gave the game a score of 81/100 praising the gameplay especially the 2 player mode stating “Great fun for 2 players, this is one of those games that look awful, feels dated but has better gameplay then many other more hi-profile titles around at the mo.”
