= Alien Syndrome =

1987 video game

- European arcade flyer
- Developer: Sega R&D1 (Note: Master System and NES versions developed by Sanritsu; Amiga, Atari ST, Commodore 64 and ZX Spectrum versions developed by Softek International; Amstrad CPC version developed by Animagic; MSX version developed by Xortrapa Soft; X68000 version developed by Dempa Micomsoft.)
- Publishers: Sega: Amiga, Atari ST, C64; EU: ACE Software; NA: Sega NES; JP: Sunsoft; NA: Tengen CPC, ZX Spectrum ACE Software MSX DROsoft Game Gear; JP: SIMS; EU: Sega X68000 Dempa Micomsoft
- Composers: Tohru Nakabayashi: Amiga; David Whittaker; NES; Noboru Machida
- Platform: Arcade: Master System, Commodore 64, ZX Spectrum, NES, Amiga, Amstrad CPC, Atari ST, MSX, MS-DOS, X68000
- Release: April 1987: Arcade; JP: April 1987; NA: June 1987 Master System; JP: 18 October 1987; NA/PAL: March 1988 C64; UK: January 1988; NA: December 1988 ZX Spectrum; UK: May 1988 NES; JP: 2 December 1988; NA: December 1989 Amiga, Atari ST; EU: 1988; NA: January 1989 CPC, MSX; EU: 1988 MS-DOS December 1989 Game Gear; JP: 19 March 1992; EU: 3 December 1992 X68000; JP: 25 March 1992
- Genre: Run and gun
- Modes: Single-player, multiplayer
- Arcade system: Sega Pre System 16, Sega System 16B

Alien Syndrome (エイリアンシンドローム, Eirian Shindorōmu) is a 1987 run and gun video game developed and published by Sega for arcades. The game utilizes a side-scrolling feature that allows the player to take control of either a male (Ricky) or female (Mary) soldier whilst hunting aliens and saving hostages before they run out of time.

Alien Syndrome was released to commercial success and positive reviews, with praise towards its gameplay, character designs, sound design and horror themes. It was ported to various home computers and consoles, including Sega's own Master System, becoming one of the best-selling titles for that console. It was included as a bonus title in the 2009 compilation Sonic's Ultimate Genesis Collection.

== Gameplay ==
An example of gameplay during the first level, "Round 1". The player is taking control of Ricky whilst fighting alien worms.

Two players control two soldiers, named Ricky and Mary, who fight through large eight-way scrolling levels while rescuing their comrades that are being held by aliens. At the start of each level, a time bomb is set onboard the infested ship and the players must complete their task before it runs out which will result in the ship being destroyed. After they have rescued a certain number of hostages, the exit opens and they can pass through it in order to fight the end-of-level guardian. If the guardian is defeated before the time runs out, the players are then able to move onto the next stage. Once all seven levels are completed, the game starts over with more aggressive aliens, and less time on the clock.

== Ports ==
In 1988, the game was ported to the Master System, MSX, Amiga, Atari ST, Amstrad CPC, Commodore 64, and Famicom/Nintendo Entertainment System (published in North America by Tengen without a Nintendo license). Later, the game was ported to the ZX Spectrum (1989), and X68000 (1992).

== Reception ==
Reception

Review scores
Publication	Score
Dragon	2/5 (Master System)
Computer Entertainer	6.5/8 (C64)
Console XS	85% (Master System)
Sega Pro	85% (Master System)

Award
Publication	Award
Crash	Crash Smash

In Japan, Game Machine listed Alien Syndrome as the third most successful table arcade unit of April 1987. The original arcade version of the game was reviewed in the July 1987 issue of Computer and Video Games, where Clare Edgeley described it as "one of the most gripping games" she "played in months", praising the Aliens-like horror atmosphere, chilling sounds, special effects, graphics and gameplay. She stated it was "the first time the atmosphere and sheer addictiveness of a shoot 'em up has transported me to another planet," and concluded that it "is fantastic".

The Master System version of the game was reviewed in Console XS magazine, which gave it an 85% score. It was reviewed in 1989 in Dragon, which rated it two out of five stars.

== Legacy ==
The game was also converted to polygonal graphics for the PlayStation 2 as part of the Sega Ages re-release program and included in the US version of the Sega Classics Collection (it was removed from the European version to receive a lower age certificate). This version adds twin-stick shooter controls that use both analog sticks. The original arcade game was also included as an unlockable in Sonic's Ultimate Genesis Collection.

The game was followed by two sequels with the same name; Alien Syndrome on the Game Gear and Alien Syndrome (2007 video game) on the Playstation Portable and Wii.
