= Lord of the Sword =

1988 video game

- North American and European box art
- Developer: Sega
- Publisher: Sega
- Director: Mutsuhiro Fuji
- Platform: Master System
- Release: JP: June 2, 1988; EU: 1988; NA: March 1989
- Genre: Action-adventure
- Mode: Single-player

Lord of the Sword (Note: Known in Japan as Lord of Sword (Japanese: ロード オブ ソード, Hepburn: Rōdo obu Sōdo)) is a 1988 action-adventure game developed and published by Sega for the Master System. The player controls Landau, A wannabe hero attempting to save the land of Baljinya from the demonic forces of Ra Goan. The game sees the player traversing the side-scrolling open world, fighting monsters and bosses they come across, and talking to NPC's in towns in order to progress to new areas of the world.

The game received mixed reviews from critics.

== Gameplay ==
Landau is armed with a sword for close combat, and a bow for ranged combat. The Kingdom of Baljinya has towns and villages where Landau can stop to rest (restoring his health) and gather information from the people. There are also castles which can only be entered after completing certain tasks. Each time the player has the opportunity to speak with a character, he should do so several times in succession in order to get all possible messages. If the player fails to do this, bosses and secret paths will not appear. There are different types of terrain between the villages, towns and castles. Flat lands, dark forests, mountains and swamps make up the rest of the landscape.

The terrains are plagued by different kinds of monsters, some specific to each terrain. The player will have up to ten continues to complete the quests. The game features no password based save feature. When faced with a boss monster, the player will need to hit its weak point or attack at its weak moment. When a boss monster is destroyed, Landau is rewarded with a better sword or better bow which deals more damage.

== Plot ==
Followers of the Demon Lord Ra Goan kill the king and royal family of Baljinya in an attempt at resurrecting Ra from his one thousand year imprisonment. The Elder Council of Baljinya meets to discuss these recent events and come to the conclusion that a new king must be crowned, otherwise the kingdom will fall under the rule of Ra Goan when he is resurrected. The council decide that the rightful ruler will be A strong, brave man that manages to complete three tasks. Landau, a wannabe hero seeking the crown, accepts the tasks and sets out to save his homeland.

At the end of the game, Landau manages to become the new king. Five years later it is shown that Landau is ushering in a new era of peace and prosperity for Baljinya

== Reception ==
Reception

Review scores
| Publication | Score |
|---|---|
| AllGame | 2/5 |
| Computer and Video Games | 64% |
| The Games Machine (UK) | 58% |
| Console XS | 85% |

Lord of the Sword received mixed reviews from critics. Computer and Video Games gave it a 64% score.

The Games Machine gave the game a 58% score, remarking how the game's difficulty would have been nearly impossible if it weren't for the continue feature and that the gameplay itself was uninteresting. They also noted that the graphics, while somewhat appealing, didn't stand out compared to other games from the time.

AllGame gave it an overall rating of 2 stars out of a possible 5.
