= Kung Fu Kid =

1987 video game

- Developer: Sega
- Publisher: Sega
- Platform: Master System
- Release: JP: May 17, 1987; NA: October 1987; EU: January 1988
- Genre: Beat 'em up
- Mode: Single-player

Kung Fu Kid, known in Japan as Makai Retsuden (魔界列伝), is a 1987 beat 'em up video game developed and published by Sega for the Master System. It is the follow-up to Dragon Wang for the SG-1000.

== Gameplay ==
Players control Wang as he faces an onslaught of enemies using his martial arts skills and wall jumping technique.

== Reception ==
Computer Gaming World criticized Kung Fu Kid's "incredibly contrived play-mechanics" (including a lobster that would give the player extra powers) and the "tiny and cartoon-like" graphics, and mocked the Engrish documentation that stated that the player would fight "the unnaturally evil one".
