= Gain Ground =

1988 video game

- North American promotional sales flyer, highlighting the game's playable characters and its Sega System 24 arcade board
- Developers: Sega; Sanritsu (Genesis, Master System)
- Publishers: Sega; Renovation Products (Genesis)
- Platforms: Arcade, Master System, Mega Drive/Genesis, TurboGrafx-CD
- Release: Arcade: JP: November 1988; WW: Late 1988; Master System: PAL: January 1991; Mega Drive/Genesis: JP: January 3, 1991; WW: 1991
- Genres: Action, strategy
- Modes: Single-player, multiplayer
- Arcade system: Sega System 24

Gain Ground (Note: Japanese: ゲイングランド, Hepburn: Gein Gurando) is a 1988 action arcade video game developed and published by Sega. It is set within a supercomputer's simulation of war, and follows up to three players traversing through a series of forty levels themed after select periods of human history. The goal of each level, depending on the player's choice, is either to guide at least one player character safely to an exit point or to destroy all enemies, either of which must be completed within a time limit.

It was later ported to the Master System, Mega Drive/Genesis, and TurboGrafx-CD.

== Gameplay ==
Arcade version screenshot

In Gain Ground, the gameplay and mechanics are similar to both Berzerk (1980) and Gauntlet (1985).

Where two (or three) players control one of a set of up to 20 recruitable warriors at a time, each with different weapons. To beat a level, players must reach the exit point with at least one character or destroy all enemies on the level before time runs out. There are forty levels in the arcade version of the game. The Master System and the Genesis/Mega Drive have fifty levels in the game.

Normal mode starts with three players. There are captive characters littered across all levels, which can be rescued by walking over, then escorting the controlled character to the exit point. If a player controlled character is killed, that character turns into a captive, except that they will disappear if the next active player controlled character dies, exits the level without them, or the player has no characters left in their party. In Hard mode, the player starts the game with all twenty characters, but all the captive characters are removed from the levels.

The game is over when all controlled characters in the party are killed without any reaching the exit, but there are three continues which allow a player to restart the level with their original three characters.

The game consists out of four rounds, each having ten stages, where the tenth stage is a boss level. There are also ten completely new levels added to the Genesis/Mega Drive version, this Modern Epoch takes place in the streets of the city. The Master System version also has 10 newly themed levels, placed after other versions' final round "Future", ostensibly taking place within the "Gain Ground Main System" itself according to its opening stage.

== Plot ==
From a Gain Ground flyer:

A long period of peace has deprived the earthlings of their instinct to wage war. The Federated Government, greatly concerned regarding this ever increasing dangerous situation, developed a Gain Ground simulation system in the year 2348 in an effort to instigate their ever waning fighting spirit. However, suddenly without warning, the Supercomputer went berserk and took many of the citizens as hostages. In order to rescue the POWs, three of the bravest warriors were urgently dispatched to go forth into the deadly Gain Ground.

== Release ==
Gain Ground started off as an arcade game. Released in Japan, the United States and Canada in 1988, Gain Ground ran on the Sega System 24 architecture. The developers have stated that their original inspiration was Gauntlet. Gain Ground was ported to the Sega Master System and the Sega Mega Drive/Genesis in 1991. Renovation Products released the Genesis version in North America. Both conversions were handled by Sanritsu. In 1992, a PC Engine Super CD-ROM² version (Gain Ground SX) was released by NEC Avenue.

It was re-released in Radica Games' TVPlay Legends Vol. II TV Games compilation. In 2004, the game was remade for the PlayStation 2 as part of Sega's Japan-only Sega Ages 2500 series as Sega Ages 2500 Series Vol. 9: Gain Ground. This version has additional new levels that must be unlocked, with new music to accompany them. The Mega Drive/Genesis version was released on the European, Australian, and American Wii Virtual Console in February 2007. Gain Ground was included in Sega Genesis Collection on the PlayStation 2 and the PSP in 2006 and in Sonic's Ultimate Genesis Collection for Xbox 360 and PlayStation 3 in 2009. In June 2010, the game became available on Steam as part of Sega Mega Drive Classics Pack (Sega Genesis Classics in the United States). It was included in the console version of the Mega Drive/Genesis Classics Pack in May 2018.

As a tribute to the game, Chapter 15 and 17 of the crossover game Project X Zone are stages directly pulled from Gain Ground. Chapter 15's title is "Gain Ground System" and both stages even have the party rescuing three of their companions (two in the first and one in the second) in true fashion to the original game. Incidentally, no characters from Gain Ground actually appear in the crossover.

== Reception ==
Reception

Review scores
Publication	Score	
Publication	Master System	Sega Genesis
Famitsu		6/10, 7/10, 7/10, 7/10
IGN		7.5/10
Raze	71%	92%
Console XS	82%	
MegaTech		43%
Sega-16		10/10
Sega Pro	81%	89%

Game Machine reports that Gain Ground was among the most popular arcade games of February 1989.

IGN's Levi Buchanan ranked Gain Ground as the fifth top Renovation game. Complex ranked Gain Ground 88th on their "The 100 Best Sega Genesis Games" list.
