= Golfamania =

1990 video game

- European cover art
- Developer: Sanritsu
- Publisher: Sega
- Designer: Shisho Deshi
- Platform: Master System
- Release: EU: 1990
- Genre: Sports
- Mode: Single-player

Golfamania is a sports video game published for the Master System by Sega in Europe. It includes a create-a-player mode. The cartridge contains battery-packed RAM to save progress.

== Gameplay ==
Experience points are gained by doing well in holes. Power, accuracy, and luck are the only stats that can be powered-up by the player. Each player starts out with an experience level of 0 and with zero experience points. Certain golfers in the game do resemble those from real life PGA Tour professionals from the 1980s like Greg Norman.

There is only one golf course; which has some island holes in addition to trees and bunkers. A fanfare is performed when a player performs at par or better; the only other music track other than the title screen music. There is a digitized sound clip when a drive is delivered in a perfect fashion. Some of the holes have special awards where bonus amounts of experience points can be earned by either having the longest drive or achieving a hole in one.

The main menu allows players to choose between a practice session, a match play game, a stroke play match, and a pro tournament. In the pro tournament, the player can ask for advice on the best way to deal with an individual hole.

== Reception ==
British magazine Computer and Video Games gave Golfamania an overall score of 89%. Console XS gave it an 82% score. Commodore Power Play gave the game a rating of 71%.
