= Ghost House (video game) =

1986 video game

- Developer: Sega
- Publisher: Sega
- Composer: Hiroshi Kawaguchi
- Platform: Master System
- Release: JP: April 21, 1986; NA: September 1986; EU: August 1987
- Genre: Platform
- Mode: Single-player

Ghost House (Japanese: ゴーストハウス, Hepburn: Gōsuto Hausu) is a side-scrolling platform game developed and published by Sega, released for the Master System in 1986. Ghost House is loosely based on Sega's 1982 arcade video game, Monster Bash. The game was originally released in the Sega Card format, then re-released on cartridge.

== Plot ==
The player controls Mick/Mickey, a young vampire hunter out to destroy five vampires (or "Draculas" as the instruction book calls them) in each stage before proceeding to the next. In later levels Draculas may re-spawn.

Everything is out to stop Mick/Mickey from completing this task and making his way out of the mansion. The player has to punch or jump on enemies to defeat them. Arrows fly from either direction after Mick/Mickey passes a fireplace and will attempt to hit him, and he must either duck or jump on them for extra points and eventually gain invincibility as per the amount jumped on (25). Players can jump to touch lights to freeze everything on screen for a few seconds. Rather than punching, the player can collect a knife on any level by jumping on a candelabra as it flies past. Exploiting the game's backgrounds and tricks provide for an elaborated experience as well as facilitating the expulsions of all the Draculas. The knife is useful when the player fights a Dracula or needs to get rid of Fire Blowers and Mummies.

The player starts the game with three lives, and receives an additional life every 50,000 and 150,000 points. There is also an energy meter. The player loses energy after touching monsters, which leads to losing a life. The player can gain energy by collecting treasures scattered throughout the mansion, and it is restored when a Dracula is killed.

== Release ==
Ghost House was released in Brazil as Chapolim X Dracula: Um Duelo Assustador (the subtitle translates as "A Spooky Duel") by Tectoy. Mick is replaced by El Chapulín Colorado (The Red Grasshopper).
