= Aerial Assault =

1990 video game

- Sega Master System cover art
- Developer(s): Sanritsu
- Publisher(s): Sega
- Platform(s): Master System, Game Gear
- Release: Master System: NA: July 1990; EU: 1990; Game Gear: NA: 1992; EU: 1992; JP: June 5, 1992
- Genre(s): Scrolling shooter
- Mode(s): Single-player

Aerial Assault is a side-scrolling shooter video game published by Sega for the Master System in 1990 and Game Gear in 1992.

== Gameplay ==
The player takes the role of a Freedom Fighter who must destroy five targets, including the Vinsk (a flying battleship in the Game Gear version, an ordinary ship in the Master System), the CB-53 Bomber, "El", and two cliff fortresses. During each of the five missions, the player encounters enemy jets, choppers, submarines, jeeps, parachute bombs, and several other enemies which they must destroy. Shooting either the spinning fighters, the small flying helicopters, or the mines on the final mission will earn the player a power-up that allows them to upgrade or downgrade their firepower. There are three difficulty settings: "Easy", "Normal", and "Hard". Players will not be able to complete the game if they select the "Easy" setting.

== Plot ==
A militaristic organisation called the N.A.C. developed a huge laser emitter, "EL", which is capable of gradually destroying the ozone layer over the course of a decade or so. In the year 1999, the N.A.C. begins an all-out offensive against every country in the world. The nations' defense forces are overwhelmed by the sheer power and size of the enemy. The player controls the mysterious "Freedom Fighter", a pilot with no official connection to any government, who flies off to stop the N.A.C.

== Reception ==
The Master System version received positive reviews upon release. Computer and Video Games scored it 82% in 1990. Mean Machines Sega and S: The Sega Magazine also gave the Master System version 82% scores.

The four reviewers of Electronic Gaming Monthly gave the Game Gear version ratings of 4, 5, 5 and 5 out of 10. They described the gameplay as repetitive, uninteresting, and lacking in both intensity and challenge, though they said the graphics are decent.
