= ESWAT: City Under Siege =

1990 video game

- North American box art
- Developer: Sega (Note: Master System version developed by Sanritsu.)
- Publisher: Sega
- Designers: Nandemo; Macco Chan; Seishi Atsumiya; Mikarin
- Composers: Takayuki Nakamura; Y. Takada
- Platforms: Genesis/Mega Drive, Master System
- Release: Genesis/Mega Drive: JP: July 14, 1990; NA: October 1990; EU: 1990; Master System: NA: September 1990; EU: November 1990
- Genres: Action, platform
- Mode: Single-player

ESWAT: City Under Siege, released in Japan as Cyber Police ESWAT (サイバーポリス イースワット), is a 1990 action-platform video game developed and published by Sega for the Sega Genesis and Master System. It is based on the arcade game Cyber Police ESWAT, released a year earlier in 1989. The console game maintains the main characters, plot and some of its enemies from the arcade game, but features some different levels, weapons, and bonuses.

Backbone Entertainment pitched a new ESWAT game to Sega, but the project was never greenlit. Artwork and screenshots of the game were later leaked.

== Gameplay and plot ==
The game is a side-scrolling platformer similar to Shinobi. It is set in the near future, where the player controls police officer Duke Oda (デューク・オダ) over a series of levels before receiving an armored power suit. At first, as a rookie member of the Cyber Police force in the city of Liberty, Duke must clean the streets of an overwhelming crime wave and terminate the most wanted criminals. In the first and second levels of the game, Duke can only utilize a single shot weapon and can only survive one hit. A second hit will kill him.

A mysterious and high-tech terrorist organization, named "E.Y.E.", quickly threatens to take over the entire city. After being promoted at the end of the second level, Duke is given power armor called the "ICE Combat Suit". With this suit, the player can use new and more lethal weapons: "Super Shot", a plasma rifle, rockets, and a devastating fire attack if Duke finds them. The player also has access to a jet pack with limited fuel that replenishes over time. This armor also allows the player to take more damage before being defeated, but because the suit makes Duke larger, it is harder to dodge enemy attacks. The final boss of the game, the leader of E.Y.E., is revealed to be a robot with artificial intelligence that is attempting to replicate its own ICE Combat Suits to take over Liberty.

== Reception ==
Reception

Aggregate score
Aggregator	Score
GameRankings	68.33% (3 reviews)

Review scores
Publication	Score
AllGame	3.5/5
MegaTech	92%
Raze	72%
Mega Action	81%
Console XS	84%

Raze magazine gave ESWAT an overall review score of 72%, praising the variety of detailed backgrounds and voice recordings and describing the gameplay as "initially interesting and compelling"; however, they criticized the game being too easy and repetitive. Mega Action gave a review score of 81%, giving criticism for its "dated" graphics but praising the gameplay. Console XS gave a score of 84/100 and called the game "challenging" and "addictive". MegaTech called the game "a super slick shoot-'em-up that simply oozes quality". They praised the parallax scrolling backgrounds, sprites, and sound, and described the gameplay as "challenging and highly addictive".

In 1992, Mega placed the game at number 32 on their list of the "Top Mega Drive Games of All Time".

== Ports ==
The Master System port was released around the same time as the Genesis version in 1990. As the Genesis was now becoming a major contender in the US market, ESWAT was one of the last major ports to the Master System as it neared the end of its generational life cycle. Like other arcade ports such as Shinobi, this version featured a "health meter" that would allow the player to take several hits before losing a life, instead of simply one or two. The Genesis version was more faithful to the arcade in terms of graphics and gameplay.

A Virtual Console version for the Wii was released in August 2007 in Japan and in PAL regions on September 7.

The game also appeared in Sonic's Ultimate Genesis Collection (also known as the Sega Mega Drive Ultimate Collection in Europe and Australia) for Xbox 360 and PlayStation 3.

The game was released on the Nintendo Classics service for the Nintendo Switch on April 11, 2025.
