= Slap Shot (video game) =

1990 video game

- Developer: Sanritsu Denki
- Publisher: Sega
- Platform: Master System
- Release: 1990
- Genre: Sports
- Modes: Single-player, multiplayer

Slap Shot is a 1990 sports video game, simulating ice hockey, developed by Sanritsu Denki and published by Sega for the Master System.

== Gameplay ==
Slap Shot's gameplay is similar to Ice Hockey and Blades of Steel. This game allows the option of choosing to play an exhibition match or in a tournament.

== Teams ==
Slap Shot has 24 different teams split into three pools. Loosely based on IIHF World Championships pools by the time the game was released, the three groups have different difficulty levels, Pool A being the hardest, Pool B being Normal, and Pool C being easiest. It's not possibly to play teams from different pools.

=== Pool A ===
- (United States) America
- Canada
- Czechoslovakia
- Finland
- Poland
- Sweden
- (Soviet Union) USSR
- West Germany

=== Pool B ===
- Austria
- Denmark
- East Germany
- France
- Italy
- Japan
- Norway
- Switzerland

=== Pool C ===
- Australia
- Bulgaria
- China
- Hungary
- (Netherlands) Holland
- North Korea
- South Korea
- (Socialist Federal Republic of Yugoslavia) Yugoslavia

== Visuals ==
Slap Shot's visuals are very similar to NES's Ice Hockey (by using the same rink and the players are very very similar to that of Konami's Blades of Steel). However, Slap Shot brought something new to the table that those games did not which it the "Shot Cam Replay" which was only seen in a hockey game call Face Off! for the DOS back in 1988. But other than that, Slap Shot is a clone of Blades of Steel and Ice Hockey.
