= List of Game Gear games =

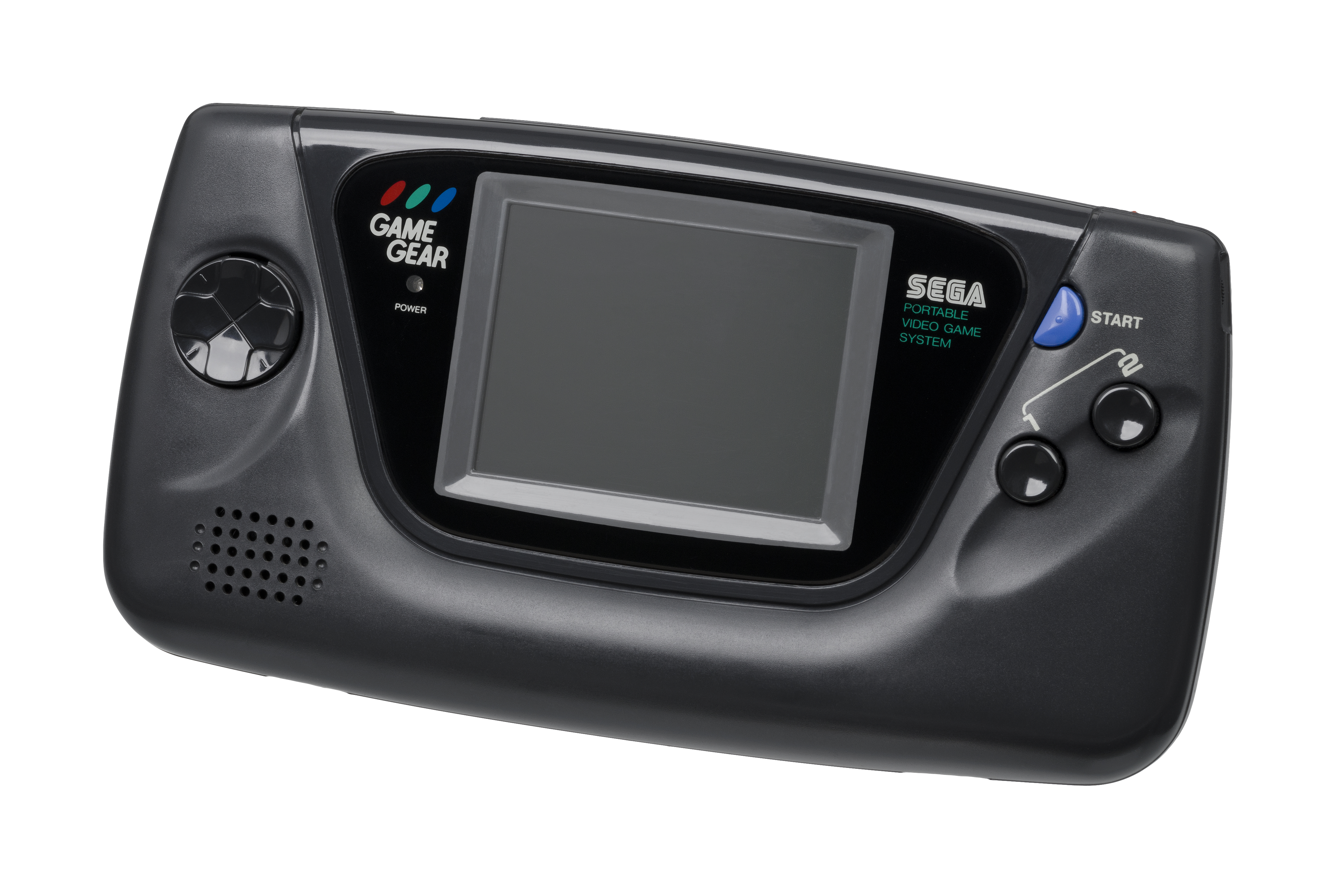
The Game Gear

This is a list of the 365 (Note: This number is always up to date by this script) games available for Sega's Game Gear handheld video game system. For games that were announced for the Game Gear, but never ended up releasing, see the list of cancelled Game Gear games.

There was an adapter for the Game Gear that allowed it to play Master System games. This article lists only the video games that were conceived for the Game Gear. For games originally released for the Master System, see List of Master System games.

== Games ==
Title(s)	Developer(s)	Publisher(s)	Release date		
Title(s)	Developer(s)	Publisher(s)	JP	NA	PAL
5 in 1 Funpak	Beam Software	Interplay Entertainment	Unreleased	1994	Unreleased
Aah! Harimanada	Sega	Sega	July 2, 1993	Unreleased	Unreleased
The Addams Family	Arc Developments	Flying Edge^{WW} Acclaim Entertainment^{JP}	June 24, 1994	1993	December 1993
The Adventures of Batman & Robin	Novotrade	Sega	Unreleased	June 1995	1995
Aerial Assault	Sega	Sega	June 5, 1992	1992	1992
Aladdin	SIMS	Sega	March 25, 1994	May 1994	February 1994
Alien 3	Probe Software	Arena Entertainment^{WW} Acclaim Entertainment^{JP}	May 27, 1994	1993	1993
Alien Syndrome	SIMS	SIMS^{JP} Sega^{EU}	March 19, 1992	Unreleased	December 3, 1992
Andre Agassi Tennis	Spidersoft	Sega	Unreleased	February 1993	Unreleased
Arcade Classics	Al Baker & Associates	Sega	Unreleased	1996	Unreleased
Arch Rivals	Arc Developments	Flying Edge	Unreleased	December 1992	Unreleased
Arena: Maze of Death; Arena^{EU}	Eden Entertainment Software	Sega	Unreleased	1996	1996
Ariel the Little Mermaid	BlueSky Software	Sega	Unreleased	February 1993	1992
Asterix and the Great Rescue	Core Design	Sega	Unreleased	1994	September 1994
Asterix and the Secret Mission	Sega	Sega	Unreleased	Unreleased	1993
Ax Battler: A Legend of Golden Axe	Aspect	Sega	November 1, 1991	March 1992	1992
Baku Baku Animal^{JP} Baku Baku^{WW}	Sega AM3; Minato Giken	Sega	January 26, 1996	1996	July 1996
Batman Forever	Probe Entertainment	Acclaim Entertainment	October 27, 1995	September 7, 1995	October 1995
Batman Returns	Aspect	Sega	October 23, 1992	September 1992	1992
Batter Up; Gear Stadium^{JP}	Namco	Namco	April 5, 1991	1992	Unreleased
Battleship: The Classic Naval Combat Game	NGM Productions	Mindscape	Unreleased	1993	Unreleased
Battletoads	Arc System Works	Tradewest^{NA} Sega^{EU/JP}	January 14, 1994	December 1993	1993
Beavis and Butt-Head	NuFX	Viacom New Media	Unreleased	1994	1995
The Berenstain Bears' Camping Adventure	Realtime Associates	Sega	Unreleased	1994	Unreleased
Berlin no Kabe	Inter State	Kaneko	November 29, 1991	Unreleased	Unreleased
Bishoujo Senshi Sailor Moon S	Shimada Kikaku	Bandai	January 27, 1995	Unreleased	Unreleased
Bonkers: Wax Up!	Al Baker & Associates	Sega	Unreleased	February 1995	1995
Bram Stoker's Dracula	Probe Software	Sony Imagesoft	Unreleased	August 1993	November 19, 1993
Bubble Bobble	Open Corp.	Taito	Unreleased	November 1994	Unreleased
Bugs Bunny in Double Trouble	Atod; Probe Entertainment; Climax Studios	Sega	Unreleased	1996	August 15, 1996
Bust-A-Move; Puzzle Bobble^{JP}	Santos	Taito^{JP} Sega^{NA}	August 2, 1996	1996	Unreleased
Buster Ball	Riverhillsoft	Riverhillsoft	March 20, 1992	Unreleased	Unreleased
Buster Fight	SIMS	Sega	February 11, 1994	Unreleased	Unreleased
Caesars Palace	Teeny Weeny Games	Virgin Games	Unreleased	1994	Unreleased
Captain America and The Avengers	Realtime Associates	Mindscape	Unreleased	1993	Unreleased
Car License	System Vision	Mitsubishi	1995	Unreleased	Unreleased
Casino FunPak	Beam Software	Interplay Entertainment	Unreleased	1995	Unreleased
Castle of Illusion Starring Mickey Mouse	Sega	Sega	March 21, 1991	June 1990	June 1990
Chakan	Sega	Sega	Unreleased	December 8, 1992	1992
Championship Hockey	Electronic Arts	U.S. Gold	Unreleased	Unreleased	1994
Chase H.Q.	Taito	Taito	March 8, 1991	February 1992	Unreleased
Cheese Cat-Astrophe Starring Speedy Gonzales	Cryo Interactive	Sega	Unreleased	1995	February 1, 1995
The Chessmaster	NovaLogic	Sega	Unreleased	December 1991	1992
Chicago Syndicate	Sega	Sega	Unreleased	1995	Unreleased
Choplifter III	Teeny Weeny Games	Extreme Entertainment Group	Unreleased	1993	Unreleased
Chuck Rock	Core Design	Sega	October 30, 1992	September 1992	October 15, 1992
Chuck Rock II: Son of Chuck	Core Design	Tengen	Unreleased	1994	1994
CJ Elephant Fugitive	Big Red Software	Codemasters	Unreleased	1994	1994
Cliffhanger	Spidersoft	Sony Imagesoft	Unreleased	1994	Unreleased
Clutch Hitter	Sega	Sega	Unreleased	1991	Unreleased
Coca-Cola Kid	Aspect	Sega	August 5, 1994	Unreleased	Unreleased
Columns	Sega	Sega	October 6, 1990	April 26, 1991	June 1991
Cool Spot	Virgin Interactive Entertainment	Virgin Interactive Entertainment	Unreleased	October 1993	June 19, 1994
Cosmic Spacehead	Supersonic Software	Codemasters	Unreleased	November 1993	1993
Crayon Shin-chan: Taiketsu! Kantam Panic!!	Minato Giken	Bandai	February 24, 1995	Unreleased	Unreleased
Crystal Warriors	Sega	Sega	December 13, 1991	April 1992	1992
Cutthroat Island	Software Creations	Acclaim Entertainment	Unreleased	1995	Unreleased
Daffy Duck in Hollywood	Probe Software	Sega	Unreleased	Unreleased	1994
Deep Duck Trouble Starring Donald Duck	Aspect	Sega	December 17, 1993	1993	January 1994
Defenders of Oasis	Sega	Sega	September 18, 1992	December 1992	1992
Desert Speedtrap Starring Road Runner and Wile E. Coyote	Probe Software	Sega	Unreleased	December 1993	1994
Desert Strike: Return to the Gulf; Desert Strike^{EU}	Tiertex	Domark	Unreleased	1994	1994
Devilish	Opera House	Genki^{JP} Sage's Creation^{NA} Sega^{EU}	March 29, 1991	1991	1991
Donald no Magical World	SIMS	Sega	March 4, 1994	Unreleased	Unreleased
Doraemon: Nora no Suke no Yabou	Sega	Sega	April 29, 1993	Unreleased	Unreleased
Doraemon: Wakuwaku Pocket Paradise	Sega	Sega	April 26, 1996	Unreleased	Unreleased
Double Dragon; Double Dragon: The Revenge of Billy Lee^{EU}	Virgin Games	Virgin Games	Unreleased	March 1993	1993
Dr. Robotnik's Mean Bean Machine; Puyo Puyo^{JP}	Compile	Sega	March 19, 1993	December 1993	January 1994
Dragon: The Bruce Lee Story	Virgin Interactive Entertainment	Virgin Interactive Entertainment^{EU} Acclaim Entertainment^{NA}	Unreleased	1995	September 1994
Dragon Crystal	Sega	Sega	December 22, 1990	1991	1991
Dropzone	Codemasters	Codemasters	Unreleased	Unreleased	1994
Dunk Kids	I.T.L	Sega	September 16, 1994	Unreleased	Unreleased
Dynamite Headdy	Minato Giken	Sega	August 5, 1994	September 1994	October 1994
Earthworm Jim	Eurocom	Playmates Interactive Entertainment^{NA} Virgin Interactive Entertainment^{EU}	Unreleased	July 1995	1995
Ecco the Dolphin	Novotrade	Sega	March 11, 1994	November 1993	October 1993
Ecco: The Tides of Time	Novotrade	Sega	February 3, 1995	November 1994	November 1994
Ernie Els Golf	Codemasters	Codemasters	Unreleased	Unreleased	1994
Eternal Legend	JAM	Sega	August 9, 1991	Unreleased	Unreleased
Evander Holyfield's Real Deal Boxing	Novotrade	Sega	Unreleased	February 1993	1992
The Excellent Dizzy Collection	Codemasters	Codemasters	Unreleased	Unreleased	April 1994
F-15 Strike Eagle	NMS Software	MicroProse	Unreleased	1993	1993
F1; Formula One^{NA}	Teque London	Domark	Unreleased	1993	1993
F1 World Championship Edition	Peakstar Software	Domark	Unreleased	Unreleased	1995
Faceball 2000	Xanth Software F/X	Riverhillsoft	December 17, 1993	Unreleased	Unreleased
Factory Panic	Japan System House	Sega	June 21, 1991	Unreleased	1991
Fantastic Dizzy	Codemasters	Codemasters	Unreleased	1993	1993
Fantasy Zone Gear	Sanritsu	Sanritsu^{JP} Sega^{WW}	July 19, 1991	1991	1991
Fatal Fury Special	Gaibrain; Aspect	Takara	November 25, 1994	1994	March 1995
FIFA International Soccer	Extended Play Productions; Tiertex	EA Sports^{WW} Electronic Arts Victor^{JP}	September 14, 1995	1994	1994
FIFA Soccer 96	Probe Entertainment	Black Pearl Software	Unreleased	1995	1995
Foreman For Real	Software Creations	Acclaim Entertainment	October 27, 1995	1995	Unreleased
Frank Thomas Big Hurt Baseball	Realtime Associates	Acclaim Entertainment	Unreleased	October 1995	Unreleased
Fray: Shuugyouhen	Micro Cabin	Micro Cabin	December 27, 1991	Unreleased	Unreleased
Fred Couples Golf	SIMS	Sega	December 23, 1994	1994	Unreleased
From TV Animation: Slam Dunk: Shouri he no Starting 5	SIMS	Bandai	December 16, 1994	Unreleased	Unreleased
G-LOC: Air Battle	Sega	Sega	December 15, 1990	April 1991	June 1991
Galaga '91; Galaga 2^{EU}	Now Production	Namco^{JP} Sega^{EU}	October 25, 1991	Unreleased	August 1993
Gamble Panic	Sega; Arc System Works	Sega	January 27, 1995	Unreleased	Unreleased
Gambler Jiko Chuushinha	Yellow Horn	Sega	June 12, 1992	Unreleased	Unreleased
Garfield: Caught in the Act	Novotrade	Sega	Unreleased	November 1995	December 14, 1995
Gear Stadium Heiseiban	Namco	Namco	October 20, 1995	Unreleased	Unreleased
Gear Works	Teque London	Sony Imagesoft	Unreleased	1994	Unreleased
George Foreman's KO Boxing^{WW} Heavyweight Champ^{JP}	SIMS	SIMS^{JP} Flying Edge^{WW}	December 27, 1991	May 1992	1992
GG Aleste	Compile	Compile	December 29, 1991	Unreleased	Unreleased
GG Portrait: Pai Chan	Sega	Sega	November 22, 1996	Unreleased	Unreleased
GG Portrait: Yuuki Akira	Sega	Sega	November 1, 1996	Unreleased	Unreleased
The G.G. Shinobi	Sega	Sega	April 26, 1991	June 1991	1991
The G.G. Shinobi II: The Silent Fury	Sega	Sega	December 11, 1992	December 1992	1992
Global Gladiators	Virgin Games USA	Virgin Games	Unreleased	Unreleased	1993
Godzilla: Kaijuu no Daishingeki	SIMS	Sega	December 8, 1995	Unreleased	Unreleased
GP Rider	Sega AM2	Sega	April 22, 1994	1994	1994
Greendog: The Beached Surfer Dude!	Interactive Designs	Sega	Unreleased	1993	Unreleased
Griffin	Telenet Japan	Renovation Game	July 26, 1991	Unreleased	Unreleased
Gunstar Heroes	M2	Sega	March 24, 1995	Unreleased	Unreleased
Halley Wars	I.T.L	Taito^{JP} Sega^{WW}	June 21, 1991	1991	1991
Head Buster	NCS; Winds	Masaya	March 15, 1991	Unreleased	Unreleased
Home Alone	Sega	Sega	Unreleased	December 1992	December 1992
Honō no Tōkyūji: Dodge Danpei	SIMS	Sega	August 7, 1992	Unreleased	Unreleased
Hook	Spidersoft	Sony Imagesoft	Unreleased	July 1993	November 12, 1993
House of Tarot	Japan System Supply	Sega	March 8, 1991	Unreleased	Unreleased
Hurricanes	Arc Developments	U.S. Gold	Unreleased	Unreleased	1994
Hyokkori Hyoutanjima: Hyoutanjima no Daikoukai	Japan System House	Sega	May 22, 1992	Unreleased	Unreleased
Hyper Pro Yakyuu '92	Sega	Sega	April 24, 1992	Unreleased	Unreleased
The Incredible Crash Dummies	Teeny Weeny Games	Flying Edge^{WW} Acclaim Entertainment^{JP}	September 30, 1994	1993	May 1993
The Incredible Hulk	Probe Software	U.S. Gold	Unreleased	July 1994	June 1994
Indiana Jones and the Last Crusade	Tiertex	U.S. Gold	Unreleased	1991	1992
Iron Man/X-O Manowar in Heavy Metal	Realtime Associates	Acclaim Entertainment	Unreleased	November 14, 1996	Unreleased
The Itchy & Scratchy Game	Bits Studios	Acclaim Entertainment	Unreleased	1995	1995
J.League GG Pro Striker '94	SIMS	Sega	July 22, 1994	Unreleased	Unreleased
J.League Soccer: Dream Eleven	SIMS	Sega	November 24, 1995	Unreleased	Unreleased
James Bond 007: The Duel	The Kremlin	Domark	Unreleased	Unreleased	January 1994
James Pond 2: Codename: Robocod	Vectordean	U.S. Gold	Unreleased	1993	1993
James Pond 3: Operation Starfish	Vectordean	U.S. Gold	Unreleased	Unreleased	1994
Jeopardy!	GameTek	GameTek	Unreleased	August 1993	Unreleased
Jeopardy! Sports Edition	GameTek	GameTek	Unreleased	1994	Unreleased
Joe Montana Football	BlueSky Software	Sega	May 22, 1992	1992	1992
Journey from Darkness: Strider Returns	Tiertex	U.S. Gold	Unreleased	February 1993	1994
Judge Dredd	Probe Software	Acclaim Entertainment	Unreleased	June 16, 1995	1995
Junction	Micronet	Micronet	February 24, 1991	1991	Unreleased
The Jungle Book	Syrox Developments	Virgin Interactive Entertainment	Unreleased	January 1994	1994
Jungle Strike	Unexpected Development	Black Pearl Software	Unreleased	1995	Unreleased
Jurassic Park	Sega	Sega	July 30, 1993	October 1993	November 1993
Kaitō Saint Tail	Minato Giken	Sega	March 29, 1996	Unreleased	Unreleased
Kawasaki Superbike Challenge	Teque London	Domark	Unreleased	1995	1995
Kenyuu Densetsu Yaiba	Sega	Sega	September 9, 1994	Unreleased	Unreleased
Kinetic Connection	Japan System House	Sega	March 29, 1991	Unreleased	Unreleased
Kishin Douji Zenki	Sega	Sega	September 1, 1995	Unreleased	Unreleased
Klax	Atari Games	Tengen	Unreleased	1991	December 10, 1992
Krusty's Fun House	Audiogenic	Flying Edge	Unreleased	May 1992	May 1993
Kuni-Chan no Game Tengoku	Sega	Sega	November 22, 1991	Unreleased	Unreleased
Kuni-Chan no Game Tengoku Part 2	Sega	Sega	December 18, 1992	Unreleased	Unreleased
Land of Illusion Starring Mickey Mouse	Sega	Sega	March 26, 1993	May 1993	1993
Last Action Hero	Bits Studios	Sony Imagesoft	Unreleased	1993	Unreleased
Legend of Illusion Starring Mickey Mouse	Aspect	Sega	January 13, 1995	January 1995	February 1995
Lemmings	Probe Software	Sega	February 5, 1993	1992	December 1992
The Lion King	Syrox Developments	Sega	January 13, 1995	November 9, 1994	November 4, 1994
The Lost World: Jurassic Park	Aspect	Sega	Unreleased	August 26, 1997	Unreleased
The Lucky Dime Caper Starring Donald Duck	Sega	Sega	December 20, 1991	October 1991	November 1991
Lunar: Sanposuru Gakuen	Ehrgeiz; Studio Alex	Game Arts	January 12, 1996	Unreleased	Unreleased
Madden NFL '95	Tiertex; Extended Play Productions	EA Sports	Unreleased	1995	1995
Madden 96	Tiertex	Black Pearl Software	Unreleased	1996	1996
Madō Monogatari I: Mittsu no Madō-kyū	Compile	Sega	December 3, 1993	Unreleased	Unreleased
Madō Monogatari II: Arle 16-Sai	Compile	Sega	May 20, 1994	Unreleased	Unreleased
Madō Monogatari III: Kyūkyoku Joō-sama	Compile	Sega	November 25, 1994	Unreleased	Unreleased
Madō Monogatari A: Dokidoki Vacation	Compile	Compile	November 24, 1995	Unreleased	Unreleased
Mahou Kishi Rayearth	Sega	Sega	December 16, 1994	Unreleased	Unreleased
Mahou Kishi Rayearth 2: Making of Magic Knight	Sega	Sega	August 4, 1995	Unreleased	Unreleased
Magical Taruruto-kun	Tsukuda Ideal	Tsukuda Ideal	July 5, 1991	Unreleased	Unreleased
The Majors: Pro Baseball	I.T.L	Sega	Unreleased	December 1992	Unreleased
Man Overboard!	Zeppelin Games	Codemasters	Unreleased	Unreleased	1994
Mappy	Nova Co., Ltd	Namco	May 24, 1991	Unreleased	Unreleased
Marble Madness	Atari Games	Tengen	Unreleased	September 1992	September 1992
Marko's Magic Football	The Cartoon Mavericks	Domark	Unreleased	Unreleased	1993
Master of Darkness; Vampire: Master of Darkness^{NA}	SIMS	SIMS^{JP} Sega^{WW}	October 23, 1992	June 1993	1993
Mega Man	Freestyle	U.S. Gold	Unreleased	October 1995	Unreleased
Megami Tensei Gaiden: Last Bible	SIMS	Sega	April 22, 1994	Unreleased	Unreleased
Megami Tensei Gaiden: Last Bible S	SIMS	Sega	March 24, 1995	Unreleased	Unreleased
Mickey's Ultimate Challenge	Designer Software	Hi Tech Expressions	Unreleased	1994	Unreleased
Micro Machines	Codemasters	Codemasters	Unreleased	March 1994	March 1994
Micro Machines 2: Turbo Tournament	Codemasters	Codemasters	Unreleased	Unreleased	1995
Mighty Morphin Power Rangers	SIMS	Sega	Unreleased	1994	1994
Mighty Morphin Power Rangers: The Movie	SIMS	Sega; Banpresto	Unreleased	1995	1995
MLBPA Baseball	High Score Productions; Beam Software	EA Sports	Unreleased	1995	Unreleased
Moldorian: Hikari to Yami no Sister	Rit's	Sega	October 30, 1994	Unreleased	Unreleased
Monster Truck Wars	Gremlin Graphics	Acclaim Entertainment	Unreleased	1994	1994
Mortal Kombat	Probe Software	Arena Entertainment^{WW} Acclaim Entertainment^{JP}	December 17, 1993	September 13, 1993	September 13, 1993
Mortal Kombat II	Probe Software	Acclaim Entertainment	September 9, 1994	September 9, 1994	September 9, 1994
Mortal Kombat 3	Software Creations	Acclaim Entertainment	Unreleased	Unreleased	1995
Ms. Pac-Man	Now Production	Namco	Unreleased	1995	Unreleased
Nazo Puyo	Compile	Sega	July 23, 1993	Unreleased	Unreleased
Nazo Puyo 2	Compile	Sega	December 10, 1993	Unreleased	Unreleased
Nazo Puyo Arle no Roux	Compile	Sega	July 29, 1994	Unreleased	Unreleased
NBA Action Starring David Robinson	Sega InterActive	Sega	Unreleased	1994	Unreleased
NBA Jam	Iguana UK	Arena Entertainment^{WW} Acclaim Entertainment^{JP}	April 29, 1994	March 4, 1994	March 4, 1994
NBA Jam Tournament Edition	Iguana UK	Acclaim Entertainment	February 24, 1995	February 23, 1995	February 23, 1995
NFL '95	BlueSky Software	Sega	Unreleased	November 15, 1994	Unreleased
NFL Quarterback Club	Condor	Acclaim Entertainment	February 24, 1995	1994	1994
NFL Quarterback Club 96	Condor	Acclaim Entertainment	Unreleased	October 27, 1995	Unreleased
NHL All-Star Hockey	Gray Matter	Sega	Unreleased	1995	Unreleased
NHL Hockey	High Score Productions; Realtime Associates	EA Sports	Unreleased	1995	1995
Ninja Gaiden	Japan System House	Sega	November 1, 1991	December 1991	1991
Ninku	Sega	Sega	July 21, 1995	Unreleased	Unreleased
Ninku 2: Tenkuryu-e no Michi	Japan System House	Sega	December 22, 1995	Unreleased	Unreleased
Ninku Gaiden: Hiroyuki Daikatsugeki	Sega	Sega	November 3, 1995	Unreleased	Unreleased
Olympic Gold: Barcelona '92	Tiertex	U.S. Gold^{WW} Sega^{JP}	July 24, 1992	1992	1992
The Ottifants	Graftgold	Sega	Unreleased	Unreleased	1993
Out Run	Sega	Sega	August 9, 1991	Unreleased	1991
Out Run Europa	Probe Software	U.S. Gold	Unreleased	1992	1991
Pac-Attack	Now Production	Namco	Unreleased	June 1994	Unreleased
Pac-Man	Namco	Namco	January 29, 1991	1991	Unreleased
Panzer Dragoon Mini	Rit's	Sega	November 22, 1996	Unreleased	Unreleased
Paperboy	Tiertex	Tengen	Unreleased	1991	September 24, 1992
Paperboy 2	Manley & Associates	Tengen	Unreleased	December 1993	Unreleased
Pengo	Arc System Works	Sega	October 6, 1990	Unreleased	December 12, 1991
Pet Club: Inu Daisuki!	Sega	Sega	December 6, 1996	Unreleased	Unreleased
Pet Club: Neko Daisuki!	Sega	Sega	July 19, 1996	Unreleased	Unreleased
Pete Sampras Tennis	Big Red Software	Codemasters	Unreleased	1994	1994
PGA Tour Golf	Polygames	Tengen	Unreleased	1994	1994
PGA Tour Golf II	Polygames	Time Warner Interactive	Unreleased	1995	1995
PGA Tour 96	Ceris Software	Black Pearl Software	Unreleased	1996	January 26, 1996
Phantasy Star Adventure	Japan System House	Sega	March 13, 1992	Unreleased	Unreleased
Phantasy Star Gaiden	Japan System Supply	Sega	October 16, 1992	Unreleased	Unreleased
Phantom 2040	Unexpected Development	Viacom New Media	Unreleased	June 1995	1995
Pinball Dreams	Spidersoft	GameTek	Unreleased	1994	Unreleased
Pocket Jansou	Namco	Namco	February 7, 1992	Unreleased	Unreleased
Poker Face Paul's Blackjack	Spidersoft	Adrenalin	Unreleased	1994	Unreleased
Poker Face Paul's Gin	Adrenalin	Sega	Unreleased	1994	Unreleased
Poker Face Paul's Poker	Adrenalin	Sega	Unreleased	1994	Unreleased
Poker Face Paul's Solitaire	Spidersoft	Sega	Unreleased	1994	Unreleased
Pop Breaker	Microcabin	Microcabin	February 23, 1991	Unreleased	Unreleased
Popeye Beach Volleyball	Technōs Japan	Technōs Japan	August 12, 1994	Unreleased	Unreleased
Popils	Tengen	Tengen	July 12, 1991	1992	1992
Power Drive	Rage Software	U.S. Gold	Unreleased	Unreleased	June 1995
Power Strike II	Compile	Sega	October 1, 1993	Unreleased	1993
Predator 2	Teeny Weeny Games	Arena Entertainment	Unreleased	1992	1992
Primal Rage	Probe Entertainment	Time Warner Interactive	Unreleased	1995	1995
Prince of Persia	Domark	Domark	Unreleased	1992	1992
The Pro Yakyuu '91	Santos	Sega	January 26, 1991	Unreleased	Unreleased
Pro Yakyuu GG League	Sega	Sega	April 29, 1993	Unreleased	Unreleased
Pro Yakyuu GG League '94	Sega	Sega	September 30, 1994	Unreleased	Unreleased
Psychic World	Sanritsu	Sega	February 2, 1991	1991	1991
Putt & Putter	SIMS	Sega	September 27, 1991	1991	1991
Puyo Puyo 2	Compile	Compile	December 16, 1994	Unreleased	Unreleased
Puzzle & Action: Ichidant-R GG	Sega	Sega	November 25, 1994	Unreleased	Unreleased
Puzzle & Action: Tant-R	Sega	Sega	April 22, 1994	Unreleased	Unreleased
Quest for the Shaven Yak Starring Ren Hoëk & Stimpy	Realtime Associates	Sega	Unreleased	1994	November 1993
The Quiz Gear Fight!!	Minato Giken	Sega	April 7, 1995	Unreleased	Unreleased
Rastan Saga	Taito	Taito	August 9, 1991	Unreleased	Unreleased
R.B.I. Baseball '94	Al Baker & Associates	Time Warner Interactive	Unreleased	1994	Unreleased
R.C. Grand Prix	Absolute Entertainment	Absolute Entertainment	Unreleased	February 1993	Unreleased
Riddick Bowe Boxing	Micronet	Micronet^{JP} Extreme Entertainment Group^{NA}	January 21, 1994	1994	Unreleased
Rise of the Robots	Data Design Interactive	Time Warner Interactive	Unreleased	1994	1994
Ristar	Japan System House	Sega	February 17, 1995	February 16, 1995	January 1995
Road Rash	Probe Software	U.S. Gold	Unreleased	March 1994	1993
RoboCop 3	Eden Entertainment Software	Flying Edge; Acclaim Entertainment^{JP}	June 24, 1994	August 1993	November 1993
RoboCop Versus The Terminator	NMS Software	Virgin Games	Unreleased	1993	1993
Royal Stone: Hirakareshi Toki no Tobira	Sega	Sega	February 24, 1995	Unreleased	Unreleased
Samurai Shodown	Takara	Takara	December 9, 1994	1994	Unreleased
The Smurfs	Bit Managers	Infogrames	Unreleased	Unreleased	1994
The Smurfs Travel the World	Infogrames	Infogrames	Unreleased	Unreleased	1995
Scratch Golf	Eleca; SIMS	Vic Tokai	March 25, 1994	1994	Unreleased
SD Gundam: Winner's History	I.T.L	Bandai	March 24, 1995	Unreleased	Unreleased
Sega Game Pack 4 in 1	Sega	Sega	Unreleased	Unreleased	1992
Sensible Soccer	Sensible Software	Sony Imagesoft	Unreleased	Unreleased	November 1993
Shanghai II	Falcon	Sunsoft	December 27, 1990	Unreleased	Unreleased
Shaq Fu	Tiertex	Electronic Arts	Unreleased	1995	Unreleased
Shikinjou	Sunsoft	Sunsoft	April 26, 1991	Unreleased	Unreleased
Shining Force Gaiden: Ensei – Jashin no Kuni he	Sonic! Software Planning	Sega	December 25, 1992	Unreleased	Unreleased
Shining Force: The Sword of Hajya	Sonic! Software Planning	Sega	June 25, 1993	October 1994	Unreleased
Shining Force Gaiden: Final Conflict	Sonic! Software Planning	Sega	June 30, 1995	Unreleased	Unreleased
Side Pocket	Data East; ISCO; Opera House	Data East	Unreleased	1994	Unreleased
The Simpsons: Bart vs. the Space Mutants	Arc Developments	Flying Edge	Unreleased	December 1992	January 5, 1993
The Simpsons: Bart vs. the World	Arc Developments	Flying Edge^{WW} Acclaim Entertainment^{JP}	July 29, 1994	October 1993	May 25, 1993
The Simpsons: Bartman Meets Radioactive Man	Teeny Weeny Games	Flying Edge	Unreleased	February 1994	Unreleased
Slider	Loriciel	Victor	April 26, 1991	1991	1991
Sōkoban	Thinking Rabbit	Riverhillsoft	December 15, 1990	Unreleased	Unreleased
Solitaire FunPak	Beam Software	Interplay	Unreleased	1994	Unreleased
Solitaire Poker	Face	Face^{JP} Sega^{WW}	May 31, 1991	1991	1991
Sonic 2 in 1 (Note: A compilation of Sonic the Hedgehog 2 & Sonic Spinball in one cartridge.)	Aspect; Sega InterActive	Sega	Unreleased	Unreleased	1995
Sonic Blast	Aspect	Sega	December 13, 1996	November 1996	November 1996
Sonic Drift	Sega	Sega	March 18, 1994	Unreleased	Unreleased
Sonic Drift 2 Sonic Drift Racing^{EU}	Sega	Sega	March 17, 1995	November 1995	April 1995
Sonic Labyrinth	Minato Giken	Sega	November 17, 1995	November 1995	November 1995
Sonic the Hedgehog	Ancient	Sega	December 28, 1991	February 1992	November 18, 1991
Sonic the Hedgehog 2	Aspect	Sega	November 21, 1992	December 1992	November 24, 1992
Sonic the Hedgehog Chaos	Aspect	Sega	November 19, 1993	November 23, 1993	November 23, 1993
Sonic the Hedgehog Spinball	Sega InterActive	Sega	Unreleased	September 1994	August 1994
Sonic the Hedgehog: Triple Trouble	Aspect	Sega	November 11, 1994	November 1994	November 1994
Space Harrier	Sega	Sega	December 28, 1991	November 1991	December 1991
Spider-Man vs. The Kingpin	Sega	Flying Edge	Unreleased	May 19, 1992	April 1992
Spider-Man: Return of the Sinister Six	Bits Studios	Flying Edge	Unreleased	1993	1993
Spider-Man and the X-Men in Arcade's Revenge	Software Creations	Flying Edge	Unreleased	March 1994	Unreleased
Sports Illustrated: Championship Football & Baseball	Unexpected Development	Black Pearl Software	Unreleased	1995	Unreleased
Sports Trivia	Adrenalin	Sega	Unreleased	1995	Unreleased
Sports Trivia: Championship Edition	Adrenalin	Sega	Unreleased	1995	Unreleased
Stargate	Probe Software	Acclaim Entertainment	May 26, 1995	1994	1994
Star Trek: The Next Generation – The Advanced Holodeck Tutorial	Absolute Entertainment	Absolute Entertainment	Unreleased	1994	Unreleased
Star Trek Generations: Beyond the Nexus	Absolute Entertainment	Absolute Entertainment	Unreleased	1994	Unreleased
Star Wars	Tiertex	U.S. Gold	Unreleased	1993	1993
Streets of Rage	Japan System House	Sega	November 27, 1992	December 31, 1992	October 18, 1992
Streets of Rage 2	Japan System House	Sega	July 23, 1993	August 1993	1993
Striker	Rage Software	Sega	Unreleased	Unreleased	1995
Super Battletank	Absolute Entertainment	Majesco	Unreleased	2001	Unreleased
Super Columns	Sega	Sega	May 26, 1995	June 5, 1995	1995
Super Golf	Sigma Enterprises	Sigma Enterprises^{JP} Sage's Creation^{NA}	April 19, 1991	1991	Unreleased
Super Kick Off	Anco Games; Tiertex	Sega	Unreleased	Unreleased	1991
Super Momotarou Dentetsu III	Hudson Soft	Hudson Soft	December 15, 1995	Unreleased	Unreleased
Super Monaco GP	Sega	Sega	October 6, 1990	1991	1991
Ayrton Senna's Super Monaco GP II	Sega; Arc System Works	Sega	August 28, 1992	September 1992	August 1992
Super Off Road	Graftgold	Virgin Games	Unreleased	January 1993	December 12, 1992
Super Smash TV	Probe Software	Flying Edge^{WW} Acclaim Entertainment^{JP}	July 29, 1994	September 1992	December 17, 1992
Super Space Invaders	Tiertex	Domark	Unreleased	1992	1992
Super Star Wars: Return of the Jedi	Realtime Associates	Black Pearl Software	Unreleased	1995	1995
Superman: The Man of Steel	Graftgold	Virgin Games	Unreleased	Unreleased	1993
Surf Ninjas	NuFX	Sega	Unreleased	August 1993	1993
Sylvan Tale	Sega	Sega	January 27, 1995	Unreleased	Unreleased
T2: The Arcade Game	Probe Software	Arena Entertainment^{WW} Acclaim Entertainment^{JP}	February 25, 1994	September 1993	January 1994
Tails Adventure	Aspect	Sega	September 22, 1995	November 1995	October 1995
Tails' Skypatrol	Japan System House; SIMS	Sega	April 28, 1995	Unreleased	Unreleased
Taisen Mahjong HaoPai	Arc	Sega	November 10, 1990	Unreleased	Unreleased
Taisen Mahjong HaoPai 2	Arc System Works	Sega	December 17, 1993	Unreleased	Unreleased
Taisen-gata: Daisenryaku G	SystemSoft	SystemSoft	September 28, 1991	Unreleased	Unreleased
TaleSpin	Sega InterActive	Sega	Unreleased	March 1993	1993
Tama & Friends: 3 Choume Kouen Tamalympic	Aspect	Sega	March 3, 1995	Unreleased	Unreleased
Tarzan: Lord of the Jungle	Eurocom	GameTek	Unreleased	Unreleased	November 10, 1994
Tatakae! Pro Yakyuu Twin League	Sega	Sega	July 14, 1995	Unreleased	Unreleased
Taz in Escape from Mars	Al Baker & Associates	Sega	Unreleased	October 1994	1994
Taz-Mania	NuFX	Sega	Unreleased	October 1992	December 1992
Tempo Jr.	SIMS	Sega	April 28, 1995	1995	1995
Tengen World Cup Soccer	SIMS	SIMS^{JP} Tengen^{WW}	May 28, 1993	August 1993	1993
The Terminator	Probe Software	Virgin Games	Unreleased	October 1992	December 3, 1992
Terminator 2: Judgment Day	Software Creations	Flying Edge^{WW} Acclaim Entertainment^{JP}	September 30, 1994	1993	1993
Tesserae	Eurocom	GameTek	Unreleased	November 1993	Unreleased
Tintin in Tibet	Bit Managers	Infogrames	Unreleased	Unreleased	1995
Tom and Jerry: The Movie	SIMS	Sega	June 25, 1993	July 14, 1993	1993
Torarete Tamaruka!?	Sega	Sega	June 3, 1994	Unreleased	Unreleased
True Lies	Beam Software	Acclaim Entertainment	May 12, 1995	February 1995	1995
Ultimate Soccer	Rage Software	Sega	October 29, 1993	Unreleased	1993
Urban Strike	Foley Hi-Tech	Black Pearl Software	Unreleased	1995	Unreleased
Virtua Fighter Animation	Aspect	Sega	March 29, 1996	August 30, 1996	1996
VR Troopers	Syrox Developments	Sega	Unreleased	1995	1995
Wagyan Land	Now Production	Namco	July 26, 1991	Unreleased	Unreleased
Wheel of Fortune	Imagitec Design	GameTek	Unreleased	August 1993	Unreleased
Wimbledon	SIMS	Sega	February 26, 1993	1992	1992
Winter Olympics: Lillehammer '94	Tiertex	U.S. Gold^{WW} Sega^{JP}	February 11, 1994	December 1993	1994
Wizard Pinball	Teque London	Domark	Unreleased	Unreleased	1995
Wolfchild	Core Design	Virgin Games	Unreleased	Unreleased	1993
Wonder Boy; Revenge of Drancon^{NA}	Sega	Sega	December 8, 1990	June 1991	June 1991
Wonder Boy: The Dragon's Trap	Westone	Sega	March 27, 1992	Unreleased	1992
Woody Pop	Sega	Sega	March 1, 1991	1991	1992
World Class Leader Board	Tiertex	Sega	Unreleased	1991	1991
World Cup USA '94	Tiertex	U.S. Gold	Unreleased	1994	1994
World Derby	CRI	CRI	May 27, 1994	Unreleased	Unreleased
World Series Baseball	I.T.L	Sega	Unreleased	November 1993	Unreleased
World Series Baseball '95; Nomo's World Series Baseball^{JP}	BlueSky Software	Sega	December 1, 1995	1994	Unreleased
WWF Raw	Realtime Associates	Acclaim Entertainment	Unreleased	November 1994	1994
WWF WrestleMania: Steel Cage Challenge	Teeny Weeny Games	Flying Edge	Unreleased	1993	1993
X-Men	Sega	Sega	Unreleased	January 1994	Unreleased
X-Men: Gamesmaster's Legacy	Sega	Sega	Unreleased	February 16, 1995	1995
X-Men: Mojo World	Sega	Sega	Unreleased	1996	Unreleased
Yu Yu Hakusho: Horobishi Mono no Gyakushuu	Minato Giken	Sega	March 18, 1994	Unreleased	Unreleased
Yu Yu Hakusho II: Gekitou! Nanakyou no Tatakai	Minato Giken	Sega	September 30, 1994	Unreleased	Unreleased
Zan Gear	Wolf Team	Wolf Team	October 23, 1990	Unreleased	Unreleased
Zool: Ninja of the "Nth" Dimension	Gremlin Graphics	Gremlin Graphics^{EU} GameTek^{NA} Infocom^{JP}	July 29, 1994	1993	1993
Zoop	Hookstone	Viacom New Media	Unreleased	1995	Unreleased

== See also ==
- List of cancelled Game Gear games
