= List of Tom and Jerry video games =

The animated cat and mouse duo Tom and Jerry have appeared in various video games.

== Release chart ==
Title	Release date	Platforms
Tom & Jerry (also known as Tom & Jerry: Hunting High and Low)	NA/EU: May 9, 1989	Amiga, Atari ST, C64, ZX Spectrum
Tom and Jerry: Yankee Doodle's CAT-astrophe	NA: October 30, 1990	MS-DOS
Tom and Jerry (and Tuffy); Tom and Jerry: The Ultimate Game of Cat and Mouse!	NA: December 3, 1991 (NES), 1993 (MS-DOS); EU: October 22, 1992; JP: November 13, 1992	NES, MS-DOS
Tom and Jerry	NA: October 31, 1992; EU: 1992; JP: December 18, 1992	Game Boy
Tom and Jerry	NA: April 2, 1993; EU: 1993; JP: June 25, 1993	Super NES
Tom and Jerry: The Movie	NA: July 14, 1993; EU: October 1, 1992 (Master System), 1993 (Game Gear); JP: June 25, 1993	Game Gear, Master System
Tom and Jerry: Frantic Antics	NA: October 2, 1993 (Game Boy), December 21, 1993 (Genesis); EU: 1993 (Game Boy); JP: January 14, 1994 (Game Boy), December 16, 1994 (Genesis)	Game Boy, Genesis
Tom and Jerry	NA: September 27, 1999; EU: July 6, 2000	Game Boy Color
Tom and Jerry in Fists of Furry	NA: November 11, 2000 (N64), 2002 (Windows); EU: August 11, 2000 (N64), September 3, 2002 (Windows)	Nintendo 64, Windows
Tom and Jerry in House Trap	NA: November 24, 2000; EU: December 1, 2000; JP: September 19, 2002	PlayStation
Tom and Jerry: Mouse Attacks!	NA/EU: December 8, 2000	Game Boy Color
Tom and Jerry: Mouse Hunt	NA: March 14, 2001; EU: December 15, 2000	Game Boy Color
Tom and Jerry: The Magic Ring	NA: February 21, 2002; EU: February 1, 2002	Game Boy Advance
Tom and Jerry in War of the Whiskers	NA: October 22, 2002 (PS2), January 4, 2003 (GameCube), November 25, 2003 (Xbox); EU: March 14, 2003; JP: January 29, 2004	PS2, GameCube, Xbox
Tom and Jerry in Infurnal Escape	NA: March 14, 2003; EU: May 9, 2003	Game Boy Advance
Tom and Jerry Cheese Chase	WW: March 4, 2004	Mobile phone
Tom and Jerry Food Fight	WW: May 23, 2005	Mobile phone
Tom and Jerry Tales	NA: November 7, 2006 (DS), December 8, 2006 (GBA); EU: December 8, 2006 (DS), December 8, 2006 (GBA); AU: November 17, 2006 (DS), December 8, 2006 (GBA)	Game Boy Advance, Nintendo DS
Tom and Jerry Pinball Pursuit	WW: June 6, 2007	Mobile phone
Tom and Jerry: Mouse Maze	WW: October 27, 2008, March 19, 2013 (Amazon); 2012 (Discontinued paid version) November 6, 2014 (Free version) (Android), 2014-2015 (Microsoft), 2018 (iOS)	Mobile phone, Amazon, Android, Microsoft, iOS
Tom and Jerry Learn & Play	WW: October 15, 2014	Android, iOS
Tom and Jerry: Chase	CHN: June 1, 2020; SEA: August 19, 2020	Android, iOS
MultiVersus	WW: May 28, 2024	Microsoft Windows, PlayStation 4, PlayStation 5, Xbox One, Xbox Series X/S
ACECRAFT	WW: August 26, 2025	Android, iOS

== List ==
=== Home computer game ===
Tom & Jerry (also known as Tom & Jerry: Hunting High and Low) was released for Amiga, Atari ST, and Commodore 64 computers in 1989 by Magic Bytes. Another game with identical gameplay, Tom & Jerry 2, was also released that year for the same platforms and the MSX, Amstrad CPC, and ZX Spectrum home computers.

=== NES/MS-DOS games ===
- A Tom and Jerry video game (also known as Tom and Jerry: The Ultimate Game of Cat and Mouse! or Tom and Jerry (and Tuffy)) was released by Hi Tech Expressions for the Nintendo Entertainment System on December 3, 1991 and for MS-DOS in 1993. Tom has mouse-napped Jerry's nephew Tuffy and locked him in a trunk in the attic. Usable weapons include bubble gum, meat cleaver, cups of water, moth balls, hammer, invisible ink and drill.
- Tom and Jerry: Yankee Doodle's CAT-astrophe was released for the PC in 1990, also by Hi Tech Expressions.

=== Game Boy games ===
- Tom and Jerry was released in October 1992 by Hi Tech Expressions in the US and by Altron in Japan.
- Tom and Jerry: Frantic Antics! is a video game based on the 1992 film Tom and Jerry: The Movie. The game was released on October 2, 1992 for the Game Boy and in December 1993 for the Genesis.

=== Sega games ===
In the Master System and Game Gear video game Tom and Jerry: The Movie, Tom adventurously chases Jerry. The video game for Sega Genesis Tom and Jerry: Frantic Antics! was based on the 1992 film of the same name. All three versions had completely different stages, but similar gameplay.

=== Super NES game ===
A Tom and Jerry video game was released for the Super NES by Hi Tech Expressions in April 1993 in the US and in December 1993 in Brazil, and by Altron on June 25, 1993 in Japan. The player controls Jerry, the mouse, as he traverses through four different themed worlds – a movie theater, a junkyard, a toy store, and a house. Tuffy is playable through second player.

Jerry or Tuffy use marbles as weapons. At the end of each world, Jerry goes into a battle with Tom, the cat.

Entertainment Weekly gave the game a B and wrote that "The competent yet often uninspired Hanna-Barbera cartoon series is now a competent yet often uninspired video game. In Tom & Jerry (Hi Tech Expressions, for Super NES), very small players may get a kick out of guiding mouse Jerry through nemesis Tom's none-too-wily traps."

=== Game Boy Color ===
- Tom and Jerry was released on September 27, 1999 by Majesco. It is a colorised version of the 1992 Game Boy game that also adds a bonus card-match game between each level.
- Tom and Jerry: Mouse Attacks was released on December 8, 2000 by Ubisoft.
- Tom and Jerry: Mouse Hunt was released on March 14, 2001 by Conspiracy Entertainment.

=== Game Boy Advance ===
- Tom and Jerry in Infurnal Escape (2003) was developed by CinéGroupe and published by NewKidCo.

=== Fighting games ===
Several fighting games have been released.

- Tom and Jerry: Yankee Doodle's CAT-astrophe (1990) for MS-DOS
- Tom and Jerry in Fists of Furry (2000) for Nintendo 64 and Windows
- Tom and Jerry in House Trap (2000) for the PlayStation and Game Boy Color
- Tom and Jerry in War of the Whiskers (2003) for PlayStation 2, Xbox, and GameCube

=== Mobile games ===
- Tom and Jerry Cheese Chase (2004) for mobile phone
- Tom and Jerry Food Fight (2005) for mobile phone
- Tom and Jerry Pinball Pursuit (2007) for mobile phone
- Tom and Jerry: Mouse Maze (2008) for mobile phone, Amazon, Android, Microsoft, and iOS

=== Browser games ===
Several Flash and HTML5 games have been released. Below are selected games.

==== Flash games ====
- Tom and Jerry: Food Fight (also known as Free-For-All) (2005)
- Tom and Jerry: Mouse about the House (2006)
- Tom and Jerry in What's the Catch? (remade in HTML5)
- Tom and Jerry in Midnight Snack
- Tom's Trap-O-Matic

==== HTML5 games ====
- The Tom and Jerry Show: Cheese Swipe
- Tom and Jerry: Backyard Battle
- Tom and Jerry: Chocolate Chase
- Tom and Jerry: Run Jerry
- Tom and Jerry: Match N' Catch

== See also ==
Droopy's Tennis Open
