= List of Power Rangers (Boom! Studios) comics =

Power Rangers is a comic book franchise published by Boom! Studios, based on the television series of the same name created by Haim Saban and Shuki Levy, which is also based on the Super Sentai franchise created by Shotaro Ishinomori and Saburo Yatsude for Toei Company. Initially licensed through Saban Brands in 2015, the rights moved to Hasbro in 2018. This article is about the list of related comics published by Boom!

== Publications ==
=== Ongoing series ===
Title	Issues	Premiere date	Finale date	Writer(s)	Artist(s)	Note(s)
Mighty Morphin Power Rangers (vol. 1)	#0–55 (plus 3 annuals and 1 special)	January 13, 2016	October 21, 2020	Kyle Higgins, Marguerite Bennett and Ryan Parrott	Hendry Prasetya, Jonas Scharf, Daniele Di Nicuolo, Simone Di Meo and Moisés Hidalgo	
Go Go Power Rangers	#1–32	July 26, 2017	June 10, 2020	Ryan Parrott and Sina Grace	Dan Mora, Eleonora Carlini and Francesco Mortarino	
Mighty Morphin	#1–22	November 4, 2020	August 3, 2022	Ryan Parrott and Mat Groom	Marco Renna and Moisés Hidalgo	
Power Rangers	#1–22	November 11, 2020	August 10, 2022	Ryan Parrott	Francesco Mortarino and Marco Renna	
Mighty Morphin Power Rangers (vol. 2)	#100–122	September 28, 2022	July 24, 2024	Melissa Flores	Simona Di Gianfelce	
Power Rangers Prime	#1–16	November 13, 2024	April 8, 2026	Melissa Flores	Michael Yg	
Mighty Morphin Power Rangers: Once a Ranger	#1–	June 3, 2026	Present	Marguerite Bennett	Andrew Griffith	N/A

=== Limited series ===
Title	Issues	Premiere date	Finale date	Writer(s)	Artist(s)	Note(s)
Mighty Morphin Power Rangers: Pink	#1–6	June 1, 2016	January 25, 2017	Brenden Fletcher, Kelly Thompson and Tini Howard	Daniele Di Nicuolo	
Justice League/Mighty Morphin Power Rangers (Note: Co-published with DC Comics.)	#1–6	January 11, 2017	September 27, 2017	Tom Taylor	Stephen Byrne	
Mighty Morphin Power Rangers/Teenage Mutant Ninja Turtles (Note: Co-published with IDW Publishing and Nickelodeon.)	#1–5	December 4, 2019	June 17, 2020	Ryan Parrott	Simone Di Meo	
Power Rangers: Drakkon New Dawn	#1–3	August 19, 2020	October 28, 2020	Anthony Burch	Simone Ragazzoni	
Power Rangers Universe	#1–6	December 29, 2021	May 25, 2022	Nicole Andelfinger	Simone Ragazzoni	
Godzilla vs. Mighty Morphin Power Rangers (Note: with IDW Publishing and Toho.)	#1–5	March 23, 2022	September 14, 2022	Cullen Bunn	Freddie Williams II	
Mighty Morphin Power Rangers/Teenage Mutant Ninja Turtles II	#1–5	December 28, 2022	May 3, 2023	Ryan Parrott	Dan Mora	
Ranger Academy	#1–12	October 4, 2023	November 6, 2024	Maria Ingrande Mora	Jo Mi-Gyeong	
Mighty Morphin Power Rangers: The Return	#1–4	February 7, 2024	May 29, 2024	Amy Jo Johnson and Matt Hutson	Nico Leon	
Godzilla vs. Mighty Morphin Power Rangers II	#1–5	April 3, 2024	September 11, 2024	Cullen Bunn	Baldemar Rivas	
VR Troopers	#1–6	June 25, 2025	January 21, 2026	Mairghread Scott	Sebastián Piriz	
Mighty Morphin Power Rangers/Teenage Mutant Ninja Turtles III	#1–5	August 13, 2025	March 18, 2026	Ryan Parrott	Vincenzo Federici	
Power Rangers Unlimited: Always a Ranger	#1–12	July 1, 2026	Present	Joey Esposito and Kenny Porter	Alessio Zonno	N/A
Power Rangers Green	#1–5	August 5, 2026	December 23, 2026	Paul Allor	Gustaffo Vargas	N/A

=== One-shot issues ===
Title	Publication date	Writer(s)	Artist(s)	Note
Mighty Morphin Power Rangers: Shattered Grid	August 29, 2018	Kyle Higgins	Daniele Di Nicuolo, Diego Galindo and Simona di Gianfelice	
Mighty Morphin Power Rangers 25th Anniversary Special	June 27, 2018	Joe Quinones, Jessica Quinones, Sina Grace, Trey Moore, Mat Groom, Michael Busuttil and Magdalene Visaggio	Joe Quinones, Sina Grace, French Carlomagno, Lucas Werneck and Dajung Lee	
Go Go Power Rangers: Back to School	September 19, 2018	Marguerite Bennett	Ilaria Catalani, Jordan Gibson, Derek Charm, Xiao Tong Kong, Jon Lam, Jim Towe and Joana Lafuente	
Go Go Power Rangers: Forever Rangers	June 19, 2019	Ryan Parrott	Eleonora Carlini and Simona Di Gianfelce	
Free Comic Book Day 2020 – Power Rangers: The Road to Ranger Slayer	July 15, 2020	Ryan Parrott	Dan Mora	
Power Rangers: Ranger Slayer	July 22, 2020	Matthew Erman and Trey Moore	Giuseppe Cafaro	
Power Rangers Unlimited: Heir to Darkness	March 31, 2021	L.L. McKinney	Simone Ragazzoni	
Power Rangers Unlimited: Edge of Darkness	June 30, 2021	Frank Gogol	Simone Ragazzoni	
Power Rangers Unlimited: Countdown to Ruin	June 29, 2022	Marguerite Bennett	Anna Kekovsky Chandra and Giuseppe Cafaro	
Power Rangers Unlimited: The Death Ranger	August 31, 2022	Paul Allor	Katherine Lobo	
Free Comic Book Day 2023 – Ranger Academy Preview	May 6, 2023	Maria Ingrande Mora	Jo Mi-Gyeong	
Power Rangers Unlimited: The Coinless	June 28, 2023	Adam Cesare	Moisés Hidalgo	
Power Rangers Unlimited: Hyperforce	July 19, 2023	Meghan Camarena and Melissa Flores	Federico Sabbatini	
Mighty Morphin Power Rangers 30th Anniversary Special	August 30, 2023	Various		
Power Rangers Unlimited: The Morphin Masters	January 31, 2024	Ryan Parrott and Rachel Wagner	Daniel Bayliss	
Mighty Morphin Power Rangers: Darkest Hour	July 31, 2024	Melissa Flores	Simona Di Gianfelce	
Power Rangers Infinity	August 21, 2024	Sam Humphries	Ro Stein and Ted Brandt	
Mighty Morphin Power Rangers/Usagi Yojimbo (Note: Co-published with Dark Horse Comics and Dogu Publishing.)	September 24, 2024	Ryan Parrott	Shawn Daley	
Power Rangers: Across the Morphin Grid	October 30, 2024	David Yost, J. D. Sutphin, Mat Groom; Meghan Camarena, Nakia Burrise, Steve Cardenas and Walter Jones	Various	
Free Comic Book Day 2025: Power Rangers/VR Troopers	May 3, 2025	Mairghread Scott and Melissa Flores	Sebastián Píriz and Trish Forstner	
Mighty Morphin Power Rangers: Rita's Rewind	August 6, 2025	Zoe Tunnell	Tango	
Mighty Morphin Power Rangers Halloween Special	October 22, 2025	Sina Grace, Danny Lore, Meghan Camarena and Nick Marino	Jodi Nishijima, Juan Romera and Zachary Sterling	
Mighty Morphin Power Rangers: Zord Quest	January 7, 2026	Joey Esposito	Gavin Smith	
Comics' Giveaway Day 2026: Power Rangers #0	May 6, 2026	Various		

=== Graphic novels ===
Title	Release date	Writer(s)	Artist(s)	Note(s)
Saban's Power Rangers: Aftershock	March 27, 2017	Ryan Parrott	Lucas Werneck and Robert Carey	
Power Rangers: Soul of the Dragon	December 5, 2018	Kyle Higgins	Giuseppe Cafaro	
Power Rangers: The Psycho Path	October 9, 2019	Paul Allor	Giuseppe Cafaro	
Power Rangers: Sins of the Future	October 28, 2020	Matthew Erman and Trey Moore	Giuseppe Cafaro	

=== Other ===
- Power Rangers Artist Tribute (2018)

== Collected editions ==
=== Mighty Morphin Power Rangers (vol. 1) ===
Title	Material collected	Year	ISBN
Mighty Morphin Power Rangers Vol. 1	Mighty Morphin Power Rangers #0–4	September 14, 2016	978-1608868933
Mighty Morphin Power Rangers Vol. 2	Mighty Morphin Power Rangers #5–8	March 8, 2017	978-1608869428
Mighty Morphin Power Rangers Vol. 3	Mighty Morphin Power Rangers #9–12	June 7, 2017	978-1608869770
Mighty Morphin Power Rangers Vol. 4	Mighty Morphin Power Rangers #13–16	October 25, 2017	978-1684150311
Mighty Morphin Power Rangers Vol. 5	Mighty Morphin Power Rangers #17–20	April 25, 2018	978-1684151370
Mighty Morphin Power Rangers: Lost Chronicles Vol. 1	Mighty Morphin Power Rangers Annual 2016 & 2017	August 8, 2018	978-1684152193
Mighty Morphin Power Rangers Vol. 6	Mighty Morphin Power Rangers #21–24	September 12, 2018	978-1684152414
Mighty Morphin Power Rangers Vol. 7	Mighty Morphin Power Rangers #25–28	March 20, 2019	978-1684153022
Mighty Morphin Power Rangers Vol. 8	Mighty Morphin Power Rangers #29–30; Might Morphin Power Rangers: Shattered Grid Finale #1	May 1, 2019	978-1684153602
Mighty Morphin Power Rangers: Lost Chronicles Vol. 2	Mighty Morphin Power Rangers Annual 2018; Mighty Morphin Power Rangers 25th Anniversary Special	June 5, 2019	978-1684153381
Mighty Morphin Power Rangers: Shattered Grid	Mighty Morphin Power Rangers #25–30; Mighty Morphin Power Rangers Free Comic Book Day Special; Mighty Morphin Power Rangers: Shattered Grid Finale	August 7, 2019	978-1684153909
Mighty Morphin Power Rangers Vol. 9	Mighty Morphin Power Rangers #31–34	September 18, 2019	978-1684154524
Mighty Morphin Power Rangers Vol. 10	Mighty Morphin Power Rangers #35–39	January 29, 2020	978-1684154876
Mighty Morphin Power Rangers: Beyond the Grid	Mighty Morphin Power Rangers #31–39	May 19, 2020	978-1684155545
Mighty Morphin Power Rangers Vol. 11	Mighty Morphin Power Rangers #40–43	April 15, 2020	978-1684155019
Mighty Morphin Power Rangers Vol. 12	Mighty Morphin Power Rangers #44–47	September 8, 2020	978-1684155521
Mighty Morphin Power Rangers Vol. 13	Mighty Morphin Power Rangers #48–50	November 24, 2020	978-1684156184
Mighty Morphin Power Rangers Vol. 14	Mighty Morphin Power Rangers #51–55	February 16, 2021	978-1684156696

=== Mighty Morphin Power Rangers Archive ===
Title	Material collected	Publication date	ISBN
Mighty Morphin Power Rangers Archive Vol. 1	Mighty Morphin Power Rangers #1–6 (Hamilton Comics, 1994); Mighty Morphin Power Rangers #1–4 (Hamilton Comics, 1995); Mighty Morphin Power Rangers Saga #1–3 (Hamilton Comics, 1995); Mighty Morphin Power Rangers #1–7 (Marvel Comics, 1995); Material from Mighty Morphin Power Rangers: Ninja Rangers/VR Troopers #1–5 (Marvel Comics, 1995)	April 10, 2018	1684151848, 978-1684151844
Mighty Morphin Power Rangers Archive Vol. 2	Power Rangers Zeo #1 (Image Comics, 1996); Power Rangers Super Samurai #1–2 (Papercutz, 2012); Power Rangers Megaforce #3–4 (Papercutz, 2013); Mighty Morphin Power Rangers #1–2 (Papercutz, 2014); Material from Saban Powerhouse: Power Rangers Turbo — Into the Fire and Other Stories (Acclaim Comics, 1997); Material from Saban Powerhouse: Power Rangers Turbo — Simple Simon Says and Other Stories (Acclaim Comics, 1997)	July 3, 2019	1684153131, 978-1684153138

=== Saban's Go Go Power Rangers ===
Title	Material collected	Publication date	ISBN
Saban's Go Go Power Rangers Vol. 1	Saban's Go Go Power Rangers #1–4	July 11, 2018	978-1684151936
Saban's Go Go Power Rangers Vol. 2	Saban's Go Go Power Rangers #5–8	December 12, 2018	978-1684152759
Saban's Go Go Power Rangers Vol. 3	Saban's Go Go Power Rangers #9–12	April 17, 2019	978-1684153299
Saban's Go Go Power Rangers Vol. 4	Saban's Go Go Power Rangers #13–16	July 3, 2019	978-1684153688
Saban's Go Go Power Rangers Vol. 5	Saban's Go Go Power Rangers #17–20	December 4, 2019	978-1684154388
Saban's Go Go Power Rangers Vol. 6	Saban's Go Go Power Rangers: Forever Rangers; Saban's Go Go Power Rangers: Back to School	February 12, 2020	978-1684154852
Saban's Go Go Power Rangers Vol. 7	Saban's Go Go Power Rangers #21–24	June 23, 2020	978-1684155439
Saban's Go Go Power Rangers Vol. 8	Saban's Go Go Power Rangers #25–28	December 29, 2020	978-1684156078
Saban's Go Go Power Rangers Vol. 9	Saban's Go Go Power Rangers #29-32	September 7, 2021	978-1684157686

=== Mighty Morphin Power Rangers/Teenage Mutant Ninja Turtles ===
Title	Material collected	Publication date	ISBN
Mighty Morphin Power Rangers/Teenage Mutant Ninja Turtles	Mighty Morphin Power Rangers/Teenage Mutant Ninja Turtles #1–5	September 29, 2020	ISBN 978-1684155866
Mighty Morphin Power Rangers/Teenage Mutant Ninja Turtles II	Mighty Morphin Power Rangers/Teenage Mutant Ninja Turtles II #1–5	September 13, 2023	ISBN 9781684159970
Mighty Morphin Power Rangers/Teenage Mutant Ninja Turtles III	Mighty Morphin Power Rangers/Teenage Mutant Ninja Turtles III #1–5	May 5, 2026	ISBN 9798892157414

=== Mighty Morphin and Power Rangers ===
Title	Material collected	Publication date	ISBN
Mighty Morphin/Power Rangers: Limited Edition	Mighty Morphin #1; Power Rangers #1	April 20, 2021	1684157013, 978-1684157013
Mighty Morphin: Volume One	Mighty Morphin #1–4	May 11, 2021	978-1684156702
Power Rangers: Volume One	Power Rangers #1–4	May 25, 2021	1684156726, 978-1684156726
Mighty Morphin: Volume Two	Mighty Morphin #5–8	August 17, 2021	1684157021, 978-1684157020
Power Rangers: Volume Two	Power Rangers #5–8	August 24, 2021	1684157056, 978-1684157051
Mighty Morphin: Volume Three	Mighty Morphin #9–12	December 17, 2021	1684157528, 978-1684157525
Power Rangers: Volume Three	Power Rangers #9–12	July 12, 2022	1684157536, 978-1684157532
Mighty Morphin: Volume Four	Mighty Morphin #13–16	June 28, 2022	1646685695, 978-1646685691
Power Rangers: Volume Four	Power Rangers #13–16	June 28, 2022	1684158397, 978-1684158393
Mighty Morphin: Volume Five	Mighty Morphin #17–20	November 8, 2022	1646685695, 978-1646685691
Power Rangers: Volume Five	Power Rangers #17–20	December 27, 2022	1684158397, 978-1684158393
Might Morphin: Volume Six	Might Morphin #21–22; Power Rangers Unlimited: Countdown to Ruin	February 7, 2023	1684158877, 978-1684158874
Power Rangers: Volume Six	Power Rangers #21–22; Power Rangers Unlimited: The Death Ranger	March 14, 2023	1684158915, 978-1684158911

=== Power Rangers Unlimited ===
Title	Material collected	Publication date	ISBN
Power Rangers Unlimited	Power Rangers Unlimited: Heir to Darkness; Power Rangers Unlimited: Edge of Darkness	December 7, 2021	1684157447, 978-1684157440
Power Rangers Unlimited: Call to Darkness	Power Rangers Unlimited: The Coinless; Power Rangers Unlimited: Hyperforce	October 10, 2023	1608861392, 978-1608861392
Power Rangers Unlimited: Forever Rangers	Mighty Morphin Power Rangers 30th Anniversary Special; Power Rangers Unlimited: The Morphin Masters	December 17, 2023	1684155916, 978-1684155910

=== Godzilla vs. Mighty Morphin Power Rangers ===
Title	Material collected	Publication date	ISBN
Godzilla vs. Mighty Morphin Power Rangers	Godzilla vs. Mighty Morphin Power Rangers #1–5	October 18, 2022	1684059372, 978-1684059379
Godzilla vs. Mighty Morphin Power Rangers II	Godzilla vs. Mighty Morphin Power Rangers II #1–5	February 4, 2025	979-8887241661

=== Mighty Morphin Power Rangers (vol. 2) ===
Title	Material collected	Publication date	ISBN
Mighty Morphin Power Rangers: Recharged Vol. 1	Mighty Morphin Power Rangers (vol. 2) #100–102	April 25, 2023	1684158958, 978-1684158959
Mighty Morphin Power Rangers: Recharged Vol. 2	Mighty Morphin Power Rangers (vol. 2) #103–106	August 29, 2023	168415913X, 978-1684159130
Mighty Morphin Power Rangers: Recharged Vol. 3	Mighty Morphin Power Rangers (vol. 2) #107–110	December 26, 2023	1608861066, 978-1608861064
Mighty Morphin Power Rangers: Recharged Vol. 4	Mighty Morphin Power Rangers (vol. 2) #111–114	April 30, 2024	1608861570, 978-1608861576
Mighty Morphin Power Rangers: Recharged Vol. 5	Mighty Morphin Power Rangers (vol. 2) #115–118	September 3, 2024	1608862496, 978-1608861576
Mighty Morphin Power Rangers: Recharged Vol. 6	Mighty Morphin Power Rangers (vol. 2) #119–122; Mighty Morphin Power Rangers: Darkest Hour	November 19, 2024	163796983X, 978-1637969830

=== Ranger Academy ===
Title	Material collected	Publication date	ISBN
Ranger Academy Vol. 1	Ranger Academy #1–4 (plus Free Comic Book Day 2023 prelude)	February 28, 2024	ISBN 9781608861477
Ranger Academy Vol. 2	Ranger Academy #5–8	July 31, 2024	ISBN 9781608862405
Ranger Academy Vol. 3	Ranger Academy #9–12	April 15, 2025	ISBN 9781934506219

=== Power Rangers Prime ===
Title	Material collected	Publication date	ISBN
Power Rangers Prime Vol. 1	Power Rangers Prime #1–4	June 4, 2025	ISBN 9798892153607
Power Rangers Prime Vol. 2	Power Rangers Prime #5–8	November 11, 2025	ISBN 9798892155786
Power Rangers Prime Vol. 3	Power Rangers Prime #9–12	April 28, 2026	ISBN 9798892157315
VR Troopers	VR Troopers #1–6	May 26, 2026	ISBN 9798892158343
Power Rangers Prime Vol. 4	Power Rangers Prime #13–16	July 21, 2026	ISBN 9798892158619

=== Other ===
Title	Material collected	Publication date	ISBN
Mighty Morphin Power Rangers: Pink	Mighty Morphin Power Rangers: Pink #1–6	April 19, 2017	978-1608869527
Justice League/Mighty Morphin Power Rangers	Justice League/Mighty Morphin Power Rangers #1–6	December 6, 2017	1401272002, 978-1401272005
Power Rangers: Drakkon New Dawn	Power Rangers: Ranger Slayer; Power Rangers: Drakkon New Dawn #1-3	March 23, 2021	1684156734, 978-1684156733
Power Rangers Universe	Power Rangers Universe #1–6	October 18, 2022	1684158494, 978-1684158492
Mighty Morphin Power Rangers: The Return	Mighty Morphin Power Rangers: The Return #1–4	December 10, 2024	ISBN 9781684151486
Mighty Morphin Power Rangers: Megazords & Monsters	Mighty Morphin Power Rangers: Rita’s Rewind; Mighty Morphin Power Rangers Halloween Special; Mighty Morphin Power Rangers: Zord Quest	June 23, 2026	ISBN 9798892158459

== See also ==
- Power Rangers (comics)
  - Power Rangers (Boom! Studios)
- List of comics based on Hasbro properties
