= Let's Fish! Hooked On =

2012 video game

- Developer: SIMS Co., Ltd.
- Publishers: JP: Kadokawa Games; NA/EU: Wired Productions
- Platform: PlayStation Vita
- Release: JP: March 29, 2012; NA: January 29, 2013; EU: January 30, 2013
- Genre: Sports
- Mode: Single-player

Let's Fish! Hooked On (Note: Also known in Japan as Let's Try Bass Fishing, FISH ON NEXT.), is a fishing video game developed by SIMS Co., Ltd. for the PlayStation Vita. The game also features character designs from the Japanese animator Poyoyon Rock.

== Plot ==
In the game's story mode, titled "World Tour," the player must battle through Amateur, Professional, and Master Class tournaments to achieve World Champion status. Each of the four characters come with their own story and abilities.

- Ryuji (Akita) (アキタ リュウジ, voiced by Kentaro Ito) is 19 years old and has joined the World Tour to follow in the footsteps of his father, a world-famous fishing champion.
- Jamie (ジェイミー, voiced by Ai Shimizu) is 17 years old and follows her childhood friend Ryuji to the tournament and decides to join it herself after being goaded by Kano.
- Kano (Makise) (マキセ カノ, voiced by Shizuka Ito) is 19 years old and wants to be a champion while making friends at the same time.
- Ai (Shimizu) (シミズ アイ, voiced by Ai Shimizu) is 17 years old and a magical girl who wants to bring world peace through the medium of fishing.

== Gameplay ==
Let's Fish! Hooked On consists of four main game modes:

- World Tour acts as the game's story mode. Players can develop their character's skills and technique in a series of different tournaments.
- Challenge mode contains short fishing-based challenges, as well as online ranking and trophy comparison.
- Training is the practice mode of the game which allow players to fish in any season, time, and stage.
- Underwater allows players to view the fish they have caught and observe their behavior.
