= Charge 'n Blast =

2000 shooter video game

Charge'n Blast
- Developers: CSK Research Institute, SIMS Co., Ltd.
- Publishers: JP: SIMS Co., Ltd.; WW: Xicat Interactive
- Platform: Dreamcast
- Release: JP: December 7, 2000; NA: February 7, 2001; EU: June 29, 2001
- Genre: Shooter
- Modes: Single player, multiplayer

Charge 'n Blast is a video game developed by Sims for Dreamcast in 2000.

== Reception ==
Reception

Aggregate score
Aggregator	Score
Metacritic	68/100

Review scores
Publication	Score
AllGame	2.5/5
Electronic Gaming Monthly	5.17/10 (Note: Three critics of Electronic Gaming Monthly gave the game each a score of 4.5/10, 6/10, and 5/10.)
Famitsu	26/40
GameSpot	5.9/10
GameSpy	8/10
GameZone	9/10
IGN	(US) 7.5/10 (JP) 3.1/10
Next Generation	2/5

The game received "average" reviews according to the review aggregation website Metacritic. Jeff Lundrigan of NextGen said of the game, "If you've got a lot of patience or superhuman hand-eye coordination, by all means give it a try. Otherwise, this wears thin quickly." In Japan, Famitsu gave it a score of 26 out of 40.
