= Hooked! Real Motion Fishing =

2007 video game

- North American box art
- Developer: SIMS
- Publishers: JP: Arc System Works; NA: Aksys Games; EU: 505 Games
- Platform: Wii
- Release: JP: September 27, 2007; NA: October 30, 2007; EU: November 30, 2007
- Genre: Fishing
- Modes: Single-player, multiplayer

Hooked! Real Motion Fishing is a fishing video game developed by SIMS for the Wii, released on October 30, 2007. The game supports Nintendo Wi-Fi Connection and comes with a free fishing rod attachment with the game's purchase. Players can fish in six different locations using four casting methods, and can also play online with up to four people.
