= Tom & Jerry (1989 video game) =

- Developer: Magic Bytes
- Publisher: Magic Bytes
- Series: Tom and Jerry
- Platforms: Amiga; Atari ST; Commodore 64
- Release: May 9, 1989
- Genre: Platform
- Mode: Single-player

Tom & Jerry (also known as Tom & Jerry: Hunting High and Low) is a 1989 platform game developed and published by German company Magic Bytes. It is the first video game based on the cartoon of the same name, and was released in the United States and Europe, for Amiga, Atari ST, and Commodore 64 computers.

Another game with identical gameplay, Tom & Jerry 2, was released in Europe later in 1989. Tom & Jerry 2 (also by Magic Bytes) was published for the same systems as the original game, plus the MSX, Amstrad CPC, and ZX Spectrum.

== Gameplay ==
Tom & Jerry is a platform game. Playing as Jerry, a mouse, the player travels around five rooms in a house to search for cheese. The player has a time limit to consume all the cheese and must also evade Tom, a cat who wants to harm Jerry. If Tom grabs Jerry, the player loses 30 seconds of time. The player loses if the time limit runs out before all the cheese can be consumed.

As in the cartoon, Jerry can use a variety of items against Tom. This includes bowling balls and vases that can be dropped on Tom's head from a shelf, and banana peels which can be laid on the floor for Tom to slip. Reaching a shelf requires the player to jump on a sofa, propelling Jerry into the air. The player can also activate a radio or television to distract Tom. To evade Tom, the player can also enter mouse holes which lead Jerry through tunnels, played as a continuously scrolling sub-game. While in the tunnels, the player must evade bombs that are thrown inside by Tom. The player can also collect cheese in the tunnels to restore lost time. The tunnels connect to each room in the house.

== Reception ==
Reception

Review scores
Publication	Score
ACE	179/1000 (Amiga)
Zzap!64	27% (Amiga); 43% (C64)
Amiga Computing	51% (Amiga)
Amiga Joker	57% (Tom & Jerry 2)
Amiga User International	25% (Amiga)
CU Amiga-64	26% (Amiga); 25% (C64)
The Games Machine	47% (Amiga); 45% (Atari ST); 41% (C64)
.info	3/5 (Amiga/C64)
Power Play	32/100 (Amiga)

Several critics declared the game a disappointment, and Andy Smith of ACE stated that fans of the cartoon would be disappointed with the game as well.

Tom & Jerry received praise for its graphics, particularly on the Amiga, while reviewers for Zzap!64 found the C64 version to be graphically superior. The Games Machine considered the C64 version to be the worst, criticizing the "bright garish backdrops" and stating that Jerry is depicted as being nearly as big as Tom. Amiga User International (AUI) was critical of the graphics and sound. Some critics stated that the Amiga version had superior music over the C64 version, although Mark Heley of CU Amiga-64 opined that the Amiga version contained a poor imitation of the Tom & Jerry theme music.

The gameplay was criticized by reviewers who found it to be boring and repetitive. Gordon Hamlett of Your Amiga stated "there isn't actually any point to the game and I mean that quite literally. There is no scoring at all involved so you never know how well you have done." AUI criticized the "weak game design". The sluggish controls were also criticized. Tom Malcom of .info wrote that trying to move Jerry "is like trying to swim through Jello: it can be done but it's more hard work than fun." Smith described the game as being nearly unplayable. Heley described the gameplay as a bad combination of "very dull" and "very difficult."

Tom & Jerry 2 received criticism for reusing elements from the original game. Carsten Borgmeier of Amiga Joker criticized the lack of improved control, and considered the sequel to be a clone of the original.
