= Gorby no Pipeline Daisakusen =

1991 video game

- Famicom version box art
- Developer: Compile
- Publisher: Tokuma Shoten
- Platforms: Famicom; MSX2; FM Towns
- Release: JP: 12 April 1991 (Family Computer); JP: April 1991 (MSX2 and FM Towns)
- Genre: Puzzle

Gorubī no Paipurain Daisakusen (Japanese: ゴルビーのパイプライン大作戦; lit. Gorby's Great Pipeline Strategy) is a falling-block puzzle video game developed by Compile for the MSX2, Famicom, and FM Towns. It was published by Tokuma Shoten in 1991.

In the game, the player assembles water pipe segments for a pipeline from Moscow to Tokyo in order to strengthen Japan–Soviet Union relations. The game was conceived by Masato Wakabayashi.

With permission of the Soviet embassy, the game and its promotional materials feature the name and likeness of Mikhail Gorbachev, who was President of the Soviet Union at the time of the game's development and release. The cover art of the game featuring Gorbachev was created by Takamasa Shimaura (島浦孝全).

Two months after Tokuma Shoten released Gorubī no Pipeline Daisakusen in Japan, Sega published Ganbare Gorubī! (がんばれゴルビー!) for the Game Gear handheld game console. Both games were released in Japan several months before the dissolution of the Soviet Union.

The Famicom version was re-released on iOS through the PicoPico service and Windows through Project Egg in 2021, although references to Gorbachev have been removed or censored, including a game name change to Pipeline Daisakusen (パイプライン大作戦, Paipurain Daisakusen; lit. Great Pipeline Strategy).

== Gameplay ==
Gameplay in the MSX2 version

In this falling-block puzzle game, a small girl—wearing a Russian national costume of sarafan, kokoshnik, and valenki—kicks tiles representing segments of water pipe down a two-dimensional, vertical shaft; this shaft is the field of play. A second girl, also in national costume, waves semaphore flags to give the impression that she guides the placement of the tiles.

The player must quickly rotate and place the tiles to catch and conduct a stream of water from a pipe on one side of the shaft to a pipe on the other side. When the player successfully links an inflow pipe on one side of the shaft to one of the outflow pipes on the other side, the tiles of the complete pipeline disappear, and the player earns points.

=== Advancement ===
If the player succeeds in clearing enough tiles, the player proceeds to the next game stage. Completion of the first stage builds a pipeline that crosses the Sea of Japan to link Tokyo to the Russian mainland. From there, each completed stage extends the pipeline further north or west across Russia. Upon completion of the ninth stage, the pipeline reaches Moscow, and the level is complete. The player advances to stage one of level two. There are nine stages to each level. With each increase in game level, pipe segments fall faster.

=== Game over ===
If the player routes the water to a dead end, then the inflow pipe is abandoned, and the player must start building a new pipeline from the next unblocked inflow pipe. If all inflow pipes become blocked by tiles, or if a stack of pipe segments reaches the ledge at the top of the shaft, then the small girl leaps down the shaft and collapses, and the game ends.

== Music ==
The background music for each level is a rendition of a Russian classical music composition. Selections include "The Great Gate of Kiev", the final movement from Mussorgsky's suite Pictures at an Exhibition (1874); "Swan's Theme" from Tchaikovsky's ballet Swan Lake (1876); and "Flight of the Bumblebee", an interlude from Rimsky-Korsakov's opera The Tale of Tsar Saltan (1900).

== See also ==
- Tetris (1985)
- Pipe Mania (1989)
