= Pet Club: Neko Daisuki! =

1996 video game

- Developer(s): Sega
- Publisher(s): Sega
- Platform(s): Game Gear
- Release: JP: July 19, 1996
- Genre(s): Simulation
- Mode(s): Single-player

Pet Club: Neko Daisuki! (ペット倶楽部 ねこ大すき！, Pet Cat Club Hiroshi Suki!) is a video game released in Japan for the Game Gear. It is similar to Pet Club: Inu Daisuki! except it deals with taking care of a newborn kitten (from its birth until it reaches maturity) instead of a puppy. The game is part of Kid's Gear collection of titles for a younger audience.

There is a cameo to Sonic the Hedgehog in one of the playable rooms in the game.

== Gameplay ==
Playing with a cat in the player's virtual bedroom.

Like the dogs utilized in the Inu Daisuki! game, the cats in this game can become very aloof if neglected or given an excessive amount of training.

Training elements include following a toy mouse in addition to going for a walk in the city park. All cats are categorized by their name, their age (in years and months), amongst other traits. Players can also discipline their animal, leave the room (either with or without the cat), or give their kitten a pet. A battery backup allows dogs to stop playing at any time and resume taking care of their cat throughout any section of the game.
