= Tom and Jerry: The Movie (video game) =

1992 video game

- Master system cover art
- Developer: SIMS
- Publisher: Sega
- Platforms: Master System, Game Gear
- Release: Master System: EU: October 1, 1992; Game Gear: NA: July 14, 1993; EU: 1993; JP: June 25, 1993
- Genre: Platform
- Mode: Single-player

Tom and Jerry: The Movie (トム＆ジェリー ザ ムービー), also known as Tom and Jerry, is a platform game developed by SIMS and published by Sega in 1992 for the Master System. In 1993, the game was converted to the Game Gear with completely different stages, but the same gameplay. The game was released to coincide with the film of the same name, but has no relevance to the film's content.

== Plot ==
In the Master System version, Tom adventurously chases Jerry inside the house, outside, through the country then back inside the house, ending with Tom finally catching Jerry. In the Game Gear version, Tom chases Jerry on a quest to look for a hidden treasure, taking them from the house all the way to an island where the treasure is buried.

== Gameplay ==
The player controls Tom in the game. He chases Jerry through lengthy stages, hindered by Jerry who lays explosive traps and goes under platforms. Tom can climb platforms, jump gaps, and pounce. Ideally, Jerry can be caught at the end of the level by solving a puzzle, but it is possible to catch Jerry earlier in the level with great difficulty. Once Jerry is caught, the level ends and proceeds to the next one.

== Release ==
The game was released on Master System in 1992, Game Gear in 1993, Game Boy on October 2, 1993, and on Genesis more than two months later.

Reception

Review score
Publication	Score	
Publication	Game Gear	Master System
Sega Force	48%	77%
