= VR Troopers =

Television series

- Genre: Science fiction Superhero; Action-adventure; Tokusatsu
- Created by: Haim Saban; Shuki Levy; Toei Company
- Based on: Metal Hero Series by Toei Company
- Starring: Brad Hawkins; Sarah Brown; Michael Bacon; David Carr; Gardner Baldwin; Richard Rabago; Julian Combs; Michael Sorich; Aaron Pruner; Zeb
- Voices of: Gardner Baldwin; Kerrigan Mahan; Michael Sorich; Mike Reynolds; Richard Epcar; Dave Mallow
- Composers: Shuki Levy; Haim Saban; Jeremy Sweet; Ron Wasserman
- Countries of origin: United States; Japan
- Original language: English
- No. of seasons: 2
- No. of episodes: 92 (list of episodes)

Production
- Executive producers: Haim Saban; Shuki Levy
- Producer: Robert Hughes
- Production locations: California (Santa Clarita & Los Angeles); Japan (Saitama, Kyoto, Yokohama and Tokyo)
- Running time: 30 minutes
- Production companies: Saban Entertainment; Toei Company; Cyberprod, Inc.

Original release
- Network: Broadcast syndication
- Release: September 3, 1994 – February 21, 1996

Related
- Big Bad Beetleborgs

VR Troopers is a syndicated live-action superhero-adventure television series produced and distributed by Saban Entertainment from 1994 to 1996. The show tried to profit from the fascination with virtual reality in the mid-1990s as well as the success of Saban's other property, Power Rangers. VR Troopers was the first "sister series" to Mighty Morphin Power Rangers. Much like Power Rangers, it was an Americanization of a Japanese tokusatsu children's program series by Toei Company. The series is a co-production of Toei and Cyberprod.

The show featured early CGI and video effects mixed with Japanese stock footage from three different Metal Hero Series: Metalder, Spielban and Shaider. In 2010, the copyright for VR Troopers was transferred from BVS Entertainment to Saban Capital Group. In 2018, the rights were transferred to Hasbro, as part of the acquisition of the Power Rangers brand, which included related intellectual property and content libraries previously owned by Saban Properties.

The show was canceled after only two seasons primarily because the available Japanese footage was quickly exhausted. Its successor, Big Bad Beetleborgs, another Saban adaptation of a Metal Heroes series, was cancelled for the same reason. The show spawned a toyline and a video game for the Sega Genesis and Game Gear.

== Plot ==
The show focused on three teenagers in their late teens, Ryan Steele, Kaitlin Star, and J.B. Reese, living in the fictional West Coast town of Cross World City, California. They regularly attended and were teachers at "Tao's Dojo", a karate studio. Ryan was the most focused martial artist; J.B. was the computer wizard; while Kaitlin was a photojournalist for the local newspaper, the Underground Voice Daily.

One day, Ryan's search for his long-missing father led him and his two friends to a strange laboratory. Inside, a digitized head of Professor Horatio Hart (who is a friend of Ryan's father Tyler) explained the truth about his life's work of having developed extremely advanced virtual reality technology in secret. "VR" is a dimension existing alongside our own; within it lie mutants, aiming at conquering both worlds. The main ruler of these is a creature known as Grimlord, who, unbeknownst to anyone on Earth, has a human identity as billionaire industrialist Karl Ziktor. As Karl Ziktor tries to overcome the barriers of the true reality to allow his armies easy passage from the virtual world, the responsibility of defending the planet on both sides of the dimensional barrier falls on Ryan, Kaitlin and J.B.. They have assistance in the form of armored bodies having incredible firepower. This includes eventual additions to their arsenal, such as a Turbo Cycle, Techno Bazooka, VR Troopertron, VR Shoulder Cannon, VR Battlecruiser/Interceptor and a flying, laser-blasting Skybase.

Among other regular characters on the show, Zeb as Jeb, Ryan's hound dog that, after an accident in Professor Hart's lab, becomes capable of human speech; Woody Stocker, Kaitlin's wacky hat-loving boss at the Underground Voice Daily; Percival "Percy" Rooney, the local mayor's nephew and Kaitlin's bumbling rival reporter; and Tao, the wise martial arts sensei who owns the dojo and a family friend of the Steele Family. Recurring villains include General Ivar, Colonel Icebot, Decimator, the Skugs and others throughout.

During the second season, Ryan's father Tyler was found and restored to normal. He then left to help on the government research into virtual reality-based technology. Ryan received new V.R. armor and an upgrade to his powers. Grimlord's base of operations changed the virtual dungeon to a large spacecraft which used mostly US footage and added new Generals such as Oraclon, Despera, Doom Master and his Vixens. The Skugs now had the ability to become more powerful in the form of Ultra Skugs.

== Cast and characters ==
- Brad Hawkins as Ryan Steele
- Sarah Brown as Kaitlin Star
- Michael Hollander (credited as Michael Bacon) as J. B. Reese
- Gardner Baldwin as Ziktor/Grimlord
- Julian Combs as Professor Hart
- Richard Rabago as Tao
- Michael Sorich as Woody
- Aaron Pruner as Percy

== Production ==
=== Pre-production ===
In pre-production, the series was known as Psycon and Cybertron, focusing on a single hero with a technological theme instead of a team of heroes with a virtual reality theme.

In the Psycon pilot script, the main character was Adam Steele, who merged with the cyborg Psycon rather than transforming into it. The enemy was Grimlord, whose alter ego was Cyrus Ritker, who led a robot army known as Cyberdrones. Cyrus had a son called Percy who was Adam's martial arts rival. Adam's mentor and caretaker was a martial arts sensei called Tao. Adam was friends with Tao's daughter Mia, and a younger person called Mouse MacKenzie.

The Cybertron pilot starred Jason David Frank as Adam Steele and drew its source footage from Metalder. Frank's character was depicted as a solo hero going up against an army of robots known as Wardrones who were led by Grimlord. Grimlord's alter ego in the pilot was Cyrus Rikter (Gardner Baldwin), who had a son named Percy, who was Adam's martial arts rival. Tao Chong (Richard Rabago) served as Adam's caretaker and mentor. Tao also had a daughter named Mia and Doug Sloan played the part of Tyler Steele in flashbacks. The pilot included a pair of bumbling news reporters named Elmo (played by Jamie Kennedy) and Scuzzy, who would have served as the series' comic relief. Its theme song was based on Ron Wasserman's "Go Green/White Ranger Go" song in the Power Rangers series.

=== VR Troopers ===
Like Power Rangers, VR Troopers used a combination of American footage spliced with fight scenes from Japanese shows. The Japanese shows adapted in to VR Troopers are Shaider, Spielban, and Metalder. All three come from Toei's Metal Hero Series. Metalder provided footage of Ryan Steele's season one robotic suit, Grimlord, the Virtual Dungeon, Grimlord's four lieutenants, Dark Heart, and the military-type robots that are featured in several episodes, as well as the exterior of Ziktor Industries. Spielban provided footage of J.B.'s and Kaitlin's robotic suits, Ivar, Icebot, skugs, and the battle scenes involving the Skybase, shark cruisers, tanks, and fighter jets. Space Sheriff Shaider provided the new footage for season two, including Ryan Steele's season two robotic suit and the ultra-skugs.

Out of all of Saban's tokusatsu adaptations, VR Troopers uses the oldest source-footage of any series. Shaider was aired from 1984 to early 1985, making it 10 years old when first used for VR Troopers in 1995; Spielban was aired from 1986 to early 1987, making it eight years old when originally used in 1994; and Metalder was originally aired in 1987 to early 1988, making it seven years old when it was adapted in 1994.

Because more than one Japanese show was used in an episode at any given time, Ryan's alter-ego was never in the same action scene as JB or Kaitlin's, since they were taken from two different shows. Due to this, many episodes involved a plot device to separate Ryan from the other two, forcing them to fight separately. Almost every episode ended with either Ryan or JB (sometimes both) destroying the monster of the day (Kaitlin never got to destroy any on her own), at which point his missing comrade(s) would come running up to inquire how the fight went. The only time the group fought "together" or in battle grid mode was all original American footage, with the Battle Grid suits being low-quality spandex and the helmets simple recolors of the Red Mighty Morphin Power Ranger's. For the show's first season, there was almost never any original American footage outside of the Battle Grid. Similar to Power Rangers, more U.S. fights were featured in the show's second season.

VR Troopers as an adaptation is different in many ways from Power Rangers and Big Bad Beetleborgs. Because it was syndicated (instead of broadcast on Fox Kids like the former two), the monsters were destroyed more violently; mutant/robot destructions included the monster being split in half, impaled, etc. None of the VR Trooper forms were given names since none of them had one main color.

All three of the Metal Hero shows used in the series contained scenes of humans fighting humans. Because the fights featured close-ups of Japanese actors, it was deemed unusable. Distance shots of Japanese actors from Shaider were usable in some of the fights, and battles with the monster footage were also kind of limited (splicing up to 2–3 episodes), but otherwise such footage was limited. In addition, because many episodes of fight footage from Metalder/Shaider and Spielban were being used in a single episode, viable footage was used more quickly.

In Season 1, the show would open with the traditional "Today on Saban's VR Troopers" teaser, showing scenes from the episode and narrated by Dave Mallow. After the "Quest For Power" mini-series in Season 2, however, Ryan, Kaitlin, or J.B. took over the part and narrated the teaser (in first-person).

Various voice actors were listed under different pseudonyms in this series. For example, in the Season 1 end credits, Kerrigan Mahan was credited under his pseudonym, Ryan O'Flannigan (which was also the name credited for doing the voice of Goldar in the early seasons of Mighty Morphin Power Rangers); in Season 2, he would be credited under his real name and was properly identified as Jeb's voiceover. Likewise, Richard Epcar was occasionally listed in the end credits under a pseudonym of his own, Richard George (although he was credited under his real name for the first two episodes of the series), and Mike Reynolds was credited under the name Ray Michaels.

== Home media ==
In the U.S., five VHS videos were released: "Lost Memories", "Oh Brother", "Computer Captive", "Error in the System", and "Virtual V6". Each VHS release contained a bonus music video.

In the U.K., two videos were released through PolyGram Video and 4 Front Video (a subsidiary of PolyGram). Vol. 1 contained "The Battle Begins: Parts 1 and 2" and Vol. 2 contains "Battle For The Books" and "Katlin's Little Helper". In the 2000s, four DVDs were released by FOX Kids Europe/Jetix Europe and Maximum Entertainment Ltd. They included three single disc Volumes and a Mega-Disc DVD that contained eight various episodes that were released across the first three volumes and a couple of episodes that were not released on any of the three previous discs.

In 2011, all episodes of VR Troopers were made available on Netflix until February 1, 2021. In 2015, episodes were available on Kabillion, a video-on-demand service. Tubi began streaming the series in 2025 and is also currently available on Roku as of May 2025.

In 2012, VR Troopers, along with other Saban productions such as Power Rangers, Big Bad Beetleborgs, and Ninja Turtles: The Next Mutation, was released on DVD through a deal signed by Shout! Factory and Saban Brands. VR Troopers: Season 1, Volume 1 was released on DVD on October 2. In 2013, Shout! Factory released VR Troopers: Season 1, Volume 2 on DVD on January 8, followed by VR Troopers: Season 2, Volume 1 on May 14. VR Troopers: Season 2, Volume 2 on DVD was scheduled for release by Shout! Factory on September 10, 2013, but due to poor sales of the first three volumes, the release was cancelled. Season 2, Volume 2 was eventually released as a Shout! Select title on January 14, 2014.

DVD name	Ep #	Release date
VR Troopers: Season 1, Part 1	26	October 2, 2012
VR Troopers: Season 1, Part 2	26	January 8, 2013
VR Troopers: Season 2, Part 1	20	May 14, 2013
VR Troopers: Season 2, Part 2	20	January 14, 2014

== Other media ==
=== Comics ===
In 1995, Marvel Comics published a flipbook five issues miniseries entitled Mighty Morphin Power Rangers: Ninja Rangers/VR Troopers which featured the Power Rangers on one side and the VR Troopers on the other.

In the Mighty Morphin Power Rangers issue #53, Ryan, Kaitlin and JB's names were mentioned as candidates for the Green Ranger.

The team made their appearance in the Power Rangers Prime comic series from BOOM! Studios. In 2025, BOOM! Studios launched a VR Troopers miniseries, written by Mairghread Scott.

=== Games ===
- Jeb's Rescue, Ryan's Challenge, and JB's Battle, three games for MGA's Game Wizard
- VR Troopers – When Worlds Collide, a handheld game by Tiger
- VR Troopers, a 1995 video game for the Sega Genesis and Game Gear
- Saban's VR Troopers, a board game by Milton Bradley
