= Tom and Jerry in House Trap =

2000 video game

- PAL region cover art
- Developer: Warthog Games
- Publishers: NA: NewKidCo; EU: Ubi Soft
- Platform: PlayStation
- Release: NA: November 21, 2000; EU: November 20, 2000; JP: September 19, 2002
- Genre: Action
- Modes: Single-player, multiplayer

Tom and Jerry in House Trap is an action video game based on the Tom and Jerry franchise, and was released in 2000 for the PlayStation. The game was developed by Warthog Games and was published by NewKidCo in North America. In Europe, the game was published by Ubi Soft and NewKidCo. Success published a Japanese version of the game in 2002.

== Gameplay ==
Tom and Jerry is a game similar to Spy vs Spy, the player must set up traps and collect weapons around the house to attack Tom. Each of the weapons and fifteen areas are based on shorts from the original Hanna-Barbara era of the franchise. The game also offers multiplayer.

== Reception ==
The game received negative reviews from critics, with IGN giving the title a 4/10 score, primarily criticizing its gameplay.

Reception

Review scores
Publication	Score
IGN	4/10
PlayStation: The Official Magazine	1/10
The Guardian	3/5
