= Taz-Mania (video game) =

1992 video game

- North American Sega Genesis box art
- Developers: Recreational Brainware (MD); NuFX (GG); Technical Wave (MS); Visual Concepts (SNES); David A. Palmer Productions (GB); Beam Software (GB)
- Publishers: Sega (MD, GG, MS); Sunsoft (SNES (North America), GB); THQ, (SNES (PAL regions), GB (Taz-Mania 2))
- Director: Yohsuke Sakaushi (MS)
- Producer: Satoshi Namekawa (MS)
- Designers: Burt Sloane, Jonathan Miller, Dave Foley (MD/GEN); Mac Senour (GG); Michael Mendheim (SNES)
- Programmers: John Siegesmund (GG); Burt Sloane, Jonathan Miller, Dave Foley (MD/GEN); Yohsuke Sakaushi (MS); Scott Patterson (SNES)
- Artists: Alan Murphy, Marilyn Churchill (MD/GEN); Akira Takahashi, Kakuya Osanai (MS); Leandro Penazola (SNES)
- Composers: Mark Miller, Jim Hedges (MD); John Siegesmund (GG); Takashi Masuzaki, Satoshi Namekawa, Kouichi Shimamura (MS); Mitchell Stein (SNES)
- Platforms: Mega Drive/Genesis, Master System, Game Gear, Game Boy, Super Nintendo Entertainment System
- Release: Mega Drive: NA/EU: July 1992; Master System: EU: December 10, 1992; Game Gear: NA: October 1992; EU: December 1992; Super Nintendo: NA: May 1993; EU: 1993; Game Boy: NA: September 1994 (Taz-Mania), January 1997 (Taz-Mania 2); EU: 1993 (Taz-Mania 2), 1994 (Taz-Mania)
- Genres: Action, Adventure
- Mode: Single-player

Taz-Mania is the name of several video games based on the Taz-Mania cartoon series. A 2D side-scrolling platform/adventure video game developed by Recreational Brainware and published by Sega on the Sega Mega Drive/Genesis in 1992. Different games were also developed by NuFX and released on the Game Gear and by Technical Wave on the Master System. Other different Taz-Mania games were also published by Sunsoft in North America and by THQ in PAL territories and released on the SNES and 2 games on the Game Boy were made too. One from David A. Palmer Productions and published by Sunsoft and another one called Taz-Mania 2 from Beam Software and published by THQ.

== Plot ==
The plot of the Mega Drive/Genesis game was actually a twist on the usual "Save the World" story setting for many platform/adventure games. One evening, Hugh Tazmanian Devil was telling his three children (Taz, his sister Molly and his brother Jake) an intriguing tale: Once there were giant seabirds that laid eggs which could feed a family of Tazmanian devils for over a year. There are legends that somewhere along the island of Tasmania, there is a Lost Valley, where the giant seabirds still nest. Taz becomes fascinated by the prospect of a potentially large omelet and leaves in search for one of those giant eggs. Thus, the player must direct Taz across various stages in search for the Lost Valley and its Giant Bird.

== Gameplay ==
In the Mega Drive/Genesis version players control Taz as he searches for the giant egg. Taz is able to jump, spin into a tornado and eat various objects. Spinning into a tornado allows Taz to defeat most enemies, as well as gain extra jump distance, knock away items and get past certain obstacles unharmed. Taz has the ability to eat most, if not all items throughout the level, such as health recovering food items, extra lives and continues. Eating some chilli peppers allows Taz to breathe fire in order to defeat stronger enemies, while eating a star grants Taz temporary invincibility. Other items, such as bombs and weed killer can be thrown at enemies, but will damage Taz if he eats them.

== Development ==
San Francisco-based Recreational Brainware was led by two programmers, Burt Sloane and Jonathan Miller, who were given the game for their work in both Spider-Man vs. The Kingpin and the GEMS (Genesis Editor for Music & Sound effects) software tool which they developed alongside Miller's brother Mark and Chris Grigg. Sloane refined his development tools built for Spider-Man, with technical innovations for level layouts and animation that wound up used in further Genesis games. One such breakthrough was a sprite-based tool which Sloane called the “compositor", that constructed animation frames by combining and positioning parts of pixels, allowing Taz to have a large number of facial expressions.

A semi-sequel to this game in design and concept but unrelated to the Taz-Mania cartoon series was also released by Sega on the same platforms in between 1994 and 1997, entitled Taz in Escape from Mars. An official sequel titled Taz-Mania 2 was planned with an isometric viewpoint, but was never put into development. This is not to be confused with the THQ published Taz-Mania 2 on the Game Boy, which is a standard platform game.

== Reception ==
Reception

Review scores
Publication	Score
Consoles +	GB: 81%
Total!	GB & SNES: 55%
Video Games (DE)	SGG: 61%
VideoGames & Computer Entertainment	SMD & SNES: 7/10
Entertainment Weekly	B
MegaTech	SMD: 82%
Mega Play	SMD: 7.75/10
Super Control	SNES: 78%
Sega Force	SMD: 96%
Sega Power	SMD: 89%
Sega Pro	SGG: 92%

The Mega Drive version was a bestseller in the UK for 2 months. Mega placed the game at #19 in their Top Mega Drive Games of All Time. Mean Machines magazines gave the game an overall score of 81 out of 100 praising the graphics as "visually one of the most stunning megadrive games yet", also praising the game animation although there was criticism on the game difficulty as being too easy concluding "An enjoyable and visually exciting platform game which may not be tough enough for hardened platform veterans, but is still worth a look."
