= The Majors: Pro Baseball =

1992 video game

- Developers: I.T.L Co., Ltd.
- Publisher: Sega
- Platform: Game Gear
- Release: NA: December 1992
- Genre: Sports (baseball)
- Modes: Single-player, multiplayer

The Majors: Pro Baseball is a 1992 baseball video game developed by I.T.L and published by Sega for the Game Gear. It features battery-based save and the Major League Baseball Players Association license.

== Summary ==
The teams themselves are not licensed and are only listed by the city name. The umpire's calls are notable for being uttered with a Japanese accent. The game contains the following modes: Exhibition, Versus Play, Pennant/Season and Edit.

Players can play a regular season lasting anywhere from 32 to 162 games. After every game, the regular season can be saved for future purposes. This video game uses the rosters from the 1992 Major League Baseball season, and it allows the player to create up to two custom teams composed of any of the players from any of the teams in the game. The teams are stored on the cartridge and can be played in Exhibition Mode.

== Reception ==
Allgame rated the game 3 out of 5 in its overview. Ação Games offered high praise, awarding it a 92% score. Electronic Gaming Monthly gave it a more moderate 65 out of 100, while Germany's Mega Fun magazine scored the title at 77 out of 100.
