= Factory Panic =

1991 action video game

- The box art for Factory Panic, the version of the game released in European countries
- Developer: Japan System House
- Publisher: Sega
- Platform: Game Gear
- Release: JP: 21 June 1991; BR: 1991; EU: 1991
- Genre: Action

Factory Panic, originally titled Ganbare Gorubī (Japanese: がんばれゴルビー!), is an action game developed by Japan System House for the Game Gear handheld game console, and published by Sega in 1991. In Brazil, Tec Toy retitled the game to Crazy Company.

In Ganbare Gorubī, the original Japanese version of the game, the player character ("Gorby") is patterned after Mikhail Gorbachev, who was President of the Soviet Union at the time of the game's development and release. As Gorby, the player must use a system of conveyor belts to send goods to people queueing outside a factory.

In Factory Panic, the European version of the game and Crazy Company, the Brazilian version, the player character is instead a blond-haired boy. A corrupt business magnate called Mister Greede has been withholding food and other necessities from the people of Segaville. The player infiltrates Mr. Greede's factory to distribute goods to the waiting citizens.

Sega released Ganbare Gorubī in Japan two months after Tokuma Shoten released their Gorbachev-inspired game, Gorby's Pipeline Plan (ゴルビーのパイプライン大作戦, Gorubī no Paipurain Daisakusen), for the Famicom video game console. Both games were released in Japan several months before the dissolution of the Soviet Union.

== Gameplay ==
As bread, meat, medical supplies, Game Gears, and other objects travel on conveyor belts, a queue of people in need wait outside a fence at the bottom of the screen. Each person needs one specific thing. By rerouting the right thing at the right time, Gorby can send it to the person, who then goes away happy.

In some levels, Gorby (in the original Japanese) or the unnamed blond-haired boy (in all other versions) steps on a switch to rotate a conveyor belt junction; in other levels, Gorby or the boy rearranges conduits to make or break links between conveyor belts. To give each person what they are waiting for, Gorby or the boy must step on switches or place conduits quickly enough to route the goods on the network of conveyor belts—while also fending off the factory's security guards. He must also avoid sending the people hazards, like moldy bread or poison.

Once Gorby or the boy has delivered the required item to each person in the queue, he advances to a more challenging game level.

== See also ==
- Gorby no Pipeline Daisakusen (1991)
- Internationalization and localization
