= Super Columns =

1995 video game

- European box art
- Developer(s): Sega
- Publisher(s): Sega
- Composer(s): Tatsuyuki Maeda
- Series: Columns
- Platform(s): Game Gear
- Release: EU: 1995; JP: May 26, 1995; NA: June 5, 1995
- Genre(s): Puzzle
- Mode(s): Single-player

Super Columns is a 1995 puzzle video game developed and published by Sega for the Game Gear. It was later included on the Coleco Sonic, along with the original Columns, to which it is a sequel.

== Gameplay ==
Super Columns enhances the original Columns gameplay by adding new types of blocks and the ability to rotate the lines of blocks horizontally. New blocks include glitter columns (which remove gems of a certain type from the grid), reversal columns (which flip the grid upside-down), magic columns (which clears all gems above a section), and lanterns (which can clear a whole row, column, or grid).

The main gameplay mode is "Story," wherein the player is pitted against an evil merchant, Surhand, who wants to harness the power of a mystical amulet in order to conquer all of Phoenicia. The player must defeat five opponents thrice each in order to advance in the game. During story matches, both the player and the player's opponents can unleash various spells, indicated by a numbered display that ascends as gems are matched. Each spell has a different effect, such as increasing the speed at which opponent columns fall, or restricting the opponent's ability to rotate their columns. Like in previous Columns games, there are also "Endless" and "Flash" modes available. In an "Endless" game, the player matches gems until inevitably reaching a game-over. "Flash" mode presents the player with 10 puzzle stages where all flashing gems must be matched in order to progress to the next stage.

== Reception ==
GamePro gave Super Columns a positive review. They praised the variety of addictive game modes, simple controls, and clean graphics.

== See also ==
- Tetris 2
