= Fred Couples Golf =

1994 video game

- Japanese cover art
- Developer: SIMS Co., Ltd.
- Publisher: Sega
- Composer: Yoko Wada
- Platform: Game Gear
- Release: NA: 1994; JP: December 23, 1994
- Genre: Sports
- Modes: Single-player, multiplayer

Fred Couples Golf is a 1994 golf video game for the Game Gear featuring professional golfer Fred Couples. A 32X sequel, Golf Magazine: 36 Great Holes Starring Fred Couples, was released in 1995.

== Gameplay ==
In-game screenshot

The player chooses from four generic golf courses and must compete in either a tournament, stroke play, or match play. Each golfer has their unique strengths and weaknesses. Names can be changed in addition to shirt color and the difficulty level. Through a Game Gear link, four players can play at once. Fred Couples, the golfer that endorsed the game, can only be used as an opponent. He is not available as either a teammate or as a playable character.

While the ball is on the ground, the player is shown an overhead view and must analyze it before swinging the golf club. The player can also choose a caddie as well. A password is given every time the player advances in the tournament.

== Reception ==
GamePro gave the game a mostly negative review. Though they praised many of the game's elements, such as the practice mode, the animations, and the controls, they found the graphical layout to be a fatal flaw, and concluded "Golfing fiends may enjoy the strong details in Fred Couples Golf, but the tiny, cramped graphical layout will assault the senses of casual hackers."
