= Power Rangers Prime =

2024 American comic book series

- Issue #1's cover A by Dan Mora.

Publication information
- Publisher: Boom! Studios
- Genre: Science fiction, superhero
- Publication date: November 13, 2024 – April 8, 2026
- No. of issues: 16
- Main characters: Power Rangers; VR Troopers

Creative team
- Written by: Melissa Flores
- Artists: Simona Di Gianfelice; Federico Sorresa; Michael Yg
- Letterer: Ed Dukeshire
- Colorist: Fabi Marques
- Editors: Tea Fougner; Allyson Gronowitz; David Mariotte

Power Rangers Prime is an American comic book series written by Melissa Flores, with art by Michael Yg and Fabi Marques. The series debuted on November 13, 2024, and concluded on April 8, 2026, being published by Boom! Studios.

Based on the Power Rangers franchise by Hasbro, which is also based on the Super Sentai franchise by Toei Company, the series is set in a rebooted continuity from the previous Power Rangers comics (2016–2024).

== Publication history ==
=== Background ===
Since 2016 to 2024, Boom! Studios published a Power Rangers comic book continuity, which featured events like "Shattered Grid", "Necessary Evil", "Unlimited Power/The Eltarian War", and "Charge to 100!", concluding with the ''Recharged/Darkest Hour'' crossover storyline.

=== Development ===
In August 2024, it was announced that a new series dubbed Power Rangers Prime would debut in November later that year. The series, written by Melissa Flores and illustrated by Michael Yg, will serve as a reboot to Boom!'s comic continuity.

== Setting ==
Power Rangers Prime is set in an alternate universe forged in the aftermath of the ''Recharged/Darkest Hour" storyline.

In this timeline, Earth was invaded by the Beast Brigade, which defeated the Power Rangers until the Eltarian Army came. As a result, the Eltarians ruled the Earth through an authoritarian regime, viewing all Rangers as a menace and sending heroes like the VR Troopers to capture them. Moreover, Rita Repulsa is free from her slumber and begins her machinations to found a new team of Rangers.

In the meantime, the Troopers begin to question everything they believed about the regime, when a familiar face from their past appears.

== Characters ==
Characters in bold are original in the series.

=== Prime Rangers ===
Character	Ranger
Lauren Shiba	Red Prime Ranger
**Junmor**	Black Prime Ranger
**Markon "Mark" Zhao**	Blue Prime Ranger
**Valentina**	Yellow Prime Ranger
Orion	Pink Prime Ranger
Rita Repulsa	Green Prime Ranger

=== VR Troopers ===
Character	VR Trooper
Ryan Steele	VR Ryan
Kaitlin Star	VR Kaitlin
JB Reese	VR JB

=== Villains ===
- **Beast Brigade**
- **Volar**
- **Dark Heart**
- **Skugs**

=== Others ===
- **Doobie**, a dog owned by Orion and Mark.
- Farkas "Bulk" Bulkeimer
- Jayden Shiba, Lauren's brother

== List of publications ==
=== Main series ===
Title	Issues	Writer	Artist	Colorist	Debut date	Conclusion date
Power Rangers Prime	1–16	Melissa Flores	Simona Di Gianfelice; Federico Sorresa; Michael Yg	Joana Lafuente; Fabi Marques	November 13, 2024	April 8, 2026

=== Tie-in series ===
Title	Issues	Writer	Artist	Colorist	Debut date	Conclusion date
VR Troopers	1–6	Mairghread Scott	Sebastián Piriz	JP Jordan	June 25, 2025	January 21, 2025

=== One-shot ===
Title	Side story	Writer	Artist(s)	Colorist(s)	Publication date
Free Comic Book Day 2025: Power Rangers/VR Troopers	Power Rangers	Melissa Flores	Trish Forstner	Joana Lafuente	May 5, 2025
Free Comic Book Day 2025: Power Rangers/VR Troopers	VR Troopers	Mairghread Scott	Sebastián Piriz	JP Jordan	May 5, 2025

=== Other ===
Title	Issues	Debut date	Conclusion date
VR Troopers/Power Rangers Flipbook Facsimile Edition	1–4	August 27, 2025	January 21, 2026

== Collected editions ==
Title	Material collected	Publication date	ISBN
Power Rangers Prime Vol. 1	Power Rangers Prime #1–4	June 4, 2025	ISBN 9798892153607
Power Rangers Prime Vol. 2	Power Rangers Prime #5–8	November 11, 2025	ISBN 9798892155786
Power Rangers Prime Vol. 3	Power Rangers Prime #9–12	April 28, 2026	ISBN 9798892157315
VR Troopers	VR Troopers #1–6	May 26, 2026	ISBN 9798892158343
VR Troopers/Power Rangers Flipbook Facsimile Edition	VR Troopers/Power Rangers Flipbook Facsimile Edition #1–4	June 30, 2026	ISBN 9798892158442
Power Rangers Prime Vol. 4	Power Rangers Prime #13–16	July 21, 2026	ISBN 9798892158619

== Reception ==
The debut issue received positive reviews.

== See also ==
- Power Rangers (Boom! Studios)
- List of comics based on Hasbro properties
