= Taz in Escape from Mars =

1994 video game

- Developers: HeadGames (MD); Al Baker & Associates (GG); Tec Toy (MS)
- Publishers: Sega; Tec Toy (MS)
- Platforms: Genesis, Game Gear, Master System
- Release: Genesis/Mega Drive: NA: August 1994; EU: September 23, 1994; Game Gear: NA: October 1994; EU: 1994; Master System: BRA: 1997
- Genres: Action, adventure
- Mode: Single-player

Taz in Escape from Mars is a video game developed by HeadGames and Al Baker & Associates and released by Sega in 1994 for the Genesis/Mega Drive and Game Gear respectively featuring Taz, the Looney Tunes Tasmanian devil cartoon character. The Game Gear version was ported by TecToy to the Master System and released in 1997 only in Brazil. Taz must escape from Mars, where he was brought by Marvin the Martian. The game includes six worlds with two or three levels in each world.

== Plot ==
Looking in his book for Earth creatures and finding the Tasmanian Devil, Marvin the Martian gets the idea of capturing Taz for his zoo. He heads to Earth, beams Taz up into his flying saucer, and takes Taz to his Martian zoo. Meanwhile, Taz escapes. After making his way back to Earth, Taz returns to Mars and visits Marvin's house to find and defeat him in battle. After defeating Marvin, Taz steals a space ship and steers it back to Earth. The game ends when the devil eats a pile of fruit on the way back home and went away spinning all the way.

== Gameplay ==
Taz jumps, spins, flips switches and picks up items. By spinning and colliding with an enemy, Taz can defeat his enemies and dig into the ground. Taz starts with 12 hit points. If he touches an enemy when not spinning, he loses one hit point. Some enemies, like the fly or armored soldier (in the haunted castle world), cannot be defeated by the spin, but only by rocks or the flame. Others, like Yosemite Sam, cannot be defeated at all. The player completes a level by either defeating the boss of that level or reaching the exit sign.

Acquiring food replenishes Taz's hit points. By spinning into the food, the food is destroyed. A medipack which replenishes 6 hit points if eaten. By eating a box of rocks, Taz can spit out rocks at his enemies. By eating a gas container, Taz can breathe out fire. Each gives ten shots. Extra lives and continues are scattered around the levels. There are also various power-downs that take one hit point away. These include small black bombs, a time bomb, and a cake with dynamite. Other objects include shrink and grow potions. By contacting these items in a spin, they are destroyed. While enlarged, Taz can destroy any enemy by simply touching it and enemy attacks do not damage Taz. While shrunk, Taz cannot destroy anything but can get through narrow passageways.

== Reception ==
The four reviewers of Electronic Gaming Monthly were divided about the Genesis version of the game. Two of them contended it to be mediocre, citing dull and simplistic graphics and difficulty in figuring out what to do, while the other two recommended it, saying it is a major improvement over Sega's previous Taz game, and particularly praising Taz's new techniques. They gave the game a 7 out of 10 average.

GamePro commented that the Game Gear version's graphics, music, sound effects, and even controls are all vastly inferior to those of the Genesis version, but nonetheless concluded that fans of Taz would enjoy the game.
