= Sega Game Pack 4 in 1 =

- The title screen of this video game.
- Publisher: Sega
- Platform: Game Gear
- Release: EU: 1992
- Genre: Various
- Mode: Single-player

Sega Game Pack 4 in 1 is a collection of four video games released by Sega in 1992 for their Game Gear handheld console and was generally included with new consoles. The games include Flash Columns, Penalty Shootout, Tennis and Rally.

== Gameplay ==
=== Columns Flash ===
Based on the game mode in the original Columns game. The player has to rearrange falling columns of gems to connect four matching shapes in order to make them disappear. To clear the level, players must clear all the flashing gems in the level. The game is over when the gems reach the top of the screen.

=== Penalty Shootout ===
A soccer game based on taking penalties. When shooting the penalties, the player can select how to swerve the ball and how high to kick it at the goal. When playing as the goalkeeper against the computer, the player must save penalties by guessing where the shot will be placed. To clear the level, the player must score more penalties than the computer.

=== Championship Tennis ===
A basic tennis game, with players facing increasingly harder opponents. Sonic the Hedgehog makes a cameo appearance as the umpire.

=== Pan American Road Rally ===
An arcade-style racing game with five levels. The player must avoid other racers and reach checkpoints to stay in the race. The game ends when the timer runs out.
