= Eternal Legend =

1991 video game

- Developer: JAM
- Publisher: Sega
- Platform: Game Gear
- Release: JP: August 9, 1991
- Genre: Role-playing
- Mode: Single-player

Eternal Legend: Eien no Densetsu (Note: Japanese: エターナルレジェンド 永遠の伝説, Hepburn: lit. Eternal Legend) is a Japan-exclusive Game Gear role-playing video game. While the "Eternal Legend" name was used in both game packaging and advertising materials, the subtitle "Eien no Densetsu" (永遠の伝説) was only used to advertise the game for the Japanese market.

== Summary ==
In-game screenshot

The player controls a boy who must save the world from the evil monsters and villains that roam the land outside of the villages as well as explore numerous dungeons. According to the game’s story, the super-nation Millennium which had conquered the world before searches for the secret which had disappeared in one night. Up to three characters travel together in the player's party, the members of which are changed around depending on where in the story is being played.

The player will traverse through a total of fifteen dungeons composed of simpler caves and temples as well as more difficult pyramids and fortresses, along with a further fifteen villages over the course of the game. This video game was released in the era of traditional role-playing games like Dragon Quest. During the selection sequence for a combat scenario, there is a common "battle" command for all members of the party.

Once the player progresses beyond a certain point in the game acquire the use of a ship as a form of transportation, similar in method to the ship found in the original Final Fantasy video game for the original Nintendo Entertainment System.
