= Ryukyu (video game) =

1989 video game

- X68000 box art
- Developers: ASCII Corporation; Success (arcade); Face (consoles)
- Publishers: JP: Login Soft; JP: Sega (arcade); JP: Face (consoles); WW: Sega (GG)
- Designer: Ryuji Kuwaki
- Platforms: X68000, PC-98, MSX2, arcade, PC Engine, Game Gear
- Release: JP: August 8, 1989
- Genre: Puzzle
- Mode: Single-player

Ryukyu (Note: Japanese: 琉球, Hepburn: Ryūkyū) is a 1989 puzzle video game developed by ASCII Corporation and published by Login Soft for X68000, PC-98 and MSX2. It was ported to the arcades by Success and the PC Engine and Game Gear by Face; Sega released the game in the arcades and the Game Gear version outside Japan as Solitaire Poker.

Hamster Corporation released the arcade version outside Japan for the first time as part of their Arcade Archives series for the Nintendo Switch and PlayStation 4 in May 2025.

== Gameplay ==
Ryukyu is a combination of solitaire and poker. Players carefully select cards from their deck to drop into a 5x5 square, in order to create the best Poker hands possible in vertical, horizontal, and diagonal lines to clear stages and compete for high scores. All poker hands rise in score as defined in actual poker.

== Development ==
Ryukyu was designed by Ryuji Kuwaki, a college student at the time, as a submission to a software contest held by LOGiN, a regular extra issue of ASCII that eventually branched off to become Famitsu. The game was named after the Ryukyu Islands, present-day Okinawa Prefecture, where the game is set at. Kuwaki won the grand prize, in addition to the Yuji Horii and Yoshio Kiya Awards held by the magazine. ASCII helped Kuwaki finalize the game, which was released on August 8, 1989, for X68000, PC-98 and MSX2, while Kuwaki retained the copyright. Success successfully negotiated for the arcade rights with ASCII, developing an arcade port released by Sega which brought the game to a wider audience. Face developed ports to the PC Engine and Game Gear, the latter of which was released overseas by Sega.

== Reception ==
Famitsu gave the arcade version a 25/40 score.

Reception

Review score
Publication	Score
Famitsu	6/10, 6/10, 7/10, 6/10
