= VR Troopers (video game) =

1995 video game

- North American Genesis cover art
- Developer: Syrox Developments
- Publisher: Sega
- Producers: J. David Koch; Michael Latham
- Programmers: Rob Brooks; Dominic Wood
- Artists: Eric Bailey; Jim Studt; Jon Green
- Composer: Martin Walker
- Series: VR Troopers
- Platforms: Sega Genesis, Game Gear
- Release: Genesis: NA: 1995; EU: December 8, 1995; Game Gear: WW: 1995
- Genre: Fighting
- Modes: Single-player, multiplayer (Genesis version)

VR Troopers is a 1995 fighting game based on the American syndicated television series VR Troopers that itself used elements from several different Japanese tokusatsu shows from the Metal Hero Series. It was developed by Syrox Developments and published by Sega. The game was released on the Sega Genesis and the Sega Game Gear.

== Plot ==
Antagonist Grimlord sends an arcade game to Tao's Dojo which ends up sucking protagonists Ryan Steele, J.B. Reese, and Kaitlin Star into Virtual Reality. To escape, they embark on a mission to defeat Grimlord's Skugs and monsters.

== Gameplay ==
=== Genesis version ===
The player has three modes to choose from. Story Game, Vs. Battle, and CPU duel. Story Game is a mode where the player can choose from any one of the three VR Troopers to face off against the evil leader Grimlord's mutants and cyborgs and eventually Grimlord. Vs. Battle is a two-player mode where a player and a friend can face off against each other. CPU duel is a simple fight between the player and an opponent controlled by the computer. The player can choose their fighter, and what stage they want to fight on. If the player chooses a fighter and the opponent is the same fighter, the opponents character gets re-skinned a different color.

=== Game Gear version ===
The player has two modes to choose from. Story Game and Battle Game. Story Game is a mode where the player can choose from any one of the three VR Troopers to face off against the evil leader Grimlord's mutants and cyborgs. Battle Game is a ladder-type fighting game mode where the player can choose from eight different characters to beat a certain number of enemies and win the game. The player must face a ninth character original to the game called Kamelion who can shape-shift to any other character.

== Reception ==
Next Generation reviewed the Genesis version of the game, rating it one star out of five, and stated that "this game is exceptionally generic with some real simplistic fighting (good for kids, though) and nothing that makes it worth owning unless you're a huge fan of the show."

Mean Machines Sega #40 reviewed the game and gave it a rating of 45, in particular criticizing its lack of fresh ideas.
