= Arena: Maze of Death =

1996 video game

- European cover art
- Developer: Eden Entertainment Software
- Publisher: Sega
- Producer: Sean Kelly
- Designers: Mike Brown; Sean Kelly
- Programmers: Stuart Middleton; Tim Round; Julian Scott
- Artists: Jason Evans; Robert Dorney; Gordon Theobold
- Composer: Paul Lathem
- Platform: Game Gear
- Release: NA: 1996; EU: 1996
- Genre: Action
- Mode: Single-player

Arena/Maze of Death, known in Europe as Arena, is an isometric action created by Eden Entertainment Software for the Game Gear. Players have to play the role as a one-person mercenary squad who is trapped in heavily guarded and deadly areas with the primary goal of surviving. This game was released late in the Game Gear's life span. A Master System version was developed simultaneously, but Sega later decided to cancel it in favor of the Game Gear version.

== Plot ==
While navigating through a maze, the main character is confronted by two enemies wielding guns.

The setting is a futuristic city in the year 2026.

A television broadcasting company called Astralnet Broadcasting Company (ABC) was created to brainwash the population. A pro-democratic sympathizer, Guy Freelander, is charged with the task of navigating through a warehouse district, an industrial park, and an old abandoned train station in order to enter a high-rise building through a weakly defended "back door" and broadcast proof of an evil corporation's wrongdoings over the television stations.

== Reception ==
The four reviewers of Electronic Gaming Monthly commented on how advanced the game's graphics are, saying that it looks better than even many contemporary Sega Genesis games. Most of them also praised the complexity and fun of the gameplay, and said it was the best Game Gear release to come out in months. They gave it an average score of 8 out of 10.

In a retrospective review for Allgame, Jonathan Sutyak gave Arena: Maze of Death a rating of 4 out of 5 stars. He praised the open exploration of levels, password feature, easy controls, and advanced graphics, and concluded that the game "will appeal to action and adventure fans alike."
