= Tom and Jerry: The Movie =

1992 film by Phil Roman

- Theatrical release poster
- Directed by: Phil Roman
- Screenplay by: Dennis Marks
- Based on: Tom and Jerry by: William Hanna; Joseph Barbera
- Produced by: Phil Roman
- Starring: Richard Kind; Dana Hill; Anndi McAfee; Tony Jay; Henry Gibson; Michael Bell; Ed Gilbert; David L. Lander; Rip Taylor; Howard Morris; Charlotte Rae
- Edited by: Tim J. Borquez; Timothy Mertens
- Music by: Henry Mancini
- Production companies: Turner Entertainment Co.; Live Entertainment; Film Roman (Note: Animation outsourced to Wang Film Productions, The Baer Animation Company and Creative Capers Cartoons.)
- Distributed by: Miramax Films (United States); Turner Pictures Worldwide Distribution (International)
- Release dates: October 1, 1992 (Germany); July 30, 1993 (United States)
- Running time: 84 minutes
- Country: United States
- Language: English
- Budget: $15 million
- Box office: $3.6 million

Tom and Jerry: The Movie is a 1992 American animated musical comedy film based on the characters Tom and Jerry created by William Hanna and Joseph Barbera. It was produced and directed by Phil Roman, with a screenplay written by Dennis Marks, who also scripted some episodes of the then-airing TV series Tom & Jerry Kids. It features original songs written by Henry Mancini and Leslie Bricusse and a score also composed by Mancini. The film stars the voices of Richard Kind, Dana Hill, Anndi McAfee, Tony Jay, Rip Taylor, Henry Gibson, Michael Bell, Ed Gilbert, David L. Lander, Howard Morris, and Charlotte Rae.

It is the very first theatrical feature-length animated film featuring the titular characters, as well as the first piece of theatrically released Tom and Jerry media in 25 years. Although largely mute in the original cartoons, Tom and Jerry are given extensive spoken dialogue for the only time to date. Joseph Barbera, co-founder of Hanna-Barbera Productions and co-creator of the characters, served as the film's creative consultant. The movie tells the story about an eight-year-old girl named Robyn Starling, who enlists Tom and Jerry's help to escape from her evil legal guardian and reunite with her lost father.

Following its premiere in Germany on October 1, 1992, Tom and Jerry: The Movie was released theatrically in the United States on July 30, 1993, by Miramax Films, which was a subsidiary of The Walt Disney Company at the time. The film grossed $3.6 million and received negative reviews.

== Plot ==
A cat named Tom and his owners move to a new house, but he is distracted by his pursuit of a mouse named Jerry and is left behind by the moving van. Tom chases the van, but is attacked by a bulldog and forced to hide in the empty house.

The next morning, the house is demolished by a wrecking ball, leaving Tom and Jerry homeless and wandering the streets until they meet a stray dog named Puggsy and his flea companion, Frankie. Upon introducing themselves, Tom and Jerry, discovering they can both speak, are persuaded to befriend each other to survive, but when Jerry accepts to be Tom's friend, Tom disagrees, leaving Jerry to do the same. While Tom and Jerry search for food, Puggsy and Frankie are captured by dogcatchers, and when Tom is confronted by a hostile group of singing alley cats, Jerry traps them in a sewer.

Tom and Jerry soon meet Robyn Starling, a young runaway girl whose widowed father was supposedly killed in an avalanche during an expedition in Tibet. Robyn and her family's fortune were put in the custody of her wicked guardian "Aunt" Pristine Figg and her lawyer Lickboot, who see Robyn only as a means to keep their obtained wealth, but will lose it if Robyn's father has survived. A police officer finds and brings Robyn, Tom, and Jerry back to her home.

Figg reluctantly allows Tom and Jerry to stay, but the pair's food fight with Figg's obese skateboard-riding dachshund Ferdinand and their discovery of a telegram confirming the survival of Robyn's father convinces Figg to send them to sadistic animal trafficker Dr. Applecheek. His public persona as a kind animal lover allows Figg to falsely assure Robyn, and she locks her in the attic to prevent her from learning of her father's survival.

Tom and Jerry reunite with Puggsy and Frankie, who suggest using a nearby control panel to release the cages, freeing all the captured animals. Tom and Jerry return to Robyn and inform her of her father's survival. The three set out on a raft to find Robyn's father, but the raft is struck and split by a ship and separates the group. Meanwhile, in Tibet, Robyn's father is alerted of his daughter's situation and flies back to America to find her.

The next day, Figg and Lickboot place a bogus $1 million bounty on Robyn that they have no intent on paying. Robyn is found and hosted by amusement park manager Captain Kiddie and his parrot puppet Squawk. Kiddie and Squawk are initially accommodating to Robyn until they see Figg's bounty on a milk carton, whereupon they detain Robyn on a Ferris wheel and contact Figg. Applecheek and his dogcatchers also learn of the bounty and attempt to collect it before Figg's arrival. Tom and Jerry manage to find and rescue Robyn, trap the dogcatchers and escape in a paddle steamer with Figg, Lickboot, Ferdinand, Kiddie and Squawk, and Applecheek in hot pursuit. Applecheek falls from a bridge and sinks Kiddie and Squawk's dinghy, while Figg, Lickboot and Ferdinand head to "Robyn's Nest" – a small cabin where Robyn and her father spent their summers – predicting that she will hide there.

At the cabin, Robyn is ambushed by Figg, Lickboot and Ferdinand; Lickboot locks Tom and Jerry outside. Robyn is offended that Figg has lied to her and refuses to return to her, but an oil lamp is knocked over and starts a fire. While Figg, Lickboot, and Ferdinand attempt to escape, Tom and Jerry save Robyn and take refuge on the roof. Figg and Lickboot manage to vacate the cabin, but stumble on Ferdinand's skateboard and crash onto the paddle steamer, which sails out of control down the river. (Note: The novelization states that Figg and Lickboot are rescued from the runaway paddle steamer and arrested for their crimes.) Robyn's father arrives by helicopter to rescue her while Tom and Jerry barely manage to survive the cabin's collapse.

Sometime later, Robyn's father lets Tom and Jerry begin a new life in Robyn's luxurious villa and return to their old habits as rivals.

== Voice cast ==
- Richard Kind as Tom, a bicolor cat
- Dana Hill as Jerry, a house mouse
- Anndi McAfee as Robyn Starling
- Charlotte Rae as Aunt Pristine Figg
- Tony Jay as Lickboot
- Michael Bell as:
  - Ferdinand
  - Straycatcher #1
- Henry Gibson as Dr. Applecheek
- Ed Gilbert as:
  - Puggsy
  - Mr. Starling
- David Lander as Frankie da Flea
- Rip Taylor as Captain Kiddie
- Howard Morris as Squawk
- Sydney Lassick as Straycatcher #2
- Don Messick as Droopy
- Tino Insana as a police officer
- B. J. Ward as Tom's Owner
- Greg Burson as Moving Man
- Raymond McLeod as:
  - Bulldog
  - Alleycat #1
- Mitchell D. Moore as Alleycat #2
- Scott Wojahn as Alleycat #3

== Production ==
=== Development ===
There were numerous attempts to make a Tom and Jerry feature film, primarily in the 1970s after the successful reruns of the original cartoons and the airings of the new TV animated versions (although there have been debatable possibilities of making attempts in the golden age of cartoons). Chuck Jones, who previously worked on his take on the characters in his studio MGM Animation/Visual Arts, wanted to make a Tom and Jerry film but later dropped the idea due to not finding a suitable script to work with.

In December 1978, Metro-Goldwyn-Mayer announced plans to adapt Tom and Jerry into a live-action feature film. By June 1980, writer David Newman and producer Martin Erlichman were reportedly attached to the project with Dustin Hoffman and Chevy Chase reportedly in consideration to voice the characters possibly suggesting that the film would be animated. By June 1987, it was reported that the film was still in active development with MGM anticipating a $6 to 7 million production.

The later idea to make a Tom and Jerry film came about from Joseph Barbera who remained an executive consultant on the film. Due to the large amount of his career he had spent on Tom and Jerry shorts and the impact they had left he felt it was a shame to see such a great property lying unused. Barbera eventually learned that Turner Entertainment Co. had acquired the rights to Tom and Jerry after briefly acquiring the MGM/UA Entertainment Company and then selling the physical production assets, lot, and the United Artists portion back to previous owner Kirk Kerkorian while retaining the film negatives of their film catalogue. Barbera met with then Turner Vice President Roger Mayer with Barbera telling off his involvement in the creation of Tom and Jerry and suggesting the possibility of doing either a television special or Feature film with the characters, with Barbera hoping for the latter. After the meeting concluded with Mayer seemingly uninterested in a Tom and Jerry project, Barbera received a call from Mayer saying Turner was interested and forwarded a $75,000 advance to develop a script, artwork, and partial storyboard for the project. Sometime between August 1987 and 1988, Barbera then presented the pitch to Ted Turner who liked the pitch and agreed to finance half the project with Hanna-Barbera Productions. Barbera managed to set up a meeting with friend and then 20th Century Fox head Joe Roth and President of Productions Roger Birnbaum and presented the same pitch that had impressed Ted Turner with the two impressed and the remaining half of support for the film sealed. However, momentum of the film was curtailed when Hanna-Barbera's parent company Taft Broadcasting experienced financial difficulties from a decrease in television revenues prompting the sale of Hanna-Barbera to Great American Broadcasting. Due to concerns of Great American about the advanced ages of Barbera and William Hanna, David Kirschner was hired to work with the two in running the studio and one of Kirschner's first actions was telling Barbera he didn't want to do a Tom and Jerry movie despite the pitch having already been sold and backing obtained. Barbera tried to find a way to keep the project going, but Kirschner had already met with Barry Diller at Fox and convinced them to drop Tom and Jerry in favor of one of his own projects, that being Once Upon a Forest, though Barbera bore Kirschner no ill will do to it being the nature of the business.

By February 1990, it was reported that the film had been put on hold due to story issues stemming from the muteness of the titular characters causing story problems. Turner ended up putting the project Turnaround while Hanna-Barbera went through a re-evaluation and alternative partnership was struct with Germany based company Media Special International and animation company Film Roman. Turner Entertainment Co. would eventually acquire Hanna-Barbera and all its assorted properties in December 1991, and increased the budget for the Tom and Jerry movie to $15 million. According to Barbera, Turner was still supportive of the project even after Fox dropped out and on Barbera's recommendation Phil Roman of Film Roman as Barbera had worked with him before. Barbera met with Michael Jackson as Jackson was an avid cartoon fan and wanted to discuss a potential project they could work on with Barbera hopeful that Jackson could contribute to the soundtrack for the film. However, Great American Communications sent a memo saying they had no interest in working with Michael Jackson and nothing further came of the idea.

In the early development of the script by Dennis Marks, some of its dialogue and actions in other scenes, including the main characters talking throughout at the beginning before encountering Puggsy and Frankie, had to be taken out. Originally, a comedic sequence before the further events of the duo talking was drafted as a prologue and homage to the original cartoons before the credits, but it was later decided to drop the idea and it was partially replaced by the animated slapstick scenes during the credits for the sake of moving forward with the story.

Michael Peraza was hired by production manager Mike Wolf in November 1990 to serve as art director for the film. Peraza was given the script by Dennis Marks and did not like what was presented as the titular Tom and Jerry were not present all that much in the script and the primary focus was on the characters of stray dog Pugsy and Frankie da Flea. Peraza felt the script, which had been around for a long time, read more like a Saturday-morning cartoon and the script was restructured to address some of the issues. Peraza felt the end result was an improvement from the incarnation of the script but still expressed dissatisfaction with certain character motivations lacking clarity. Peraza also was disappointed with the humor in the film as the team had wanted the film to go to the level of Ren and Stimpy or Itchy & Scratchy but were only able to push the humor so far with Peraza discussing the end result as the team having "pushed the Tom & Jerry envelope as far as we could". The characters of Pugsy and Frankie were deemed necessary due to the fact that Tom and Jerry don't talk and that a film with two stars who don't speak would not play with audiences. There were discussions about having the characters act in pantomime or usage of inner monologues similar to Garfield before ultimately deciding to have the characters speak as having mute leads would have felt too much like a handicap. Many of the characters were given cars as the producers requested a car chase sequence in the vein of Wacky Races complete with vehicles matching the characters' personalities. The original script featured a fat Southern sheriff similar to Buford T. Justice from Smokey and the Bandit, but due to Peraza feeling the trope was stale he convinced producers Phil Roman and Joseph Barbera to allow him to change the character into a performing ship captain with a split personality that manifest through his parrot hand puppet.

=== Animation ===
Animators on Tom and Jerry: The Movie include Eric Thomas, Art Roman, Doug Frankel, Tony Fucile, Steven E. Gordon, Leslie Gorin, Dan Haskett, Brian Robert Hogan, Gabi Payn, Irven Spence and Arnie Wong. Some animation was outsourced to Wang Film Productions in Taiwan, where James Miko and Aundre Knutson served as supervising directors. Additional animation was provided by The Baer Animation Company and Creative Capers Cartoons. The computer animation for the vehicles was provided by Kroyer Films.

== Music ==
Tom and Jerry: The Movie – Original Motion Picture Soundtrack

Soundtrack album by Various Artists
- Released: July 20, 1993; December 11, 2005 (reissued)
- Recorded: 1991
- Genres: Pop; Film soundtrack
- Labels: MCA MCAC/MCAD-10721; EMI (France); Music Marketing ApS (Denmark)
- Producers: Henry Mancini; Leslie Bricusse

During production, after witnessing the successful start of the Disney Renaissance, the crew decided to make the film a musical and hired Oscar-winning composers Henry Mancini and Leslie Bricusse to write the musical numbers after their work in another film, Victor/Victoria, with a touch of melodic structure reminiscent to the classic golden age of movie musicals, especially the ones from MGM like The Wizard of Oz and Singin' in the Rain, and with help from music students at Roger Williams University. Original songs performed in the film include "Friends to the End", "What Do We Care? (The Alley Cats' Song)", "(Money is Such) A Beautiful Word", "God's Little Creatures", "I Miss You (Robyn's Song)", "I've Done It All", and "All in How Much We Give".

A soundtrack album was released by MCA Records in 1993 and included both the songs and score from the film, composed by Henry Mancini. The end credits has a pop version of "I Miss You" (the song Robyn sings), this time sung by Stephanie Mills, which does not appear on the film's soundtrack release, followed by "All in How Much We Give" also sung by Stephanie Mills.

=== Songs ===
Original songs performed in the film include:

No.	Title	Performer(s)	Length
1.	"Friends to the End"	Richard Kind, Dana Hill, Ed Gilbert & David Lander	3:23
2.	"What Do We Care? (The Alley Cats' Song)"	Raymond McLeod, Michael D. Moore & Scott Wojahn	2:55
3.	"(Money is Such) A Beautiful Word"	Charlotte Rae & Tony Jay	2:20
4.	"God's Little Creatures"	Henry Gibson	2:48
5.	"I Miss You (Robyn's Song)"	Anndi McAfee	2:18
6.	"I've Done It All"	Rip Taylor & Howard Morris	2:13
7.	"I Miss You (End Title)"	Stephanie Mills
8.	"All in How Much We Give"	Stephanie Mills

== Reception ==
=== Critical response ===
On the review aggregator website Rotten Tomatoes, 14% of 14 critics' reviews are positive, with an average rating of 3.4/10. Audiences polled by CinemaScore gave the film an average grade of "A-" on an A+ to F scale.

Joseph McBride of Variety gave the film a negative review, saying that "Tom and Jerry Talk won't go down in film history as a slogan to rival Garbo Talks." Charles Solomon of the Los Angeles Times panned the film's songs and Phil Roman's direction. Hal Hinson of The Washington Post criticized the dialogue between the cat and mouse and said that the voices "don't fit the characters". Hinson also complained that the musical numbers are "as forgettable as they are intolerably bouncy and upbeat".

Gene Siskel and Roger Ebert gave the film two thumbs down on Siskel & Ebert. Although they praised the animation style for its faithfulness to the theatrical shorts, neither thought that it was a good idea to give dialogue to the two characters with Ebert stating that by making the duo talk "the movie loses the pure comedy of the cartoon shorts where everything depended on situation and action." Additionally, they felt that the film suffered from a lack of slapstick action compared to the shorts, and criticized the story for giving the character of Robyn Starling more screen time than the titular characters. Vincent Canby of The New York Times was more positive in his review; he praised Mancini's score and the musical numbers, and felt that "[the characters of] Tom and Jerry have charm."

=== Box office ===
Tom and Jerry: The Movie released theatrically on July 30, 1993 in the United States and Canada alongside Rising Sun, Robin Hood: Men in Tights and So I Married an Axe Murderer. Ranking number fourteen at the North American box office, the film grossed $3,560,469 worldwide.

According to Joseph Barbera, the film was a massive hit in Germany and played in theaters for months after release.

== Video games ==
A video game based on the movie was released for the Master System on October 1, 1992 and Game Gear on July 14, 1993, followed by a handheld version by Tiger Electronics. A second game Tom and Jerry: Frantic Antics was released for Game Boy on October 2, 1993 and Sega Genesis on December 21, 1993 by Hi-Tech Expressions and Altron.

== Home media ==
The film was released on VHS and LaserDisc on October 26, 1993 by Family Home Entertainment. Warner Bros. acquired the rights to the film from Live Entertainment after acquiring Turner Broadcasting System in 1996. Their home video unit Warner Home Video re-released it on VHS under their Warner Bros. Family Entertainment label on March 2, 1999. The film was also released on DVD on March 26, 2002 in United States by Warner Home Video. Despite receiving a VHS release from First Independent Films, the film is yet to have an official region 2 DVD release in the United Kingdom. The film became available on HBO Max in a digitally-remastered widescreen format on July 1, 2020, but was removed in the United States following the streaming service's Max rebrand.

== Cancelled sequel ==
In November 1992, it was reported that due to the success the film had achieved in Germany, Austria, and Switzerland, Metro-Goldwyn-Mayer had entered into negotiations about a sequel. However, no such film ever came to fruition.
