= Pet Club: Inu Daisuki! =

1996 video game

- Box art
- Publisher(s): Sega
- Platform(s): Game Gear
- Release: JP: December 6, 1996
- Genre(s): Strategy
- Mode(s): Single-player

Pet Club: Inu Daisuki! (ペット倶楽部 いぬ大好き！, "Pet Club: Loves Dogs!") is a video game where a player controls a young female person who has to take care of a pet dog.

== Summary ==
Attempting to play with the puppy.

The object of the game is to nurture the dog from puppyhood into adulthood and even into old age. There are many breeds of pets and there are several different kinds of young female avatars to control. First, the player must give the master a name; this is followed by giving the dog a name. Names be inserted using either hiragana, katakana or using the ASCII letters traditionally given to most European languages; this applies to both naming the dog and the owner.

Dogs must be taken for walks and given plenty of physical exercises, training in addition to lessons that teach them discipline. If neglected, the dog will hold his head up in the air and refuse to take orders from the player. Competition from the computer player's dog provides a reason for the player to give her dog adequate training and discipline without making the pet overly tired or hungry.

Pet Club: Inu Daisuki! is a part of the Japan-exclusive Kid's Gear line of video games for the Game Gear.
