= SIMS (company) =

Japanese video game publisher and developer

SIMS Co., Ltd.
- Native name: シムス株式会社
- Romanized name: Kabushiki-gaisha Shimusu
- Type: Subsidiary
- Industry: Video games
- Founded: June 12, 1991
- Headquarters: Shibuya, Tokyo, Japan
- Key people: Noboru Machida (CEO); Hideki Katagiri (director); Keisuke Nozawa (director)
- Products: List of Sanritsu/SIMS games
- Number of employees: 32
- Parent: Sega (1991–2004)
- Website: http://www.sims.co.jp/

SIMS Co., Ltd. (Note: Japanese: シムス株式会社, Hepburn: Kabushiki gaisha Shimusu) (Note: An abbreviation of Soft Development Innovation Multi Success) is a Japanese video game publisher and developer headquartered in Shibuya, Tokyo. It was founded in June 12, 1991, as a joint venture between Sanritsu Denki and Sega Enterprises.

== History ==
SIMS was originally established on June 12, 1991 as a joint venture of Sanritsu Denki Co., Ltd. and Sega Enterprises, Ltd. About 50 employees transferred over from Sanritsu.

SIMS became independent from Sega on June 25, 2004, when representative director Noboru Machida took over all stock.

== Games ==
=== Nintendo 3DS ===
- Fish On
- Beyblade: Evolution

=== PlayStation Vita ===
- Let's Fish! Hooked On

=== Dreamcast ===
- Charge 'N Blast
- Harusame Youbi
- The House of the Dead 2
- Maboroshi Tsukiyo
- Sega Bass Fishing

=== Master System ===
- Air Rescue
- Aladdin
- Alien Storm
- Buggy Run
- George Foreman's KO Boxing
- Master of Darkness
- Masters of Combat
- Ninja Gaiden
- Putt & Putter

=== Mega Drive / Genesis ===
- ATP Tour Championship Tennis
- Devil Buster (unreleased)
- From TV Animation Slam Dunk: Kyougou Makkou Taiketsu!
- Mighty Morphin Power Rangers: The Movie
- Out Run 2019
- Shadow Dancer
- Scratch Golf (unreleased)
- Wimbledon II (unreleased)

=== Sega CD ===
- Vay

=== Game Gear ===
- Mighty Morphin Power Rangers
- Disney's Aladdin
- Buster Fight
- Fred Couples Golf
- Master of Darkness
- Tails' Skypatrol
- Alien Syndrome

=== Wii ===
- Hooked! Real Motion Fishing
- Sega Bass Fishing (co-developed with Cavia)
- Reel Fishing: Angler's Dream
- Hooked! Again: Real Motion Fishing
- All Round Hunter

=== WiiWare ===
- Derby Dogs
- Reel Fishing Challenge

=== PSP ===
- Ape Escape: On the Loose

=== Multi-platform ===
- Mark Davis Pro Bass Challenge (PS2, GameCube)
- Legendary Fishing (PS4, Switch)

== See also ==
- List of Sanritsu/SIMS games
