= Final Symphony II =

Concert tour of music from the Final Fantasy video game series

- Orchestral concert tour by Merregnon Studios
- Conductor: Eckehard Stier
- Composer: Nobuo Uematsu, Masashi Hamauzu, Jonne Valtonen
- Arrangers: Masashi Hamauzu, Jonne Valtonen, Roger Wanamo
- Location: Germany, England, Japan, Finland, Sweden, Netherlands
- Start date: 29 August 2015
- Producer: Thomas Böcker (Merregnon Studios)

Merregnon Studios concert chronology
- Final Symphony (2013–); Final Symphony II (2015–); Symphonic Selections (2017–)

Final Symphony II is a symphonic concert tour first held at the Beethovenhalle in Bonn, Germany on 29 August 2015. The concert performances feature arrangements of video game music selected from the Final Fantasy series, specifically Final Fantasy V, VIII, IX, and XIII. It is divided into four acts, one per game, with the newest game, Final Fantasy XIII, first, and the oldest, V, last; all four arrangements are single-section arrangements, with the IX portion as a piano concerto. The tour is a follow-up to Final Symphony, a similar tour of orchestral arrangement performances from Final Fantasy VI, VII, and X beginning in 2013. The concert is produced and directed by Thomas Böcker of Merregnon Studios, with arrangements provided by Finnish composer and musician Jonne Valtonen, along with Roger Wanamo and Final Fantasy XIII composer Masashi Hamauzu. The original works were composed by Nobuo Uematsu and Hamauzu, and an introductory piece was composed by Valtonen. The premiere concert was performed by the Beethoven Orchestra Bonn under conduction from Eckehard Stier, with guest performer Mischa Cheung joining the orchestra on piano.

Following the initial performance, Final Symphony II was performed in several other venues. It was first performed in London (United Kingdom) at the Barbican Centre by the London Symphony Orchestra on 12 September 2015. The London Symphony Orchestra then travelled to Japan to perform the concert in Osaka on 27 September and twice in Yokohama on 4 October, the first time that a non-Japanese orchestra played a video game music concert in Japan. The 2016 performances of the concert were a concert on 1 April at the Tampere Hall in Tampere, Finland by the Tampere Philharmonic Orchestra, and a 9 June concert by the Royal Stockholm Philharmonic Orchestra at the Stockholm Concert Hall in Stockholm, Sweden. The Tampere concert featured an extra encore piano performance in addition to the two encores performed at all concerts. The 2019 performances were by the Netherlands Philharmonic Orchestra and by the Essen Philharmonic Orchestra on 5 and 6 July at the Concertgebouw in Amsterdam, Netherlands and the Philharmonic Hall Essen in Essen, Germany. For 2024, concerts are planned featuring the City of Birmingham Symphony Orchestra at the Symphony Hall in Birmingham, United Kingdom and the Royal Northern Sinfonia at The Glasshouse International Centre for Music in Newcastle, United Kingdom.

A video of the Stockholm performance of the Final Fantasy VIII section was released on 23 September 2016. A studio album recorded in summer 2023 and performed by the Royal Stockholm Philharmonic Orchestra was released on 4 August 2023. One piece, "Final Fantasy VIII – Mono no aware", was included in the Symphonic Memories Concert series in 2018 and 2019, and include in the associated Symphonic Memories Concert - music from Square Enix album. The concerts have been heavily praised, both for the quality of the performance and for the quality of the arrangements. Critics have claimed the concerts to be one of the highest quality video game music orchestral performances produced, along with the original Final Symphony, with the second tour considered to have simpler arrangement styles than the first but in turn be more approachable to audiences.

== Concert ==
=== Production ===
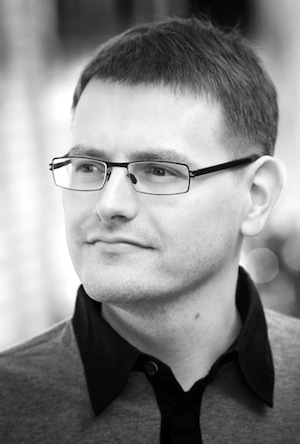
Producer Thomas Böcker in 2010

Thomas Böcker first began producing orchestral concerts of video game music in 2003 with the first Symphonic Game Music Concert in Leipzig, Germany. In 2008, he, through his production company Merregnon Studios, began a series of four concerts of video game music that used longer, more elaborate arrangements of themes from the individual pieces of music from the games. This Symphonic series of concerts stood in contrast to the more standard concerts, which played straightforward orchestral versions of individual songs. The four concerts were Symphonic Shades – Hülsbeck in Concert (2008), Symphonic Fantasies: Music from Square Enix (2009), Symphonic Legends – Music from Nintendo (2010), and Symphonic Odysseys: Tribute to Nobuo Uematsu (2011). Both Symphonic Fantasies and Symphonic Odysseys featured music from the Final Fantasy series composed by Nobuo Uematsu. Böcker has said that he considers Uematsu to be "the most famous composer of video game music and in general one of the most influential", and that Uematsu's 20020220 - Music from Final Fantasy concert in 2002 was a big influence on his own concerts.

By May 2012, Böcker was working on a concert of music solely from the Final Fantasy series, titled Final Symphony. The idea for the concert was first proposed by Uematsu in 2009 after Symphonic Fantasies; the concert had featured Final Fantasy music as one of its four components, but unlike the other three the music had been a straightforward medley rather than a more complicated arrangement. Uematsu had asked the team to keep the arrangements similar to those in other Final Fantasy concerts, but after the concert he felt that an opportunity had been missed to create something unique like the other three arrangements, especially the Secret of Mana section. He encouraged Böcker to take more liberties with the source material if the opportunity arose, and hoped that another concert could be created in the future. Böcker proposed Final Symphony later that year to Uematsu, and got approval from Square Enix while coordinating a Tokyo concert of Symphonic Fantasies. Final Symphony was the first concert consisting entirely of new Final Fantasy arrangements in over ten years, since 20020220 - Music from Final Fantasy.

Böcker and the arrangers intended the arrangements in the concert to be "about telling the stories of the games". In order to "capture the atmosphere of the games", they limited the concert to three games from the series, so as not to spread the concert too thin. They chose Final Fantasy VI, VII, and X as the games. Jonne Valtonen, Roger Wanamo, and Masashi Hamauzu created the arrangements for the concert. Valtonen and Wanamo had previously worked with Böcker on the concerts in the Symphonic series, and Böcker has stated that if they had been unavailable for the project he would not have created Final Symphony at all. Hamauzu, in addition to arranging the Final Fantasy X music, was one of the composers of the original pieces he arranged. Uematsu, who composed music for all three games, served as a consultant for the project, though he did not arrange any pieces.

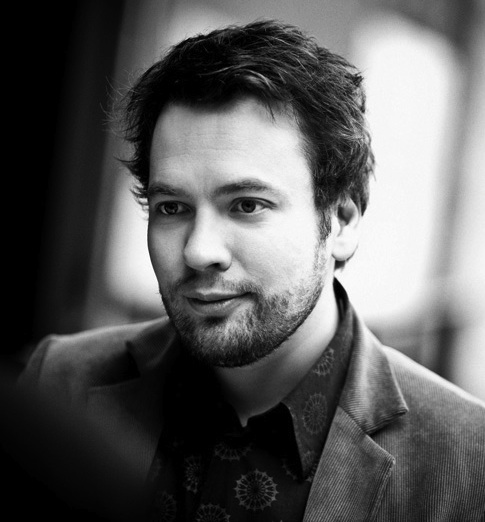
Arranger Jonne Valtonen in 2010

The first performance of Final Symphony was in Wuppertal, Germany at the Historische Stadthalle Wuppertal on 11 May 2013. The concert was held twice that day, performed by the Wuppertal Symphony Orchestra, and was conducted by Eckehard Stier, who had previously conducted for Symphonic Fantasies in Tokyo. The concert was very well received, and went on to be performed in five other cities around the world in 2013 and 2014. An album for the concert, recorded from a studio session by the London Symphony Orchestra, was released in 2015. A new concert, Final Symphony II, was performed in September 2015.

Final Symphony II features long arrangements like the Final Symphony concerts, from different games: while the first concert was based on Final Fantasy VI, VII, and X, the second uses pieces from Final Fantasy V, VIII, IX, and XIII. Like the first concert, all of the arrangements are new, and not based on any previous work. The majority of the music was originally composed by Nobuo Uematsu, while the Final Fantasy XIII suite was originally composed by Masashi Hamauzu. The arrangers from the first concert reprised their roles for the second: Valtonen created the arrangements for the Final Fantasy V section, Wanamo worked on the VIII and IX portions, and Hamauzu, with assistance from Valtonen, arranged Hamauzu's own compositions from XIII with orchestration by Valtonen. Like they did for the previous concert, when Merregnon Studios first began the project, Böcker, Valtonen, and Wanamo took a few months to play through the games, watch playthrough videos, and read reviews and analyses of the games, in order to understand the structure and progression of the main themes of the music in each game. An introductory fanfare, "In a Roundabout Way", was composed by Valtonen for the concert. Unlike Final Symphony, which featured three styles of orchestral performances—a piano concerto, a symphonic poem, and a three-movement symphony—all four arrangements are single-section arrangements, with the IX portion as a piano concerto.

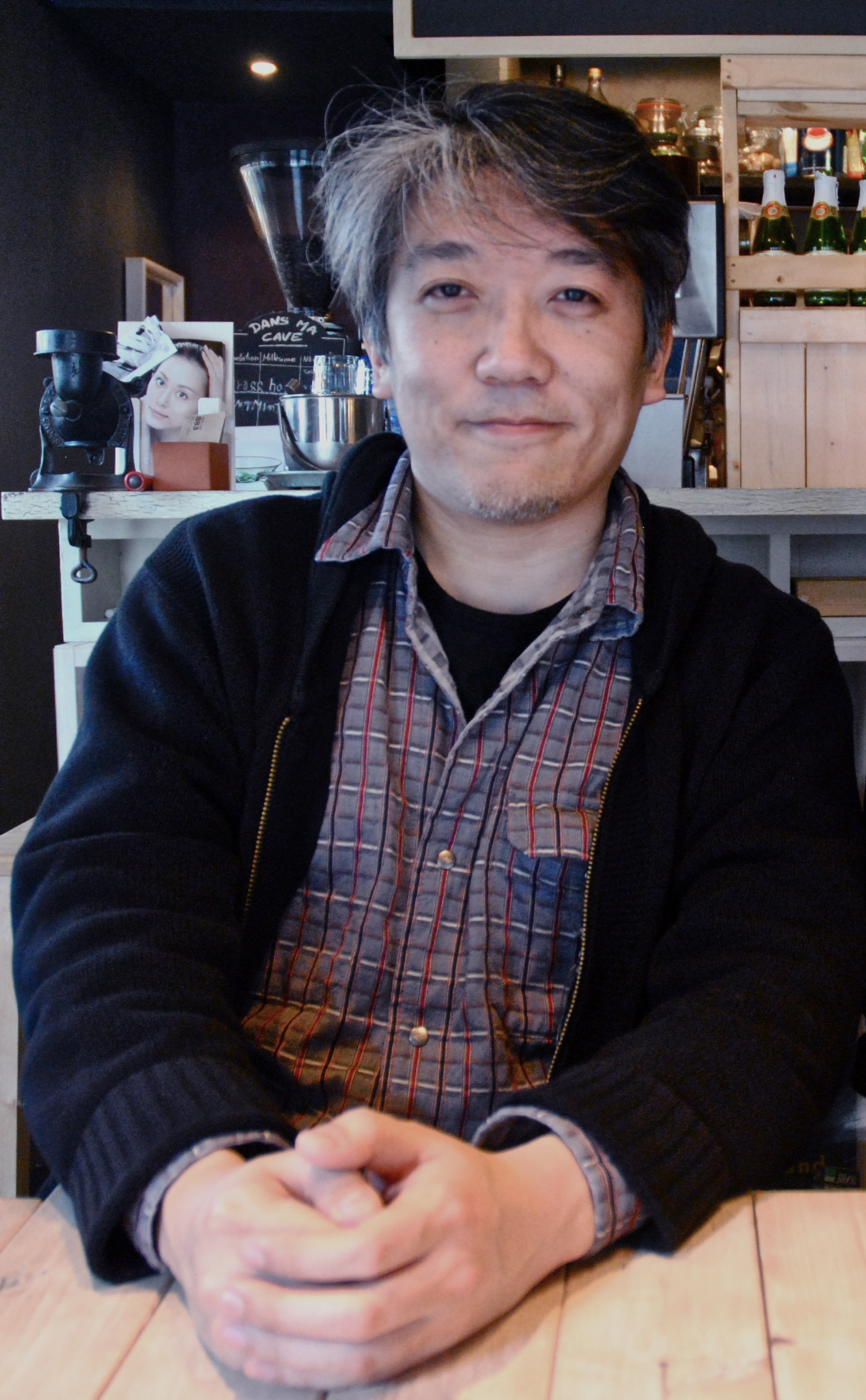
Composer and arranger Masashi Hamauzu in 2012

The concert is arranged in reverse chronological order, with the newest game, Final Fantasy XIII, first, and the oldest, Final Fantasy V, last. Hamauzu, feeling that "there were no orchestral versions of Final Fantasy XIII tracks that [he] was really satisfied with", wanted to create a "ground-breaking" arrangement of the main themes of the game. He decided to create a dramatic arc with the songs, starting with "Prelude to Final Fantasy XIII", "Vanille's Theme", and "Nautilus" as setting the story's stage with pieces centered on the character of Vanille, followed by the battle themes of "Fang's Theme", "Blinded by Light", and "Serah's Theme" to shift into a dramatic conclusion. The arrangements of "Blinded by Light" and "Serah's Theme" are both based on previous, unfinished arrangements by Hamauzu. Valtonen claims that the bulk of the arrangement, named "Utopia in the Sky", was done by Hamauzu: "Hamauzu's jazzy and impressionistic style already gave the music its gentle softness to which I added my own small imprint." The Final Fantasy IX section, "For the People of Gaia" is in the form of a piano concerto, with an orchestral introduction. The concerto, like the other sections of the concert, is a single movement, though it contains elements of a traditional four movement concerto. The concerto is based on the characters' motifs from the game, beginning with music related to Vivi's theme, which inspired the idea for Wanamo. It continues through music related to Zidane, then Garnet, before ending with the battle against Kuja, interspersed with themes from the protagonist characters. Wanamo was concerned about doing another piano concerto, as Merregnon had done one based on the Final Fantasy series for Symphonic Odysseys and Final Symphony, but felt that the soundtrack of Final Fantasy IX was diverse enough to support another.

The third section, from Final Fantasy VIII, was also arranged by Wanamo, and is named "Mono no aware" after the Japanese term for the "awareness of impermanence". The name is intended to capture a theme from the game of the conflict between childhood and adulthood, as well as the destruction of the present in favor of an uncertain future. The arrangement roughly follows the games storyline, fading away in the end like the game with uncertainty as to the conclusion of the characters' themes; Wanamo has said that the arrangement was difficult to create due to the similar emotional themes in many of the songs. Wanamo tried to "explore pieces that shared fragments and worked well together", interleaving pieces and motifs throughout the arrangement. The final arrangement of the concert, that of Final Fantasy V, is named "Library of Ancients". Valtonen based the arrangement on "Musica Machina", played in the game in the ancient base underneath the library used by the heroes. As in the game the wind has disappeared, the arrangement thereafter uses the song as a base to represent the source of the wind flowing from there through to other locations and battles from the game. The concerts feature two encore pieces; "Clash on the Big Bridge" from Final Fantasy V, which is interrupted and interspersed with the series' "Chocobo Theme" in humorous counterpoint, and "Main Theme of Final Fantasy", originally from the first Final Fantasy game. The Tampere, Finland performance featured a third encore piece in the middle of the performance, a piano arrangement of "You’re Not Alone" by Wanamo.

=== Performances ===
Performances
Date	City	Country	Venue	Orchestra	Concerts
29 August 2015	Bonn	Germany	Beethovenhalle Bonn	Beethoven Orchestra Bonn	1
12 September 2015	London	England	Barbican Centre	London Symphony Orchestra	1
27 September 2015	Osaka	Japan	Festival Hall Osaka	London Symphony Orchestra	1
4 October 2015	Yokohama	Japan	Yokohama Minato Mirai Hall	London Symphony Orchestra	2
1 April 2016	Tampere	Finland	Tampere Hall	Tampere Philharmonic Orchestra	1
9 June 2016	Stockholm	Sweden	Konserthuset	Royal Stockholm Philharmonic Orchestra	1
5 July 2019	Amsterdam	Netherlands	Concertgebouw Amsterdam	Netherlands Philharmonic Orchestra	1
6 July 2019	Essen	Germany	Philharmonic Hall Essen	Essen Philharmonic Orchestra	1
2 June 2024	Birmingham	United Kingdom	Symphony Hall Birmingham	City of Birmingham Symphony Orchestra	1
9 June 2024	Newcastle	United Kingdom	The Glasshouse	Royal Northern Sinfonia	1
6 July 2025	Wrocław	Poland	National Forum of Music	NFM Wrocław Philharmonic	1

Excerpt from Stockholm performance of "Mono no aware"

The first concert was a 12 September 2015 performance by the London Symphony Orchestra at the Barbican Centre in London, England, with the piano concerto performed by Slava Sidorenko, although an earlier premier performance was held on 29 August at the Beethovenhalle in Bonn, Germany by the Beethoven Orchestra Bonn. The concert featured a performance by pianist Mischa Cheung, who had previously been featured in a Final Symphony concert in Tampere, Finland. After the debut performances, the London Symphony Orchestra traveled to Japan to perform the concert there three times: in Osaka on 27 September, and twice in Yokohama on 4 October. The performances were the first time that a non-Japanese orchestra played a video game music concert in Japan. The London performance sold out, while the Japanese mini-tour played to packed halls with around 7,000 attendees. 2016 performances of the concert included a concert on 1 April at the Tampere Hall in Tampere by the Tampere Philharmonic Orchestra, and a 9 June concert by the Royal Stockholm Philharmonic Orchestra at the Stockholm Concert Hall in Stockholm, Sweden. Böcker indicated at the Tampere performance that the reason behind the extra encore piano performance of "You're Not Alone" featured in the concert, like the prior extra encore piece in the Tampere performance of the original Final Symphony, was due to it being the home country of Valtonen and Wanamo and that Merregnon would likely continue the trend in the future. Selections from the concert, along with ones from Symphonic Fantasies and Final Symphony, were performed at Symphonic Memories concerts on 9 June 2018, in Stockholm, 14 March in Oulu, Finland, 6 June in St. Gallen, Switzerland, and 14 December 2019 in Kawasaki, Japan. An album for the concert, Symphonic Memories Concert - music from Square Enix, was released on 24 September 2020, containing a recording of the Kawasaki concert, including a rendition of "Final Fantasy VIII – Mono no aware".

=== Set list ===
Set list
#	Suite	Original pieces
1.	"In a Roundabout Way – Fanfare"	—
2.	"Final Fantasy XIII – Utopia in the Sky"	"Prelude to Final Fantasy XIII", "Vanille's Theme", "Nautilus", "Fang's Theme", "Blinded by Light", "Serah's Theme"
3.	"Final Fantasy IX – For the People of Gaia"	"Memories Erased by a Storm", "Zidane's Theme", "Vivi's Theme", "Festival of the Hunt", "Mourning the Sky", "Over the Hill", "Melodies of Life", "Unrequited Love", "Kuja's Theme", "Silver Dragon", "The Final Battle"
4.	"Encore: You're Not Alone" (since 2016, Tampere performance)	"You're Not Alone"
5.	"Final Fantasy VIII – Mono no aware"	"Liberi Fatali", "The Oath", "Waltz for the Moon", "Eyes on Me", "The Landing", "Succession of Witches", "A Sacrifice", "Don't be Afraid", "The Extreme", "Balamb Garden"
6.	"Final Fantasy V – Library of Ancients"	"Musica Machina", "Opening Theme", "Main Theme of Final Fantasy V", "Reina's Theme", "Clash on the Big Bridge", "Slumber of Ancient Earth", "Spreading Grand Wings", "Battle 1", "Prelude to the Void ", "The Evil Lord X-Death", "Sealed Away", "Ex-Death's Castle", "Sorrows of Parting", "Ending Theme", "Victory Fanfare"
7.	"Encore: Clash on the Big Bridge"	"Clash on the Big Bridge", "Chocobo Theme"
8.	"Encore: Main Theme of Final Fantasy"	"Main Theme of Final Fantasy"

== Album ==
Final Symphony II

Studio album by Royal Stockholm Philharmonic Orchestra, Mischa Cheung
- Released: 4 August 2023
- Recorded: 13–15 June 2023
- Genre: Classical, Video game music
- Length: 1:37:20
- Label: Merregnon Records / Laced Records
- Producer: Thomas Böcker

In July 2023, Merregnon Studios announced an album for Final Symphony II. Like the album for Final Symphony, which was recorded with the London Symphony Orchestra, the Final Symphony II album is again a studio recording and not a recording of a live concert, this time performed by the Royal Stockholm Philharmonic Orchestra. Prior to the album's release, the only available recordings of the concert were recordings of the Final Fantasy VIII section of the Stockholm and Kawasaki performances, released in 2016 and 2020.

The album, released on 4 August, reached #2 on the Classical Crossover Billboard charts in the week of 19 August 2023. On 20 August, it was awarded the "Album of the Week" on the classical music radio station NPO Klassiek. Benjamin Schmädig of Eurogamer Germany remarked in his article that on the album "every moment lends a majestic elegance to the familiar melodies". Tien Hoang of VGMOnline, in a review of the album, felt that the album and symphony had "less adventurous development of themes than in the first Final Symphony", with the result that it was more "accessible" but not quite as "sophisticated". He concluded, however, that it was "another resounding success". Alex Donaldson of VG247 found the arrangements and performances to be "incredible achievements", Jérémie Kermarrec of Final Fantasy World stated that the album featured "some of Final Fantasy's most remarkable re-orchestrations, richly thought out and executed", and Patrick Gann of RPGFan commended it as a "crowning achievement celebrating some of the more overlooked entries in the Final Fantasy series".

Final Symphony II
#	Track name	Arranger	Composer	Length
1.	"Fanfare: In a Roundabout Way"	—	Jonne Valtonen	3:37
2.	"Final Fantasy XIII: Utopia in the Sky"	Masashi Hamauzu, Valtonen	Hamauzu	16:22
3.	"Final Fantasy IX: For the People of Gaia"	Roger Wanamo	Nobuo Uematsu	21:49
4.	"Encore: Final Fantasy IX: Not Alone"	Wanamo	Uematsu	2:59
5.	"Final Fantasy VIII: Mono no aware"	Wanamo	Uematsu	21:08
6.	"Final Fantasy V: Library of Ancients"	Valtonen	Uematsu	22:10
7.	"Encore: Final Fantasy V: Battle at the Big Bridge"	Valtonen	Uematsu	4:45
8.	"Encore: Final Fantasy: Main Theme"	Wanamo	Uematsu	4:30

== Reception ==
The Final Symphony II concerts have received rave reviews from critics, who viewed it as a high-quality extension of the original Final Symphony concert series rather than a completely unique orchestral experience. A review of the premier concert in Bonn by Markus Roth of Video Game Music Online claimed that "the Final Symphony series is a masterclass concert series, which easily lends itself to musical discussion and interpretation of the highest standards", and that the second concert series was the equal to the original. Joe Hammond of Video Game Music Online, in a review of the London performance, said that Final Symphony II "wasn't reinventing the wheel or revolutionising what the team have already done, it was triumphantly expanding on previous success". He felt that the concert series was "lighter and more accessible" than the original due to its use of fewer and less complicated types of orchestral arrangements, and that Merregnon Studios did not "try to push the boundaries" but instead tried to "expand on the success of the Final Symphony 1 programme with other games in the series", in his opinion successfully. Stephen Little of Cubed Gamers, reviewing the same concert, termed it "stunning" and "a pleasure to watch, listen and be involved in", while John Son of Cubed3 said that the concert was "one of the best performances of video game music to have ever been showcased". A review of the Tampere concert by Nikolas Broman of Original Sound Version—his fifth Final Symphony II performance attendance—agreed with Hammond, stating that while he felt the original series was better, as it had more interesting arrangement styles and a more even quality, that audiences seemed to prefer the second series as "the arrangements were safer, the melodies closer to the originals, and overall it was perhaps easier to follow". He felt that the Final Fantasy IX section was the best, with the Final Fantasy XIII section as the weakest as "good... but nothing special". Regardless, he claimed that he could only compare Final Symphony II to the original series "because it doesn't make sense to compare it to anything else. It is leaps and bounds above any other major game music concert series".

== See also ==
- Music of Final Fantasy V
- Music of Final Fantasy VIII
- Music of Final Fantasy IX
- Music of Final Fantasy XIII
