= Final Symphony =

Concert tour of music from the Final Fantasy video game series

- Orchestral concert tour by Merregnon Studios
- Conductor: Eckehard Stier
- Composer: Nobuo Uematsu, Masashi Hamauzu, Jonne Valtonen
- Arrangers: Masashi Hamauzu, Jonne Valtonen, Roger Wanamo
- Location: Germany, England, Japan, Denmark, Sweden, Finland, Netherlands, United States, New Zealand, China, Austria, Australia, Poland, Canada, Belgium
- Album recording: Final Symphony
- Start date: May 11, 2013
- Producer: Thomas Böcker (Merregnon Studios)

Merregnon Studios concert chronology
- Symphonic Odysseys (2011, 2017); Final Symphony (2013–); Final Symphony II (2015–)

Final Symphony is a symphonic concert tour first held at the Historische Stadthalle Wuppertal in Wuppertal (Germany) on May 11, 2013. The concert tour features arrangements of video game music selected from the Final Fantasy series, specifically Final Fantasy VI, VII, and X. It is divided into three acts: a symphonic poem for VI, a piano concerto for X, and a symphony for VII. The concert is produced and directed by Thomas Böcker, with arrangements provided by Finnish composer and musician Jonne Valtonen, along with Roger Wanamo and Final Fantasy X composer Masashi Hamauzu with consultation from Final Fantasy composer Nobuo Uematsu. The original works were composed by Uematsu and Hamauzu, and an introductory piece was composed by Valtonen. The premiere concert was performed by the Wuppertal Symphony Orchestra under conduction from Eckehard Stier, with guest performer Benyamin Nuss joining the orchestra on piano.

Following the initial performance, Final Symphony was performed in several other venues. It was first performed in London (United Kingdom) at the Barbican Centre by the London Symphony Orchestra on May 30, 2013. Between 2014 and 2026, additional concerts took place in Tokyo (Japan), Aarhus (Denmark), Stockholm (Sweden), Tampere (Finland), Amsterdam (Netherlands), San Diego (United States), Baltimore (United States), San Francisco (United States), Auckland (New Zealand), Hong Kong (Special Administrative Region of the People's Republic of China), Hamburg (Germany), Berlin (Germany), Munich (Germany), Vienna (Austria), Melbourne (Australia), Birmingham (United Kingdom), Newcastle (United Kingdom), Stuttgart (Germany), Wrocław (Poland), Malmö (Sweden), Edinburgh (Scotland), Glasgow (Scotland), Ottawa (Canada), Vancouver (Canada), Des Moines (United States), Liège (Belgium), Winnipeg (Canada), Kansas City (United States) as well as Edmonton (Canada), with each performance location handled by a different orchestra. The next performance is scheduled to take place in 2026 in Phoenix (United States).

A video of the Stockholm performance of the Final Fantasy VI Symphonic Poem was released on October 11, 2014, and a full album recorded by the London Symphony Orchestra at Abbey Road Studios was released on February 23, 2015 by Merregnon Studios. The album, along with the concerts themselves, were heavily praised, both for the quality of the performance and for the quality of the arrangements, which overlaid themes from multiple pieces rather than relying on a more traditional medley. The concert series was followed by Final Symphony II, a similar concert tour by Merregnon Studios which began in 2015 with music from Final Fantasy V, VIII, IX, and XIII.

== Concert ==
=== Production ===
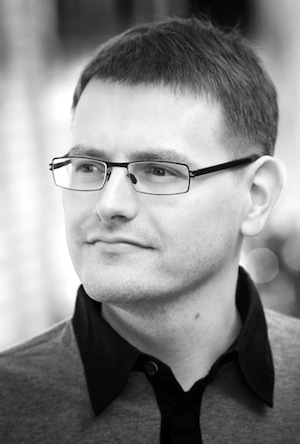
Producer Thomas Böcker in 2010

Thomas Böcker first began producing orchestral concerts of video game music in 2003 with the first Symphonic Game Music Concert in Leipzig, Germany. In 2008, he, through his production company Merregnon Studios, began a series of four concerts of video game music that used longer, more elaborate arrangements of themes from the individual pieces of music from the games. This Symphonic series of concerts stood in contrast to the more standard concerts, which played straightforward orchestral versions of individual songs. The four concerts were Symphonic Shades – Hülsbeck in Concert (2008), Symphonic Fantasies: Music from Square Enix (2009), Symphonic Legends – Music from Nintendo (2010), and Symphonic Odysseys: Tribute to Nobuo Uematsu (2011). Both Symphonic Fantasies and Symphonic Odysseys featured music from the Final Fantasy series composed by Nobuo Uematsu. Böcker has said that he considers Uematsu to be "the most famous composer of video game music and in general one of the most influential", and that Uematsu's 20020220 - Music from Final Fantasy concert in 2002 was a big influence on his own concerts.

By May 2012, Böcker was working on a concert of music solely from the Final Fantasy series, titled Final Symphony. The idea for the concert was first proposed by Uematsu in 2009 after Symphonic Fantasies; the concert had featured Final Fantasy music as one of its four components, but unlike the other three the music had been a straightforward medley rather than a more complicated arrangement. Uematsu had asked the team to keep the arrangements similar to those in other Final Fantasy concerts, but after the concert he felt that an opportunity had been missed to create something unique like the other three arrangements, especially the Secret of Mana section. He encouraged Böcker to take more liberties with the source material if the opportunity arose, and hoped that another concert could be created in the future. Böcker proposed Final Symphony later that year to Uematsu, and got approval from Square Enix while coordinating a Tokyo concert of Symphonic Fantasies. Final Symphony is the first concert consisting entirely of new Final Fantasy arrangements in over ten years, since 20020220 - Music from Final Fantasy.

Böcker and the arrangers intended the arrangements in the concert to be "about telling the stories of the games". In order to "capture the atmosphere of the games", they limited the concert to three games from the series, so as not to spread the concert too thin. They chose the games to be Final Fantasy VI, VII, and X, not only because they liked the music in the games but because they felt previous concerts, including to an extent Symphonic Fantasies and Odysseys, had failed to evoke the feeling of the games due to focusing on the battle music in an unbalanced manner. In an interview Böcker used Final Fantasy VII as an example, stating that only part of "the game's dark, romantic, melancholic, and hopeful story" was being portrayed by solely orchestrating the battle music from the game. Böcker wanted to focus on "longer pieces [and] deeper storytelling" than other concerts like the Distant Worlds series, so as to offer fans "something they really never heard before". Final Symphony was the first concert produced by Merregnon Studios without outside financial support, and Böcker regards it as the riskiest venture Merregnon Studios had undertaken to date, as they could only rely on their own belief that audiences would respond strongly enough to the concert for it to be successful despite the production costs of producing a concert of the quality they wanted.

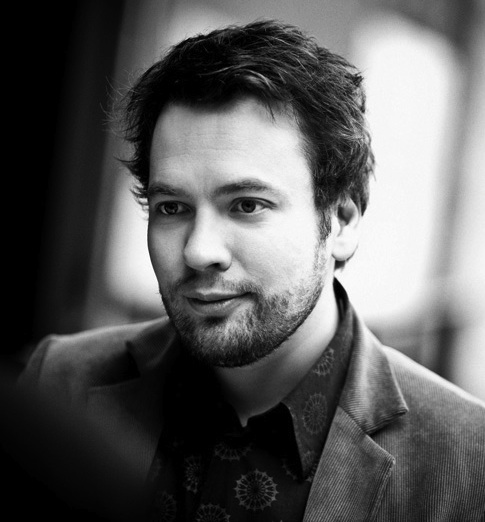
Arranger Jonne Valtonen in 2010

Jonne Valtonen, Roger Wanamo, and Masashi Hamauzu created the arrangements for the concert. Valtonen and Wanamo had previously worked with Böcker on the concerts in the Symphonic series, and Böcker has stated that if they had been unavailable for the project he would not have created Final Symphony at all. Hamauzu, in addition to arranging the Final Fantasy X music, was one of the composers of the original pieces he arranged. Uematsu, who composed music for all three games, served as a consultant for the project, though he did not arrange any pieces. When they first began the project, Böcker, Valtonen, and Wanamo took a few months to play through the games, watch playthrough videos, and read reviews and analyses of the games. They did not research other arrangements that have been done of the pieces, as they feel the general approach to video game music orchestration is very different from their style. They then got together to propose which tracks would be arranged, and decide which soundtracks worked best as a piano concerto, a symphonic poem, or a symphony. They chose a symphonic poem for VI, a piano concerto for X, and a symphony in three movements for VII. As director and producer, Böcker was involved in the work on the arrangements from the beginning. He set the direction and was able to comment on the progress of the arrangers' work via e-mail and ICQ. He has emphasised, however, that Valtonen and Wanamo are "masters of their art" and were given all the necessary artistic freedom.

The Final Fantasy VI poem follows the journey of Terra Branford, "the heroine born with the gift of magic". The poem explores the stages of her life through the game, as she escapes from slavery, faces her amnesia, discovers the source of her powers, and saves the world from the insane Kefka Palazzo. Final Fantasy VI was the first Final Fantasy game that Wanamo had played, and he wanted to tell the story of the game as it felt to him. Wanamo has described the arrangement as the most difficult one he had done to date. Originally, the poem was going to follow the story of the group of heroes, before Wanamo made Terra the focus, and ended up dropping the themes of the other heroes due to length. The Final Fantasy X piano concerto was arranged by Hamauzu not to tell the story of the game, but to express the "continuum" of the series through the lens of the game. While inspired by the game's story, Hamauzu also drew inspiration from the rest of the franchise to make the concerto more than "a series of separate scenes and stories". He feels that a hallmark of Böcker's concerts is that they are not limited to directly translating the original works, but instead tie them to a wider creative process. Valtonen created the three movements of the Final Fantasy VII symphony to show three aspects of the game's setting. The first movement, "Nibelheim Incident", follows the villain Sephiroth in his journey through the game; the second, "Words Drowned by Fireworks", explores the relationship between Cloud Strife, Aerith Gainsborough, and Tifa Lockhart; while the third movement, "The Planet's Crisis", depicts the final clash between Cloud and Sephiroth. He tried to "bring out both the darkest moments as well as the heart" of the game.

=== Performances ===
Performances
Date	City	Country	Venue	Orchestra	Concerts
May 11, 2013	Wuppertal	Germany	Historische Stadthalle Wuppertal	Wuppertal Symphony Orchestra	2
May 30, 2013	London	England	Barbican Centre	London Symphony Orchestra	1
May 4, 2014	Tokyo	Japan	Tokyo Bunka Kaikan	Tokyo Philharmonic Orchestra	2
May 9, 2014	Aarhus	Denmark	Musikhuset	Aarhus Symphony Orchestra	1
June 18, 2014	Stockholm	Sweden	Konserthuset	Royal Stockholm Philharmonic Orchestra	1
September 12, 2014	Tampere	Finland	Tampere Hall	Tampere Philharmonic Orchestra	1
May 7, 2016	Amsterdam	Netherlands	Concertgebouw Amsterdam	Netherlands Philharmonic Orchestra	1
July 21, 2016	San Diego	United States	Copley Symphony Hall	San Diego Symphony Orchestra	1
July 23, 2016	Baltimore	United States	Meyerhoff Symphony Hall	Baltimore Symphony Orchestra	1
July 27, 2016	San Francisco	United States	Davies Symphony Hall	San Francisco Symphony	1
October 21-22, 2016	Auckland	New Zealand	ASB Theatre, Aotea Centre	Auckland Philharmonia Orchestra	2
November 22-23, 2017	Hong Kong	China	HK Cultural Centre Concert Hall	Hong Kong Philharmonic Orchestra	2
March 2, 2018	Hamburg	Germany	Laeiszhalle Hamburg	Filmorchester Babelsberg	1
March 4, 2018	Berlin	Germany	Berliner Philharmonie	Filmorchester Babelsberg	1
March 14, 2018	Munich	Germany	Philharmonie Munich	Filmorchester Babelsberg	1
March 17, 2018	Vienna	Austria	Konzerthaus Vienna	Filmorchester Babelsberg	1
September 28-29, 2018	Melbourne	Australia	Hamer Hall, Melbourne	Melbourne Symphony Orchestra	2
April 16, 2023	Birmingham	United Kingdom	Symphony Hall Birmingham	City of Birmingham Symphony Orchestra	1
June 4, 2023	Newcastle	United Kingdom	Sage Gateshead	Royal Northern Sinfonia	1
September 20, 2023	Stuttgart	Germany	Theaterhaus Stuttgart	Stuttgarter Philharmoniker	1
October 14, 2023	Wrocław	Poland	National Forum of Music	NFM Wrocław Philharmonic	1
April 4-5, 2024	Malmö	Sweden	Malmö Live Konserthus	Malmö Symphony Orchestra	2
November 8, 2024	Edinburgh	Scotland	Usher Hall	Royal Scottish National Orchestra	1
November 9, 2024	Glasgow	Scotland	Glasgow Royal Concert Hall	Royal Scottish National Orchestra	1
January 10-11, 2025	Ottawa	Canada	Southam Hall	NAC Orchestra	2
February 5, 2025	Vancouver	Canada	Orpheum	Vancouver Symphony Orchestra	1
April 26, 2025	Des Moines	United States	Des Moines Civic Center	Des Moines Symphony	1
February 6-7, 2026	Liège	Belgium	Salle Philharmonique	Orchestre Philharmonique Royal de Liège	2
March 22, 2026	Winnipeg	Canada	Centennial Concert Hall	FILMharmonique Orchestra	1
March 25-26, 2026	Kansas City	United States	Kauffman Center	Kansas City Symphony	2
June 5-6, 2026	Edmonton	Canada	Winspear Centre	Edmonton Symphony Orchestra	3
October 3-4, 2026	Phoenix	United States	Phoenix Symphony Hall	Phoenix Symphony	2

The first performance of Final Symphony was in Wuppertal, Germany at the Historische Stadthalle Wuppertal on May 11, 2013. The concert was held twice that day, performed by the Wuppertal Symphony Orchestra, and was conducted by Eckehard Stier, who had previously conducted for Symphonic Fantasies in Tokyo. It featured Benyamin Nuss, who had also performed in Symphonic Fantasies, on piano for the Final Fantasy X piano concerto. The concert was performed again on May 30 at the Barbican Centre in London, England by the London Symphony Orchestra. It was the first concert of video game music by the orchestra. Stier and Nuss repeated their performances from the premier. The following year, the concert was presented in four more locations. Stier conducted for all four performances, while Katharina Treutler replaced Nuss for the Tokyo, Aarhus, and Stockholm concerts, and Mischa Cheung performed in Tampere. The arrangements were slightly modified for the 2014 performances, and a new encore piece, "Suteki da ne", was performed at the Tampere concert.

The Tokyo concert was the first video game music concert in Japan to receive a standing ovation, according to Merregnon Studios. It was described by both Dengeki Online and Famitsu as magnificent, with a bold and refreshing style that was met with "thunderous applause". The London performance was also praised by critics; Joe Hammond of Video Game Music Online, Ed Williams of The 405, and Mariusz Borkowski of Gamemusic.pl all praised the concert for its powerful performance as both video game and classical music, and Audun Sorlie of Original Sound Version noted the fierce applause and standing ovations at both the London and Wuppertal performances. In 2016, Final Symphony made its North American debut. Final Fantasy creator Hironobu Sakaguchi was present for concert and audience Q&A sessions at the California shows, the concert in San Francisco boasted a crowd of over 2,700 and made it the largest ever audience for a single performance produced by Merregnon Studios.

Parts of the Final Symphony programme have been presented over the years by various orchestras, such as by the Munich Radio Orchestra at the Prince Regent Theatre Munich, the London Symphony Orchestra at the Philharmonie de Paris, the Württembergische Philharmonie Reutlingen at the Stadthalle Reutlingen and the Dortmunder Philharmoniker at the Theater Dortmund. This approach was continued in Böcker's later production Symphonic Memories – Music from Square Enix, which premiered in 2018 with the Royal Stockholm Philharmonic Orchestra at the Konserthuset Stockholm and has since been performed by the Oulu Symphony Orchestra at the Oulu Music Centre, the St. Gallen Symphony Orchestra at the Tonhalle St. Gallen, the Kanagawa Philharmonic Orchestra at Culttz Kawasaki and the Staatsphilharmonie Rheinland-Pfalz at the Pfalzbau Ludwigshafen.

=== Set list ===
Set list
#	Suite	Original pieces
1.	"Fantasy Overture – Circle within a circle within a circle"	—
2.	"Final Fantasy VI – Symphonic Poem (Born with the Gift of Magic)"	"Overture", "Terra's Theme", "The Gestahl Empire", "Kefka", "Esper World", "Metamorphosis", "Omen", "Battle", "The Unforgiven", "Save Them!", "Dancing Mad"
3.	"Final Fantasy X – Piano Concerto" (I. Zanarkand, II. Inori, III. Kessen)	"Zanarkand", "Besaid", "Hymn of the Fayth", "The Sending" (2014–present performances), "Thunder Plains", "Yuna's Decision", "Assault", "Final Battle"
4.	"Encore: Suteki da ne" (2014–present performances)	"Suteki da ne"
5.	"Final Fantasy VII – Symphony in Three Movements" (I. Nibelheim Incident, II. Words Drowned by Fireworks, III. The Planet's Crisis)	"Those Chosen By the Planet", "One-Winged Angel", "Opening", "Prelude", "Who...Am I?", "J-E-N-O-V-A", "Trail of Blood", "Main Theme of Final Fantasy VII", "Aerith's Theme", "Tifa's Theme", "Words Drowned by Fireworks", "Cid's Theme", "Countdown", "The Great Warrior", "Jenova Complete", "Lifestream", "The Planet's Crisis"
6.	"Encore: Continue?"	"Prelude", "Continue", "Anxious Heart"
7.	"Encore: Fight, Fight, Fight!"	"Battle to the Death", "Those Who Fight Further", "The Decisive Battle", "Otherworld", "Mog's Theme" (2013 performances only)

== Album ==
Final Symphony

Studio album by London Symphony Orchestra, Katharina Treutler
- Released: February 23, 2015
- Recorded: December 15–17, 2014
- Genres: Classical, Video game music
- Length: 1:34:30
- Label: X5 Music Group / Merregnon Records
- Producer: Thomas Böcker

In December 2014, Merregnon Studios produced an album for the concert. Unlike prior Merregnon Studios concert albums, the Final Symphony album did not record of one of the performances but was instead a studio recording of the London Symphony Orchestra at Abbey Road Studios, produced especially for the album. The version of the concert recorded was the one used in the final performance in Tampere, rather than the one originally performed by the London Symphony Orchestra in 2013. The performance was recorded on December 15–17, was conducted by Eckehard Stier, and featured a piano performance by Katharina Treutler. Nobuo Uematsu supervised the production of the album. The album was published by X5 Music Group, who had previously published the Symphonic Fantasies Tokyo (2012) album for Merregnon Studios. It was released as a digital album on February 23, 2015, while a preview of the album was performed on British radio station Classic FM on February 21. Prior to the album's release, the only available recording of the concert was a video of the Stockholm performance of the Final Fantasy VI symphonic poem by the Royal Stockholm Philharmonic Orchestra, released on their website on October 10, 2014. A physical version of the album was released on Blu-ray on September 16, 2015. A promotional mini-album was released on April 23, 2015, containing the Final Fantasy VI symphonic poem, and one part each from the Final Fantasy VII and X sections of the concert. In December 2016, Laced Records released the Final Symphony album on double CD and triple vinyl, as well as a double album combination with the Symphonic Fantasies Tokyo album. The Final Symphony album was re-released as a lossless digital album on Bandcamp for streaming and download on January 1, 2021.

The album was highly praised by critics. Stephen Meyerink of RPGFan described it as "the absolute top of the mountain in the world of video game music arrangement". He claimed that the "complexity and passion" of the concert could be appreciated by any music fan, but urged even mild fans of the source material to immediately buy the album. He praised the album's production values, saying that it was the closest a listener could get to the live performances from their home. Joe Hammond of Video Game Music Online also enthusiastically praised the album, declaring it not only the best album Merregnon Studios had ever produced but also "one of the best video game music albums ever made". He noted both the complexity and quality of the arrangements, calling them out as superior to the ones in Symphonic Fantasies and Symphonic Odysseys due to their narrow focus, as well as the "world class" performance of the London Symphony Orchestra on the recording. Classic FM noted the album as a "spectacular arrangement" that they compared to the best of film music while naming it their album of the week. The Final Symphony album reached the top position on the iTunes Classical Charts in over ten countries, as well as the top five classical albums on the Billboard charts and the Official UK Charts.

Final Symphony
#	Track name	Arranger	Composer	Length
1.	"Fantasy Overture (Circle within a Circle within a Circle)"	—	Jonne Valtonen	4:08
2.	"Final Fantasy VI (Symphonic Poem: Born with the Gift of Magic)"	Roger Wanamo	Nobuo Uematsu	18:07
3.	"Final Fantasy X (Piano Concerto): I. Zanarkand"	Masashi Hamauzu	Hamauzu, Uematsu	8:17
4.	"Final Fantasy X (Piano Concerto): II. Inori"	Hamauzu	Hamauzu, Uematsu	6:36
5.	"Final Fantasy X (Piano Concerto): III. Kessen"	Hamauzu	Hamauzu, Uematsu	4:21
6.	"Encore: Final Fantasy X (Suteki da ne)"	Wanamo	Uematsu	3:43
7.	"Final Fantasy VII (Symphony in Three Movements): I. Nibelheim Incident"	Valtonen	Uematsu	13:42
8.	"Final Fantasy VII (Symphony in Three Movements): II. Words Drowned by Fireworks"	Valtonen	Uematsu	13:38
9.	"Final Fantasy VII (Symphony in Three Movements): III. The Planet's Crisis"	Valtonen	Uematsu	14:06
10.	"Encore: Final Fantasy VII (Continue?)"	Valtonen	Uematsu	4:35
11.	"Encore: Final Fantasy Series (Fight, Fight, Fight!)"	Wanamo	Uematsu	3:17

== Legacy ==
Final Symphony was followed by Final Symphony II, a concert of music from Final Fantasy V, VIII, IX, and XIII. It features long arrangements like the Final Symphony concerts. The majority of the music was originally composed by Nobuo Uematsu, while the Final Fantasy XIII suite was originally composed by Masashi Hamauzu. Valtonen created the arrangements for the Final Fantasy V section, Wanamo worked on the VIII and IX portions, and Hamauzu arranged his own compositions from XIII with orchestration by Valtonen. The concert was performed at the Barbican Centre in London by the London Symphony Orchestra on September 12, 2015, and later an earlier performance on August 29 in Bonn, Germany by the Beethoven Orchestra Bonn. After the debut performances, the London Symphony Orchestra traveled to Japan to perform the concert there three times: in Osaka at the Festival Hall on September 27, and twice in Yokohama at the Minato Mirai Hall on October 4. 2016 performances of the concert included a concert on April 1 at the Tampere Hall in Tampere, Finland by the Tampere Philharmonic Orchestra, and a June 9 concert by the Royal Stockholm Philharmonic Orchestra at the Konserthuset in Stockholm, Sweden. Two concerts were performed in 2019, with the Netherlands Philharmonic Orchestra on 5 July at the Concertgebouw in Amsterdam, and one day later by the Essen Philharmonic Orchestra at the Philharmonic Hall in Essen.

== See also ==
- Music of Final Fantasy VI
- Music of the Final Fantasy VII series
- Music of Final Fantasy X
