= Merregnon Studios =

German production company

- Type: Concert and orchestra recording production
- Industry: Video games, orchestra, recording
- Founded: 1999
- Headquarters: Dresden, Germany 51.0520515°N 13.7410747°E
- Key people: Thomas Böcker

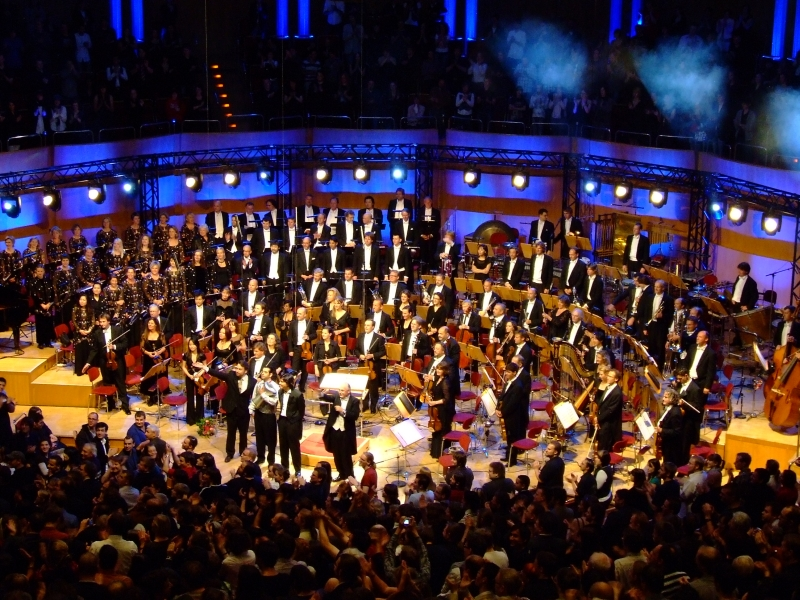
The participants of Symphonic Fantasies after the performance of the concert

Merregnon Studios is a company based in Dresden, Germany, founded by Thomas Böcker. It produces recordings and concerts worldwide, including the orchestral Merregnon and Game Concerts series.

== History ==
Merregnon Studios was founded in 1999 by Thomas Böcker. Having spent time in Japan and as a lifelong fan of video game music, Böcker sought to bring orchestral video game music concerts to Europe and produce storytelling arrangements and scores. The earliest example of his vision came with the first volume in the Merregnon CD series in 2000. His role as executive producer and project director provided him with contacts to conductors, orchestras and composers from around the world, and he began to develop the concept of a series of video game music orchestra concerts. Inspired by game concerts from Japan, the Orchestral Game Music Concerts from the 1990s in particular, he produced the first concert event of its kind outside Japan in 2003, the Symphonic Game Music Concert during the Games Convention in Leipzig, the first trade fair for video games in Europe. The success of the event led to his ongoing international series Game Concerts.

Besides concert productions, Merregnon Studios has produced and directed numerous orchestral video game music recordings and albums including Masashi's Hamauzu's debut album Vielen Dank, SEGA's World Club Champion Football, Square Enix's drammatica -The Very Best of Yoko Shimomura and Bethesda Softworks' 10th Anniversary Concert for The Elder Scrolls V: Skyrim.

=== Game Concerts in Leipzig (2003 - 2007) ===
On August 20, 2003 Thomas Böcker produced his first Game Concert as a part of the official opening ceremony of the Leipzig Games Convention, performed by the Czech National Symphony Orchestra at the Gewandhaus Leipzig, promoted by the Leipzig Trade Fair. Following the success of the event, further four annual concerts with various programmes took place under his direction until 2007, performed by the FILMharmonic Orchestra Prague.

=== Game Concerts in Cologne (2008 - 2012) ===
Symphonic Shades – Hülsbeck in Concert (2008) in honour of German composer Chris Hülsbeck was the first of five annual concerts by the WDR Funkhausorchester featuring music from video games, followed by Symphonic Fantasies – Music from Square Enix (2009 and 2012), dedicated to music by the Japanese game developer Square Enix.

Symphonic Legends – Music from Nintendo (2010) focused on video game music by the Japanese game developer Nintendo, while Symphonic Odysseys — Tribute to Nobuo Uematsu (2011) was a tribute to the Japanese composer Nobuo Uematsu.

=== Game Concerts worldwide (from 2013) ===
Final Symphony (2013) is a concert production featuring music from Final Fantasy VI, VII and X. The world premiere was performed by the Sinfonieorchester Wuppertal. Shortly after, the programme embarked on a world tour including the first performance of game music by the London Symphony Orchestra. The debut concert of Final Symphony II (2015) with music from Final Fantasy V, VIII, IX and XIII was presented by the Beethoven Orchester Bonn.

Symphonic Memories – Music from Square Enix (2018) including video game music by Square Enix was first presented by the Royal Stockholm Philharmonic Orchestra. In 2021, for the tenth anniversary of Bethesda Softworks' action role-playing game Skyrim, Böcker produced a concert film featuring the London Symphony Orchestra and London Voices. In 2023, he produced another film for the game Starfield, again with the London Symphony Orchestra.

=== Merregnon: Land of Silence (from 2021) ===
Merregnon: Land of Silence (2021) is a symphonic fairy tale with music by Yoko Shimomura. It was produced by Thomas Böcker to introduce young people and families to orchestral music through modern means, using a game and anime aesthetic. The work was premiered and filmed by the Royal Stockholm Philharmonic Orchestra before embarking on a world-tour.

=== Merregnon: Heart of Ice (2024) ===
Merregnon: Heart of Ice (2024) was first announced on April 20, 2023. The music is composed by Nobuo Uematsu. The world premiere is scheduled for February 29, 2024 in Ludwigshafen, Germany, with the Staatsphilharmonie Rheinland-Pfalz presenting the music.

== Discography ==
Orchestrations and Production
Year	Title	Credits	Composers
2000	Merregnon Soundtrack Volume 1	Executive Producer, Project Director	Fabian Del Priore, Jonne Valtonen, Jogeir Liljedahl, Allister Brimble, Olof Gustafsson, Rudolf Stember, Markus Holler, Gustaf Grefberg, Jason Chong, Chris Hülsbeck
2004	Merregnon Soundtrack Volume 2	Executive Producer, Project Director	Fabian Del Priore, Gustaf Grefberg, Yuzo Koshiro, Olof Gustafsson, Jonne Valtonen, Allister Brimble, Markus Holler, Andy Brick, Chris Hülsbeck
2005	Wangan MIDNIGHT MAXIMUMTUNE 2 ORIGINAL SOUNDTRACK	Special Thanks	Yuzo Koshiro
2006	Immortal 3	Producer (Pinball Dreams, Pinball Fantasies)	Chris Hülsbeck, Bjørn Lynne, Tim Follin, and many others.
2007	Vielen Dank	Production Coordinator, Translation	Masashi Hamauzu
2007	Wangan MIDNIGHT MAXIMUMTUNE 3 ORIGINAL SOUNDTRACK	Special Thanks	Yuzo Koshiro
2007	Distant Worlds	Production Consultant	Nobuo Uematsu
2008	drammatica -The Very Best of Yoko Shimomura-	Production Coordinator, Translation	Yoko Shimomura
2008	Musica e WCCF secondo movimento	Production Coordinator, Translation	Takenobu Mitsuyoshi
2010	LORD of ARCANA ORIGINAL SOUND COLLECTION	Coordinator	Nobuo Uematsu, Kenichiro Fukui, Satoshi Henmi
2010	Distant Worlds II	Production Consultant	Nobuo Uematsu
2012	Dragon's Dogma Original Soundtrack	Music Orchestration, Supervision, Coordinator	Tadayoshi Makino, Inon Zur, Rei Kondoh, Chamy.Ishi
2013	Turrican Soundtrack Anthology	Co-Producer	Chris Hülsbeck
2016	Turrican II - The Orchestral Album	Co-Producer	Chris Hülsbeck
2016	Albion Online	Orchestra Production Coordinator	Jonne Valtonen
2017	Turrican - Orchestral Selections	Co-Producer	Chris Hülsbeck
2018	Turrican - Rise of the Machine	Co-Producer	Chris Hülsbeck
2019	PUBG - Erangel Orchestra	Production Coordinator	PUBG Corporation / Tencent
2020	PUBG Mobile - Theme Music, Orchestral Version	Production Coordinator	PUBG Corporation / Tencent
2021	Albion Online	Orchestra Production Coordinator	Jonne Valtonen, Marie Havemann
2026	Merregnon: Heart of Ice	Creator, Director, Executive Producer	Nobuo Uematsu
Concert recordings
Year	Title	Credits	Publisher
2008	Symphonic Shades	Creator, Executive Producer	synSONIQ Records
2010	Symphonic Fantasies	Creator, Executive Producer	Decca, Square Enix
2011	Symphonic Odysseys	Creator, Consultant	Dog Ear Records
2012	Symphonic Fantasies Tokyo	Creator, Executive Producer	MAZ Sound Tools, X5Music, Laced Records, Merregnon Records
2015	Final Symphony	Creator, Executive Producer	X5Music, Square Enix, Merregnon Records
2020	Symphonic Memories	Creator, Consultant	Square Enix
2021	Merregnon: Land of Silence	Creator, Director, Executive Producer	Royal Stockholm Philharmonic Orchestra, Merregnon Studios
2021	Skyrim 10th Anniversary Concert	Producer	Bethesda Softworks
2023	Final Symphony II	Creator, Executive Producer	Merregnon Records
2023	Starfield - A Night with the London Symphony Orchestra	Producer	Bethesda Softworks

== Awards ==
- 2010 Best Concert: Symphonic Legends - music from Nintendo, Swedish LEVEL magazine
- 2010 Best Arranged Album - Solo / Ensemble: Symphonic Fantasies - music from Square Enix, Annual Game Music Awards 2010
- 2011 Best Live Concert: Symphonic Legends – music from Nintendo, Annual Original Sound Version Awards 2010
- 2011 Best Live Concert: Symphonic Odysseys – Tribute to Nobuo Uematsu, Annual Original Sound Version Awards 2011
- 2011 Outstanding Production – Concert: Symphonic Odysseys – Tribute to Nobuo Uematsu, Annual Game Music Awards 2011
- 2012 Outstanding Production - Concert: Symphonic Fantasies Tokyo - music from Square Enix, Annual Game Music Awards 2012
- 2013 Outstanding Production - Concert: Final Symphony London - music from Final Fantasy, Annual Game Music Awards 2013
- 2015 First person to produce a video game concert outside Japan: Thomas Böcker, Guinness World Records
- 2015 Outstanding Entrepreneurship - Cultural and Creative Pilots Award: Thomas Böcker, German Federal Government
- 2015 Best Album - Arranged Album: Final Symphony - music from Final Fantasy, Annual Game Music Awards 2015
- 2020 Best Album - Official Arranged Album: Symphonic Memories Concert – music from Square Enix, Annual Game Music Awards 2020
