= Thomas Böcker =

German producer (born 1977)

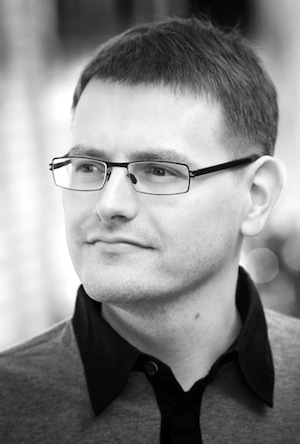
- Thomas Böcker in 2010
- Born: 1977 (age 48–49)
- Occupations: Producer, artistic director
- Years active: 1999–present

Thomas Böcker (born 1977) is a German producer. He is the founder of Merregnon Studios and artistic director of the orchestral music projects Merregnon and Game Concerts.

In 2003, Böcker produced the first live orchestral performance of video game music outside Japan at the Gewandhaus in Leipzig, leading to his international Game Concerts series. His later productions include Final Symphony, based on music from the Final Fantasy series, which in 2013 marked the London Symphony Orchestra's first live performance of music from video games.

From 2021, Böcker developed original symphonic fairy tales under the Merregnon name, beginning with Merregnon: Land of Silence, composed by Yoko Shimomura and premiered by the Royal Stockholm Philharmonic Orchestra. It was followed by Merregnon: Heart of Ice, composed by Nobuo Uematsu, recorded with the London Symphony Orchestra and released by Decca Classics in 2026, featuring English narration by Alicia Vikander.

== Early life ==
A Commodore 64 brought home by Böcker's father introduced him to computers at the age of seven. He developed an early interest in video game music, particularly the work of Chris Huelsbeck.

== Career ==
Böcker's early production work included Merregnon – Soundtrack Volume 1, a concept album released in 2000. It combined music by several video game composers within a fantasy narrative. While producing Merregnon – Soundtrack Volume 2, he first worked with a live orchestra during recording sessions in Prague in 2002, an experience he later described as laying the foundation for his subsequent concert productions.

=== Game Concerts in Leipzig (2003–2007) ===
On 20 August 2003, Böcker produced the first Game Concert as part of the opening ceremony of the Leipzig Games Convention. The programme was performed at the Gewandhaus by the Czech National Symphony Orchestra. Four further annual concerts followed through 2007. Guest composers included Nobuo Uematsu, Yuzo Koshiro and Chris Huelsbeck.

=== Game Concerts in Cologne (2008–2012) ===
In 2007, WDR Funkhausorchester manager Winfried Fechner attended the final Leipzig concert at Böcker's invitation; Fechner later recalled that the visit led to their decision to present game music with the orchestra.

From 2008, Böcker produced a series of video game music programmes with the WDR Funkhausorchester in Cologne. The first, Symphonic Shades – Hülsbeck in Concert, was devoted to the music of Chris Huelsbeck, and a recording of the concerts was released in the same year.

Symphonic Fantasies – Music from Square Enix followed in 2009 and was also performed in Tokyo, Stockholm and London. Recordings of performances in Cologne and Tokyo were released.

Symphonic Legends – Music from Nintendo followed in 2010, focusing on music from Nintendo video games. In 2011, Böcker produced Symphonic Odysseys – Tribute to Nobuo Uematsu. A recording of the Cologne concerts was released as a double album, and the programme was later performed by the London Symphony Orchestra at the Philharmonie de Paris and the Barbican Centre.

=== Game Concerts worldwide (from 2013) ===
Final Symphony is a concert production by Böcker featuring music from Final Fantasy VI, VII and X. The world premiere was performed by the Sinfonieorchester Wuppertal on 11 May 2013, followed later that month by a performance with the London Symphony Orchestra. The programme then toured internationally. A studio album recorded with the London Symphony Orchestra at Abbey Road Studios was released in 2015.

Final Symphony II, featuring music from Final Fantasy V, VIII, IX and XIII, premiered with the Beethoven Orchester Bonn in August 2015. It was later performed by the London Symphony Orchestra in London and Japan, while other performances took place in several European countries. A studio album recorded with the Royal Stockholm Philharmonic Orchestra was released in 2023.

In 2018, Symphonic Memories – Music from Square Enix premiered with the Royal Stockholm Philharmonic Orchestra at the Stockholm Concert Hall. The programme was also performed elsewhere in Europe and Japan. A 2019 performance in Kawasaki was recorded and released as an album in 2020.

Böcker has also produced orchestral concert films for video game publishers. In 2021, for the tenth anniversary of The Elder Scrolls V: Skyrim, he produced a concert film featuring the London Symphony Orchestra and London Voices at Alexandra Palace in London. In 2023, he produced Starfield – A Night with the London Symphony Orchestra, recorded at LSO St Luke's.

In 2025, Böcker produced the solo piano programme Piano Fantasies – music from SQUARE ENIX, featuring Mischa Cheung. A studio album was released in 2025, and following the programme's premiere in Tokyo, further performances took place in Stockholm and London in 2026.

=== Merregnon symphonic fairy tales (from 2021) ===
From 2021, Böcker developed original symphonic fairy tales under the Merregnon name, intended to introduce young audiences and families to orchestral music. Merregnon: Land of Silence and Merregnon: Heart of Ice were the first orchestral works by Yoko Shimomura and Nobuo Uematsu written specifically for the concert hall.

Merregnon: Land of Silence, with music by Shimomura, was conceived in the tradition of Sergei Prokofiev's Peter and the Wolf, while adopting a game and anime aesthetic. The work premiered in 2021 as a specially produced concert film with the Royal Stockholm Philharmonic Orchestra at the Stockholm Concert Hall. Additional performances included productions by the Hong Kong Philharmonic Orchestra and the Shanghai Symphony Orchestra.

Merregnon: Heart of Ice continued the concept with original music by Uematsu. The work premiered on 29 February 2024, performed by the Staatsphilharmonie Rheinland-Pfalz at the BASF Feierabendhaus. A studio album was recorded at Abbey Road Studios with the London Symphony Orchestra, featuring English narration by Alicia Vikander, and released worldwide by Decca Classics on 19 June 2026. A further concert performance followed on 25 June 2026 at the Philharmonie de Paris, performed by the Orchestre national d'Île-de-France.

== Awards and recognition ==
In 2015, Böcker received the national Cultural and Creative Pilots Award, which recognises entrepreneurs in Germany's cultural and creative industries. In the same year, Guinness World Records recognised the 2003 Leipzig concert as the first live video game concert held outside Japan.
