= Symphonic Odysseys =

Concert of music from video games by Nobuo Uematsu

Symphonic Odysseys: Tribute to Nobuo Uematsu
- Orchestral concert tour by Merregnon Studios
- Orchestra: WDR Rundfunkorchester Köln; London Symphony Orchestra
- Choir: WDR Radio Choir Cologne; London Symphony Chorus
- Conductor: Arnie Roth; Eckehard Stier
- Composer: Nobuo Uematsu
- Arrangers: Jonne Valtonen, Roger Wanamo, Masashi Hamauzu, Jani Laaksonen
- Location: Cologne, Germany; Paris, France; London, England
- Album recording: Symphonic Odysseys
- Dates: July 9, 2011; June 18, 2017; June 20, 2017
- Supporting acts: Benyamin Nuss; Juraj Čižmarovič; Mischa Cheung
- Producer: Thomas Böcker (Merregnon Studios)

Merregnon Studios concert chronology
- Symphonic Legends (2010); Symphonic Odysseys (2011, 2017); Final Symphony (2013–2018, 2023)

Symphonic Odysseys: Tribute to Nobuo Uematsu was a symphonic tribute concert first held in Cologne, Germany on July 9, 2011 at the Cologne Philharmonic Hall. The concert exclusively paid homage to the work of Japanese composer Nobuo Uematsu and featured music selected from his works as a video game music composer. Among the games featured were Lost Odyssey, Blue Dragon, Last Story, King's Knight, Chrono Trigger, Final Fantasy Legend, and selected works from the Final Fantasy series. The concert was produced and directed by Thomas Böcker, with arrangements provided by Finnish composer and musician Jonne Valtonen, along with Roger Wanamo, Masashi Hamauzu, and Jani Laaksonen. The concert was performed by the WDR Rundfunkorchester Köln and the WDR Radio Choir Cologne under conduction from Arnie Roth, with guest performers Benyamin Nuss and Juraj Čižmarovič joining the orchestra. A video recording of Symphonic Odysseys was streamed live online. The concert was initially scheduled for a single performance, but after selling out within twelve hours a second concert was added prior in the same day in Cologne. This too sold out, resulting in a total attendance of over 4000.

In June 2017, the London Symphony Orchestra and the London Symphony Chorus performed Symphonic Odysseys under the baton of Eckehard Stier, with guest performer Mischa Cheung. The first concert took place on 18 June at the Philharmonie de Paris in Paris, France, the second on 20 June at the Barbican Centre in London, United Kingdom. Same as in Cologne years before, Nobuo Uematsu was present at both events as guest of honour.

A recording of the concerts in Cologne was published as a two-disc album on December 28, 2011 by Dog Ear Records, Uematsu's own record label. The albums, along with the concerts themselves, received varied reviews, with some critics giving enthusiastic praise, especially in regards to the quality of the performance, the choice of source material, and the quality of the arrangements, while one critic greatly disliked several of the arrangements.

== Concert ==
=== Production ===
Thomas Böcker and then WDR Symphony Orchestra Cologne director Winfried Fechner began collaborating on orchestrated video game concerts in 2007, after Fechner had attended the Fifth Symphonic Game Music Concert held in Leipzig. As their ideas and plans materialized, three projects were set in motion to determine the interest of a younger audience in classical music performance and the aptitude of the WDR orchestra in focusing on a new source of compositions. The first project was PROMS: That's Sound, That's Rhythm, held in early 2008, featuring a mixture of classical works and video game music, ranging from works by Ralph Vaughan Williams and Morton Gould as well as arrangements of music from video games such as Shenmue and Castlevania previously featured in the Symphonic Game Music Concerts. The second project, held in August 2008, was a composer-specific concert titled Symphonic Shades – Hülsbeck in Concert, focusing entirely on the works of German video game composer Chris Hülsbeck, while the third project was a concert of music from the video games by Square Enix titled Symphonic Fantasies: Music from Square Enix, held in September 2009. A third "Symphonic" concert, Symphonic Legends – Music from Nintendo, was then held in September 2010, and afterwards Böcker decided to have one final production to close out the "Symphonic" series.

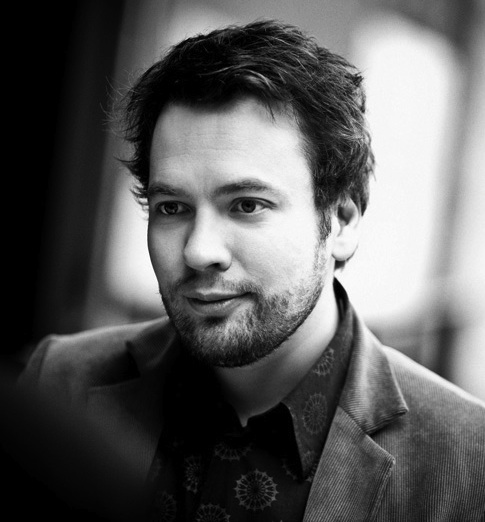
Arranger Jonne Valtonen in 2010

The fourth concert was first announced by Winfried Fechner in March 2010 as Symphonic Odysseys - Uematsu in Concert, with the subtitle later changed to "Tribute to Nobuo Uematsu". The sole composer featured in the concert is Nobuo Uematsu, a Japanese video game composer best known for his work at Square Enix, who is considered one of the most famous and respected composers in the video game community. He has composed the music for dozens of video games, including the majority of the Final Fantasy series, and his compositions had been a significant component of the Symphonic Fantasies concert. Böcker has said that he considers Uematsu to be "the most famous composer of video game music and in general one of the most influential", and that Uematsu's 20020220 - Music from Final Fantasy concert in 2002 was a big influence on his own concerts. The decision to focus the event on Uematsu was made in part due to Uematsu's own desire to one day hear a concert based on his compositions as a whole; he was also very interested in hearing more experimental arrangements of his pieces than have been done in the past after watching the Symphonic Fantasies concert. A website was set up for news and updates on the concert, including video messages from Nobuo Uematsu himself. Tickets for the concert went on sale on December 1, 2010, and were sold out within 12 hours, prompting the addition of a second performance to be held earlier in the afternoon of the same day. This too sold out, resulting in a total attendance of over 4000. Third and fourth performances were held almost six years later on June 18, 2017 in Paris, and June 20, 2017 in London, both by the London Symphony Orchestra.

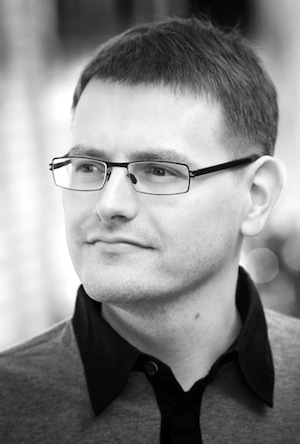
Producer Thomas Böcker in 2010

Jonne Valtonen and Roger Wanamo, the arrangers for the Symphonic Fantasies and Symphonic Legends concerts, returned as the lead arrangers for the concert. Additional arrangements were made by Jani Laaksonen and Masashi Hamauzu, and Mikko Laine served as the lyricist for the choral components of the concert. Uematsu was not involved in any aspect of the production, even song selection, as he wanted to be surprised by the result. The style of arrangements followed in the tradition of the shows preceding Symphonic Odysseys, featuring a number of rich, sophisticated suites structured for melodic storytelling. A focus was put on presenting a balanced mix of fan favorites as well as lesser known material that was not commonly performed in orchestra concerts based on video game music. Böcker styled the concert to be a mix of Shades and Fantasies, in that there was a mix of shorter pieces with longer suites. The titles chosen to be featured in the concert were the Final Fantasy series, King's Knight, Chrono Trigger, the SaGa series, The Last Story, Blue Dragon, and Lost Odyssey. Additionally, Uematsu composed an original fanfare to open the concert, which was arranged by Jonne Valtonen.

=== Show ===
The first two concerts were held on July 9, 2011, at 3:00 and 8:00 pm, at the Cologne Philharmonic Hall in Cologne, Germany. Symphonic Odysseys was performed by the WDR Rundfunkorchester Köln and the WDR Radio Choir Cologne, conducted by Arnie Roth. Nobuo Uematsu was in attendance, and Ralph Erdenberger served as the presenter. The concert was also broadcast live online. The concert was divided into two acts separated by an intermission, with the first act focusing on Uematsu's earlier works and the second act made up of material composed in the later parts of his career. The event was initiated by the original opening fanfare composed by Uematsu followed by a nearly nineteen-minute-long piano concerto of Final Fantasy music from the first six titles in the series, presented in 3 movements: "Grave - Allegro", "Adagio Cantabile", and "Allegro Molto". The piano was played by Benyamin Nuss. The placement of the piece was a throwback to Nuss's performance at Symphonic Fantasies, where he also performed a piano concerto at the beginning of the concert. The concerto was the one that Wanamo was most excited about arranging for the concert. It was followed by arrangements of individual pieces from King's Knight, Chrono Trigger, the SaGa series, and Final Fantasy X.

After a brief intermission, the second act was started by arrangements of pieces from The Last Story, Final Fantasy XIV and Blue Dragon. The Blue Dragon piece featured a violin performance by Juraj Čižmarovič, who also performed at the Symphonic Legends concert. They were followed by a suite of music from Lost Odyssey to round out the second half of the concert, which lasted twenty minutes. The concert was extended by two encore performances featuring Benyamin Nuss on piano; the first was an arrangement from Final Fantasy X, and the second a suite of battle music from Final Fantasy VII.

The programme of the performances by the London Symphony Orchestra and the London Symphony Chorus differed only slightly from the first performance in Cologne. Conducted by Eckehard Stier and with guest performer Mischa Cheung, the concerts took place on 18 and 20 June, 2017, at the Philharmonie de Paris in Paris, France and on 20 June at the Barbican Centre in London, United Kingdom.

=== Set List ===
Set list
#	Title	Original game (original pieces if different from title)	Arranger
1.	"Opening Fanfare"		Jonne Valtonen
2.	"Concerto for Piano and Orchestra from Final Fantasy" (Movements: "Grave - Allegro", "Adagio Cantabile", "Allegro Molto")	Final Fantasy I ("Main Theme", "Opening Theme"), Final Fantasy II ("Battle Scene 2", "Battle Scene 3"), Final Fantasy III ("The Boundless Ocean"), Final Fantasy IV ("The Dreadful Fight"), Final Fantasy V ("Clash on the Big Bridge"), Final Fantasy VI ("Opening Theme", "Aria", "The Fierce Battle", "The Unforgiven")	Roger Wanamo
3.	"A Pretty Day Out"	King's Knight	Jonne Valtonen
4.	"Silent Night"	Chrono Trigger	Jonne Valtonen
5.	"Main Theme and Save the World"	The Final Fantasy Legend ("Main Theme"), Final Fantasy Legend II ("Save the World")	Jonne Valtonen
6.	"A Fleeting Dream"	Final Fantasy X	Roger Wanamo
7.	"Spreading Your Wings"	The Last Story	Jani Laaksonen
8.	"On Windy Meadows"	Final Fantasy XIV	Jonne Valtonen
9.	"Waterside"	Blue Dragon	Jonne Valtonen
10.	"Suite from Lost Odyssey"	Lost Odyssey ("Main Theme", "A Formidable Enemy Appears", "A Sad Tolten", "Dark Saint", "Light of Blessing ~ A Letter")	Jonne Valtonen
11. (Encore #1)	"Ending Theme"	Final Fantasy X	Masashi Hamauzu
12. (Encore #2)	"Battle Suite"	Final Fantasy VII ("Let the Battles Begin!", "One-Winged Angel", "Jenova", "Birth of a God")	Roger Wanamo

== Album ==
Symphonic Odysseys

Live album by WDR Rundfunkorchester Köln, WDR Radio Choir Cologne, Benyamin Nuss
- Released: December 28, 2011
- Recorded: July 9, 2011
- Genres: Classical, Video game music
- Length: 1:34:56
- Label: Dog Ear Records
- Producer: Michael Breugst

The concert in Cologne was recorded and released as an album titled Symphonic Odysseys by Dog Ear Records, Nobuo Uematsu's recording label. It was announced to be in production on October 26, 2011, and released on December 28, 2011. The artwork for the album features a cross between a sword and a violin on a white background, in the vein of the Symphonic Fantasies album, which had a cross between a violin and a game controller. The cover art was produced by German design house Schech, who earlier provided the artwork for the European release of Symphonic Fantasies. Accompanying the CD is a booklet which contains photos of the concert and discusses the arrangers and compositions included in each song. The album contains everything played at the concert, with the Final Fantasy suite split into three tracks, and the album is split at the intermission into two CDs. Its fourteen tracks have a duration of 1:34:56. While Dog Ear Records published the album in Japan, the album was released in Europe through the online music retailer MAZ-Sound.

Symphonic Odysseys
#	Track name	Length
Disc 1
1.	"Opening Fanfare"	3:07
2.	"Final Fantasy Concerto ~ For Piano and Orchestra - I. Grave - Allegro"	7:36
3.	"Final Fantasy Concerto ~ For Piano and Orchestra - II. Adagio cantabile"	6:53
4.	"Final Fantasy Concerto ~ For Piano and Orchestra - III. Allegro molto"	4:28
5.	"King's Knight BGM ~Pretty day out~ (from King's Knight)"	5:49
6.	"Light of Silence (from Chrono Trigger)"	5:38
7.	"The Final Fantasy Legend / Final Fantasy Legend 2"	6:02
8.	"A Fleeting Dream (from Final Fantasy X)"	6:01
Disc 2
1.	"Spreading Your Wings (from The Last Story)"	6:07
2.	"On Windy Meadows (from Final Fantasy XIV)"	6:29
3.	"Waterside (from Blue Dragon)"	6:11
4.	"Lost Odyssey Suite"	20:34
5.	"Ending Theme (from Final Fantasy X)"	4:46
6.	"Final Fantasy VII Battle Suite"	5:15

== Reception ==
The Symphonic Odysseys concert received varied reviews, with praise given the performance and choice of source material, and both praise and criticism given to the quality of the arrangements. Audun Sorlie of Original Sound Version stated that it was "the greatest live music event I have ever attended," and said that the standing ovation at the end was "the longest[...] I've been part of". Original Sound Version named the concert as the best of the year for 2011 in their year-end awards. In his review of the album for the site, Jayson Napolitano said that the arrangements for the concert were "top notch", and brought attention to works by the composers which were typically overlooked. Joe Hammond of Square Enix Music Online said that it was "an outstanding concert — possibly the most successful in Europe to date" and added that it was "a tour de force of flawless performances and impeccable orchestrations and arrangements". He felt that several of the pieces surpassed the arrangements played in the Distant Worlds and Symphonic Fantasies concerts, and made special note of the third movement in the Final Fantasy concerto and the Lost Odyssey suite. Polish site GameMusic.net's Mariusz Borkowski, in his review of the album, made particular note of Benyamin Nuss's piano performance during the Final Fantasy concerto and Juraj Čižmarovič's violin performance in the Lost Odyssey suite. He stated that the concert "sets new standards as to how a professional game music event should be organised."

In contrast to the enthusiastic praises of other critics, Kyle Miller of RPGFan felt that many of the pieces were "disorganized and ineptly arranged", and that the arrangements had a lack of enthusiasm. He reserved praise only for the fanfare and the Lost Odyssey suite. Benjamin Schmädig of the German site 4Players.de felt that while some of the arrangements were "excellently arranged", they did "not make a mark in the overall impression", specifically noting "On Windy Meadows", "Main Theme and Save the World", and "Spreading Your Wings" as "spot-on, but conventional fan service", and found that the Lost Odyssey suite was lacking a rousing finale, with a relatively unremarkable choir compared to Valtonen's previous work. He also dismissed the efforts of the concert's moderator as childish. Unlike Miller, however, he felt that the other concert pieces were outstanding, especially the Final Fantasy concerto and "Silent Light". He also praised the concert's use of Uematsu's less-often arranged pieces and concluded his review with the verdict of a "fantastic, sometimes even magnificent evening of games".

The album release received similar reviews to the original concert. Napolitano, in addition to reiterating some of Sorlie's praises from the original concert about the quality of the arrangements, praised the production values of the album, noting the "crisp, clean sound" as similar to the listening experience of being at the concert and superior to that of the live stream of the concert and that the applause between pieces had been edited out. Hammond called it a "phenomenal album release", stating that it would appeal to both classical music fans and video game music fans. Neither Miller nor Borkowski made note of the differences between the concert and the album, and Schmädig did not review the album.
