= Katharina Treutler =

German pianist

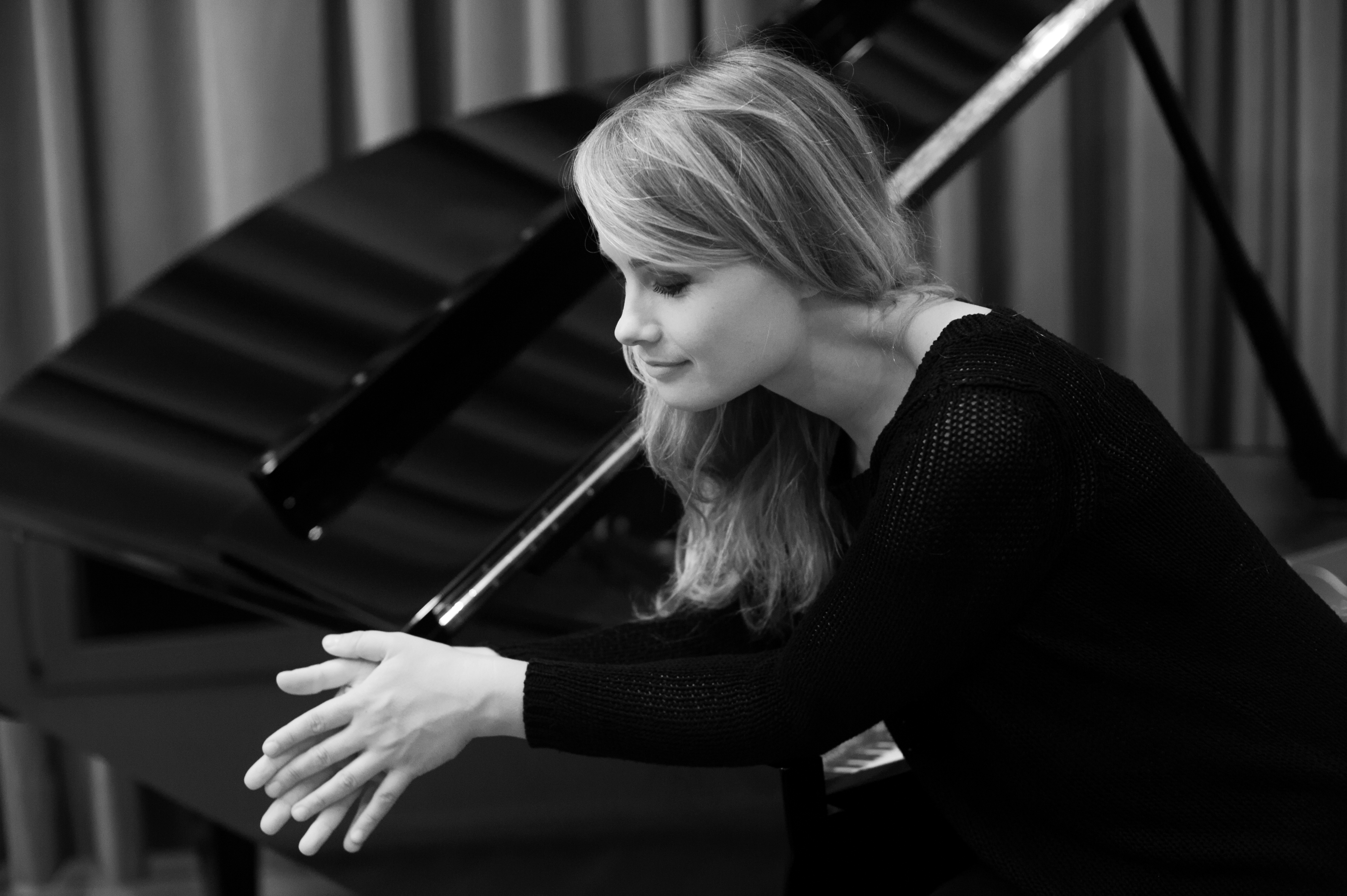
Katharina Treutler

Katharina Treutler (born 1985 in Erfurt) is a German pianist.

== Early life and education ==
Katharina Treutler was born in Erfurt. She studied in Hanover, Tokyo, Paris, Madrid, and Freiburg. Her professors were Bernd Goetzke, Jacques Rouvier, Dmitri Bashkirov and Eric le Sage.

== Career ==
Treutler performs in Europe, Asia and the US - solo and with orchestras such as the London Symphony Orchestra, the San Francisco Symphony Orchestra the Royal Stockholm Philharmonic Orchestra and the Tokyo Philharmonic Orchestra. She has performed at the Concertgebouw Amsterdam, the Bunka Kaikan Hall Tokyo and the Davies Symphony Hall San Francisco.

Since 2016, she has been teaching at the University of Music and Theatre Leipzig.

== Awards and honours ==
She has won several international prizes, including joint third prize at the 2013 Campillos International Piano Competition.

== Recordings ==
- 2010: Brahms Piano concerto no. 1 with the German Pediatrician’s Orchestra
- 2015: Final Symphony with the London Symphony Orchestra

== Publications ==
- 2013: Journal Frontiers in Human Neuroscience: "The influence of chronotype on making music: circadian fluctuations in pianists’ fine motor skills"
