= Merregnon =

Series of albums and concerts

- Created by: Thomas Böcker
- Original work: Merregnon Volume 1 (2000)
- Years: 1999–present

Miscellaneous
- Works: Merregnon Volume 1 (2000); Merregnon Volume 2 (2004); Merregnon: Land of Silence (2021); Merregnon: Heart of Ice (2024)

Official website
- https://www.merregnon.com

Merregnon is a narrative orchestral music series created and produced by Thomas Böcker through his company, Merregnon Studios. Launched in 1999 as an album project featuring music by composers known for their work in video games, the series has since developed into symphonic concert works for children and families.

Early contributors included Chris Hülsbeck and Yuzo Koshiro. The first concert work in the series was Merregnon: Land of Silence, composed by Yoko Shimomura, followed by Merregnon: Heart of Ice, composed by Nobuo Uematsu. Both works have been performed internationally, with Merregnon: Heart of Ice recorded with the London Symphony Orchestra and released in 2026 by Decca Classics.

== Merregnon: Heart of Ice ==
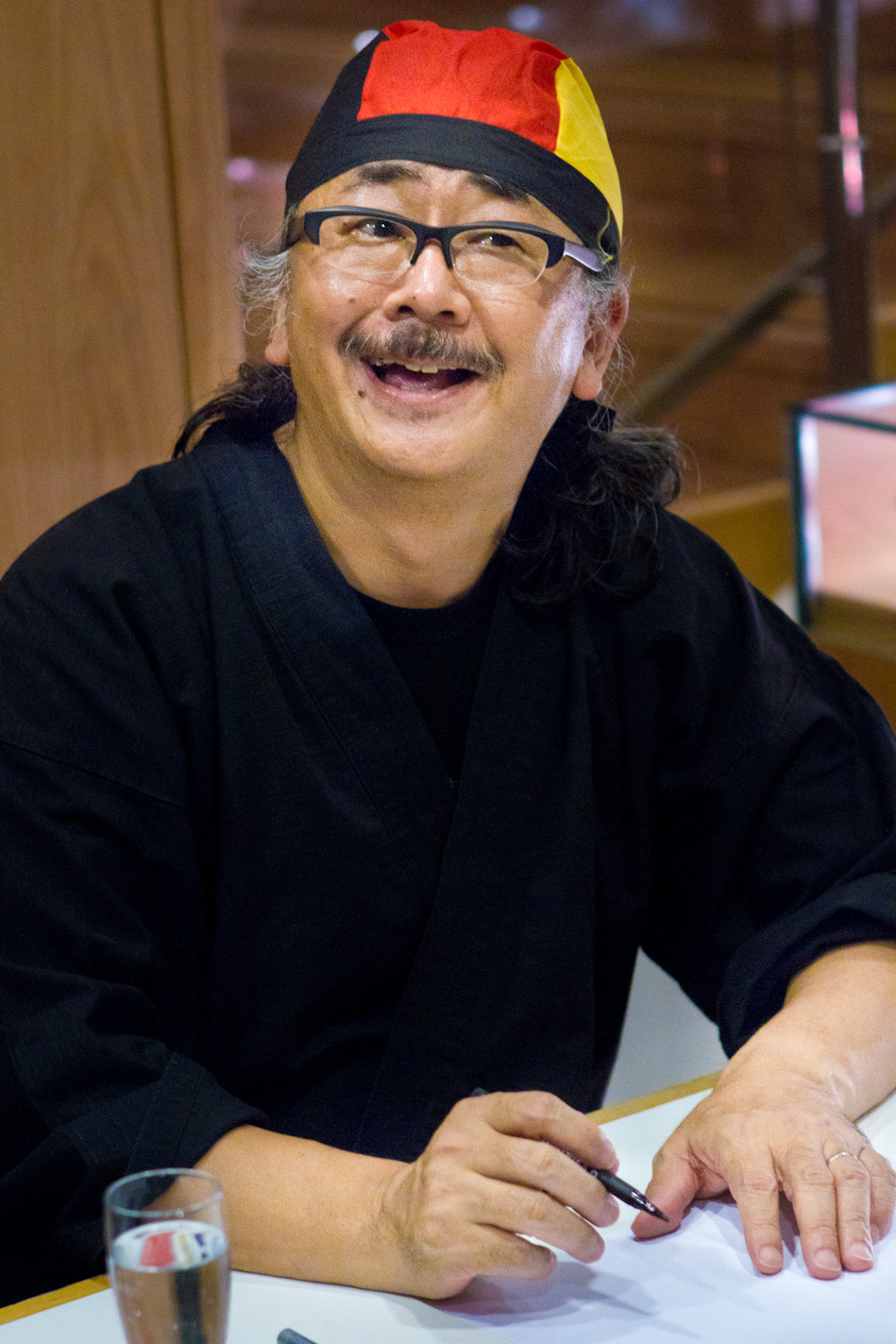
Nobuo Uematsu, composer of Merregnon: Heart of Ice

Merregnon: Heart of Ice is an original symphonic fairy tale with music by Nobuo Uematsu and a story by German children’s author Frauke Angel. Conceived as a work for narrator and orchestra, it is Uematsu’s first orchestral composition written specifically for the concert hall. In an interview with Die Zeit, he said that he wanted to devote his remaining creative time to projects he personally cared about, including Merregnon: Heart of Ice, and that his aim was “to write music that makes children happy.” In a later conversation with Jon Batiste, Uematsu described the orchestra as “the most luxurious rock band” and said that he hoped children would experience the sound of a live orchestra for themselves.

The work premiered on 29 February 2024 in Ludwigshafen, Germany, performed by the Deutsche Staatsphilharmonie Rheinland-Pfalz under conductor Eckehard Stier, with orchestration by Andrew Cottee. A studio version was later recorded at Abbey Road Studios with the London Symphony Orchestra, featuring English narration by Alicia Vikander for the international release and Japanese narration by Rie Tozuka for the Japanese edition. The album was released worldwide by Decca Classics on 19 June 2026. It debuted at number four on the UK Official Classical Albums Chart. Upon release, it was named Album of the Week by Classic FM.

The work received its first performance outside Germany on 25 June 2026 at the Philharmonie de Paris, performed by the Orchestre national d’Île-de-France. A performance in Japan is scheduled for 17 April 2027 at Tokyo Opera City, featuring the Tokyo Philharmonic Orchestra.

On 24 October 2026, the Japanese television programme Daimei no Nai Ongakukai aired an episode dedicated to Merregnon: Heart of Ice. The programme featured Nobuo Uematsu discussing the work, alongside performances of six excerpts by the Tokyo Philharmonic Orchestra, with narration by Rie Tozuka.

=== Story ===
The story is set in the frozen world of Merregnon, where the inhabitants live underground in fear of Goyakai, the Ice Wind Dancer. Accompanied by the dog Beru, the cheerful wooden robot Kjugo sets out in search of his missing creator, the inventor Nuobi. Their journey culminates in a confrontation with Goyakai as Kjugo attempts to break her hold over the land and restore warmth to Merregnon.

=== Background and development ===
Nobuo Uematsu and Thomas Böcker had known each other for more than twenty years before collaborating on Merregnon: Heart of Ice. According to Uematsu, when Böcker first approached him about the project around the year 2019, the composer was initially unable to participate because of other commitments. After later receiving the story material and character illustrations, Uematsu agreed to compose the work, saying that he connected with Böcker’s vision of creating an orchestral work for children.

Böcker provided Uematsu with detailed scenarios and suggested particular instrumental associations and colours for different parts of the story. Uematsu composed the score, giving each of its four central characters a distinct theme. In an interview, he described the story as easy to understand and relate to, and said that he focused on melodies that were easy to follow. He later explained that writing music for children required particular care because much of the work tells its story through melody and its principal themes therefore had to remain clearly defined. Uematsu also said that he hoped Merregnon: Heart of Ice would become a child’s first encounter with an orchestra.

=== Reception ===
Reviewing the premiere, Ulrike Dansauer of Die Rheinpfalz wrote that the music and narration complemented each other, with the score heightening the emotional impact of individual scenes. She also observed that even the youngest children listened attentively, while adults appeared absorbed in the story. Thomas Nickel of M! Games similarly commented on its appeal across generations. He compared its musical language to Uematsu's early Final Fantasy scores, describing it as fresh and original, and wrote that the compositions could convey drama and character without depending on graphics or gameplay.

Writing about the album, Anton Spice of The Blank Mag described its "melodic simplicity and luscious harmony" and wrote that it combined Western orchestral traditions with Uematsu's Japanese heritage. AllMusic rated the album four and a half out of five stars. Reviewer Islem Meghiref described Uematsu's melodies as memorable and integrated into a larger musical structure, and wrote that the frequent narration occasionally interrupted the musical flow.

The Japanese classical music magazine Ongaku no Tomo discussed the work's allegorical and mythic qualities, suggesting that it could leave a lasting formative impression on children who encountered it at an early age. It also described the lyrical melodies and motifs as characteristic of Uematsu's compositional style.

== Merregnon: Land of Silence ==
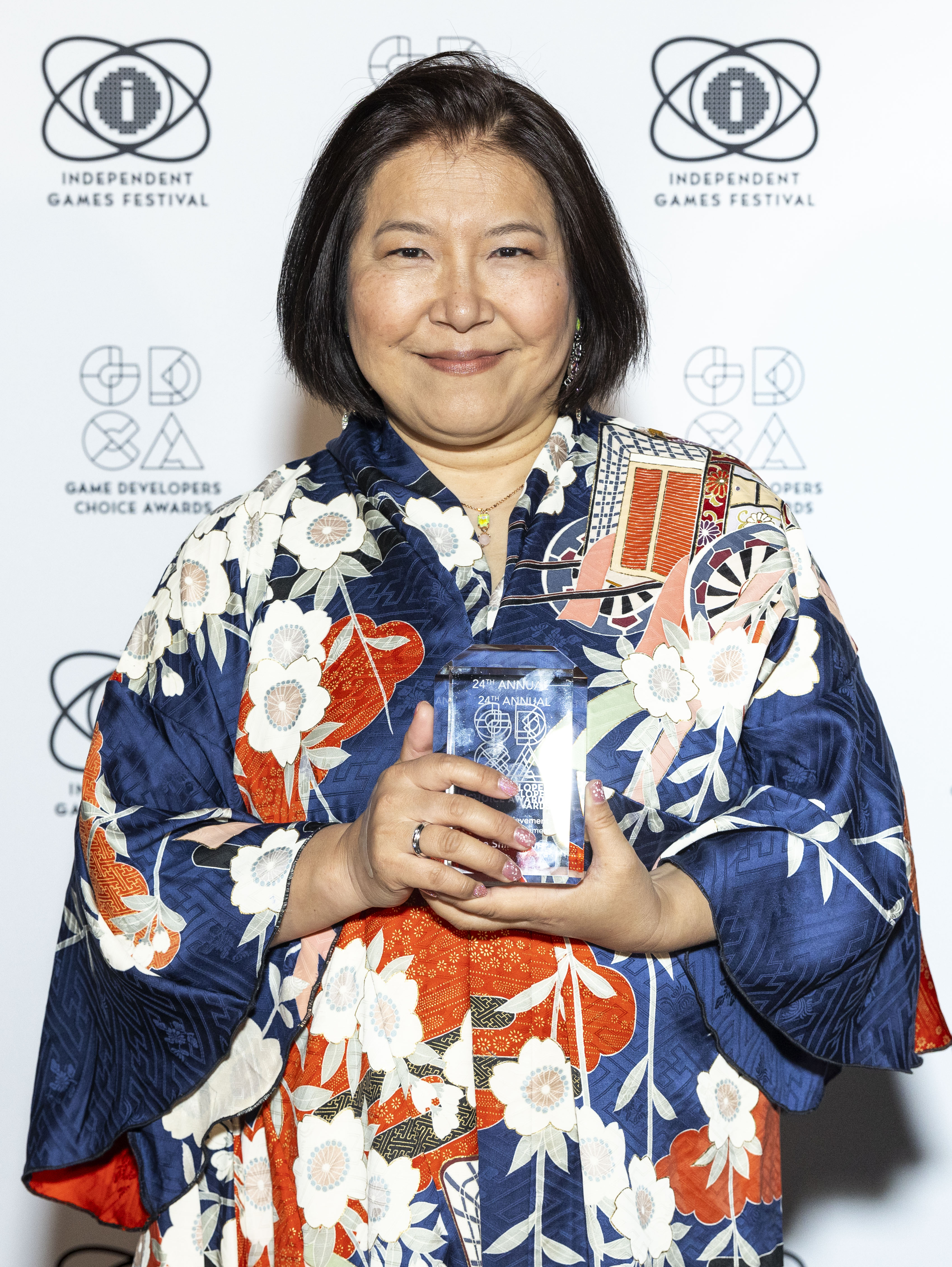
Yoko Shimomura, composer for Merregnon: Land of Silence

Merregnon: Land of Silence features original music by Yoko Shimomura and a story by children's author Frauke Angel. This project marks Shimomura's first concert work. It was first performed by the Royal Stockholm Philharmonic Orchestra, conducted by Andreas Hanson, and filmed at the Stockholm Concert Hall in June 2021. The video was made freely available on the orchestra's website, premiering on September 10, 2021.

Since 2022, Merregnon: Land of Silence has been performed by orchestras worldwide.

=== Story ===
In the grey landscape of Merregnon live Miru and her dog Mako. One day they discover a wounded bird named Ikari, who sings of a colourful region far to the north. Together with her friend Hikito and the bird Ikari, they embark on a journey. They encounter the warrior Skissor, who has imprisoned the dragon Yamakito at a massive wall separating the vibrant north from the bleak south. Forced by Skissor to guard this region, Yamakito preserves the only remaining beauty in Merregnon. With Ikari’s help, the group frees the dragon, whose song defeats Skissor, causing the wall to crumble.

=== Reception ===
Merregnon: Land of Silence was described by the Frankfurter Allgemeine Zeitung as a “symphonic anime”. Klassik Radio referred to the concert as a “symphonic anime fairy tale for the whole family” that introduces children to the world of orchestral music in a playful way. A Deutschlandfunk report highlighted the collaboration with a video game composer in the context of music education.

For Gramophone magazine, Böcker wrote a guest article on the importance of family concerts, emphasizing the value of an entertaining and engaging approach to orchestral music. Wired called Merregnon: Land of Silence “a welcome hand for struggling concert halls.” In a webinar hosted by the German Embassy in Tokyo, Yoko Shimomura, Frauke Angel, and Thomas Böcker spoke about the creation of the project.

== Performances ==
=== Merregnon: Heart of Ice ===
| Date | City | Country | Venue | Orchestra | Concerts |
|---|---|---|---|---|---|
| February 29, 2024 | Ludwigshafen | Germany | Feierabendhaus Ludwigshafen | Staatsphilharmonie Rheinland-Pfalz | World premiere |
| March 1, 2024 | Ludwigshafen | Germany | Feierabendhaus Ludwigshafen | Staatsphilharmonie Rheinland-Pfalz | 1 |
| December 11, 2025 | Neustadt/Weinstraße | Germany | Saalbau Neustadt/Weinstraße | Staatsphilharmonie Rheinland-Pfalz | 1 |
| December 14-15, 2025 | Ludwigshafen | Germany | Feierabendhaus Ludwigshafen | Staatsphilharmonie Rheinland-Pfalz | 2 |
| June 25, 2026 | Paris | France | Philharmonie de Paris | Orchestre national d'Île-de-France | 1 |
| April 17, 2027 | Tokyo | Japan | Tokyo Opera City | Tokyo Philharmonic Orchestra | 1 |

=== Merregnon: Land of Silence ===
| Date | City | Country | Venue | Orchestra | Concerts |
|---|---|---|---|---|---|
| September 10, 2021 | Stockholm | Sweden | Stockholm Concert Hall | Royal Stockholm Philharmonic Orchestra | Video premiere |
| September 17, 2022 | Recklinghausen | Germany | Ruhrfestspielhaus Recklinghausen | Neue Philharmonie Westfalen | 1 |
| September 25, 2022 | Gelsenkirchen | Germany | Musiktheater im Revier Gelsenkirchen | Neue Philharmonie Westfalen | 1 |
| November 22-23, 2022 | Lausanne | Switzerland | Salle Métropole Lausanne | Orchestre de Chambre de Lausanne | 3 |
| March 5, 2023 | Jena | Germany | Volkshaus Jena | Jenaer Philharmonie | 1 |
| March 7-11, 2023 | Stockholm | Sweden | Stockholm Concert Hall | Royal Stockholm Philharmonic Orchestra | 13 |
| March 17-18, 2023 | Hong Kong | China | Tuen Mun Town Hall Hong Kong | Hong Kong Philharmonic Orchestra | 2 |
| April 20-23, 2023 | Ludwigshafen | Germany | Feierabendhaus Ludwigshafen | Staatsphilharmonie Rheinland-Pfalz | 4 |
| June 1, 2023 | Shanghai | China | Symphony Hall Shanghai | Shanghai Symphony Orchestra | 2 |
| July 1, 2023 | Chautauqua, New York | United States | Amphitheater, Chautauqua, N. Y. | Chautauqua Symphony Orchestra | 1 |
| April 23, 2024 | Eindhoven | Netherlands | Muziekgebouw Eindhoven | South Netherlands Philharmonic | 1 |
| April 24, 2024 | Tilburg | Netherlands | Concertzaal Tilburg | South Netherlands Philharmonic | 1 |
| April 25, 2024 | Venlo | Netherlands | De Maaspoort Theater Venlo | South Netherlands Philharmonic | 1 |
| April 26, 2024 | Kerkrade | Netherlands | Theater Kerkrade | South Netherlands Philharmonic | 1 |
| March 18, 2027 | Turku | Finland | Music Centre Fuuga | Turku Philharmonic Orchestra | 1 |

== Early productions: Merregnon Volumes 1 and 2 ==
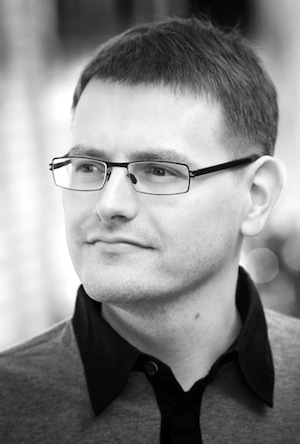
Producer and artistic director Thomas Böcker

In 1999, Thomas Böcker initiated Merregnon as producer by inviting video game composers from several countries to contribute original music to a fantasy album. The concept combined music with a story presented in an accompanying booklet. Merregnon, Volume 1 was released in 2000 and featured contributions from composers including Chris Hülsbeck, Allister Brimble, Jonne Valtonen and Fabian Del Priore.

Whereas the first volume had been produced electronically, Merregnon, Volume 2 was orchestrated and recorded with musicians in Prague and New York under conductor Andy Brick. A suite based on music from the album was performed at the first Game Concert in Leipzig in 2003, before the full album was released in 2004. A Japanese edition followed in January 2005 through Dex Entertainment.

Fabian Del Priore served as the principal composer for both volumes and developed their central musical themes. 4Players devoted a multi-part feature to the second album, including interviews with Böcker and several participating composers. Böcker's work on the two albums led to the development of the Game Concerts series.

== Composers ==
Composers who contributed to the first two Merregnon albums include:

- Andy Brick
- Allister Brimble
- Jason Chong
- Fabian Del Priore
- Gustaf Grefberg
- Olof Gustafsson
- Markus Holler
- Chris Hülsbeck
- Yuzo Koshiro
- Jogeir Liljedahl
- Rudolf Stember
- Jonne Valtonen

Later entries in the series were composed by Yoko Shimomura (Land of Silence) and Nobuo Uematsu (Heart of Ice).
