= Symphonic Fantasies =

Concert tour of music of Square Enix video games

Symphonic Fantasies: Music from Square Enix
- Orchestral concert tour by Merregnon Studios
- Conductor: Arnie Roth
- Composers: Jonne Valtonen, Nobuo Uematsu, Hiroki Kikuta, Yoko Shimomura, Yasunori Mitsuda
- Arrangers: Jonne Valtonen, Roger Wanamo
- Venue: Cologne (Germany), Cologne Philharmonic Hall
- Album recordings: Symphonic Fantasies (2010); Symphonic Fantasies Tokyo (2012)
- Start date: September 11, 2009
- End date: October 6, 2016
- Supporting acts: Benyamin Nuss, Rony Barrak
- Producer: Thomas Böcker (Merregnon Studios)

Merregnon Studios concert chronology
- Symphonic Shades (August 23, 2008); Symphonic Fantasies (2009, 2012, 2016); Symphonic Legends (September 23, 2010)

Symphonic Fantasies: Music from Square Enix was an award-winning symphonic tribute concert originally held in Cologne, Germany on September 12, 2009, at the Cologne Philharmonic Hall featuring video game music from Japanese game developer Square Enix. The concert featured symphonic movements based on the Kingdom Hearts series, Secret of Mana, the Chrono series, and the Final Fantasy series. It was produced and directed by Thomas Böcker, with arrangements provided by Finnish composer and musician Jonne Valtonen with assistance by Roger Wanamo. Due to overwhelming demand, a second concert was added at the König-Pilsener-Arena in Oberhausen, on September 11, 2009. Both performances were by the WDR Radio Orchestra Cologne and the WDR Radio Choir Cologne under conduction from Arnie Roth, with guest performers Rony Barrak and Benyamin Nuss joining the orchestra. Symphonic Fantasies was broadcast over radio on the WDR4 station and streamed live video online.

In 2012, five new performances were scheduled, taking stage in Tokyo, Stockholm, and a reprise in Cologne. These performances featured slightly modified versions of the original arrangements, and like the original concerts, were sold out. Another performance was held in London in October 2016 by the London Symphony Orchestra. The original concert and the Tokyo concert both sparked the release of an album. These albums, along with the concerts themselves, were heavily praised, both for the quality of the performance and for the quality of Valtonen's arrangements, which overlaid themes from multiple pieces rather than relying on a traditional medley.

== Concerts ==
=== Production ===
Thomas Böcker and then WDR Symphony Orchestra Cologne director Winfried Fechner began collaborating on orchestrated video game concerts in 2007, after Fechner had attended the Fifth Symphonic Game Music Concert held in Leipzig. As their ideas and plans materialized, three projects were set in motion to determine the interest of a younger audience in classical music performance and the aptitude of the WDR orchestra in focusing on a new source of compositions. The first project was PROMS: That's Sound, That's Rhythm, held in early 2008, featuring a mixture of classical works and video game music, ranging from works by Ralph Vaughan Williams and Morton Gould as well as arrangements of music from video games such as Shenmue and Castlevania previously featured in the Symphonic Game Music Concerts. The second project, held in August 2008, was a composer specific concert titled Symphonic Shades - Hülsbeck in Concert, focusing entirely on the works of German video game composer Chris Hülsbeck. After the concert, Fechner revealed in an interview the existence of the third project, saying that he and Böcker would be involved in another concert of video game music the following September. The third project was to be a concert of music from one game company, focusing on multiple titles released by the same developer. This company was later confirmed to be Square Enix when Fechner announced Symphonic Fantasies as a video game music concert to take place on September 12, 2009. A website was set up for announcements, interviews and other concert information.

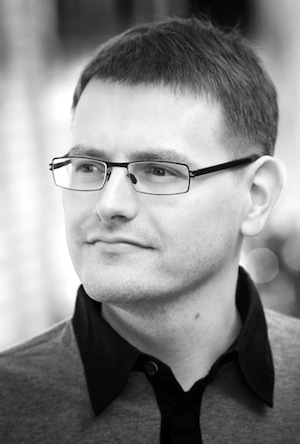
Producer Thomas Böcker in 2010

Böcker later explained that the decision to focus on Square Enix was made due to the large library of games to choose from, all of which he felt had a distinct sound, and many of which were very well known in Germany. An emphasis was put on balancing out the concert program and the arrangements, so that the music would appeal to first-time listeners, classical music fans, and longtime gamers. The titles chosen to be featured in the concert were Kingdom Hearts and Kingdom Hearts II from the Kingdom Hearts series, Secret of Mana, Chrono Trigger and Chrono Cross from the Chrono series, and the Final Fantasy series. In order to select the pieces presented, the original composers were consulted to assemble a list of their personal favorites. The composers were Yoko Shimomura for the music of Kingdom Hearts, Hiroki Kikuta for the music of Secret of Mana, Yasunori Mitsuda for the music of Chrono Trigger and Cross, and Nobuo Uematsu for the music of the Final Fantasy series.

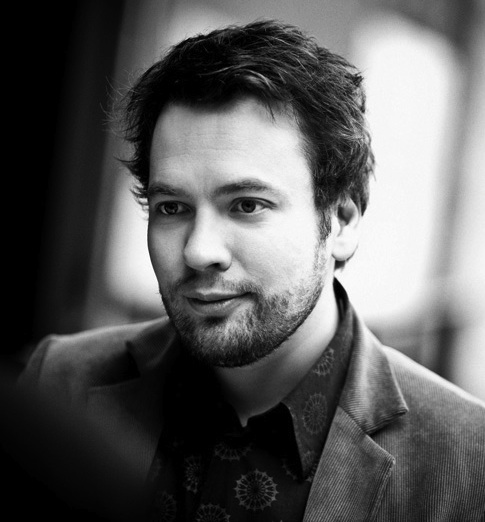
Arranger Jonne Valtonen in 2010

For the concert, Jonne Valtonen returned as the lead arranger; he had previously been the arranger for video game music concerts since 2005, including Symphonic Shades. He was given complete freedom to arrange the music based on the general outline given to him by Böcker. Valtonen spent six months on the arrangements, during which Valtonen studied each song and referred to the composer's original intended expression. No Japanese guest arrangers were used for this concert in order to maintain a unique European take on the source material, but Valtonen brought in former classmate and close friend Roger Wanamo to assist on the arrangement of the music from the Chrono games. This was Wanamo's first time arranging video game music. On March 9, 2009, it was also announced that Valtonen had additionally been commissioned to compose an original fanfare to be played at the start of the concert, and with a video preview of his composition was released.

The arrangements in the concert were structured as suites, dubbed "Fantasies", with multiple songs from each game series positioned and arranged together to tell melodic stories rather than using the conventional medley structure more commonly heard in video game music arrangements. The fanfare, titled Fanfare Overture, was done in a style of traditional fanfares with some accentuated textures in order to introduce all the elements of the orchestra. The Kingdom Hearts suite featured seven songs from the two titles, and was arranged as a romantic piano concerto. Secret of Mana featured six songs featured in the original game. The arrangement made use of notable unique techniques in order to replicate the atmosphere found in the original game; for example, the choir was used to create "sound effects" such as floor vibration by foot stomping and simulating distant rain with their voices. The Chrono suite featured ten songs from Chrono Trigger and Chrono Cross. The suite featured a "crossing" of melodies, in which multiple melodies would be layered on top of one another, resulting in different well-known themes performed simultaneously in harmony. The Final Fantasy suite contained eight songs from the first seven titles in the series. Unlike the other suites, it featured a simpler structure, focusing more on each individual theme rather than overlapping multiple pieces. This was due to a request by Uematsu that the arrangement remain similar to those of prior Final Fantasy concerts.

=== Original performance ===
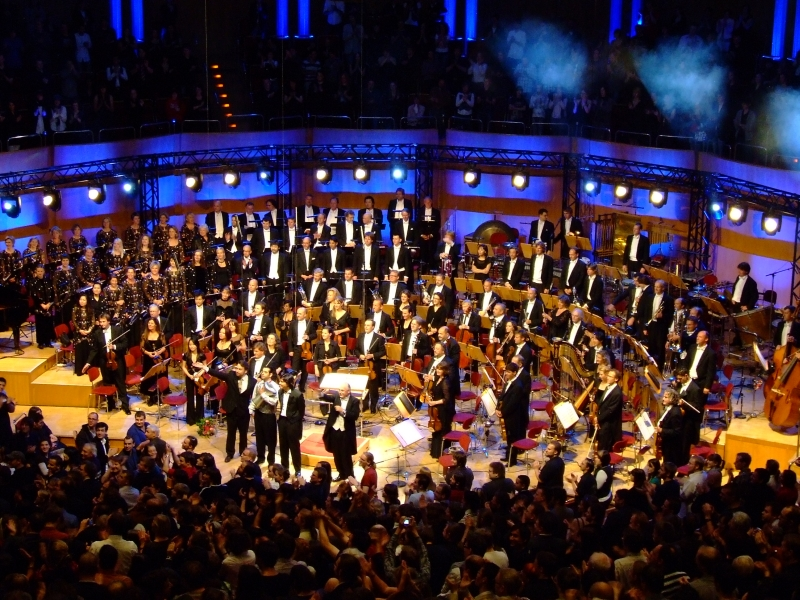
Symphonic Fantasies performers at the end of the September 12, 2009 concert

The orchestra received about two weeks of rehearsal time prior to their performances, more than any other game concert before. The concert was originally scheduled to be performed on September 12, 2009 in the Cologne Philharmonic Hall in Cologne, but once the tickets were sold out, a second performance was added for September 11, 2009 at the König Pilsener Arena in Oberhausen. Ticket sales for the initial concert began on January 17, and half of them were sold within a week, with the remainder sold by April 2, 2009. The concert was preceded by a Meet and Greet session that included the original composers as well as the arrangement team and guest artists for the show. The concerts were performed by the WDR Symphony Orchestra Cologne and WDR Radio Choir Cologne, conducted by Arnie Roth.

Kingdom Hearts suite sample
Sample of the introduction of the Kingdom Hearts suite, featuring Benyamin Nuss on the piano.

Before each suite, the moderator would introduce the upcoming musical piece, as well as introduce the composer in attendance. Each "Fantasy" lasted for more than 15 minutes each. The Kingdom Hearts suite featured solo pianist Benyamin Nuss. For the Chrono suite, Rony Barrak joined the orchestra and performed on his signature darbuka. A surprise encore was performed after the final suite, which took the form of a medley of the final boss themes from each game. Rony Barrak returned on stage as a soloist for the encore. No video screens or other form of tools were used during the concert, with only minimal lighting effects at certain parts for atmosphere being employed. The event was broadcast live on the WDR4 radio station, as well as through an online video stream, enabling a worldwide audience to watch the concert. It was the first fully live-streamed video game concert.

=== Later performances ===
Three years after the original performance, on September 14, 2011, during the Tokyo Game Show, Square Enix Japan announced on their website that the Symphonic Fantasies concert would be performed in Tokyo on January 7 and 8, 2012. They also announced that Benyamin Nuss, Rony Barrak, Jonne Valtonen, Roger Wanamo and Thomas Böcker would be in attendance. Böcker returned to produce the event, and Nuss and Barrak returned as soloists.

The concerts were held at the Tokyo Bunka Kaikan Main Hall, and were performed by the Tokyo Philharmonic Orchestra and the Tokyo Philharmonic Chorus. The concerts were conducted by Eckehard Stier. In addition to the originally announced attendees, in attendance were guest of honors Hiroki Kikuta, Yoko Shimomura, and Yasunori Mitsuda, as well as guests such as video game composers Takenobu Mitsuyoshi, Yuzo Koshiro, Masashi Hamauzu, and Mahito Yokota. The concerts were featured extensively in the February issue of Famitsu as well as on their official website. Symphonic Fantasies Tokyo was the first all-European video game concert production to take place in Japan. More than 4600 fans were in attendance, and the concerts sold out within days. The arrangements and tempo were slightly modified from the original concert, and the encore was changed by Wanamo to add elements from an additional Final Fantasy song.

At the conclusion of the Symphonic Odysseys concert in Cologne by Merregnon Studios on July 9, 2011, the WDR announced that Symphonic Fantasies would return to Germany in 2012. The concerts were held on July 6 and 7, 2012 at the Cologne Philharmonic Hall. The concert was again performed by the WDR Radio Orchestra Cologne and WDR Radio Choir Cologne, conducted by Niklas Wíllen. On March 26, 2012, Merregnon Studios announced that Symphonic Fantasies would also be performed at the Stockholm Concert Hall on June 9, 2012. The concert was performed by Royal Stockholm Philharmonic Orchestra and Katarina Choir, conducted by Andreas Hanson. Like the other concerts, the 2012 European concerts were sold out. Four years later, on October 6, 2016, the Symphonic Fantasies concert was performed in London at the Barbican Centre by the London Symphony Orchestra and London Symphony Chorus. Selections from the concert, along with ones from Final Symphony and Final Symphony II, were performed at Symphonic Memories concerts on June 9, 2018 in Stockholm, March 14, 2019 in Oulu, Finland, June 6, 2019 in St. Gallen, Switzerland, December 1, 2019 in Kawasaki, Japan, and April 7, 2023 in Lyon, France. The Kawasaki concert was released as an album by Square Enix as Symphonic Memories - music from Square Enix the following year.

=== Set list ===
Set list
#	Suite	Original pieces
1.	"Fanfare Overture"	
2.	"Fantasy I: Kingdom Hearts"	"Dearly Beloved", "Sora", "Hand in Hand", "Kairi", "The Other Promise", "Happy Holidays!", and "A Fight to the Death"
3.	"Fantasy II: Secret of Mana"	"Fear of the Heavens", "Into the Thick of it", "Eternal Recurrence", "Prophecy", "The Oracle", and "Phantom and... A Rose..."
4.	"Fantasy III: Chrono Trigger/Chrono Cross"	"A Premonition", "Scars of Time", "Chrono Trigger", "Battle with Magus", "Peaceful Days", "Gale", "Brink of Death", "Prisoners of Fate", "Outskirts of Time", and "Frog's Theme"
5.	"Fantasy IV: Final Fantasy"	"Prelude", "Fighting", "One-Winged Angel", "Swing de Chocobo", "Phantom Forest", "Battle at the Big Bridge", "Final Fantasy", and "Bombing Mission"
6.	"Encore"	"Destati", "Meridian Dance", "Lavos's Theme", and "One-Winged Angel" (and "Dancing Mad" in 2012 concerts)

== Albums ==
Symphonic Fantasies

Live album by WDR Radio Orchestra Cologne, WDR Radio Choir Cologne, Rony Barrak, Benyamin Nuss
- Released: September 17, 2010
- Recorded: September 12, 2009
- Genre: Classical, Video game music
- Length: 1:12:30
- Label: Decca (Universal Music)
- Producer: Thomas Böcker

The September 12, 2009 concert in Cologne was recorded and released as an album titled Symphonic Fantasies. It was announced to be in production on April 15, 2010, and made available for pre-order. In an interview, Fechner stated the album was being mixed and edited at a "prestigious European studio". This was later revealed to be Abbey Road Studios in London. The album was first released in Japan on September 15, 2010, published by Square Enix Japan's own label under the auspices of Sony Music Distribution. The album was released in Europe on September 17, 2010, published by Decca Records. Both album versions feature identical track listings and production, with the only differences being the artwork and provided booklet. The artwork for the European album was designed by the German design house, schech, and features a cross between a violin and a game controller, while the Japanese cover has an image of a white book. Böcker produced the European album, and was a consultant for the production of the Japanese release.

The album does not contain the encore suite, which was released as a single on iTunes on December 14, 2010. The album's five tracks have a duration of 1:12:30, with the encore track bringing it to 1:20:56. Upon release, it reach position #13 on the German classical Media Control Charts for sales in September 2010. The Japanese release reached position #102 on the Oricon charts and stayed on the charts for one week. After the concert in Tokyo, a second album was released. Titled Symphonic Fantasies Tokyo, the two-disc album is a recording of that performance, including the encore. The album, produced by Merregnon Studios and mixed by a team of sound engineers from Japan and Germany, was released on June 11, 2012. Its cover is a modified version of the original European album with a large red circle, and it includes a twenty-page booklet with comments from the original composers. The album's six tracks have a length of 1:20:50. A new printing of the Symphonic Fantasies Tokyo album on two CDs or three vinyl records, as well as a double album combination with the Final Symphony concert album (2015) was released by Laced Records in December 2016. The Symphonic Fantasies Tokyo album was re-released as a lossless digital album on Bandcamp for streaming and download on January 1, 2021.

Symphonic Fantasies
#	Track name	Performer	Arranger	Composer	Length (Tokyo album)
1.	"Fanfare Overture"	WDR Symphony Orchestra	Jonne Valtonen	Jonne Valtonen	3:12 (3:09)
2.	"Fantasy I: Kingdom Hearts"	WDR Symphony Orchestra; Benyamin Nuss	Jonne Valtonen	Yoko Shimomura	15:28 (15:53)
3.	"Fantasy II: Secret of Mana"	WDR Symphony Orchestra; WDR Radio Choir	Jonne Valtonen	Hiroki Kikuta	17:42 (18:54)
4.	"Fantasy III: Chrono Trigger/Chrono Cross"	WDR Symphony Orchestra; Rony Barrak	Jonne Valtonen; Roger Wanamo	Yasunori Mitsuda	17:39 (16:36)
5.	"Fantasy IV: Final Fantasy"	WDR Symphony Orchestra; WDR Radio Choir	Jonne Valtonen	Nobuo Uematsu	18:29 (18:37)
6.	"Encore: Final Boss Suite"	WDR Symphony Orchestra; WDR Radio Choir; Rony Barrak	Jonne Valtonen	Yoko Shimomura, Hiroki Kikuta, Yasunori Mitsuda, and Nobuo Uematsu	8:26 (7:41)

== Reception ==
The initial event received widespread critical acclaim, with much praise given to the focused presentation, deeply developed arrangements and evolution of the concept. Audun Sorlie of Original Sound Version stated that the concert "exceeded all expectations" and further added that the event was "absolutely amazing". Chris Greening of Square Enix Music Online concluded in his report that "Symphonic Fantasies ranks among the greatest musical and social experiences of my life. Each arrangement took listeners on an extended journey through the atmospheres, emotions, and melodies of their respective series." Polish site GameMusic.net's Kamil Rojek said in his report that "Symphonic Fantasies is a significant turning point in the history of video game music concerts. It was a remarkable event that made great progress in breaking the boundaries between game music and traditional classical works."

The composers themselves expressed great regard for the concert and the arrangement. Yoko Shimomura noted she was extremely pleased with Valtonen's arrangement of Kingdom Hearts, feeling it "very colorful and beautiful, just superb really". Hiroki Kikuta stated that Valtonen's arrangement "defied the framework of regular orchestra and was a very experimental attempt," resulting in "free and unbound expression". Yasunori Mitsuda expressed that he was "really amazed by its fantastic quality", and Nobuo Uematsu said that it was "an exceptionally well-produced concert compared to most game concerts." Uematsu was very taken with the unique arrangements of the other sections of the concert, especially the Mana portion, that he asked Böcker to take more liberties with the source material if the opportunity arose in the future; this led to the creation of the Final Symphony concert in 2013. The composers also voiced their desire to bring the concert to Japan.

The Symphonic Fantasies album garnered universal praise upon its release. Patrick Gann of RPGFan said that it was "the best game music arranged album of 2010. It may be the best in years, with the only things rivaling it being other recordings from the WDR." Audun Sorlie of Original Sound Version called it "the best symphonic game arrangement CD you can get your hands on," and further added "for every game music fan out there, especially the ones with a taste for Square Enix, this is the definitive pick for you." Chris Greening of Square Enix Music Online gave the album the score of 10 out of 10, and stated that it "offers a definitive tribute to Square Enix" and "certainly deserves a perfect score and an unconditional recommendation." Benjamin Schmädig of the German site 4players.de said of the album "Symphonic Fantasies represents memories of great emotional moments. The orchestra and choir put in all their strength, all their subtlety in these moments." He further complimented Jonne Valtonen, saying that he "knows exactly how to arrange the known motifs in such an imaginative way that they tell the familiar stories from scratch." Denis Brown of the German site OnlineWelten said that for Square Enix fans, it is an obligatory purchase.

Symphonic Fantasies Tokyo was also praised upon release. Jayson Napolitano of Destructoid said that the "arrangements are brilliant and are some of the best in the business," and that the addition of the encore was an improvement over the physical version of the original album, though he felt that the sound quality "lacks some of the dynamics of the original release" in the bass regions. Joe Hammond of Square Enix Music Online found the opposite difference in the sound quality, finding that the deep drum sounds had more impact than in the first album. Stephen Meyerink of RPGFan felt that "the production and mastering on the album is stellar", and was pleased by the modifications to the arrangements between the original concert and the Tokyo concert, especially the slight increase in tempo. Audun Sorlie of Original Sound Version also praised the changes, not only in the tempo but also in the arrangements, noting the more integrated piano in the Kingdom Hearts suite and the more impressive brass section in the opening fanfare. He also noted that, unlike the original performance and album, the recording of live audience did not include any laughter when the chocobo theme interrupted "One Winged Angel" in the Final Fantasy suite. He concluded that the album was worth purchasing even for owners of the first album.
