= Symphonic Legends – Music from Nintendo =

2010 symphonic concert of Nintendo video game music

- Orchestra: WDR Rundfunkorchester Köln
- Choir: State Choir Latvija
- Conductor: Niklas Willén
- Composers: Jonne Valtonen, Koji Kondo, Hajime Hirasawa, Yumiko Kanki, Naoto Ishida, Kenji Yamamoto, Minako Hamano, David Wise, Hajime Wakai, Toru Minegishi
- Arrangers: Jonne Valtonen, Roger Wanamo, Masashi Hamauzu, Shiro Hamaguchi, Hayato Matsuo, Torsten Rasch
- Venue: Cologne (Germany), Cologne Philharmonic Hall
- Date: 23 September 2010
- Supporting acts: Benyamin Nuss, Rony Barrak
- Producer: Thomas Böcker (Merregnon Studios)

Böcker concert chronology
- Symphonic Fantasies (2009, 2012, 2016); Symphonic Legends (23 September 2010); Symphonic Odysseys (2011, 2017)

Symphonic Legends – Music from Nintendo was a symphonic tribute concert held in Cologne, Germany on 23 September 2010 by the WDR Rundfunkorchester Köln, featuring video game music from Japanese game developer Nintendo. The concert featured symphonic arrangements found in some of Nintendo's biggest game series, such as Legend of Zelda, Super Mario Bros., Pikmin, F-Zero and Donkey Kong. The concert was produced and directed by Thomas Böcker, with arrangements provided by Finnish composers and musicians Jonne Valtonen and Roger Wanamo, as well as Japanese game music composers Masashi Hamauzu, Hayato Matsuo, Shiro Hamaguchi and German film composer Torsten Rasch.

Like the previous concerts performed by the WDR, Symphonic Legends was broadcast over radio, now in 5.1 surround sound, on the WDR4 station and was also broadcast online via live video streaming.

== Concert ==
=== Production ===
After the continued success of Symphonic Fantasies, Merregnon Studios and the WDR ambitiously announced their plans to follow up and work together once again on a new concert. On 17 December 2009, it was announced that another concert would take place in 2010 on Symphonic Fantasies website. No theme was announced for the concert until March 2010, when Winfried Fechner announced that the theme would exclusively focus on the Japanese game developer Nintendo. Thomas Böcker further added soon thereafter that the concert was to take concept he had built the previous shows on even further, and experiment extensively to push the perception of video game music arrangement more than ever before.

Symphonic Legends was said to present many innovations to orchestral video game performances due to this approach. Böcker requested that arrangers would need total freedom with their work, which Nintendo permitted. The concert was to be structured in a way that each game’s story was told, rather than just themes being performed and pieces placed in an order to maximize their impact. Thorsten Rasch was brought in to provide an arrangement for Super Metroid done in a dark, contemporary style as opposed to the more classically textured arrangement during past shows. Masashi Hamauzu commented that he had total freedom to arrange "Aquatic Ambiance" from Donkey Kong Country, and therefore could put all his skills into the arrangement.

Roger Wanamo, who assisted in the prior year’s concert Symphonic Fantasies, was given a more prominent role for Symphonic Legends, arranging the Super Mario Bros. (Retro Suite) and the Super Mario Galaxy "Galactic Suite". For the "Retro Suite", Wanamo remarked that the purpose was to properly represent the spirit of a Mario game, piecing together situations from the game in a meaningful way as it would appear in a Mario video game. For the "Galactic Suite", the game’s story was already more developed for him to take inspiration from, and so the themes could be transitioned together more effectively to tell a story of Mario’s galactic journey, jumping back and forth between small planets. Shiro Hamaguchi and Hayato Matsuo were chosen to make arrangements featuring a less experimental approach in order to balance out the concert program. Jonne Valtonen was commissioned to compose the original fanfare and as the sole arranger on Symphonic Poem, a 5 part, 35 minute symphonic movement based on the Zelda series.

Even before the set list and titles to be featured in the concert was announced, 60% of the tickets were already sold within the first few weeks of sale.

=== Legend of Zelda - Symphonic Poem ===
The Symphonic Poem of the Legend of Zelda music is told through melody in 5 movements, titled Hyrulian Child, Dark Lord, Princess of Destiny, Battlefield, and Hero of Time. The total running time for the arrangement is 35 minutes, and was presented as the entire second act of the Symphonic Legends and subsequent LEGENDS concerts. The concept was conceived by concert producer Thomas Böcker, and arranged by Jonne Valtonen. The Symphonic Poem is one of the longest orchestrated video game piece performed by an orchestra, and contains over 100,000 notes in total. The inspiration for the arrangement was the Symphonic Poem Ein Heldenleben by Richard Strauss and also music composed by Tchaikovsky. The Symphonic Poem of Legend of Zelda tells the story of Link’s journey from a spirited adolescent to the hero of time, telling the story of romance, darkness, war and hope throughout the poem, maturing the character of Link from a child to becoming a hero. The arrangement features lyrics sung in Latin, written by Thomas Böcker and Susanna Pölt.

Valtonen had previously written the Legend of Zelda arrangement featured in the touring concert act PLAY! A Video Game Symphony, but was eager to create an arrangement that would be able to take advantage of the entire Zelda universe, from character themes, situations and emotional elements often found in the series. It took Valtonen about five months to create the arrangement, with three months used for researching the Zelda universe, and two months for the actual writing. Valtonen also expressed that he wanted the arrangement to create “discussion” within the Zelda fan base.

=== Show ===
The concert was held on September 23, 2010. The event was preceded by a Meet and Greet session with Jonne Valtonen, Roger Wanamo and Benyamin Nuss in attendance. Torsten Rasch was also on hand to attend the concert. It was held in the Cologne Philharmonic Hall, and was a sold out event for the venue. The concert was performed by WDR Radio Orchestra Cologne and State Choir LATVIJA, conducted by Niklas Willén. Juraj Cizmarovic was the concertmaster for the event. Willén had previously conducted the recording of Valtonen’s fanfare for Symphonic Fantasies.

The games represented were taken from the Japanese video game developer Nintendo. Each piece was constructed as a suite, containing one or more songs arranged together in a sophisticated medley structure. The moderator of the night was Ralph Erdenberger, who would introduce the upcoming musical pieces as well as offer humorous anecdotes. The concert offered a mixture of structures that longtime attendees had grown accustomed to, with the first act being dedicated to a larger number of titles (much like Symphonic Shades) and the second act consisting entirely of a Symphonic Poem, a five-part movement dedicated solely to the Legend of Zelda (similar to the longer suites presented in Symphonic Fantasies).

Symphonic Legends opened with an original fanfare composed by Jonne Valtonen for the event. The composition was written to reflect themes associated with Nintendo and to introduce the orchestra to the audience. The fanfare was titled Fanfare For the Common 8-Bit Hero.

The first arrangement of the night was Starwing And Lylat Wars (Space Suite), arranged by famed animation and video game composer Shiro Hamaguchi. Hamaguchi’s arrangement made extensive use of the State Choir LATVIJA to represent the dramatic space battles found in the video game series. The original music was composed by Hajime Hirasawa and Koji Kondo. The Super Mario Bros. (Retro Suite) featured songs from most mainline Mario video games, excluding the Galaxy games, and was arranged by Roger Wanamo. His arrangement made use of light tone, emphasizing the jovial nature of the Mario games. Wanamo also made use of the layering technique that he introduced in his Chrono Trigger\Cross arrangement from the Symphonic Fantasies event. The music featured in this arrangement was composed by Koji Kondo.

Shiro Hamaguchi offered his second arrangement of the night with F-Zero (Race Suite). Unlike the games, which feature a very fast-paced hard rock and metal style soundtrack, Hamaguchi’s arrangements significantly slowed down the source material and emphasized the drama and danger of the fast futuristic race he set out to depict. Prior to the orchestra’s performance, Rony Barrak performed a Darbuka solo in order to create the atmosphere of tension prior to the race, and joined the orchestra along the main melodic parts. Torsten Rasch offered the most unconventional arrangement to Symphonic Legends, by mixing original composition and abstract dark arrangement in the Super Metroid (Galactic Warrior Suite). This was done in order to tell explore and communicate Samus Aran’s inner chaos as a space warrior, and only provided a melodic triumph at the very end. The original music was composed by Kenji Yamamoto and Minako Hamano.

Benyamin Nuss joined on stage to perform piano for the Donkey Kong Country (Aquatic Ambiance) piece, arranged by Masashi Hamauzu. The arrangement was a highly emotional angled interpretation of the source material, featuring delicate interplay between Nuss’s piano and Cizmarovic’s violin. The original composition was done by David Wise. Pikmin (Variations on a World Map Theme) was another lighthearted arrangement, portraying the colorful cast of Pikmin as well as bring nature element to the forefront. The piece was arranged by video game composer and orchestrator Hayato Matsuo and composed by Hajime Wakai. The first act was closed out by Wanamo’s arrangement of the Super Mario Galaxy soundtrack in Mario Galaxy (Galactic Suite). Due to the original game being orchestrated already, the arrangement featured little interpretation, focusing more on the transitioning between the songs and placing between them to accurately portray the game in symphony.

The second act was made up entirely by a five-movement Symphonic Poem. The piece was dedicated to the Legend of Zelda series, and was arranged by Jonne Valtonen. The structure of the arrangement was inspired by Ein Heldenleben. Over the course of the 35 minute arrangement, the story of Link is told through 5 submovements. In order to tell a fully developed story, it making use of emotional overtones and melodic narrative, with passages inspired greatly by cinema. There are over 100,000 notes found in Symphonic Poem, and is the longest video game arrangement commissioned for an orchestra concert. Rony Barrak joined the orchestra for this piece at certain points throughout the performance.

An encore was performed after the standing ovation given from the crowd, featuring many of the famous ending themes from the games featured. The word "Nintendo" could be heard sung from the choir during the ending theme of Super Mario Bros., which closed out the concert.

Symphonic Legends was broadcast over radio in 5.1 surround sound on the WDR4 station and was also broadcast online via live video streaming.

=== Set List ===
1. "Fanfare for the Common 8-bit Hero"
2. "Starwing And Lylat Wars (Space Suite)"
3. "Super Mario Bros. (Retro Suite)"
4. "F-Zero (Race Suite)"
5. "Super Metroid (Galactic Warrior Suite)"
6. "Donkey Kong Country (Aquatic Ambiance)"
7. "Pikmin (Variation on a World Map Theme)"
8. "Super Mario Galaxy (Galactic Suite)"
9. "Symphonic Poem"

=== Reception ===
Symphonic Legends received critical acclaim after the event was held. Audun Sorlie of Original Sound Version stated "it [Symphonic Legends] combined what I loved about Symphonic Shades with its diversity in style along the prestige and importance that Symphonic Fantasies offered. Most importantly, they dared to be a bit different and gave us exclusive takes on so many familiar songs, takes that will never fade in our memories due to being so different." and added "it was a dream come true and a true gift to my life that I could be in attendance, one that I will always cherish and remember." Chris Greening of Square Enix Music Online said "The concert offers everything from gushing and epic orchestrations, to clever melodic and harmonic treatments, to impressionist and expressionist masterpieces, to even a full-length symphonic poem, highlighting every section of the orchestra and several soloists along the way." Andreas Hackl of VGM Lounge concluded in his review that "Symphonic Legends achieved the same quality found in Symphonic Fantasies."

Some criticism was given to the controversial Super Metroid arrangement by Torsten Rasch however, feeling that the piece was too far removed from the original source material. Likewise, some felt Symphonic Poem was indeed too long compared to the more traditional arrangements often heard for video game music.

Nevertheless, Symphonic Legends won the Best Live Concert award from the OSVOSTOTY 2010 Awards, and the Best Concert award from Level Magazine .

== LEGENDS ==
On 1 June 2011, a concert based partially on the arrangements of Symphonic Legends was held in Stockholm, titled LEGENDS. The event was produced by Thomas Böcker and featured arrangements based on the many titles of Nintendo by Jonne Valtonen, Roger Wanamo and Masashi Hamauzu, who were all in attendance for the event. The concert was performed by the Royal Stockholm Philharmonic Orchestra and Gustaf Sjökvists Chamber Choir, conducted by Arnie Roth.

Numerous changes were made in order to give the Stockholm audience their own experience rather than a reprise. As such, the arrangements by Shiro Hamaguchi, Hayato Matsuo and Torsten Rasch were replaced by all new arrangements by Valtonen, Hamauzu and Wanamo. In addition, an arrangement of Kirby by Hamauzu was also added to the setlist. Symphonic Poem had some details and nuances tweaked, and was used as the entire second act like it had been at Symphonic Legends. Benyamin Nuss was also on hand to play piano during the new F-Zero arrangement for the event as well as the "Aquatic Ambiance" piece. The Metroid piece was completely rearranged by Jonne Valtonen, and featured spoken narration, retaining still an experimental take on the original material. An extra encore number was added as well, the "Fairy Fountain" theme from Legend of Zelda.

In attendance was also David Wise, composer of Donkey Kong Country, who stated the event was a “dream come true” for him. In addition to the concert, an exhibition of Nintendo products was set up in the lobby area of the Concert House, including classic game packaging and a life size Link statue.

The concert garnered positive reviews from the press, with Audun Sorlie of Original Sound Version closing his report saying “Nintendo is all about bringing friends and family together, and give them experiences they will never forget. LEGENDS did the very same thing.”
