= Andy Brick =

American composer, conductor and symphonist

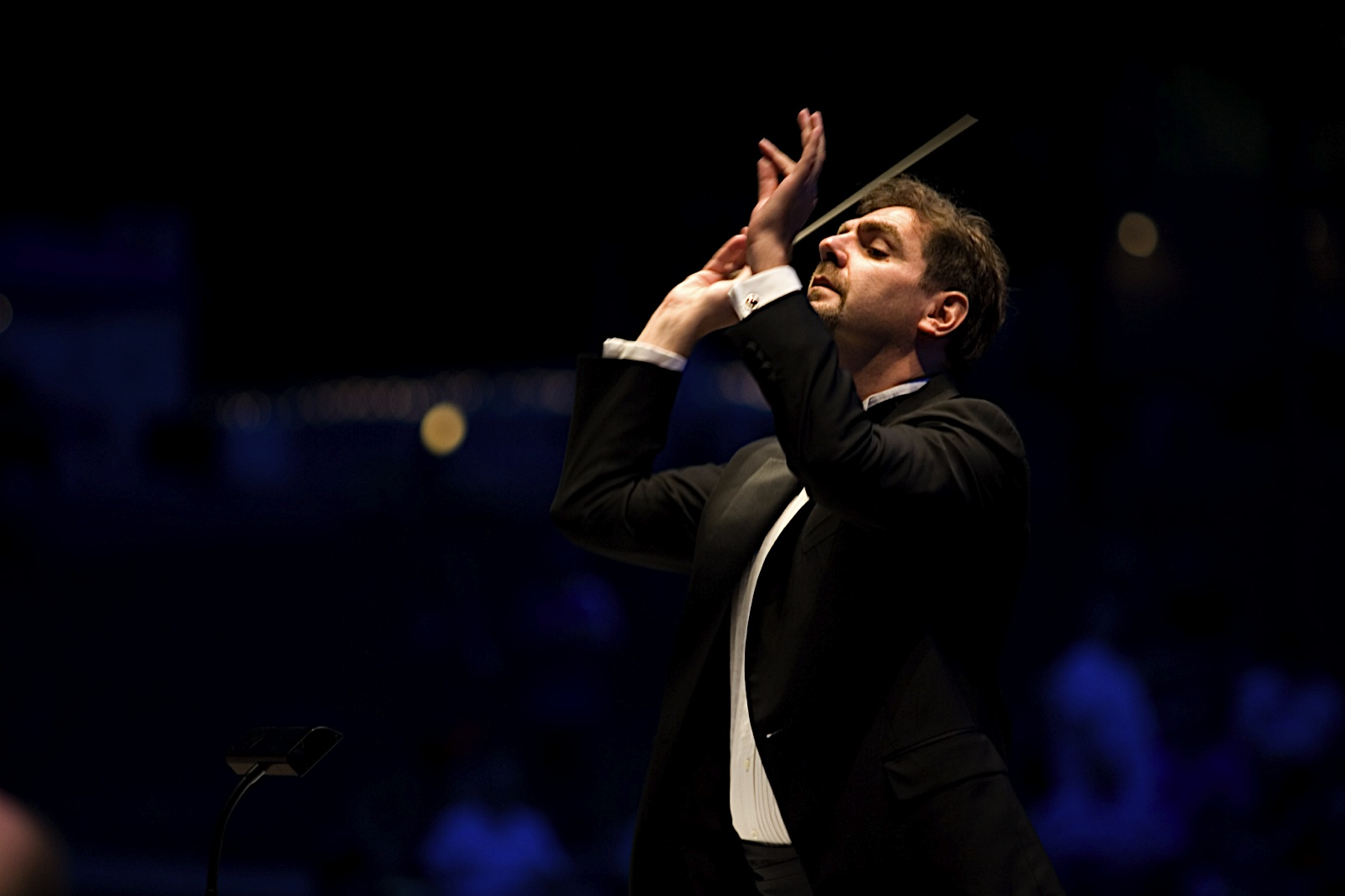
Andy Brick

Andy Brick (born June 8, 1965) is an American composer, conductor, and symphonist notable for his contributions to film scores, video game music and symphonic game music concerts.

== Early life and education ==
Brick was born in New York but grew up in suburban Chicago. Brick studied composition under Pulitzer Prize winning composer Leslie Bassett at the University of Michigan and completed graduate studies in composition at the Mannes School of Music in Manhattan. In 1990, After completing his formal conservatory studies, Brick began scoring independent films. In 1996 Brick won the American Society of Composers, Authors and Publishers young film composers competition. He later studied under, and worked with, famed Walt Disney orchestrator Danny Troob and Maestro Paul Lustig Dunkel of the American Composers Orchestra

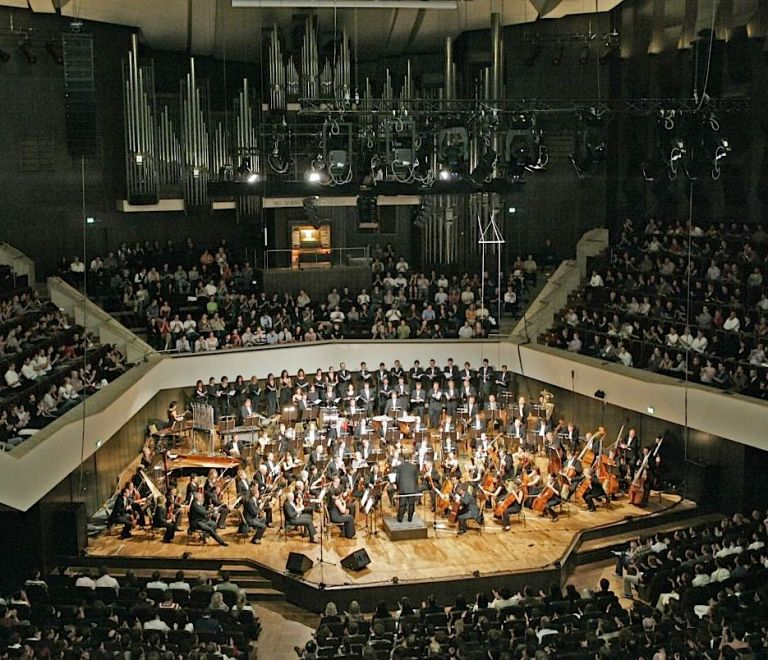
Andy Brick Conducts the Czech National Symphony at the Gewandhaus

== Video game and film music ==
Brick has composed and/or orchestrated music for game titles that include Maxis' Sim City: Rush Hour, Midway's Stranglehold, Electronic Arts' The Sims 2 and Warhammer Online: Age of Reckoning as well as Nintendo's Super Mario Bros., Bungie's Halo 3, and Square Enix's Final Fantasy series. His music has also been featured in such game titles as Arc the Lad by Working Designs, Shadoan by Interplay, The Far Reaches by 3DO, Tesselmania by MECC and others.

== Live concerts ==
In August 2003 Brick conducted the Czech National Symphony Orchestra in the first Symphonic Game Music Concert outside Japan, at the Gewandhaus in Leipzig, Germany. Andy wrote the fanfare to this historic concert event where his music for Merregnon was featured. Andy Brick served as the exclusive principal conductor and music director of the concert series leading repeatedly sold-out performances from 2003–2007. In 2020 Brick premiered Game ON! with National Symphony Orchestra at the historic John F. Kennedy Center for the Performing Arts

Brick has conducted over 70 game titles including Final Fantasy, Super Mario Bros., Legend of Zelda, Halo, and World of Warcraft with orchestras throughout the world including Prague Symphony Orchestra, Moravian Philharmonic, Bratislava Symphony, The Czech National Symphony, The North Carolina Symphony, The Eugene Symphony, The Filmharmonic of Prague and members of the New York Philharmonic and Detroit Symphony. His performances have been described as "Mesmerizing" leading to "Thunderous ovations generally reserved for Rock Stars." He has also worked in films for productions such as The Little Mermaid II: Return to the Sea and The Music Man.

Brick served as Distinguished Professor and Director of the Music and Technology department at Stevens Institute of Technology in Hoboken, New Jersey. He has also been the subject of feature stories on the CBS Evening News, and Billboard Magazine.
