= Benyamin Nuss =

German pianist and composer (born 1989)

- Born: June 20, 1989 (age 37); Bergisch Gladbach, Germany
- Genres: Video game music; Classical music; Jazz
- Instrument: Piano
- Labels: Materia Collective; Mons Records; Wayo Records; Neue Meister

Benyamin Nuss (born 20 June 1989) is a German pianist and composer.

== Life ==
Nuss was born in Bergisch Gladbach, Germany. He began playing the piano at age 6 in 1995 and was taught and supported by his then teacher Viktor Langemann. He also was greatly supported by his father, the internationally renowned Jazz trombonist Ludwig Nuss. His uncle is jazz pianist Hubert Nuss. With a good environment, he grew up with music from different genres. Later, inspired by “Doctor Gradus ad Parnassum” from “Children’s Corner,” he began at the age of ten to study the composer Claude Debussy, and soon after the works of Maurice Ravel.

In 2004, Nuss was taught privately with concert-pianist Andreas Frölich in Bonn, Germany, and later changed teachers to Ilja Scheps as a youth-student. After high school, Nuss studied at the Hochschule für Musik Köln and graduated with a Bachelor in Music. He visited masterclasses there with Anatol Ugorski, Einar Steen-Nokleberg and Ragna Schirmer.

Through his success in German national music competition Jugend Musiziert, Nuss was invited to play concerts with the Youth Orchestra of North Rhine-Westphalia. In 2006, Nuss received a stipendium from the Werner Richard - Dr. Carl Dörken Stiftung and played recitals and concerts with different orchestras of North Rhine-Westphalia. In 2008, he was chosen for "Best of NRW", which allowed him to play twelve concerts in diverse concert halls in North Rhine-Westphalia.

Besides his love for classical music and jazz, he always had a passion for videogames and videogame music. He was the featured soloist in the award-winning Symphonic Fantasies and Distant Worlds: Music from Final Fantasy concerts in Tokyo, Chicago, Cologne and Stockholm. Additionally, his first soundtrack released was a tribute to Japanese composer Nobuo Uematsu, the former composer of the Japanese video game series, Final Fantasy.

In 2010, Benyamin did a tour through Germany, where he played again in many major concert halls, among them the Berliner Philharmonie, Frankfurt Alte Oper, Hamburg Laeiszhalle, Stuttgart "Liederhalle" and many more. Since then, Nuss has played solo performances on TV, like in “Stars von Morgen” with Rolando Villazón and performed in front of German Chancellor, Angela Merkel.

In 2012, he recorded his second album, titled Exotica, which was followed by concerts in Tokyo and Singapore. Afterwards, did recordings and concerts for radio stations, performing Gershwin's “Concert For Piano in F” with the Deutsche Radio Philharmonie – Saarbrücken, Rhapsody In Blue, and Ravel's Piano Concerto Nr.2 with the WDR Rundfunk Orchester.

Lately, he has worked in close collaboration with Japanese composer Masashi Hamauzu, performing his compositions in Piano Works Delta/Epsilon/T_Comp1 (2013), Opus 4 Piano and Chamber Music Works (2014), and also some pieces in Benyamin's own album Exotica. Both of these were not released in any soundtrack, and are found only on his official YouTube channel.

Nuss performed piano at a Fanfest event for the Japanese MMORPG Final Fantasy XIV in 2017 in Frankfurt, Germany, performing alongside vocalist Susan Calloway in a concert performance playing a number of popular music tracks from the Final Fantasy XIV game. Nuss was praised by Japanese composer Nobuo Uematsu at the event for his piano performance citing his passion for both the piano and the music he played.

Nuss performed piano at another Fanfest event in 2019 in Paris, France, performing alongside vocalist Susan Calloway in a concert performance playing some news tracks from Final Fantasy XIV.

In December 2025, he took part in an Italy tour called “Echoes of Light” together with composer Yoko Shimomura, performing the most iconic pieces from Kingdom Hearts, Final Fantasy XV, Street Fighter II, Super Mario RPG, and Front Mission.

== Albums ==
- 2010 – Benyamin Nuss Plays Uematsu; Deutsche Grammophon
- 2012 – Exotica; Deutsche Grammophon
  - with works by Claude Debussy, Darius Milhaud, Heitor Villa-Lobos, Alberto Ginastera, Charles T. Griffes, Mily Balakirev, Alan Hovhaness, Alexandre Tansman, Martin Torp, Benyamin Nuss, Jonne Valtonen and Masashi Hamauzu
- 2014 – Masashi Hamauzu: Opus 4, with Lisa Schumann (Violin) and Kana Shirao (Cello); Mons Records
- 2015 – Paul Juon: Silhouettes op. 9 and op. 43, Sieben kleine Tondichtungen op. 81, with Malwina Sosnowski (Violin) und Rebekka Hartmann (Violin); Musiques Suisses
- 2016 – Nikolai Kapustin: Works for Cello, with Christine Rauh (cello); SWR Music
- 2018 – Mia Brentano’s Hidden Sea: 20 Songs for 2 Pianos, with Max Nyberg (2nd Piano); Mons Records
- 2022 – Mia Brentano’s Summerhouse: New Music for 2 Pianos, with Billy Test (2nd Piano); Mons Records

== Video games ==
- 2013 - Kingdom Hearts HD 1.5 Remix; Performed Lord of the Castle
- 2014 - Kingdom Hearts HD 2.5 Remix
- 2016 - World of Final Fantasy
- 2017 - Kingdom Hearts Orchestra -World Tour-
