= Sega Rally 2006 =

2006 video game

- Developer: Sega AM3
- Publisher: Sega
- Composers: Takenobu Mitsuyoshi; Jun Senoue; Hiroshi Kawaguchi; Kentaro Kobayashi; Takeshi Isozaki; Hideki Naganuma; Richard Jacques
- Series: Sega Rally
- Platform: PlayStation 2
- Release: JP: January 12, 2006
- Genre: Racing game
- Mode: Single-player

Sega Rally 2006 is an arcade racing game developed and published by Sega for PlayStation 2. The third installment in the Sega Rally series, it was released in Japan and Asia on January 12, 2006.

== Gameplay ==
Like its predecessors, the objective of the game is to successfully drive along tracks with different surfaces (with the car's handling changing accordingly) while reaching checkpoints and thus be rewarded with more time to allow the player to reach the goal. If the player doesn't reach the finish line in time, then the game will be over. Sega Rally 2006 doesn't support surround sound like its predecessor, Sega Rally 2, and only supports Stereo/Mono sound. The game also has a widescreen support.

Sega Rally 2006 features three game modes: Career Mode, Arcade Mode and the classical Time Attack Mode:

- The Arcade Mode is based on checkpoints. The player can select between Series 1 (Easy), Series 2 (Normal) or Series 3 (Hard) for a 4-stages championship with the goal of reaching the finish line by the end of the series and to become the Champion. The player starts each series from the 15th position and race on various predetermined weather/daytime conditions in European, Asian, African, North American, Scandinavian or Circuit rounds. It is possible to race the Arcade Mode with Professional, Extra or Career tuned cars. After completing the first Series, another set of stages, Series 4, Series 5 & Series 6, is unlocked. Series 4 tracks are remakes of tracks from the original game. Beating this second set of stages unlocks the three "Extra" cars taken from the original arcade game.
- The Career Mode has four race types: 1 on 1, race against seven AI-controlled cars, Time Attack & Total Time Series Rally. The Career mode is divided in two categories, Amateur and Professional, which themselves are divided in Open, Class 1 & Class 2 series of races. The Sega Rally Championship is only available once the player has passed the Professional category.

== Development ==
Announced in 2004, Sega initially planned to release the game in 2005 as a 10-year anniversary celebration version that was to be named Sega Rally 2005, but the game was delayed for January 2006 and was renamed to Sega Rally 2006 accordingly. Logitech released an exclusive version of their GT Force Pro driving wheel to coincide with the game's release. A limited edition that included the original arcade game on a separate disc was also distributed.
