= Sega Rally 3 =

2008 video game

Sega Rally 3 Sega Rally Online Arcade
- Developers: Sega Racing Studio; Sumo Digital (PS3, 360)
- Publisher: Sega Amusements International
- Series: Sega Rally
- Platforms: Arcade, PlayStation 3 (PSN), Xbox 360 (XBLA)
- Release: Arcade: EU: June 2008; Xbox 360 (XBLA): US/EU: May 18, 2011; PlayStation 3 (PSN): US: June 1, 2011; EU: July 6, 2011
- Genre: Racing game
- Modes: Single-player, multiplayer
- Arcade system: Sega Europa-R

Sega Rally 3 is the arcade sequel to Sega Rally 2, developed and released by Sega in 2008. Unlike most other installments in the series, this was not released in Japan. Home version was released for the Xbox 360 and PlayStation 3 in 2011 as Sega Rally Online Arcade.

== Gameplay ==
Sega Rally 3 contains three racing modes: World Championship, Quick Race and Classic. World Championship mode is a single player game which takes place across three stages (Tropical, Canyon and Alpine) and largely follows the format of the previous Sega Rally arcade games. The game is a 22 car race played to a time limit, and the player's starting position for one race is determined by their finishing position in the previous race. Unlike the previous games in the series, each race contains two laps. If the player finishes the third stage in first place, they are able to play a head-to-head race on the bonus Lakeside track.

Quick Race is a single or multiplayer mode, in which six cars (containing any mixture of human and AI players) race three laps on any of the three World Championship courses. In World Championship and Quick Race modes, players can choose from one of six licensed cars from Citroën C4 WRC, Ford Focus RS WRC 07, Mitsubishi Lancer Evolution X, Peugeot 207 S2000, Subaru Impreza WRC 08 and Suzuki SX4 WRC. Additionally, in Quick Race players can choose two secret cars: the Bowler Nemesis and the McRae Enduro.

Classic mode is a single or multiplayer mode which takes place on the Desert '95 track, recreated from the original Sega Rally arcade game. In single player, the mode is a head-to-head race against a single AI opponent, while multiplayer allows for up to six human players with no AI opponents. The sixth generation Toyota Celica GT-Four and Lancia Delta HF Integrale cars from the original Sega Rally can be used in this mode exclusively.

== Development ==
The game was developed simultaneously with Sega Rally Revo, which became its basis. During development, it went under the codename of 'Super Challenge'. The game runs at 60 frame/s at a 720p resolution as opposed to the 30 frames per second of its console counterpart due to the power of the new Sega Europa-R arcade hardware.

Sega Rally 3 was released in 2011 on Xbox Live Arcade and PlayStation Network as Sega Rally Online Arcade, essentially the same title, except with a few extras including the original Sega Rally 1995 Desert track. The game has been delisted for Xbox Live Arcade and PlayStation Network in 2012 for unexplained reasons.

== Cabinet ==
Sega Rally 3 is available in four different cabinet configurations: a large single player deluxe cabinet with motion simulation system, a large single player deluxe non-motion cabinet, a smaller twin non-motion cabinet and finally a single player non-motion cabinet (for the US market only). The game is also available in a conversion kit, which changes an existing game to Sega Rally 3.

The deluxe motion cabinet includes a 62" High Definition DLP monitor and a dual actuator motion simulation system which moves the players seat in direct response to the on screen action. Up to six cabinets can be linked for multiplayer racing.

In November 2010, Sega Amusements USA had Sega Rally 3 kit setup at their booth for the International Association of Amusement Parks and Attractions (IAAPA) Expo. The kit was designed for old Atari, Midway or Raw Thrills cabinets and offers an optional 27" open frame LCD monitor as a part of the package.
