= Virtua Cop =

1994 video game

- Japanese arcade flyer
- Developer: Sega AM2
- Publisher: Sega: PAL: Acclaim Entertainment (PS2)
- Producer: Yu Suzuki
- Programmer: Katsunori Itai
- Artist: Akihito Hiroyoshi
- Composer: Kentaro Koyama
- Series: Virtua Cop
- Platforms: Arcade, Sega Saturn, Windows, R-Zone, PlayStation 2
- Release: September 1994: Arcade; JP: September 1994; EU: October 1994; NA: November 1994 Saturn; NA: November 15, 1995; JP: November 24, 1995; EU: December 8, 1995 Windows; JP: October 25, 1996; NA: November 11, 1996; EU: 1997 PlayStation 2; JP: August 15, 2002; EU: November 29, 2002
- Genre: Light gun shooter
- Modes: Single-player, multiplayer
- Arcade system: Sega Model 2

Virtua Cop (Note: Japanese: バーチャコップ, Hepburn: Bācha Koppu) is a 1994 light gun shooter video game developed and published by Sega for arcades. It was developed for the Sega Model 2 system, and was ported to the Sega Saturn in 1995 and Windows as Virtua Squad in 1996. The Saturn version included support for both the Virtua Gun and Saturn mouse, as well as a new "Training Mode" which consists of a randomly generated shooting gallery.

Virtua Cop was notable for its use of real-time 3D polygon graphics with texture mapping, with Sega advertising it as "the world's first texture mapped, polygon action game". Emphasizing the real-time nature of the game, enemies would react differently depending on where they were shot. It was one of the first games to allow the player to shoot through glass. Its name is derived from its 3D graphical style, which was previously used in Virtua Racing and Virtua Fighter, and later Virtua Striker.

Despite some initial skepticism over its introduction of 3D polygons in a genre that previously used realistic digitized sprites (most notably Lethal Enforcers), Virtua Cop went on to become a commercial success and received critical acclaim for enhancing the genre with its 3D graphics, camera system, realistic animations, and ability to target specific body parts with realistic consequences. It was influential on later shooter games, with 3D polygons being adopted by subsequent light gun shooters such as Time Crisis (1995) and The House of the Dead (1996) instead of the digitized sprites previously used in the genre, as well as inspiring the first-person shooter GoldenEye 007 (1997).

Virtua Cop was followed by Virtua Cop 2 and Virtua Cop 3. The game was later bundled with Virtua Cop 2 in Japan and Europe on the PlayStation 2 as Virtua Cop: Elite Edition (Virtua Cop Rebirth in Japan) on August 25 and November 29, 2002 respectively. It included gallery extras and implementation of Namco's G-Con 2 lightgun support. In 2004, a port was developed for the handheld Nokia N-Gage, but was cancelled by the quality control team before its release. Very few beta units of the N-Gage version were manufactured.

== Gameplay ==
Players assume the role of police officers - either Michael Hardy, or his partner, James Cools. Played in a first-person perspective, players must use a light gun (or a joypad in the Sega Saturn version) to shoot criminals and advance through the game. Players begin the game with a reloadable chamber of six bullets and a set number of lives. Taking enemy fire causes the player to lose a life; power-ups can be shot to grant the player a special weapon or even an extra life. There are also civilians that the player must not harm during the stage. If the player hits a civilian, the player loses a life. The special weapon will be lost if the player takes damage, but not if they shoot a civilian. Players can score extra points for "justice shots" (disarming an enemy without killing them, done by shooting their hand) and "bullseyes" (shooting the center of the target circle).

The Saturn version introduced a Training Mode consisting of two activities: Exercise, a target-shooting practice mode, and VS Play, in which two players compete against one another. The console release also allowed players to adjust settings including difficulty, the number of lives and continues, and the targeting sight.

== Story ==
A detective in the player's department uncovers an illegal gunrunning operation and traces it back to a powerful crime syndicate named E.V.I.L. Inc. He compiles a large amount of evidence and is ready to take them down, but he is discovered and assassinated. Some of the evidence manages to make its way back to headquarters and a special task force is put on the case. The policemen Michael "Rage" Hardy and James "Smarty" Cools must face that organization led by Joe Fang and his followers Kong, the King, and the Boss.

== Development ==
Katsunori Itai and Akihito Hiroyoshi served as the lead developers on Virtua Cop, with Yu Suzuki serving as supervisor. The game's targeting reticles and zooming camera were inspired by a commercial for Pokka Kilimanjaro coffee. Kenneth Ibrahim, who voiced the navigator in Sega Rally Championship, voiced the civilians.

A division of Sega AM2 began work on the Saturn version in April 1995. Along with the Saturn version of Virtua Fighter 2, it was one of the first games to make use of the Sega Graphics Library operating system. In June 1995, Sega Saturn Magazine reported that the Saturn conversion was approximately 20 percent complete. The first stage's environments had been recreated and enemy characters were already animated, although their textures had not yet been implemented. Sega AM2 explained that the conversion was being developed alongside improvements to the Saturn's new operating system, with the development team providing feedback to the programmers responsible for refining it. The developers sought to reproduce the arcade version's targeting system and enemy behaviour, with contemporary comparisons showing similar enemy positioning and movement despite the Saturn version's unfinished graphics. During development, AM2 also confirmed plans for compatibility with the Sega Saturn mouse and discussed work on a dedicated light-gun peripheral, although its release arrangements had not yet been finalised.

Saturn port director Takashi Isono said: "We are trying to keep to the quality of the arcade. If three of us agree for improvement, then we try to modify the graphics". The Saturn version features a full-motion video sequence of Michael and James driving on the dockyard before confronting Kong; designer Kazufumi Ohashi originally animated Kong flipping the bird, which Isono rejected, moving Ohashi to work on the training mode instead.

In June, the team displayed a playable demo of the Saturn version's first level at the Tokyo Toy Show. They subsequently began work on the third level, since it was the most difficult to convert due to the large polygon areas of the office building walls and ceiling.

Contemporary coverage in Sega Saturn Magazine charted the Saturn conversion's development from approximately 20% complete in early April 1995 to 30% in early June and 80% in early August. The game was reported complete ahead of its November release.

In an interview following the game's completion, Saturn conversion director Takashi Isono explained that the team had made several changes to the arcade version, including separate score displays for two-player games and differently coloured targeting cursors. He also discussed the production of a new, approximately two-minute opening sequence for the Saturn release, which involved the game's design staff.

The Saturn soundtrack retained the arcade game's music but used CD-recorded versions, with the sound team incorporating additional endings and fade-outs into some compositions.

== In other games ==
- Sega Superstars Tennis features a minigame based on Virtua Cop called Virtua Squad.
- The default gun, the Guardian, can be used in Ghost Squad; however, it can only be obtained by playing the IC Card or Evolution versions.
- Tiger Electronics made a version of Virtua Cop for the R-Zone.

== Reception ==
=== Arcade ===
Arcade reception

Review scores
Publication	Score
Computer and Video Games	87%
Next Generation	3/5
Games World	82%

In Japan, Game Machine listed Virtua Cop as the second most successful upright/cockpit arcade cabinet of October 1994. In North America, RePlay reported Virtua Cop to be the fifth most popular arcade game of April 1995. It went on to become the highest-grossing dedicated arcade game of 1995 in Japan, and one of the top ten best-selling arcade video games of the year in the US.

The arcade game received generally positive reviews from critics. Tim Davis of Electronic Gaming Monthly gave it a positive review, praising the polygon graphics, the zooming camera "that takes you all over" the place, the "automatic target sighting which pinpoints" enemies, and the weapon power-ups. Computer and Video Games also gave it a positive review, calling it "a classy title" and praising the 3D graphics, "excellent" animation, weapon power-ups, and the gameplay in both single-player and multiplayer modes. Games World magazine called it an "excellent fun" game, comparing it favorably with the shooters Operation Wolf (1987) and Lethal Enforcers (1992) as well as the film Reservoir Dogs (1992), while Dave Perry said the Virtua Fighter like 3D targets made it a "more challenging and satisfying" shooter.

There was initially some skepticism over its introduction of 3D polygons in a genre that previously used realistic digitized sprites, most notably Konami's Lethal Enforcers. Next Generation initially gave Virtua Cop a mixed review in 1994, stating that Sega were "recklessly applying new technology to games that don't need it" but that "if players were given a chance to freely explore their mapped-out environments, this game would be a winner, but as it is, Virtua Cop is just an old game with a new gimmick". Next Generation later revised their views, praising its use of 3D technology to introduce the ability to target specific body parts with realistic consequences, which "totally eliminates the hit or miss polarity of other light-gun games and adds a whole new level of detail to the genre".

In 1996, Next Generation listed the Virtua Cop series (which then consisted of just Virtua Cop and the arcade version of Virtua Cop 2) at number 82 on their "Top 100 Games of All Time", praising the skill and realism invoked by the enemies' differing reactions to being shot in different places.

=== Saturn ===
Reception

Review scores
Publication	Score
Computer and Video Games	96%
Edge	7/10
Electronic Gaming Monthly	30/40
Famitsu	8/10, 9/10, 8/10, 7/10
Game Informer	8/10
GamePro	19.5/20
GamesMaster	95%
Mean Machines Sega	94%
Next Generation	4/5
Maximum	5/5
Sega Saturn Magazine	96%

Award
Publication	Award
Game Players	Best Shooter

Upon release of the Saturn version, the game sold over 300,000 copies in its first week of release in Japan. Its Japanese sales reached 455,396 units by the end of 1995, and 482,362 units in total. In the United States, it sold more than 500,000 bundled copies by December 1996, bringing total sales to more than 982,362 copies sold in Japan and the United States. In France, Sega France general manager Bruno Charpentier identified Virtua Cop, alongside Sega Rally Championship and Virtua Fighter 2, as one of three arcade conversions that had substantially boosted Saturn hardware sales. According to Charpentier, Sega gained ten points of market share against Sony between December 1995 and February 1996.

The Saturn version received positive reviews from critics. Next Generation gave it a positive review, applauding the impeccable accuracy of the port, but opted not to give it the full five stars they awarded to the Saturn's other two arcade ports of that month (Virtua Fighter 2 and Sega Rally Championship), as they found that the game, while sufficiently long for an arcade game, was too short for a home console release. Game Informer's Reiner, Andy, and Paul gave the Saturn version scores of 8.5, 8.25 and 7.5 out of 10, praising the game as one of the best in its genre but noting that it lacked longevity for a console release.

Rad Automatic of Sega Saturn Magazine said of the Saturn version: "It's got more depth than you'd imagine but is still mindless enough to be frenetically playable." He praised the effectiveness of the joypad control with its two cursor movement speeds, the authentic arcade feel when playing with two Virtua Guns, and the realism compared to other light gun games: "You don't see thousands of enemies popping up from behind exactly the same barrel ... In fact, you won't see enemies popping up from barrels at all that much, as your foes arrive on screen in far more interesting ways".

All four reviewers of Electronic Gaming Monthly praised it as a flawless conversion of the arcade game, though half of them also remarked that they felt the game itself is too short and lacks lasting appeal. Scary Larry of GamePro praised the realistic and stylish graphics and the Virtua Gun action. Similarly to EGM's reviewers, he remarked that the game is a near-perfect arcade port but too short and completely lacking in replay value, though he nonetheless gave it an overall recommendation. Maximum instead argued that the game is compelling enough to be played over and over again despite the lack of replay value. They also described the Saturn conversion as nearly identical to the arcade original, and remarked that the mindlessness and simplicity of the game make it particularly enjoyable.

Game Players gave the Saturn version of Virtua Cop the award for "Best Shooter" of 1995, calling it "beyond entertaining — it's therapeutic." In 1996, GamesMaster rated the Saturn version 4th on their "The GamesMaster Saturn Top 10."

=== PC ===
PC reviews

Review scores
Publication	Score
GameSpot	7.8/10
Next Generation	2/5

Time Soete of GameSpot said the PC version is jerkier than the Saturn version and less intense without the use of a light gun, but that the mouse control is surprisingly smooth and that it retains enough of the fun of the arcade and Saturn versions to appeal to newcomers to the game. Next Generation voiced similar criticisms: "It's noticeably slower on the majority of PCs than in the arcade or on Saturn, running at speed only on the most high-end Pentiums. Worse, played without a light gun using only the mouse, the game loses a major part of its appeal..." They concluded that the game felt out of place on PC.

== Legacy ==
Virtua Cop was a major influence on both light gun shooters as well as first-person shooters. When it was released in 1994, the game broke new ground by introducing the use of 3D polygons to the shooter genre. Some of the popular light gun rail shooters influenced by Virtua Cop include the Time Crisis series, The House of the Dead series, various Resident Evil spin-offs, and Dead Space: Extraction.

Virtua Cop was also the primary influence on the seminal first-person shooter GoldenEye 007, which was originally envisioned as an on-rails light gun shooter akin to Virtua Cop before it ended up as an off-rails first-person shooter. According to creator Martin Hollis: "We ended up with innovative gameplay, in part because we had Virtua Cop features in a FPS: A gun that only holds 7 bullets and a reload button, lots of position-dependent hit animations, innocents you shouldn’t kill, and an aiming mode. When you press R in GoldenEye, the game basically switches to a Virtua Cop mode. Perhaps more importantly following the lead from Virtua Cop, the game was filled with action. There was lots to do, with very few pauses".
