= R-Zone =

Portable game console

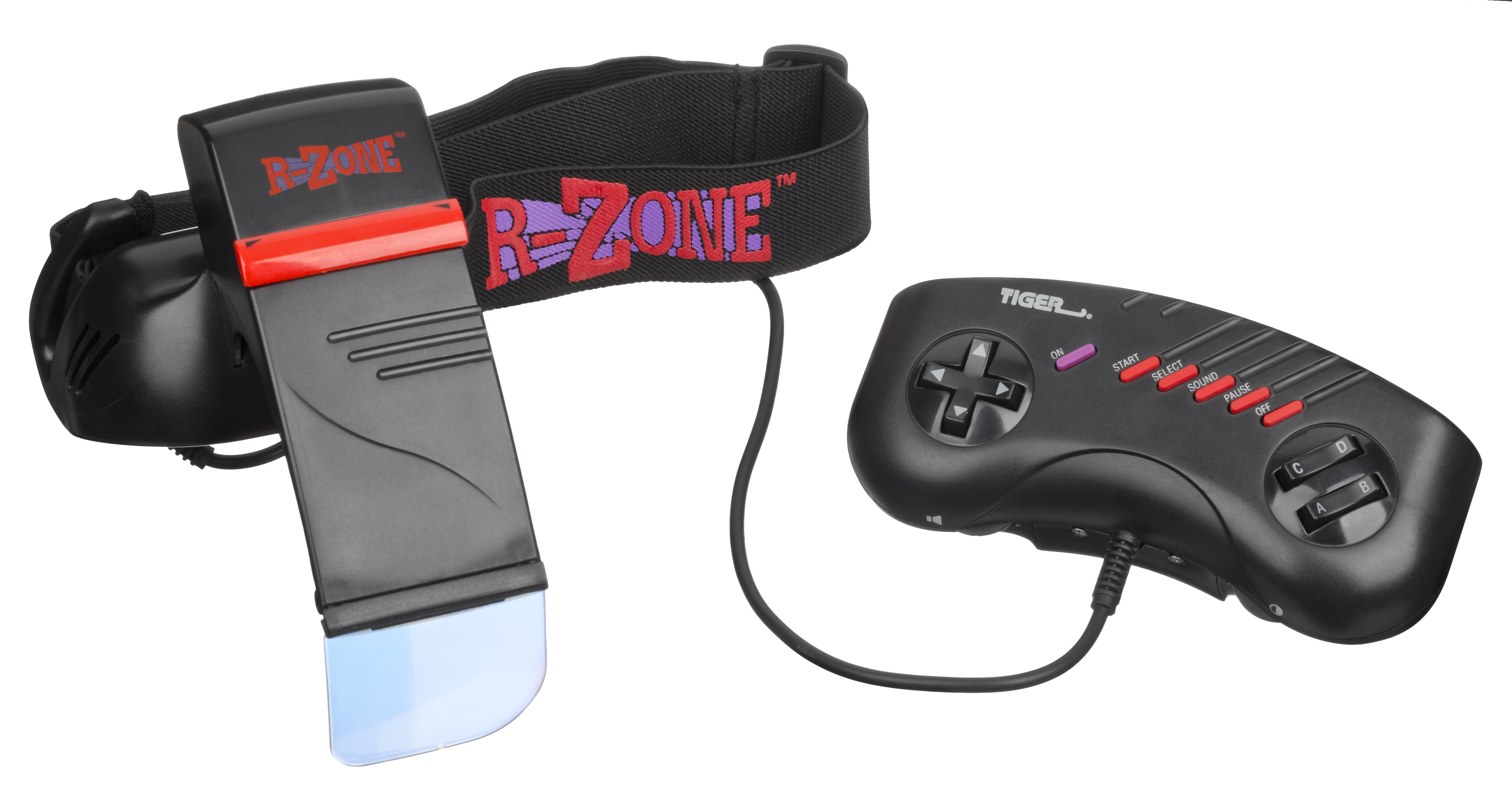
- Original R-Zone Headgear model
- Manufacturer: Tiger Electronics
- Type: Handheld game console
- Generation: Fifth generation
- Released: 1995
- Discontinued: 1997
- Media: ROM cartridges
- Predecessor: Quiz Wiz
- Successor: Game.com

The R-Zone is a portable game console (originally head-worn, later handheld) developed and manufactured by Tiger Electronics. The R-Zone was shown at the American International Toy Fair in February 1995, and was released later that year. The R-Zone was panned by critics, and was also a commercial disaster, with its lifespan lasting only two years before being discontinued in 1997. Although the R-Zone was not designed to compete directly with any other handhelds, it marked Tiger Electronics' first multi-game entry into the portable electronic game market.

The original R-Zone unit consists of a headset and a separate controller containing batteries. Each game cartridge has its own transparent LCD screen which is projected onto a mirrored surface held in front of the player's eye. It is thought that this original design, including the red color scheme, was designed to capitalize on popular buzz for the Nintendo Virtual Boy at the time. However, Tiger has never confirmed this theory.

Three additional versions of the R-Zone were subsequently released: the R-Zone SuperScreen, the XPG (Xtreme Pocket Game), and the DataZone. It has been constantly regarded as one of the worst video game consoles ever made.

== Games ==
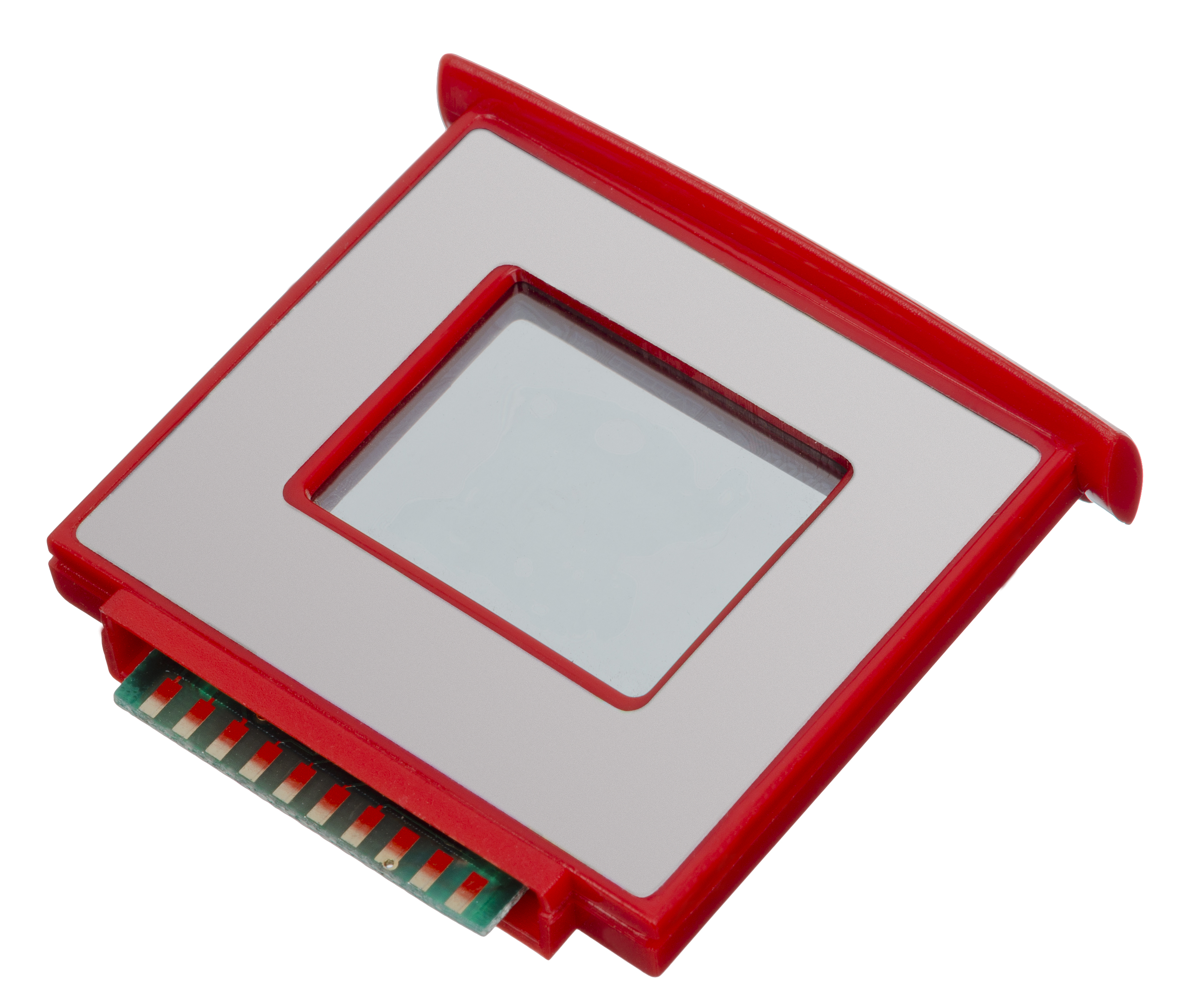
The game cartridges contained clear LCD screens that the R-Zone projected.

R-Zone games mostly vary only in title and subject; gameplay within the R-Zone's gaming library is almost identical from title to title. As with Tiger's other gaming units, the software lineup is dominated by licensed titles. Games released for the console include Batman Forever, Virtua Fighter, Mortal Kombat 3, VR Troopers, Indy 500, Star Wars, Men in Black, and The Lost World: Jurassic Park. This is a partial list:

- A Bug's Life (cancelled)
- Alien vs Predator (cancelled)
- Apollo 13
- Area 51
- Batman & Robin
- Batman Forever
- Battle Arena Toshinden
- Daytona USA
- Football (France exclusive)
- Godzilla (cancelled)
- Independence Day
- Indy 500
- Judge Dredd
- The Lost World: Jurassic Park
- Mask of Zorro (UK exclusive, pack-in only. Also sold in the Netherlands.)
- Men in Black
- Mortal Kombat 3
- Mortal Kombat Trilogy
- Nights into Dreams
- Panzer Dragoon
- Primal Rage
- Road Rash 3
- Sonic R (cancelled)
- Star Trek (cancelled)
- Star Wars: Imperial Assault
- Star Wars: Jedi Adventure
- Star Wars: Millennium Falcon Challenge
- Star Wars: Rebel Forces
- Virtua Cop
- Virtua Fighter
- Virtua Fighter 2
- VR Troopers: When Worlds Collide

== Hardware ==
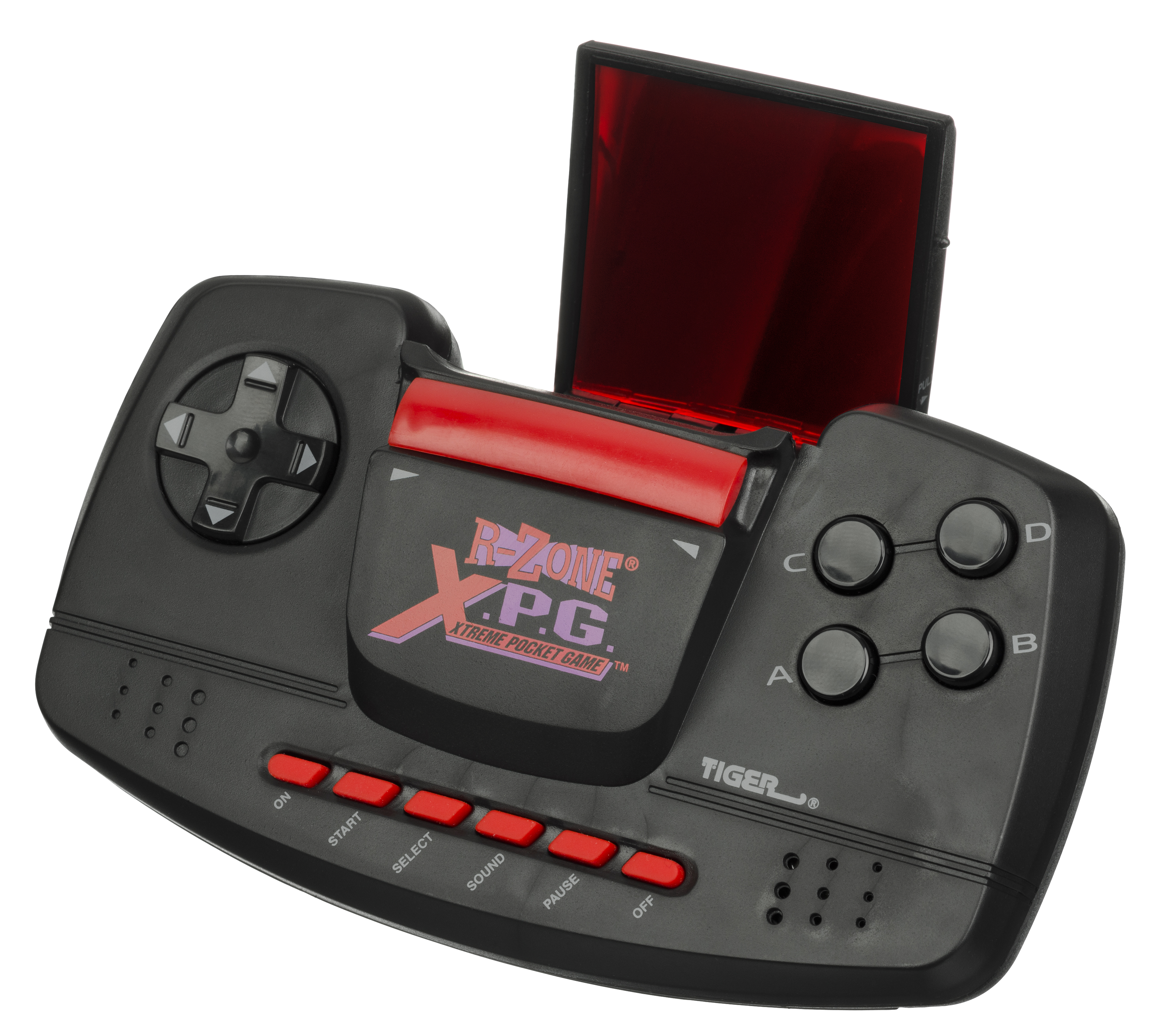
The R-Zone XPG (Xtreme Pocket Game) model

The R-Zone has ten face buttons. The buttons on the right are labeled "A", "B", "C", and "D". The functions of these face buttons vary from game to game but typically the buttons correspond to a four-direction attack scheme (where the "C" button attacks to the left, the "D" button attacks up, the "B" button attacks right, and the "A" button attacks down or does nothing at all). The buttons on the bottom are labeled "ON", "START", "SELECT", "SOUND", "PAUSE", and "OFF". The functions of these face buttons are universal and do not vary from game-to-game. The "ON" button simply turns on the console but is largely un-used as inserting a game cartridge automatically turns the unit on. The "START" button is required to begin all games. The "SOUND" button toggles the audio on and off. The "PAUSE" button allows for any game to be paused. The "OFF" button turns the console off.

The R-Zone also features a directional pad, allowing four directions of movement in its games.

The R-Zone has no microprocessor or memory. Those components are contained in a microcontroller inside the game cartridge. The console itself acts as a front polarizer for the LCD, a Speaker, and a shift register for the controls.

The R-Zone game cartridges are transparent in the center. This allows light to pass through and reflect off a specialized mirror to the gamer's eyes. The LCD in each cartridge operates identically to Tiger's earlier handheld LCD game units. All of the graphics were pre-drawn and permanently set into the LCD itself. Different portions of the display are darkened/activated at different times to provide animation.

The mirror has minor tilt adjustment and can be pushed up against the unit for protection and storage. The games only display a dark red color.

The bottom side of the console shows two ports (one on the left side, the other on the right). Each port is accessible with a screwdriver and holds the batteries.

A single speaker allows for mono audio output.

== Variations ==
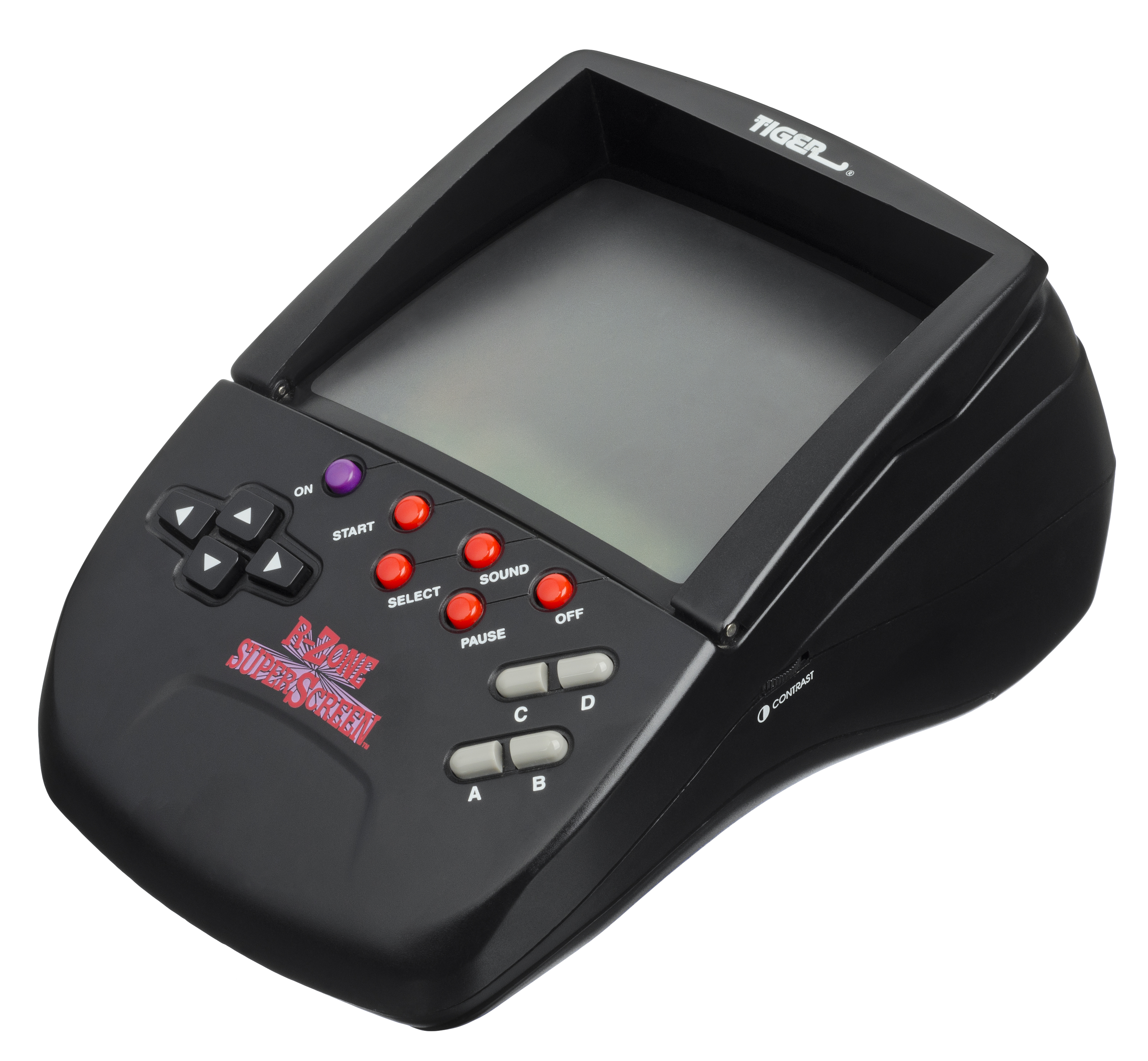
The R-Zone SuperScreen model, which used lighted rear-projection

A few variations of the R-Zone were produced:

- The R-Zone Headgear was released in late 1995 and is largely different from later units in that the game cartridge is inserted into a device that is strapped onto the user's head. The user flips down a transparent lens that was designed to reflect the game images into the user's right eye. The head unit holds the game being played and is connected to a controller with a cable approximately 2.5 feet (0.76 m) long. The controller requires 4 AAA batteries and sports a cartridge storage slot (for keeping an additional game protected and available), volume adjustment dial, and brightness adjustment dial. The console was priced $29.99 at launch and included a pack-in game.
- The R-Zone SuperScreen was released in late 1996 and initially cost $29.99. It notably allowed R-Zone games to show colors. Some games allow for a special lens to be used with this particular R-Zone and simply provide the user with a non-animated color background. Game movement on screen is black. The screen is considerably larger than the other R-Zone models; because of this, and the fact that the user is not required to look at a mirror at a precise angle to see the gameplay, other people can also see gameplay. The unit changed the layout again and requires 4 D batteries to run. In this model the D-pad was swapped out for four directional buttons (up, down, left, and right).
- The R-Zone DataZone was released in late 1996. It is another handheld version of the console, but includes a data organizer. It no longer projects the image through a mirror but rather just flat displays it with a backlight. It uses one watch battery to store data and 2 AAA batteries to run the games.
- The R-Zone XPG (short for Xtreme Pocket Game) is a completely handheld version of the console, released in 1997. It lacks a headset, and instead projects the display onto a mirrored surface directly above the game controller area on the unit. This version also uses AAA batteries.

== Reception ==
The console was panned by critics upon its release. At the time of its release, David Jones of the Chicago Tribune called the R-Zone "a waste of time and money" and wrote that its screen "is hard to see and the controls are very awkward. That's not all – if you keep the headband on for, say, five minutes, you'll have two deep lines on your forehead and a headache." Jones noted the failure of the R-Zone's extra headband padding – which was designed to prevent pain – and concluded, "the R-Zone should be dumped into the trash can where it belongs." Electronic Gaming Monthly remarked that while the display takes time to get used to and is not "even in the same league as the Virtual Boy's immersive experience," the R-Zone is much less expensive and, unlike the Virtual Boy, is functionally portable.

In 2008, Mikel Reparaz of GamesRadar+ included the R-Zone on a list of the 10 worst game consoles released up to that time. Reparaz considered the R-Zone to be a poor version of Nintendo's Virtual Boy and stated that it was essentially "just a gimmicky version of the same awful, clicky-beepy LCD games that Tiger had been dumping on the market since the '80s."

In 2016, Motherboard called the R-Zone "perhaps the most infamous product ever associated with Tiger", stating that the console's games were "glorified versions" of Tiger's LCD games. Motherboard stated that the R-Zone was similar to the Virtual Boy in some ways, but considered the R-Zone to be "much, much worse".
