= Sega Rally =

- Genre: Racing
- Developers: Sega AM5 (1995–1999); Sega (2006); Sega Racing Studio (2007–2008)
- Publisher: Sega
- Platforms: Arcade; Dreamcast; Game Boy Advance; J2ME; N-Gage; PlayStation 2 PlayStation 3 PlayStation Portable; Sega Saturn; Windows; Xbox 360
- First release: Sega Rally Championship; February 1995
- Latest release: Sega Rally Online Arcade; May 18, 2011

Sega Rally is a series of 3D racing video games published by Sega. The first game in the series, Sega Rally Championship, was developed by Sega AM3 and released in arcades in 1995. Later games were developed by Sega and Sega Racing Studio.

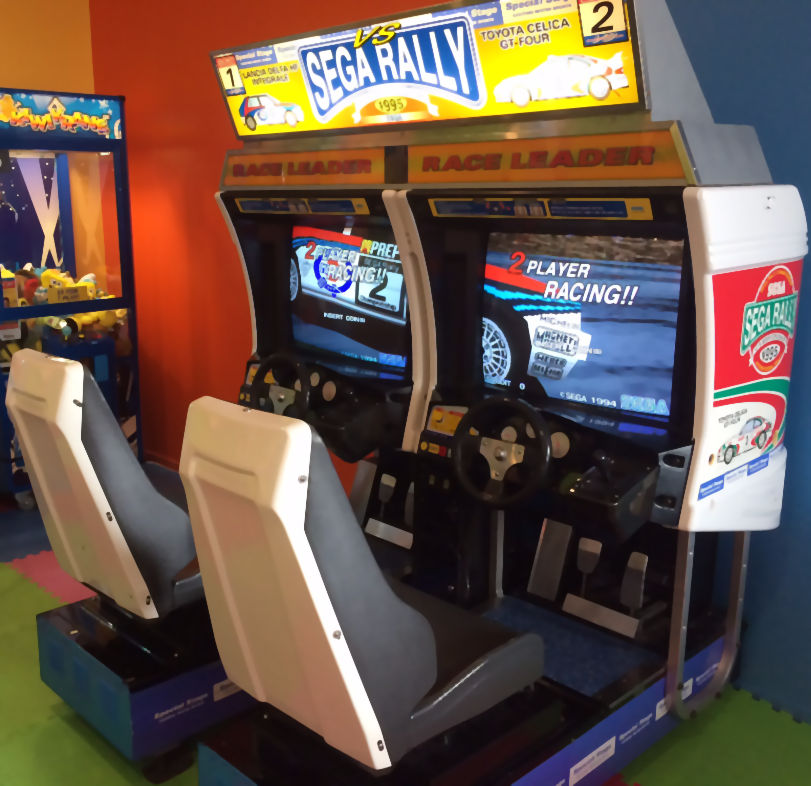
2 Player version of Sega Rally. Up to four can be linked for multiplayer racing, and a fifth unit added to show the action from external perspectives.

== Installments ==
There have been five games released in the Sega Rally series. Two games were developed by Sega AM3, one was developed by Sega, and two were developed by Sega Racing Studio. The original game, designed by Tetsuya Mizuguchi, was released on the Model 2 board and became very popular in the arcades, later receiving a port to the Sega Saturn.

This port was of excellent quality, running in smooth 30 frames per second (25 fps on European PAL systems) and looking very much like the arcade original. Exceptions included non-transparent windows since the Saturn could not generate transparencies in 3D graphics, draw distance shorter than in the arcade game, and lower resolution. A Windows port using on DirectX followed about a year later. The biggest difference between the original and its home versions is the option to drive three laps on each of the four implemented tracks instead of only one lap. Good players could also unlock an extra car: the Lancia Stratos.

Sega Rally Championship 2 was released on the Model 3 board and was ported to Dreamcast in November 1998, making it one of the first Japanese Dreamcast games available. However, the Dreamcast version suffered from an unstable frame rate and wasn't as successful as its predecessor. The arcade original featured only four courses, while the port had between one and three courses for each of the five implemented environments, all wrapped up in a 10-year championship. Again, a PC port followed. Sega Rally Championship 2 on DC and PC featured a lot of tuning options for the cars, including choice of tires and suspension, which could not be found in the arcades.

Sega Rally 3 was released in 2008 and is a condensed version of Sega Rally Revo for Xbox 360, PS3 and PC. This time the port went the other way around. Sega Rally 3 was released as Sega Rally Online Arcade for Xbox 360 and PS3 in 2011 and came full circle from consoles to arcades and back again.

Mobile phone titles were also released: on the N-Gage, and also a Java version developed by Rockpool Games.

A Nintendo DS version was pitched, but was cancelled. A prototype of the game was found on May 20, 2026.

=== Released titles ===
All games of the Sega Rally-series by system
Title	Year	Arcade	PC	PS3	X360	PSP	PS2	DC	SAT	N-Gage	J2ME	GBA
Sega Rally Championship	1995	✓	✓	✗	✗	✗	✓	✗	✓	✓	✗	✓
Sega Rally 2	1998/1999	✓	✓	✗	✗	✗	✗	✓	✗	✗	✗	✗
Sega Rally 2006^{a}	2006	✗	✗	✗	✗	✗	✓ ^{b}	✗	✗	✗	✗	✗
Sega Rally Revo	2007	✗	✓	✓	✓	✓	✗	✗	✗	✗	✗	✗
Sega Rally 3D	2007	✗	✗	✗	✗	✗	✗	✗	✗	✗	✓	✗
Sega Rally 3 / Sega Rally Online Arcade	2008/2011^{b}	✓	✗	✓	✓	✗	✗	✗	✗	✗	✗	✗

^a Released only in Japan and South Korea
^b Not released in Japan
