= Game.com =

Handheld game console

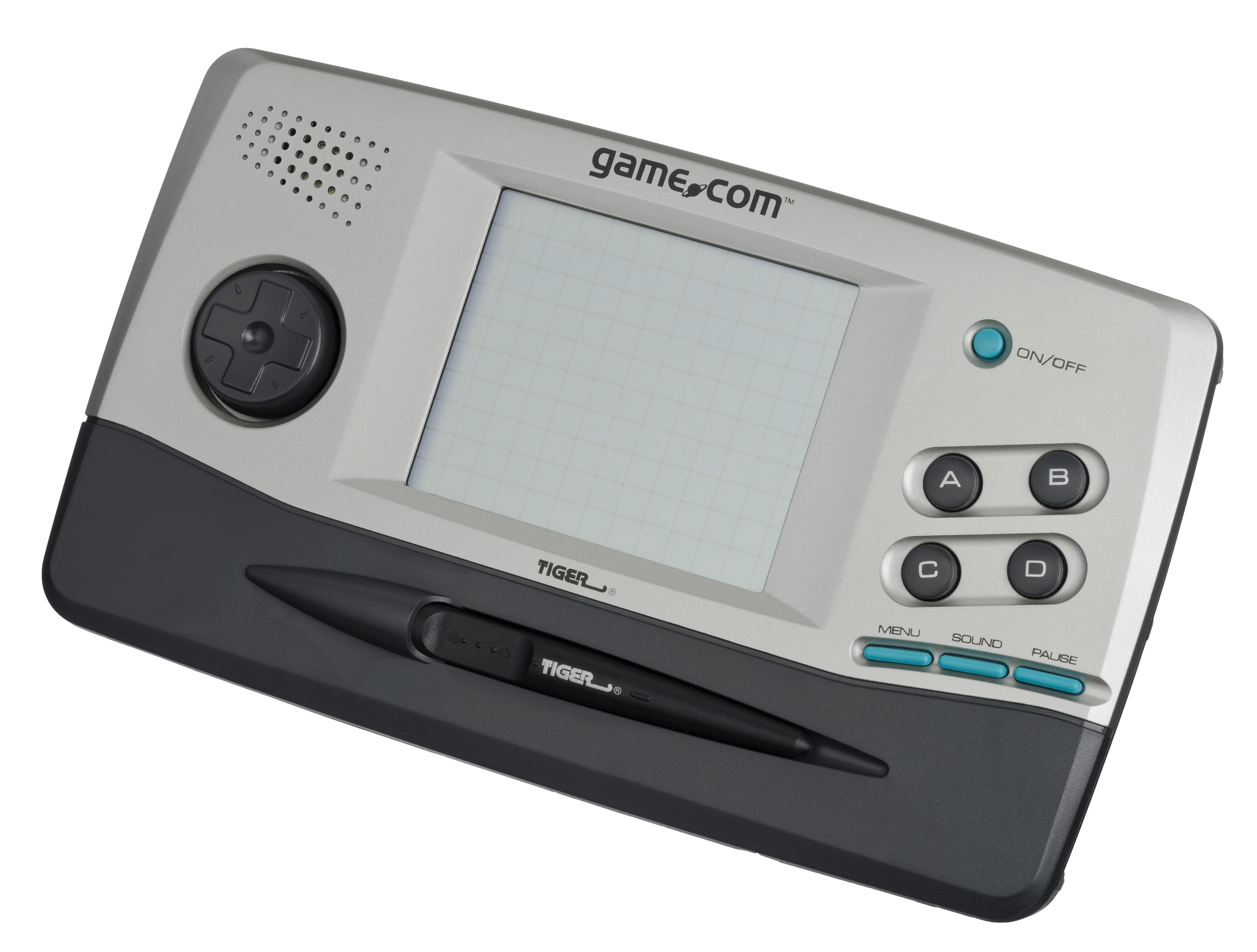
- The original Game.com system
- Manufacturer: Tiger Electronics
- Type: Handheld game console
- Generation: Fifth
- Released: Game.com: US: September 12, 1997; UK: Q4 1997; Game.com Pocket Pro: US: May/June 1999
- Lifespan: 1997–2000
- Introductory price: $69.95 (original model); $29.99 (Pocket Pro)
- Discontinued: 2000
- Units sold: Fewer than 300,000
- Media: ROM cartridge
- CPU: Sharp SM8521 @ 10 MHz
- Display: 200 x 160px 4-bit greyscale
- Sound: Two 4-bit waveform generators, noise generator, 8-bit PCM channel
- Input: Digital D-pad; 8× digital buttons (A, B, C, D, Menu, Sound, Pause, On/Off); Touchscreen
- Connectivity: Compete.com serial cable, 14.4 kbit/s modem
- Power: 4 × AA batteries or optional AC adapter (original model); 2 x AA batteries (Pocket Pro)

The Game.com (Note: Styled as "game.com", but pronounced "game com" rather than "game dot com".) is a fifth-generation handheld game console developed and released by Tiger Electronics on September 12, 1997. Designed as a multimedia device for older audiences, it aimed to combine gaming with early digital functions such as touchscreen input and limited Internet connectivity. The original model features a monochrome touchscreen, dual cartridge slots, and could be connected to a 14.4 kbit/s modem for access to e-mail and basic web functions via a proprietary interface. Its name is a reference to the .com top-level domain, reflecting its Internet-related features. It was the first game console to include a touchscreen and the first handheld to offer Internet connectivity, positioning it as an early forerunner in multifunctional handheld gaming devices.

Despite its innovations, the system struggled commercially due to a small game library and technical limitations, prompting a redesign in the form of the Game.com Pocket Pro, a smaller version that lacked Internet capabilities except high score submitting. Due to poor sales, the Game.com console line was discontinued in 2000, having sold fewer than 300,000 units.

== History ==
Tiger Electronics had previously introduced its R-Zone game console in 1995 – as a competitor to Nintendo's Virtual Boy – but the system was a failure. Prior to the R-Zone, Tiger had also manufactured handheld games consisting of LCD screens with imprinted graphics.

=== Original version ===
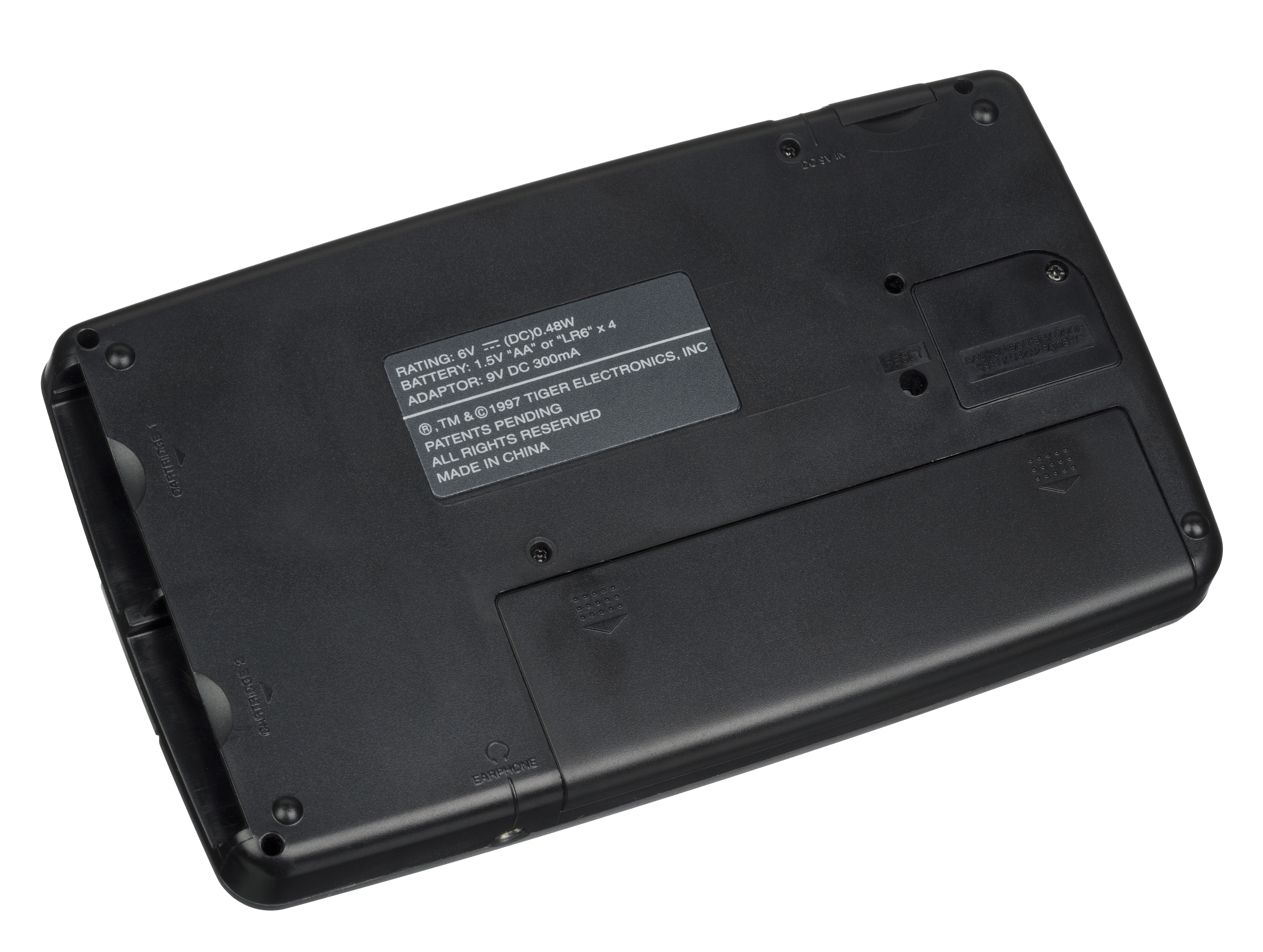
The back of the original Game.com console

By February 1997, Tiger was planning to release a new game console as a direct competitor to Nintendo's Game Boy. Prior to its release, Tiger Electronics stated that the Game.com would "change the gaming world as we know it", while a spokesperson stated that it would be "one of this summer's hits". The Game.com, the only new game console of the year, was on display at the Electronic Entertainment Expo (E3) in May 1997, with sales expected to begin in July. Dennis Lynch of the Chicago Tribune considered the Game.com to be the "most interesting hand-held device" on display at E3, describing it as a "sort of Game Boy for adults".

The Game.com was released in the United States on September 12, 1997, with a retail price of $69.95, while an Internet-access cartridge was scheduled for release in October. Lights Out was included with the console as a pack-in game and Solitaire was built into the handheld itself. The console's release marked Tiger's largest product launch ever. Tiger also launched a website for the system at the domain "game.com". The Game.com was marketed with a television commercial in which a spokesperson insults gamers who ask questions about the console, while stating that it "plays more games than you idiots have brain cells"; GamesRadar stated that the advertisement "probably didn't help matters much". By the end of 1997, the console had been released in the United Kingdom, at a retail price of £79.99.

The Game.com came in a black-and-white color, and featured a design similar to Sega's Game Gear console. The screen is larger than the Game Boy's and has higher resolution. The Game.com included a phone directory, a calculator, and a calendar, and had an older target audience with its PDA features. Tiger designed the console's features to be simple and cheap. The device was powered by four AA batteries, and an optional AC adapter was also available. One of the major peripherals that Tiger produced for the system was the compete.com serial cable, allowing players to connect their consoles to play multiplayer games. The console includes two game cartridge slots. In addition to reducing the need to swap out cartridges, this enabled Game.com games to include online elements, since both a game cartridge and the modem cartridge could be inserted at the same time.

The Game.com was the first video game console to feature a touchscreen and also the first handheld video game console to have Internet connectivity. The Game.com's black-and-white monochrome touchscreen measures approximately one and a half inches by two inches, and is divided into square zones that are imprinted onto the screen itself, to aid players in determining where to apply the stylus. The touchscreen lacks a backlight. The Game.com was also the first handheld gaming console to have internal memory, which is used to save information such as high scores and contact information.

As 1998 opened, the Game.com was considered the only remaining viable competitor for the Game Boy, and Tiger planned to emphasize the Game.com's internet capabilities in marketing, as well as release new games based on major films and Giga Pets.

=== Game.com Pocket Pro ===
Because of poor sales with the original Game.com, Tiger developed an updated version known as the Game.com Pocket Pro. The console was shown at the American International Toy Fair in February 1999, and was later shown along with several future games at E3 in May 1999. The Game.com Pocket Pro had been released by June 1999, with a retail price of $29.99. The new console was available in six different colors: black (backlit model), green, orange, pink, purple, and teal.

Although it lacked color like its predecessor, the Pocket Pro was reduced in size to be equivalent to the Game Boy Pocket. The screen size was also reduced, and the new console featured only one cartridge slot. Unlike the original Game.com, the Pocket Pro required only two AA batteries. The Game.com Pocket Pro included a phone directory, a calendar and a calculator, but lacked Internet capabilities outside high score submitting.

The Game.com Pocket Pro's primary competitor was the Game Boy Color. Despite several games based on popular franchises, the Game.com console line failed to sell in large numbers, and was discontinued in 2000 because of poor sales. The Game.com was a commercial failure, with less than 300,000 units sold, although the idea of a touchscreen would later be used successfully in the Nintendo DS, released in 2004.

== Internet features ==
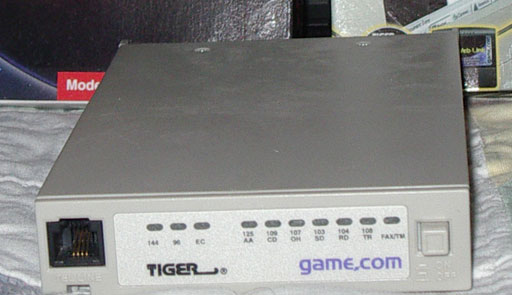
Game.com modem

Accessing the Internet required the use of an Internet cartridge and a dial-up modem, neither of which were included with the console. Email messages could be read and sent on the Game.com using the Internet cartridge, and the Game.com supported text-only web browsing through Internet service providers. Email messages could not be saved to the Game.com's internal memory. In addition to a Game.com-branded 14.4 kbit/s modem, Tiger also offered an Internet service provider through Delphi that was made to work specifically with the Game.com.

Tiger subsequently released the Web Link cartridge, allowing players to connect their system to a desktop computer. Using the Web Link cartridge, players could upload their high scores to the Game.com website for a chance to be listed on a webpage featuring the top high scores. None of the console's games made use of the Internet feature.

== Technical specifications ==
Dimensions (L x W x D)	Original: 190 by 108 by 19 millimetres (7.48 in × 4.25 in × 0.75 in) / Pocket Pro: 140 by 86 by 28 millimetres (5.5 in × 3.4 in × 1.1 in)
Processor chip	Sharp SM8521 8-bit CPU; 10 MHz clock speed
Display resolution	200 x 160, Original: 3.5 in. / Pocket Pro: 2.8 in.
Touchscreen	12 x 10 grid-based touchscreen
Color system	Black and White, with 4 gray levels
Audio	Monaural. Total of four audio channels: two 4-bit waveform generators (each with its own frequency, volume control and waveform data), one noise generator, and one direct 8-bit PCM output channel.
Power source	4 AA batteries (Pocket Pro: 2 AA batteries) or AC adapter
Ports	Serial Comm Port for the compete.com cable, internet cable and weblink cable; 3.5 mm Audio Out Jack for headphones; DC9 V in (AC Adapter); 2 cartridge slots (1 on the Pocket Pro)
Buttons	Power (On/Off); Action (A, B, C, D); 3 Function (Menu, Sound, Pause); 1 Eight-way Directional Pad; Volume; Contrast; Reset (On system's underside)

== Games ==
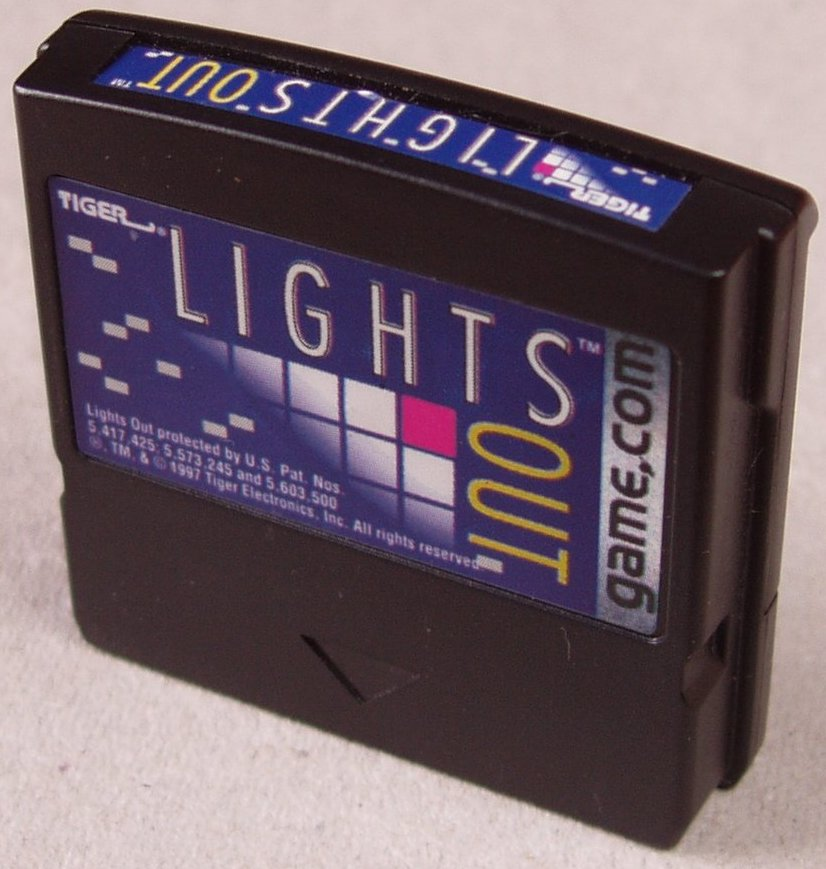
The Lights Out cartridge which came bundled with the console

Several games were available for the Game.com at the time of its 1997 launch, in comparison to hundreds of games available for the Game Boy. Tiger planned to have a dozen games available by the end of 1997, and hoped to have as many as 50 games available in 1998, with all of them to be produced or adapted internally by Tiger. Some third parties expressed interest in developing for the system, but Tiger decided against signing any initially. Tiger secured licenses for several popular game series, including Duke Nukem, Resident Evil, Mortal Kombat, and Sonic the Hedgehog. Game prices initially ranged between $19 and $29. Cartridge size was in the 16 megabit range.

At the time of the Pocket Pro's 1999 release, the Game.com library consisted primarily of games intended for an older audience. Some games that were planned for release in 1999 would be exclusive to Game.com consoles. Game prices at that time ranged from $14 to $30. Twenty games were ultimately released for the Game.com, most of them developed internally by Tiger, in addition to the built-in game Solitaire.

- Solitaire (Built in)
- Batman & Robin
- Centipede
- Duke Nukem 3D
- Fighters Megamix
- Frogger
- Henry
- Indy 500
- Jeopardy!
- Lights Out (Pack in)
- The Lost World: Jurassic Park
- Monopoly
- Mortal Kombat Trilogy
- Quiz Wiz: Cyber Trivia
- Resident Evil 2
- Scrabble
- Sonic Jam
- Tiger Casino
- Wheel of Fortune
- Wheel of Fortune 2
- Williams Arcade Classics

=== Cancelled games ===
The following is a list of games that were announced in various forms or known to be in development for the console but were never released.

- A Bug's Life
- Castlevania: Symphony of the Night
- Command & Conquer: Red Alert
- Deer Hunter
- Holyfield Champion Boxing (planned to include "Real Feel" force feedback in cart)
- Furbyland
- Giga Pets Deluxe
- Godzilla
- Madden 98
- Metal Gear Solid
- Mutoids
- Name That Tune
- NASCAR Racing
- NBA Hangtime
- Shadow Madness
- Small Soldiers
- Turok: Dinosaur Hunter
- WCW Whiplash
- The X-Files

== Reception ==
At the time of the Game.com's launch in 1997, Chris Johnston of VideoGameSpot believed that the console would have difficulty competing against the Game Boy. Johnston also believed that text-based Internet and email would attract only limited appeal, stating that such features were outdated. Johnston concluded that the Game.com "is a decent system, but Nintendo is just way too powerful in the industry." Chip and Jonathan Carter wrote that the console did not play action games as well as it did with other games, although they praised the console's various options and wrote, "Graphically, we'd have to say this has the potential to perform better than Game Boy. As for sound, Game.com delivers better than any other hand-held on the market." A team of four Electronic Gaming Monthly editors gave the Game.com scores of 5.5, 4.5, 5.0, and 4.0. They were impressed by the PDA features and touchscreen, but commented that the games library had thus far failed to deliver on the Game.com's great potential. They elaborated that while the non-scrolling games, particularly Wheel of Fortune, were great fun and made good use of the touchscreen, the more conventional action games were disappointing and suffered from prominent screen blurring.

Dave Becker of the Wisconsin State Journal stated that the Game.com offered "some serious" advantages over the Game Boy, including its touchscreen. It was also stated that in comparison to the Game Boy, the Game.com's 8-bit processor provided "marginal improvements" in the quality of speed and graphics. The newspaper noted that the Game.com had a "tiny, somewhat blurry screen". The Philadelphia Inquirer wrote a negative review of the Game.com, particularly criticizing Internet connectivity issues. Also criticized was the system's lack of a backlit screen, as the use of exterior lighting could cause difficulty in viewing the screen, which was highly reflective.

Steven L. Kent, writing for the Chicago Tribune, wrote that although the console had an elegant design, as well as better sound and a higher-definition screen than the Game Boy, these qualities "[have] not translated into ideal game play. Though Tiger has produced fighting, racing and shooting games for Game.com, the games have noticeably slow frame rates. The racing game looks like a flickering silent picture show." Cameron Davis of VideoGames.com wrote, "Sure, this is no Game Boy Color-killer, but the Game.Com was never meant to be. To deride it by comparing it with more powerful and established formats would be a bit unfair". Davis also wrote, "The touch screen is pretty sensitive, but it works well – you won't need more than a few seconds to get used to it." However, he criticized the screen's squared zones: "more often than not it proves distracting when you are playing games that don't require it."

GamePro criticized the Pocket Pro's lack of screen color and its difficult controls, but considered its two best qualities to be its cheap price and a game library of titles exclusive to the console. The Philadelphia Inquirer also criticized the Pocket Pro's lack of a color screen, as well as "frustrating" gameplay caused by the "unresponsive" controls, including the stylus. The newspaper stated that, "Even at $29.99, the pocket.pro is no bargain."

=== Legacy ===
Brett Alan Weiss of the website AllGame wrote, "The Game.com, the little system that (almost) could, constantly amazes me with the strength and scope of its sound effects. [...] It's astounding what power comes out of such a tiny little speaker." In 2004, Kent included the modem and "some PDA functionality" as the console's strengths, while listing its "Slow processor" and "lackluster library of games" as weaknesses. In 2006, Engadget stated that "You can't fault Tiger Electronics for their ambition", but wrote that the Game.com "didn't do any one thing particularly well", criticizing its text-only Internet access and stating that its "disappointing games were made even worse" by the "outdated" screen.

In 2009, PC World ranked the Game.com at number nine on its list of the 10 worst video game systems ever released, criticizing its Internet aspect, its game library, its low-resolution touchscreen, and its "Silly name that attempted to capitalize on Internet mania." However, PC World positively noted its "primitive" PDA features and its solitaire game, which the magazine named as the system's best game. In 2011, Mikel Reparaz of GamesRadar ranked the Game.com at number 3 on a list of 7 failed handheld consoles, writing that while the Game.com had several licensed games, it "doesn't actually mean much when they all look like cruddy, poorly animated Game Boy ports." Raparaz also stated that the Game.com "looked dated even by Game Boy standards", noting that the Game Boy Pocket had a sharper display screen. Reparaz stated that the Game.com's continuation into 2000 was a "pretty significant achievement" considering its competition from the Game Boy Color.

In 2013, Jeff Dunn of GamesRadar criticized the Game.com for its "blurry" and "imprecise" touchscreen, as well as its "limited and unwieldy" Internet and email interfaces. Dunn also criticized the "painful" Internet setup process, and stated that all of the console's available games were "ugly and horrible". Dunn noted, however, that the Game.com's Internet aspect was a "smart" feature. In 2016, Motherboard stated that the Game.com was "perhaps one of the worst consoles of all time", due largely to its low screen quality. In 2018, Nadia Oxford of USgamer noted the Game.com's "paper-thin" library of games and stated that the console "died in record time because it was poorly-made, to say the least." A working prototype of the unreleased Game.com port of Castlevania: Symphony of the Night was discovered and released online in 2022. Nick Thorpe of Retro Gamer called the prototype "considerably more ambitious than the majority of Game.com games", believing it could have been one of the system's better games had time allowed it to be finished.
