= The Lost World: Jurassic Park (handheld game) =

1997 video game

- Game Boy cover art
- Developers: Aspect (Game Gear); Tiger (Game.com); Torus (Game Boy)
- Publishers: Sega (Game Gear); Tiger (Game.com and R-Zone); THQ (Game Boy)
- Director: Katsuhiro Hasegawa (Game Gear)
- Producer: Makoto Oshitani (Game Gear)
- Composer: Kojiro Mikusa (Game Gear)
- Series: Jurassic Park
- Platforms: Game Boy, Game Gear, Game.com, R-Zone
- Release: Game Boy: NA: December 1997; EU: 1997; Game.com: NA: Fall 1997; Game Gear: NA: August 26, 1997; R-Zone: NA: 1997
- Genre: Action
- Mode: Single-player

The Lost World: Jurassic Park is the title of several different video games released for handheld video game consoles in 1997. Four versions, each with their own gameplay variations, were developed and published by various companies for the Sega Game Gear, Nintendo's Game Boy, and Tiger Electronics' game.com and R-Zone consoles. Each version is based on the 1997 film of the same name.

== Gameplay ==
The Game Gear, Game Boy and game.com versions feature side-scrolling platform-based gameplay.

In the Game Gear version, several organizations have sent hunting teams to Isla Sorna to capture the island's dinosaurs and sell them. The player controls a hunter, who is sent to investigate the current state of the island, and to prevent the hunting teams from achieving their goal. Twelve levels are featured, each one accessed by a world map. In two of the game's later levels, the player plays as a Compsognathus rather than the hunter.

In the Game Boy version, the player's unnamed character must prevent smugglers from removing the island's dinosaurs. The game features eight levels, including jungles and a laboratory. The player's character must collect 10 objects in each level, such as dinosaur eggs, data discs, and DNA vials. The game includes a password feature, and is compatible with the Super Game Boy.

In the game.com version, the player chooses to play as either Sarah Harding or Roland Tembo. Tembo is a hunter who wants to collect dinosaur eggs and take them off the island; Harding must collect the eggs before Tembo. The game features six levels, each one divided into two sections: Game Trail and Nest Area. Each level begins with a Game Trail section, which is a three-dimensional driving mini-game. The player chooses a vehicle, such as a motorcycle or Humvee. The player must then avoid stampeding dinosaurs and road hazards such as bushes and rocks while driving forward on a road of either dirt, grass or gravel. Nest Area, the second portion of each level, plays as a side-scroller in which the player's character must avoid dinosaurs while searching for five eggs and attempting to reach the end of the level. At the end of each level is a mother dinosaur that must be defeated. Both characters use tranquilizer darts against the dinosaurs. In addition, both characters also possess their own weapon.

In the R-Zone version, the player must survive against Tyrannosaurus rex, Triceratops, and Velociraptor in various jungle island levels. The player can use a motorcycle and all-terrain vehicle.

== Development and release ==
In June 1997, THQ announced that it had obtained the rights to publish a video game adaptation of The Lost World: Jurassic Park, to be released for the Game Boy handheld console in October 1997. Later that month at the Electronic Entertainment Expo (E3), Sega announced that a separate video game adaptation of the film would be developed for the handheld Sega Game Gear console. The Game Gear version, developed by Aspect and published by Sega, was released on August 26, 1997.

By December 1997, Tiger Electronics had developed and published their own Lost World video game for their game.com handheld console. Tiger also released a version of the game for their R-Zone handheld console in 1997. THQ's version, developed by Torus Games, was released in December 1997.

== Reception ==
Reception

Review scores
Publication	Score
AllGame	2.5/5 (Game.com)
Nintendo Power	4.5/10 (Game Boy)
The Electric Playground	6.5/10 (Game Boy)

Nintendo Power, reviewing the Game Boy version, criticized the game's dinosaur and human characters for seeming "overly small." Nintendo Power wrote that the game was unnecessarily awkward because of "poor hit detection and delayed trigger actions while using weapons." Nintendo Power criticized the "Very standard" sound effects and music, but complimented the "nice addition" of a password feature, and ultimately concluded that the game "gives players an easy-to-grasp game world for some Jurassic fun. Once you get beyond the control issue, The Lost World can provide a nice escape."

Victor Lucas of The Electric Playground reviewed the Game Boy version and stated that he was impressed with the game despite it being "far from the quality you'd find in a Nintendo developed platform game for the Game Boy". Lucas praised the game for its variety of dinosaurs, but criticized its simple musical score and "irritating" Compsognathus enemies. Lucas also noted that there was "slippery-slidiness involved in coming to a complete stop. There will be plenty of times that you'll overstep a nasty ledge because of this. The fact that your character can grab and hang onto these ledges is a definite plus in the control department, however."

Brett Alan Weiss of AllGame praised the graphical detail and design of the Game.com version, but wrote that the "over-abundance of graphical content can get in the way of the action. The foreground dinosaurs oftentimes blend in with some of the shorter trees, especially when the playfield is scrolling, and the busy backgrounds only add to the confusion.[...] Even if the graphics don't confuse you, it is hard to keep the dinosaurs from killing you." Weiss praised the game's sound effects, but criticized its "wimpy" music, calling it "lightweight for a game of this type." Weiss considered the game's action to be mediocre, and criticized the poor controls, while stating that the driving levels "are largely pointless, but they look good and they are a change of pace from the standard gameplay."

== See also ==
- Jurassic Park video games
- The Lost World: Jurassic Park (video game), a listing of games based on The Lost World: Jurassic Park
