= Virtua Fighter 2 =

1994 video game

- Japanese arcade flyer
- Developers: Sega AM2; Gaibrain, Success, Data East (Sega Genesis)
- Publisher: Sega
- Director: Yu Suzuki
- Producer: Yu Suzuki
- Programmer: Toru Ikebuchi
- Artist: Kazuhiro Izaki
- Composers: Takenobu Mitsuyoshi; Takayuki Nakamura; Akiko Hashimoto
- Series: Virtua Fighter
- Platforms: Arcade, Sega Saturn, Genesis/Mega Drive, R-Zone, Windows, PlayStation 2, iOS, PlayStation 3, Xbox 360
- Release: November 1994: Arcade; JP: November 1994; EU: December 1994; NA: January 1995 Saturn; NA: November 30, 1995; JP: December 1, 1995; KOR: 1995; UK: January 5, 1996; EU: January 1996 Genesis/Mega Drive; NA: November 21, 1996; EU: November 28, 1996 Windows; JP: September 5, 1997; NA: September 17, 1997; EU: September 18, 1997 PlayStation 2; JP: October 14, 2004 iOS; WW: January 20, 2011 PlayStation 3; NA: November 27, 2012; JP: November 28, 2012; EU: December 5, 2012 Xbox 360; WW: November 28, 2012
- Genre: Fighting
- Modes: Single-player, multiplayer
- Arcade system: Model2 A-CRX

Virtua Fighter 2 (Japanese: バーチャファイター2, Hepburn: Bācha Faitā Tsū) is a 1994 fighting game developed and published by Sega for arcades. It is the second game in the Virtua Fighter series and the sequel to Virtua Fighter (1993). Created by Sega's Yu Suzuki-headed AM2 team, it was designed on the purpose-made Sega Model 2 hardware, which provided a significant upgrade in graphical capabilities. Following its release in arcades, Virtua Fighter 2 was ported to the Sega Saturn in November 1995, while ports for other platforms appeared later.

Virtua Fighter 2 was critically acclaimed for its gameplay and breakthrough graphics; it introduced the use of texture-mapped 3D characters, and was one of the first video games to use motion capture animation technology. It became a major arcade hit, selling more than 40,000 arcade units worldwide, and becoming one of Sega's best-selling arcade games of all time. The Saturn version was also well-received for its graphics and gameplay, becoming a blockbuster hit in Japan and selling relatively well in other markets, with more than 2 million units. The game was succeeded by Virtua Fighter 3 in 1996.

== Gameplay ==
Screenshot of the arcade version, showcasing a match between Sarah and Lau

Virtua Fighter 2 is a 3D 1v1 fighting game, similar in concept to other games of the series. Players select a character and attempt to use that character to overcome a series of opponents. This can be done by simply knocking the other character out (by dealing enough damage), or by knocking them out of the square "ring" where the fights occur. Each fight takes place over many rounds; typically, 3 rounds in a best-of-3 approach (though this can be varied). The game is played with an eight-way stick to control character movement, and three buttons (guard, punch, and kick), which are used in various motions to pull off a character's signature attacks.

The arena size could be adjusted to a tiny platform or 82 meters (269 feet). This is the only game in the series—other than Virtua Fighter Remix—that could have such size adjustments. The physical energy meter could also be adjusted to infinity, giving the player the advantage when beating opponents or practicing moves against the computer player. Adjusting the arena to a smaller size and giving the characters infinite health could lead to mock sumo matches, wherein victory is achieved by knocking the other player's character out of the ring.

Each character has their fighting style, loosely based on various real-world fighting methods, such as wrestling or eastern styles. Each character has many unique moves; however, like in the original Virtua Fighter, many characters share many moves with another character (for instance, Lau Chan and Pai Chan each practice similar forms of Kung Fu). In addition, the entire roster of characters shares certain moves and functions; for instance, every character has a basic throw that can be executed by pressing the guard and punch buttons simultaneously. The number and variety of attacks possessed by each character have also been expanded, including counter-attacks and the ability to prevent throws (with rapid reactions required on the player's part).

All nine characters from the original Virtua Fighter are once again playable in Virtua Fighter 2. The sequel also adds two new characters: Shun Di, an old drunken fist master from China, and Lion Rafale, the French son of a wealthy businessman who uses praying mantis style kung fu. Additionally, Shun and Lion have the unique ability to perform "axis strikes," in which they would move around other characters' attacks, accentuating the game's 3D nature.

== Plot ==
Virtua Fighter 2 presents no narrative in game; there is no story-based intro sequence, no narrative character endings, and very little text to supply much of a plot. However, the game was given a story in its supporting material, such as the manual for the Sega Saturn version.

Virtua Fighter 2 hinges around a fighting tournament, where the greatest fighters in the world seek to compete for fame and glory. However, the tournament is organised by the sinister "J6" syndicate, who intend to use the information gathered to perfect their fighting cyborg "Dural" (the game's boss, who uses a move-set made up of other character's moves).

== Development ==
=== Arcade version ===
The game took Sega AM2 a year to develop. The game's head developer was Yu Suzuki. For Virtua Fighter 2, he wanted to introduce texture mapping to the characters, who lacked textures in the original game. However, the Sega Model 1 arcade system lacked texture mapping hardware, so the Sega Model 2 system was developed for the game. To render the game's texture-mapped characters, it cost $2 million ($4.5 million adjusted for inflation) to purchase a texture-mapping graphics processor from the military flight simulation firm Lockheed Martin. Suzuki convinced Sega to purchase the chip, which his team then adapted into a much cheaper processor for video game use in the Model 2 hardware.

The game used advanced motion capture animation, with technology similar to that used in the healthcare and military industries, and was capable of magnetic motion capture to track head movements. Other improvements over its predecessor include a framerate of 60 FPS, new fighting arenas, two new characters, 500 new moves, and 1,200 motion patterns (compared to 700 patterns in the original).

In a 1995 interview, Suzuki said Virtua Fighter 2 was his favorite of all the games he had made, elaborating that he was particularly pleased with the way the polygonal graphics "added a sense of reality" to the characters' motions, and the addition of counterattacks. The developers designed four new characters, only two of which, Lion and Shun, made it into the final game.

=== Saturn version ===
At the beginning of 1995, Sega AM2's Sega Saturn division was split into three sub-departments, each one charged with porting a different arcade game to the Saturn: Virtua Fighter 2, Virtua Cop, and Daytona USA. Due to unexpectedly slow progress in the Daytona USA port, many members of the Virtua Fighter 2 team were reassigned to Daytona USA. In March, AM2 Research completed the Sega Graphics Library, a Saturn operating system which made it feasible to create a near-arcade perfect port of Virtua Fighter 2 for the Saturn.

After completing the Daytona USA port in April, the team took a short holiday before beginning work on the Virtua Fighter 2 conversion in earnest. In June, AM2 gave the first public demonstration of Saturn Virtua Fighter 2 at the Tokyo Toy Show. To increase confidence in the accuracy of the port, they displayed non-playable demos of the characters Lion, Shun, Pai, and Lau running on the Saturn hardware at 60 FPS - the same speed as the arcade version.

However, AM2 continued to face problems creating an accurate Saturn port. Due to the amount of moves in Virtua Fighter 2, months had to be spent on developing compression techniques to fit everything into the console's memory. Also, to maintain 60 FPS, the Saturn version could not use nearly as many polygons as the arcade version. To make this difference less apparent, the programming team used texture mapping for the characters, taking advantage of the Saturn's ability to map 16 colors to each polygon. In contrast, the Model 2 arcade hardware could map only 1 color per polygon. Also, the polygon background objects of the arcade version were replaced with parallax scrolling playfields with selective scaling. The AM2 team also used data from Virtua Fighter Remix as a reference for some elements. In an interview during development, Keiji Okayasu discussed the team's struggles with getting the Saturn version to run at 60 FPS:

If we didn't have to consider the speed, we could do the conversion very quickly. But with so much data, we can only move slowly. With Virtua Fighter 1 we could use the arcade data for each technique with just a few changes, but with 2 there's just too much data. But we have done well, although how is a secret... I think we couldn't have made 2 if we hadn't made the first conversion - but it's just as tough! We owe a lot to the new SGL OS [Sega Graphics Library Operating System] software.

Hit detection had been enabled by the end of September, and the now fully playable conversion was displayed at the JAMMA show. Considering audience reactions at the JAMMA show, the team spent the next two months on final adjustments, play-testing, and the addition of Saturn-specific options. Development on the port was completed in November 1995.

== Release ==
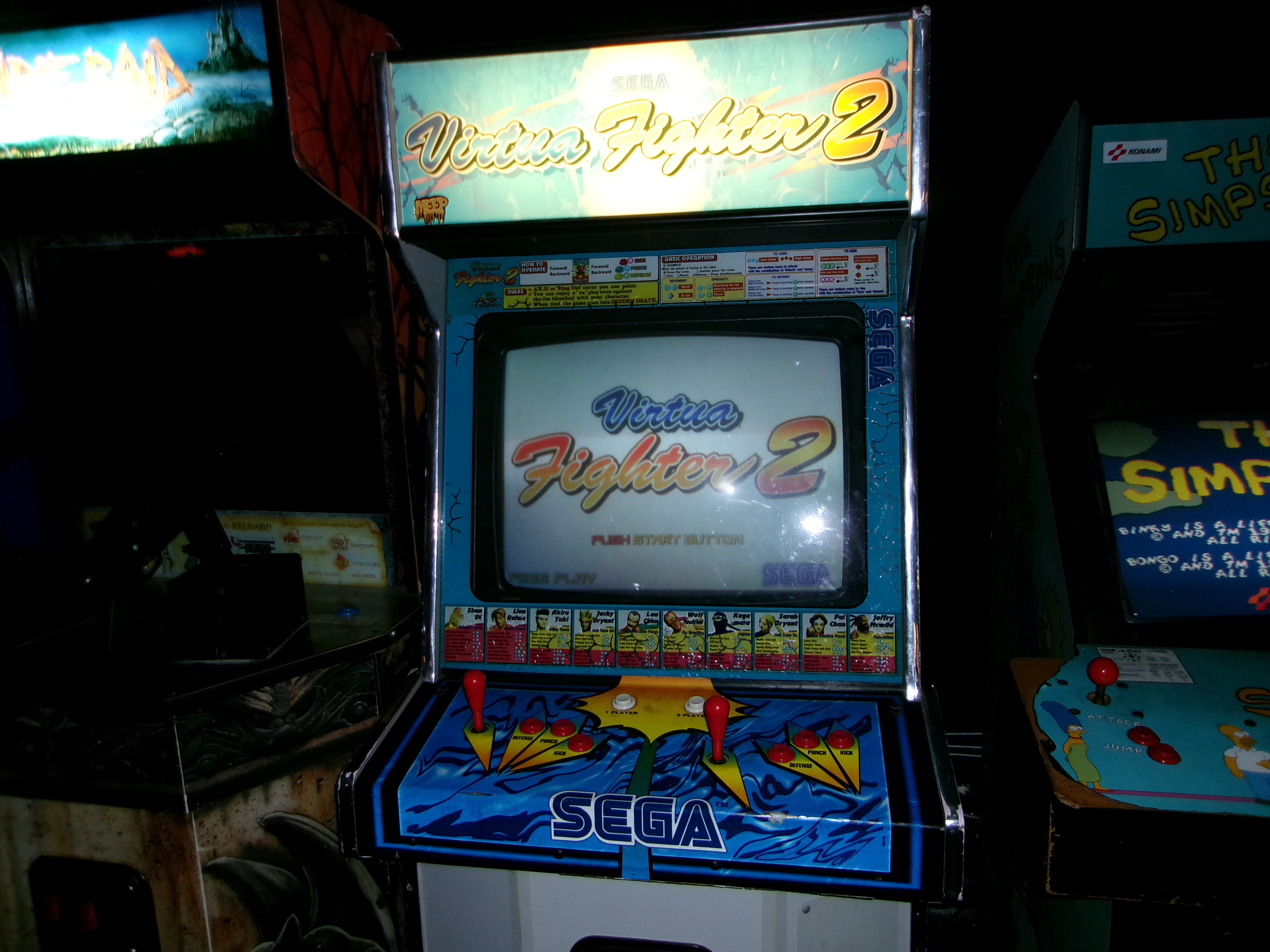
Virtua Fighter 2 arcade cabinet.

The original arcade game released for the Japanese market in November 1994. It then released overseas for Europe in December 1994, and North America in January 1995.

Virtua Fighter 2.1 is a revised version featuring re-tweaked gameplay, slightly enhanced graphics and the ability to play as a revamped Dural. Though it was never released outside Japan, the Saturn version includes an option to switch between the 2.0 and 2.1 gameplay mechanics. Dural can also be selected through a cheat code. In 2004, Sega AM2 developed a PlayStation 2 version featuring both arcade variants for the Japanese Sega Ages 2500 series.

In South Korea, the Saturn version was released in 1995 by Samsung Electronics, which distributed the game under the catalogue number GS-9507J. Samsung promoted the release through a gaming tournament scheduled for December 17, 1995, at Yongsan Electronics Market in Seoul, with Saturn consoles offered among the prizes.

In Poland, a Virtua Fighter 2 tournament was held at the Gambleriada gaming exhibition in Warsaw on 25 October 1996. The competition used four two-player Sega Saturn stations, with a console supplied by Polish distributor Bobmark as the grand prize. The tournament was won by Adam Wojtunik, who had previously won a Mortal Kombat II competition at the inaugural Gambleriada in 1995.

In mainland China, Virtua Fighter 2 was featured at Sega's first Shanghai arcade, which opened in February 1996. The venue installed two large-screen Megalo cabinets for the game and supplied printed character move lists to players. In spring 1997, Sega Huahan and Stone International Trade jointly organised the Beijing '97 Spring Virtua Fighter Tournament, with preliminary rounds held at three Sega-operated arcades in Beijing. Sixteen players qualified for the finals, which attracted more than 100 spectators. Shanghai competitor Xu Sheng defeated Beijing's Liu Hao to win the tournament, receiving a Sega Saturn console and a copy of Virtua Fighter 2 as prizes.

The Saturn port was scheduled for a December 1995 release in Europe, in time for the crucial Christmas shopping season, but it did not appear until the end of the following January. A 2D adaptation of Virtua Fighter 2 was released for the Mega Drive/Genesis in 1996. The Mega Drive version was subsequently included in Sega Genesis Collection for the PlayStation 2 and PlayStation Portable in 2006. It was released for the Wii's Virtual Console service on 20 March 2007 in Japan and 16 April 2007 in North America. An iOS version was released on 20 January 2011, featuring touch controls and Bluetooth multiplayer. The Mega Drive version was also added to the Nintendo Switch Online + Expansion Pack service on 15 December 2022. A port of the arcade version was released digitally for Xbox 360 and PlayStation 3 in November 2012.

In Japan, a Virtua Fighter 2 "CG Portrait Series" of discs were released for the Saturn. Each of the eleven discs (one for each playable character) contains a slideshow of high-resolution CG stills of the character engaged in non-fighting activities such as playing pool or eating ice cream, backed by a Japanese pop song, as well as a karaoke mode.

== Reception ==
Reception (arcade and Sega Saturn versions)

Review scores
| Publication | Score | |
| Publication | Arcade | Saturn |
|---|---|---|
| AllGame | 4.5/5 | 4/5 |
| Computer and Video Games | 93% | 97% |
| Edge | | 8/10 |
| Electronic Gaming Monthly | | 8.5/10, 8/10, 8.5/10, 8/10 |
| EP Daily | | 10/10 |
| Famitsu | | 9/10, 10/10, 10/10, 10/10 |
| Game Informer | | 8.75/10 |
| GameFan | | 294/300 |
| GameRevolution | | A |
| GamesMaster | | 95% |
| Hyper | | 94% |
| IGN | | 9/10 |
| Next Generation | | 5/5 |
| Player One | | 98% |
| Maximum | | 5/5 |
| Sega Magazin | | 95% |
| Sega Saturn Magazine | | 98% |
| Ultimate Future Games | 95% | 92% |

Awards
| Publication | Award |
|---|---|
| Gamest Awards | Game of the Year, Best Fighting Game, Best Graphics, Most Popular Game |
| Game Players | Game of the Year |
| GamePro | Best Saturn Game |
| AMOA Awards | Most Innovative New Technology (nomination) |

=== Arcade version ===
In Japan, Game Machine listed Virtua Fighter 2 as the most successful arcade game of December 1994. It went on to become Japan's highest-grossing arcade game in 1995 and 1996. In the United States, the game also generated high earnings upon release, and went on to become one of the top ten best-selling arcade video games in the country in 1995. As of 1996, over 40,000 arcade units were sold worldwide. Virtua Fighter and Virtua Fighter 2 became Sega's best-selling arcade games of all time, surpassing Out Run (1986).

Virtua Fighter 2 was critically acclaimed upon release. It used the Sega Model 2 arcade hardware to run the game at 60 frames per second at a high resolution with no slowdown (by comparison, the original Virtua Fighter ran at 30 frames per second). Computer and Video Games gave the arcade game a positive review, praising the "stunning visuals" as "quite possibly the best graphics ever seen in a fully-playable arcade title", the "quality of the animation" where "you can certainly feel each blow when they connect and the character reels back" and the "more accessible" combos which "opens up the opportunity for a number of new sequences." The magazine later called it "the greatest arcade game ever made" in December 1995.

=== Sega Saturn version ===
Sega reported pre-orders of 1.5 million units for the Sega Saturn version of Virtua Fighter 2 in Japan, which is nearly as many of the number of Sega Saturns that had been sold in Japan at that point. Upon its Japanese release, 700,000 copies were sold within two days. It was the third best-selling home video game of 1995 in Japan, below Dragon Quest VI and Chrono Trigger. Virtua Fighter 2 also became the top-selling game worldwide for the Sega Saturn, and remains the highest-selling Sega Saturn game in Japan with 1.7 million copies sold. In the USA, the game was bundled with various Sega Saturn consoles for a while alongside Daytona USA and Virtua Cop, which helped boost the Sega Saturn's sales. Virtua Fighter 2 sold more than 500,000 bundled copies in the USA by December 1996, bringing total sales to more than 2.2 million units sold in Japan and the USA. In the United Kingdom, the Saturn version debuted at number one on the ELSPA/Gallup CD-console sales chart displayed on Teletext on 14 January 1996, retaining the top position in the chart shown on 21 January. In France, Sega France general manager Bruno Charpentier stated that the Saturn releases of Virtua Fighter 2, Virtua Cop and Sega Rally Championship had strongly boosted console sales. He claimed that Sega gained ten points of market share against Sony between December 1995 and February 1996, as the three arcade conversions became available. In Italy, Game Power identified Virtua Fighter 2 and Sega Rally Championship as major "killer applications" for the Saturn, crediting their releases with helping the console begin catching up with the PlayStation. In Hong Kong, Game Players reported that Virtua Fighter 2 was among the titles attracting consumers to purchase the Saturn, noting that even some people who were not ordinarily dedicated video game players had bought the console after being drawn to Sega's late-1995 releases. In South Korea, Virtua Fighter 2 ranked first in the Sega Saturn chart published in the January 1996 issue of Game Champ, which compiled its rankings using reader responses and retailer information. In mainland China, Shanghai video game retailer Xia Tao organised a pre-order campaign for the Saturn version of Virtua Fighter 2 in December 1995. Despite genuine copies costing over ¥900, his shop received more than 20 pre-orders within two weeks. A 2009 retrospective published by 17173 contrasted this initial demand with the proliferation of pirated Saturn games in 1996.

The Sega Saturn port was critically acclaimed upon release. Japanese Sega Saturn Magazine awarded the Saturn version an average score of 9.66 out of 10 in its November 1995 review panel, comprising scores of 10, 9 and 10 from its female-user, high-roller and guest-writer groups, respectively. Next Generation gave the game a perfect 5/5 stars, calling it "the ultimate arcade translation" and "the best fighting game ever." The magazine cited its "accurate representation of ten very distinct and realistic fighting styles", "remarkable AI", and "a general attention to detail that sets a new mark for quality game design." Sega Saturn Magazine gave the Sega Saturn version a 98%, citing the smooth frame rate, the realistically varied reactions to blows, the huge variety of moves, and the addition of features such as Team Battle Mode. Similarly praising the variety of moves and the accuracy of the port, Game Revolution gave the Sega Saturn version an A and concluded that "Virtua Fighter 2 for the Saturn looks better and smoother than any other polygonal fighting game for the next generation systems. This just might be the best home console fighting game ever." GamePro called it "the game to own if you have a Saturn", citing the authentic fighting styles and moves, the new modes, the realistic animations with strong attention to detail, and the easy to master controls. They gave it a perfect score in all four categories (graphics, sound, control, and FunFactor).

The four reviewers of EGM felt the port was not as arcade-perfect as it could have been, but highly praised the wealth of options and modes, with two of their reviewers declaring it by far the best fighting game on the Sega Saturn thus far. Game Informer's Andy, Reiner and Paul praised Virtua Fighter 2 for its depth and variety, but criticized inferior background details in the Sega Saturn port, while Paul also felt that the original Virtua Fighter required more strategy. Maximum described the port as "remarkably similar to its coin-op parent - a game that's running on hardware that's 20 times more expensive than the Sega Saturn." They particularly praised the high-resolution graphics, smooth frame rate, "breathtaking" variety of moves, and the numerous Sega Saturn-exclusive modes and options. With their one criticism being the very vulnerable opponent AI, they gave it their "Maximum Game of the Month" award.

The Saturn version also received positive reviews across continental Europe. French magazine Consoles + awarded it 96%, praising its presentation, graphics and lasting appeal. Germany's MAN!AC gave it 88%, with comparatively lower ratings for graphics and sound. Italy's Console Mania awarded it 97%, particularly praising its graphics and playability. Spain's Hobby Consolas gave it 94%, highlighting the graphical improvements and additional game modes while observing that the gameplay remained largely unchanged from Virtua Fighter Remix.

Retrospective feedback on the Sega Saturn version has continued to gather praise. GamesRadar ranked it the third-best Sega Saturn game, stating that "with Sonic sitting much of this generation out, is there a franchise more synonymous with the Sega Saturn than Virtua Fighter?" 1UP described the Sega Saturn port as featuring "crisp, fast visuals and deeply nuanced game mechanics." They also claimed the game had aged well, unlike other fighters released around the time, such as the original Tekken. IGN also ranked it as the second-best Sega Saturn game, saying that the game "stands head and shoulders above all 32-bit fighters. All of them."

=== Accolades ===
Gamest Awards gave Virtua Fighter 2 the top awards for Game of the Year, Best Fighting Game, Best Graphics, and Most Popular Game. Game Players magazine also awarded it Game of the Year. GamePro awarded it Best Saturn Game of 1995. The AMOA Awards nominated it for Most Innovative New Technology.

In 1996, GamesMaster ranked the Saturn version second on their list of "The GamesMaster Saturn Top 10". In the same issue, they also listed the game 13th in its list of the "Top 100 Games of All Time". It has also been listed as one of the best games of all time by Next Generation in 1996 and 1999, IGN in 2003, Famitsu in 2006, Stuff in 2008 and Electronic Gaming Monthly in 1997, 2001 and 2006. In 2013, Virtua Fighter 2 was ranked the 19th best arcade game of the 1990s by Complex.

=== Other versions ===
Reception (other versions)

Aggregate scores
| Aggregator | Score |
|---|---|
| GameRankings | 44% (GEN) |
| Metacritic | 41/100 (iOS); 70/100 (X360) |

Review scores
| Publication | Score |
|---|---|
| AllGame | 1.5/5 (SMD) |
| Computer and Video Games | 3/5 (SMD) |
| GameSpot | 8.1/10 (PC) |

GameSpot praised the game's realism, depth, opponent AI and the PC version's inclusion of online multiplayer. They deemed it "unquestionably the best fighting game on the PC, and certainly one of the finest fighting games of all time", adding that the PC version "rivals even the excellent Sega Saturn console port." The PlayStation 2 port of the game was criticized for failing to be faithful to the original arcade version.
