= Sega Racing Studio =

UK video game developer

- Type: Division
- Industry: Video games
- Founded: 2005; 21 years ago
- Defunct: 2008; 18 years ago
- Fate: Acquired, merged, and folded into Codemasters
- Headquarters: Solihull, England, United Kingdom
- Key people: Guy Wilday
- Products: Sega Rally series
- Parent: Sega
- Website: racing.sega.co.uk (archived version 2005-12-18)

Sega Racing Studio (abbreviated as SRS; also known as Sega Driving Studio) was a computer and video game developer established in 2005 (based in Solihull, England) for the sole purpose of developing AAA Sega racing titles. The studio had radically expanded from a small group of people to a team of over 60 employees by the year 2007 drawing talent from other major British developers such as Rockstar Games, Rare, Codemasters, and Criterion Games. Its mission statement was to create driving games for the Western market while paying homage to Sega's legacy in the genre and developing new racing IPs.

The development studio was aiming to become large enough to be able "to be a multi-sku, multi-game studio" and develop multiple titles at the same time. The team was called autonomous from Sega while still being part of the organization.

The studio was headed by Guy Wilday, who was involved in the Colin McRae Rally games and was formerly the head of the studio behind the games and the series producer.

== Acquisition by Codemasters ==
On 8 April 2008 Sega announced the closure of Sega Racing Studio, although no reason was specified for the closure, it has been assumed it was due to lacklustre sales of Sega Rally Revo. At a later time, Sega announced none of the employees were folded into internal studios.

On 25 April 2008 Codemasters announced that it had acquired Sega Racing Studio.

When Grid 2 was announced, the studio was brought back up as Codemasters Racing.

== Games developed ==
- Sega Rally Revo (2007)
- Sega Rally 3 (2008)
