= Sega Rally Championship =

1995 video game

- Arcade flyer
- Developer: Sega AM3
- Publisher: Sega
- Director: Kenji Sasaki
- Producer: Tetsuya Mizuguchi
- Programmer: Sohei Yamamoto
- Artist: Kenji Sasaki
- Composers: Takenobu Mitsuyoshi; Naofumi Hataya (Sega Saturn)
- Series: Sega Rally
- Platforms: Arcade; Sega Saturn; Windows; N-Gage; Game Boy Advance; PlayStation 2
- Release: February 1995: Arcade; JP: February 1995; NA/EU: 1995 Saturn; NA: November 15, 1995; JP: December 29, 1995; EU: January 24, 1996; JP: September 20, 1996 (Plus); NA: 1998 (NetLink Edition) Windows; JP: January 31, 1997; NA: February 19, 1997 Game Boy Advance; JP: December 19, 2002; NA: March 11, 2003; EU: May 2, 2003 N-Gage; AU: 2004 PlayStation 2 (as part of Sega Rally 2006); JP: January 12, 2006; KOR: March 30, 2006
- Genre: Racing
- Modes: Single-player, multiplayer
- Arcade system: Sega Model 2

Sega Rally Championship is a 1995 racing game developed and published by Sega. Originally released for arcades using the Sega Model 2 board, ports were published for the Sega Saturn in 1995 and Microsoft Windows in 1997. It is a rally racing game that simulates driving on different surfaces with varying friction, with the car's handling changing accordingly. As the first racing game to incorporate this feature, Sega Rally Championship is considered to be a milestone in the evolution of the racing game genre. It is however considered an arcade game with a degree of realism rather than a fully realistic simulator of rallying. The game features both cooperative and competitive multiplayer. An enhanced version was released for the Saturn in 1998, supporting analog controls with the Saturn 3D Pad and online play via the Sega Net Link.

Sega Rally Championship received critical acclaim, with praise for its gameplay and controls, and it is considered one of the greatest video games of all time. The Saturn version was lauded for its accuracy to the arcade version; later ports were less well-received. The game spawned the Sega Rally series, and was followed by several ports and sequels on subsequent platforms.

== Gameplay ==
Gameplay of the desert stage in the Saturn version. On-screen directions help the player stay on course.

In Sega Rally Championship, players can enter a "World Championship" mode consisting of three stages: desert, forest and mountain. The player's finishing position at the end of one stage is carried through to the starting position of the next stage. In this mode, it is impossible to reach first place by the end of the first stage; thus, the player must try to overtake as many opponent cars as possible on each track (while staying within the time limit), and gain the lead over several tracks. If the player is in first place at the end of the third stage, they will advance to the extra fourth stage called "Lakeside" (on the Saturn version, this course may then be played in time attack and split-screen multiplayer modes).

Three cars are featured in the game; Didier Auriol's third generation Toyota Celica GT-Four and Juha Kankkunen's Lancia Delta HF Integrale which are both available from the start, and Sandro Munari's Lancia Stratos HF which is unlocked by finishing Lakeside in first place in the Saturn version, or by using an easter egg in the arcade version. Players may drive each car in either manual or automatic transmission.

The arcade version of the game supports up to four players using cabinets linked together, while the Saturn version supports two-player splitscreen multiplayer.

== Development ==
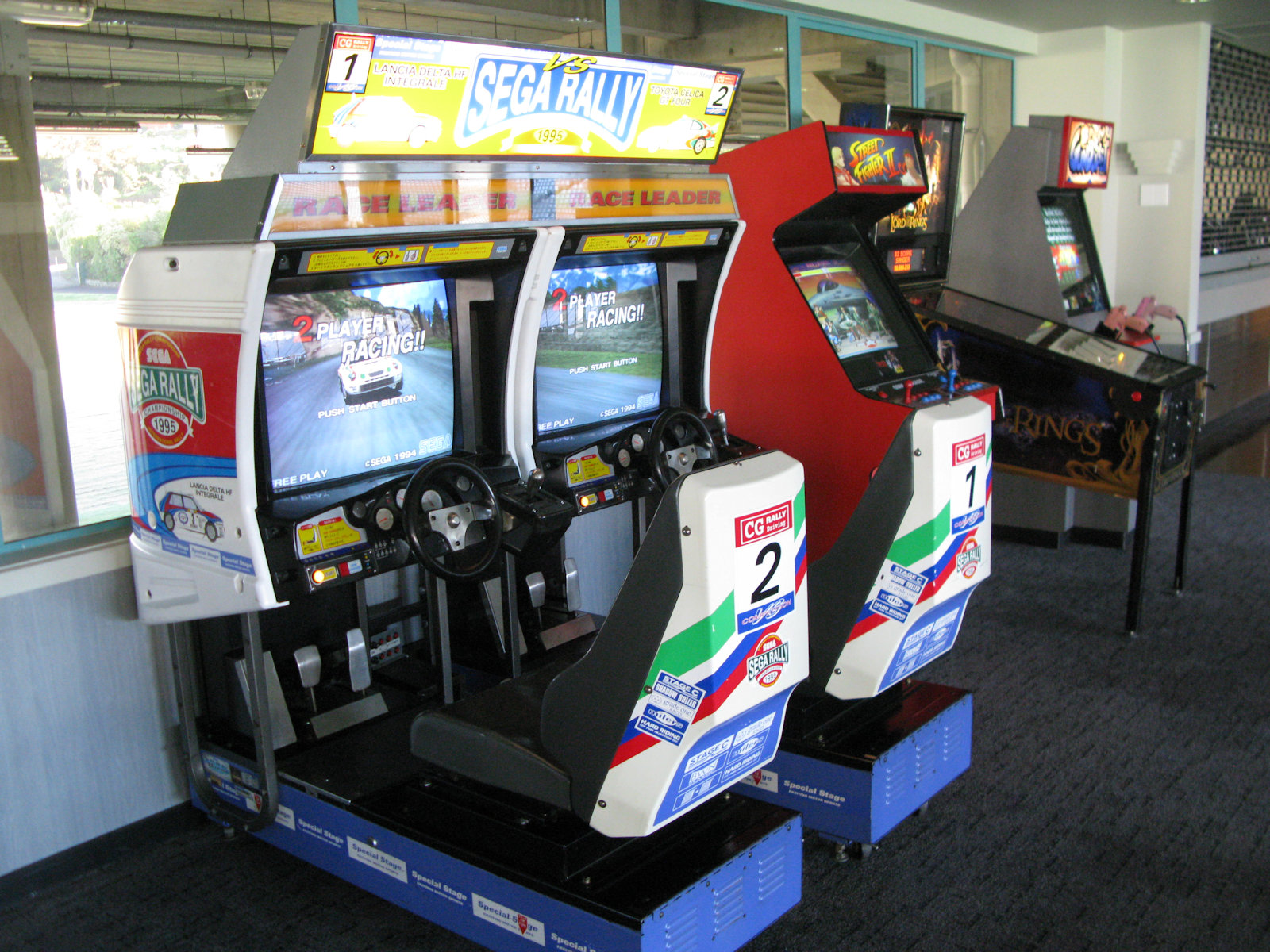
Twin version Japanese cabinet with 29 inch monitors

Sega Rally Championship was directed by Kenji Sasaki, a former Namco employee known for his work on Ridge Racer (1993). Seeking to develop a racing game that was distinct from popular arcade titles including Ridge Racer and Daytona USA (1994), Sasaki chose the rally racing subgenre, which he felt was "taboo" in the Japanese gaming community: "We were after something in vogue in terms of motorsport racing and as we were keen on great engine sounds, cool cars and great sensations—the obvious choice was rally". While the game featured only three cars—the Toyota Celica GT-Four, Lancia Delta Group A, and a hidden Lancia Stratos—it was distinguished by its "stylized handling" and some tuning options. Asked why the developers chose to use the Celica and Delta, team manager Hiroto Kikuchi answered: "We felt that in the rally, we had to use real rally cars and the chosen vehicles were well known and looked good". Senior programmer Riyuchi Hattori added: "Originally there was talk of using another car from Toyota, but we couldn't find a good one. For example, the Supra would have been just the same as the Celica and not much fun to use in the game, so we ended up with just the one. We also took note of the consumers' opinions, which confirmed that if another car was to be added it should be the Stratos". According to game designer Tetsuya Mizuguchi, they had no experience in driving those cars, but after repeated requests Toyota and Fiat provided feedback for game testing. Fiat also made a gentlemen's agreement with the developers allowing the use of official logos and such in Sega Rally Championship; there was no formal sponsorship deal for the game. Mizuguchi's car was used to produce the in-game sound of the Lancia Delta's engine.

While developing the game's visual style, the development team spent three weeks driving from the West Coast of the United States to Mexico, taking photographs for use in texture mapping. At one point, Sasaki became deeply worried about Rally's prospects for success, and even began to question why driving cars was considered "fun": "I drove up into the mountains with my own car. It was such an enjoyable and exhilarating experience ... This was how the third mountain track in the game was conceived". Sasaki further stated that, originally, the game was in the style of the movie The Cannonball Run, and the forest stage was based on Redwood National Park, but the release of Cruis'n USA (1994) by Midway Games caused them to change direction as well as redesign the forest to be based on Yosemite National Park to avoid similarities. In an October 1995 interview with German magazine Sega Magazin, Sega AM3's Tetsuya Mizuguchi stated that the original arcade game had taken ten months to develop. He explained that members of the team had ridden alongside professional rally drivers to study the sport, while the game's co-driver voice actor, Kenneth Ibrahim, had examined footage of actual races to reproduce authentic navigation instructions. Mizuguchi also explained that his objective was to combine realistic graphics with the excitement of racing rather than create a strictly realistic driving simulation.

The Sega Saturn version of the game had to be almost completely remade, only referencing the graphics of the arcade version, which required detailed planning. Mizuguchi recounted: "Our designers went back to the arcade version and worked out the locations, drew pictures and captured the atmosphere and the feeling of distance. Then there was about two weeks discussion on their work. During this time they worked on the car settings and we had Mr. Yoshio Fujimoto, winner in the Toyota Castrol car to advise it. Then Mr. Nakamura, Mr. Hattori, and Mr. Fujimoto went to the Asian Pacific Indonesian Rally for three days and studied the cars". Aside from Mizuguchi producing both projects, the Saturn development team was completely different from the original arcade team. Unlike other well-received arcade conversions for the Saturn such as Virtua Fighter 2 and Virtua Cop, Sega Rally Championship was developed without using the Sega Graphics Library operating system, as it had not yet been completed when work on the game began. For similar reasons, a split screen was used for multiplayer mode instead of the Saturn link cable; the developers also felt it was important that multiplayer be available to all owners of the Saturn game, not only those who had also purchased a link cable. As the arcade version of Rally was designed to be controlled with a steering wheel, the developers struggled to simulate its drifting techniques using the Saturn's controller. The game also supports the Saturn Steering Wheel, though it lacks the haptic feedback of the arcade version's steering wheel. In an October 1995 interview with French magazine Mega Force, Tetsuya Mizuguchi discussed the Saturn conversion's Machine Setting mode, which allowed players to adjust vehicle characteristics such as suspension. He explained that the developers had researched real rally vehicles, including the Toyota Celica, to make the effects of these adjustments more convincing. In a January 1996 interview with Spanish magazine Hobby Consolas, Mizuguchi explained that the Saturn conversion could have been made faster and more visually impressive, but that doing so would have significantly increased its retail price. He also emphasised enjoyable gameplay over strict realism, observing that more realistic driving simulators were not necessarily more entertaining.

The music for the arcade game was composed by Takenobu Mitsuyoshi, while the Saturn version's soundtrack consisted of a combination of newly composed music by Naofumi Hataya and arrangements of the arcade originals arranged and produced by Takayuki Hijikata, previously released on the album Sega Rally Championship Ignition.

The Sega Saturn version was rushed to the North American market in order to take advantage of the Christmas shopping season. By the time of its release in Japan and Europe, the development team had completed several additional graphical improvements, bug fixes, and front-end options. The European release included improvements over the North American version, including animated spectators, six selectable translucent ghost cars and expanded replay camera options. The British and Japanese versions also included additional scenery in the Forest course. A version was also released that allowed online play via the Sega Net Link.

== Release ==
The Sega Saturn version was released in Japan on December 29, 1995, retaining the full title of its arcade counterpart, Sega Rally Championship 1995. The year was dropped from the title of the North American and European versions. In South Korea, Samsung Electronics marketed the Saturn version of Sega Rally Championship, advertising a December 1995 release at a suggested retail price of 74,000 won. The European release was scheduled for December 1995, in time for the crucial Christmas shopping season, but it did not appear until the end of the following January.

Regional promotional campaigns included a Sega Saturn hardware bundle sold in Spain for 34,900 pesetas during the 1996 Christmas shopping season. The promotion involved retailer Alcampo and telecommunications company Airtel, which also offered a Motorola 6200 mobile phone subject to additional conditions. The May 1996 issue of Australian magazine Hyper offered readers the chance to win a Sega Saturn console alongside Sega Rally Championship, Daytona USA and F1 Challenge through a magazine subscription competition. In 1997, hardware bundles featuring Sega Rally Championship alongside Sega Worldwide Soccer 97 were released in France, Germany and the United Kingdom in 1997.

The game was also promoted through several international competitions. Portugal's "Sega–Nestlé Challenge" was held in 1996, with participants recording their fastest times in the Saturn version of Sega Rally Championship at Sega stands in Continente supermarkets. The fastest competitors advanced to a final in Lisbon, where they competed in split-screen races. The winner received a trip to Disney World, while the runner-up received Sega vouchers worth 150,000 Portuguese escudos and Nestlé chocolates. Japan's Saturn Fan held a Sega Rally Championship time-attack competition in 1996. The contest featured separate rankings for the game's regular vehicles and the unlockable Lancia Stratos, covering different course difficulty levels. The magazine published interim standings in February and announced the final results in its combined May issue.

British magazine Sega Saturn Magazine organised a three-month Sega Rally Championship time-attack competition in early 1996, following a similar contest for Daytona USA. Entrants submitted their combined times across the Desert, Forest and Mountain courses in Championship Mode, with a closing date of 30 April 1996. The first prize was a year's supply of Sega Saturn games, while runners-up were offered Sega AM3 merchandise. A separate Sega Saturn tournament in Poland was organised in 1996, with a car offered as the grand prize and a televised final planned. However, the outcome of the competition remains undocumented.

== Reception and legacy ==
Reception

Aggregate score
Aggregator	Score			
Aggregator	Arcade	GBA	PC	Saturn
Metacritic		59/100		

Review scores
Publication	Score			
Publication	Arcade	GBA	PC	Saturn
Computer Gaming World			3/5	
Consoles +				96%
Computer and Video Games				95%
Electronic Gaming Monthly				17/20
Game Informer				8.5/10
GameFan				288/300
GamesMaster				95%
GameSpot			5.6/10	
Next Generation	4/5		3/5	5/5
Player One				98%
Maximum				5/5
Sega Magazin				95%
Sega Power				97%
Sega Saturn Magazine				97%

Awards
Publication	Award
GameFan Megawards (1995)	Racing Game of the Year
Gamest Awards (1995)	8th Best Action, 9th Best Graphics
GamePro Readers' Choice; Awards (1996)	6th Best Racing Game
Retro Gamer (2009)	Top Racing Game Ever
Guinness World Records (2009)	44th Top Console Game

=== Arcade ===
Upon release, the game sold 12,000 arcade units. In Japan, Game Machine listed Sega Rally Championship as the second most successful dedicated arcade game of March 1995. It went on to be the second highest-grossing dedicated arcade game of 1995 in Japan. In the United States, it was one of the top six best-selling arcade games of 1995, receiving a Platinum Award from the American Amusement Machine Association (AAMA). Although the game was not as popular as Daytona USA in the United States, it was more popular in Europe.

The arcade game was met with positive reviews from critics. Next Generation reviewed the arcade version of the game, stating that "Rally's downside is the car's indestructibility: no matter how much you slam into either opponents or banks, your racer [...] receives not a scratch, nor can you flip or leave the road [...] And some might say the control is a fault, too; our response? Keep practicing, buddy".

=== Home conversions ===
The Sega Saturn version would go on to sell 1.2 million copies. In Japan, Sega Rally Championship topped the charts on release, coming in number 1 during Week 52 in 1995. It was a major system-seller for the system in the United Kingdom, becoming the fastest selling CD game at the time. In France, Sega France general manager Bruno Charpentier credited the Saturn releases of Sega Rally Championship, Virtua Cop and Virtua Fighter 2 with significantly boosting console sales. He claimed that Sega had gained ten points of market share against Sony between December 1995 and February 1996, following the releases of the three games. The game was also regarded as a major "killer application" for the Saturn in Italy, where Game Power credited it and Virtua Fighter 2 with helping the console begin catching up with the PlayStation. In Germany, Sega Rally Championship topped the Sega Saturn sales charts published by Media Control from April to July 1996. In Spain, Sega Rally Championship debuted at number one in Hobby Consolas' Sega Saturn chart in February 1996 and remained at the top in May. In Australia, Sega Rally Championship continued to appear in the retailer-supplied Sega Saturn charts published by Hyper magazine during 1997. The game ranked third in March, second in June, fourth in July and seventh in August. It also appeared in ninth place in November and tenth in December. In Sweden, Roger Jönsson, former product manager at Sega distributor Brio, identified Sega Rally Championship as the Saturn's most commercially successful game in the country. Former Portuguese international footballer Domingos Paciência later recalled that Sega Rally Championship on the Sega Saturn became a favourite among players during national-team training camps.

The Saturn version was met with almost universally positive reviews. Next Generation praised the Saturn version's "down-and-dirty feel", "truly phenomenal high-speed visuals", and "quick, responsive control". The magazine cited the game's physics and handling as "nothing short of remarkable". Game Informer's Reiner and Andy gave Sega Rally Championship scores of 8/10 and 8.5/10, making note of technical improvements over the Saturn version of Sega's Daytona USA, which Andy nonetheless felt was the better game. Game Informer's Paul was more effusive, rating the Saturn port 9.25/10 for its "far better racing feel" and superior graphics to Daytona. Sega Saturn Magazine praised the difficulty of unlocking the secret course and secret car, and remarking that "whilst there's enough drag, slide action and difficulty wrestling with the controls to convince you the programmers know what it's like to drive a rally car, there's never so much realism that you'd have to know how to drive one yourself to play the game". Later, Sega Saturn Magazine would rank the game as the second best game on the platform, saying "two years on its release and Sega Rally is still the best racer on a console bar none".

Both of the sports reviewers for Electronic Gaming Monthly gave the Saturn version an 8.5 out of 10, saying it "has all of the action and adventure of its arcade cousin. If you were disappointed with Daytona, you won't be with Sega Rally". Bruised Lee of GamePro praised the additional features of the Saturn version and technical improvements over Daytona USA, but criticized that the sounds, while identical to the arcade version, are unexciting compared to other racing games. He said that the power-slide technique can be initially frustrating but once mastered is "effective and fun". Maximum decreed the conversion to be "every bit as good as anyone could have ever hoped", stating that aside from the frame rate being reduced to 30 frames per second, it is essentially identical to the arcade version. They also complimented the inclusion of a two-player mode, numerous options, and secret modes.

Reception of the Saturn version in continental Europe was highly positive. French magazine Consoles+ awarded Sega Rally Championship 96%, praising the quality of the arcade conversion, its responsive handling and lasting appeal. German magazine MAN!AC gave the game 89 out of 100, praising its driving mechanics, presentation and successful recreation of the arcade game.

Italian magazine Console Mania awarded the game 96 out of 100, particularly praising its graphics, sound and playability, and regarding the conversion as an impressive demonstration of the Saturn's capabilities. Spanish magazine Hobby Consolas gave the game 95 out of 100, praising its realistic handling, visual presentation and multiplayer gameplay, and considering it one of the strongest driving games available on the console.

In Japan, Sega Saturn Magazine awarded the Saturn version individual reviewer scores of 8, 10 and 10 out of 10, averaging 9.33. The reviewers praised its handling, convincing recreation of rally driving techniques and additional features, including two-player competition and time attacks. In the magazine's final reader rankings, subsequently compiled in the 2000 book Saturn no Game wa Sekai Ichi!, Sega Rally Championship ranked 59th among 945 rated Saturn games, receiving an average reader rating of 9.0821 out of 10.

The Windows version was less well received. Critics generally commented that the fun gameplay is still wholly intact, but that the conversion lacks many features standard to PC racing games and suffers from mediocre frame rates except when playing in low-resolution mode, in which case it instead suffers from having lower detail and more pixelation than the Saturn version. Mark Clarkson of Computer Gaming World found the biggest problem was that, being a port of an arcade game, it lacks the longevity expected of a PC game, though he judged it to be fun while it lasted. Next Generation concluded that those looking specifically to play Sega Rally Championship on PC would find the version sufficient, but that there were better PC racers available. GameSpot's Stephen Poole opined that the content of the game was "just not enough".

=== Accolades ===
In 1996, Next Generation listed it as number 57 on their "Top 100 Games of All Time", citing the "heavier", more realistic feel of the car when compared to other racing games, and the generally realistic controls. In 1996, GamesMaster ranked the game number 1 on their "The GamesMaster Saturn Top 10". In the same issue, they also rated the game 24th in its "Top 100 Games of All Time". In January 1997, the Saturn version of Sega Rally Championship was named Best Driving Game of 1996 on the Finnish television programme Game Over, broadcast by MTV3. In a subsequent advertisement published in Super Power, Sega claimed that the Saturn version had been voted Best Console Game of 1996 in an MTV3 viewer poll. In 1999, Next Generation listed Sega Rally as number 19 on their "Top 50 Games of All Time", commenting that, "one of the best Model 2 games, Sega Rally is some of the best fun you can have in a car without having to pretend that you've run out of gas". Sega Rally Championship was named the best racing game of all time by Retro Gamer magazine, which ranked it at the top of its "Top 25 Racing Games Ever" list. In Guinness World Records: Gamer's Edition 2009 the Saturn version of the game made it to 44th position in the list of the Top 50 Console Games, due to its "distinct handling style and superb track design". IGN staff writer Levi Buchanan ranked Sega Rally Championship 6th in his list of the top 10 Sega Saturn games, saying: "Yes, the Dreamcast version is much better and the current-gen sequel... is stunning, but this Saturn arcade port was one of the top reasons to stick by SEGA as it flailed through the 32-bit days". Some publications and fan-voted lists have considered it to be one of the best games of all time, including Next Generation in 1996, or Electronic Gaming Monthly in 1997, Computer and Video Games in 2000, Edge in 2007, and NowGamer in 2010. In 2024, The Guardian would rank Sega Rally Championship third on their list of best Sega arcade games.

=== Impact ===
The game spawned the Sega Rally series, and later followed spiritually by Initial D Arcade Stage from the same company, based on the Initial D comics and featuring base models of certain rally cars.

In 2010, Codemasters cited Sega Rally Championship as a strong influence on their first Colin McRae Rally game (1998). According to Guy Wilday, producer of the first four Colin McRae Rally games, the "basic premise for the game was based around" Sega Rally's car handling which "remains excellent to this day and it's still an arcade machine I enjoy playing".

The game also developed a following among motoring personalities. Jeremy Clarkson owned a linked pair of Sega Rally arcade machines at his home and wrote in 2009 that he had played them extensively, with all ten of the machines' fastest recorded times belonging to him. Motoring journalist Richard Bremner later recalled that racing drivers would visit Clarkson's home to play the machine, including future World Rally Champion Richard Burns.

Former AS Monaco FC footballer Éric Di Meco recalled spending many evenings playing Sega Rally with Thierry Henry and other younger players during Henry's time at the club.
