= Sega Rally Revo =

2007 video game

- Developers: Sega Racing Studio (PlayStation 3, Xbox 360, Microsoft Windows); Bugbear Entertainment (PlayStation Portable)
- Publisher: Sega
- Composers: Paul Arnold; Andrew Barnabas
- Series: Sega Rally
- Platforms: PlayStation 3, PlayStation Portable, Xbox 360, Microsoft Windows
- Release: September 27, 2007: AU: September 27, 2007; EU: September 28, 2007; NA: October 9, 2007; AS: October 29, 2007 (PSP, X360); AS: November 1, 2007 (PS3); NA: November 19, 2007 (PC); JP: January 31, 2008; JP: February 7, 2008 (PC)
- Genre: Racing
- Modes: Single-player, multiplayer

Sega Rally Revo (known in Europe as Sega Rally) is an offroad racing video game, the fourth installment of the Sega Rally series. The game was released for PlayStation 3, PlayStation Portable, Xbox 360 and Microsoft Windows in 2007. The game's title is "Revo" as Sega intends it to be a revolution in rally racing games. The game was developed simultaneously with Sega Rally 3, the game that was based on and served as the basis for this game.

== Gameplay ==
=== Cars and tracks ===
There are 34 vehicles in total, which are divided into 3 groups: Premier Class (4WD cars), Modified Class (2WD and Super 2000 cars) and Master Class (mostly classic rally cars). There are also several bonus cars—such as Dakar rally types, hill climbers, buggies, etc.—in every class, which can be unlocked with points by progressing through Championship Mode, plus one overall bonus car unlocked at the 100% completion of Championship Mode. The (non-bonus) cars each have 3 different liveries. There are also two setups for every car: off-road, for better grip on loose surfaces, and tarmac, for a higher top speed and more grip on hard surfaces. The different environments each feature three tracks (some of which can also be raced in reverse direction and/or at a different time of day), except for the bonus environment Lakeside which features only a single race track and is again unlocked by progressing through Championship Mode.

== Release date ==
Sega Rally Revo was released in 2007, September 28 in Europe and September 27 in Australia. A demo was released on Xbox Live on September 18 and on the PlayStation Network on September 20. The PC Demo was released September 28. The US PC release date was originally scheduled for October 30, but was pushed back until November 19. The game has since been made unavailable anywhere, due to the time-limited nature of real world car licensing.

== North American marketing ==
Part of the promotional activity in North America includes a series of three short comedy films that revolve around the antics of two valley girls as a racing partnership. Titled "Tonya & Donya", the films feature the double act of Natasha Leggero as driver and regular comedy collaborator Melinda Hill, as co-driver.

Each of the films ends with the strapline "Drive like a man".

== Development ==
The game was developed at the SEGA Racing Studio in Solihull, England. There are over 30 different rally cars to choose from, and six different environments, with 16 tracks in total. The game was developed with the GeoDeformation engine, which makes the terrain dynamically deformable, with effects to the cars' performances. Multiplayer mode allows two players to race with split-screen, whereas online multiplayer can be set to up six racers.

== Reception ==
Reception

Aggregate score
| Aggregator | Score |
|---|---|
| Metacritic | 77/100 (Xbox 360); 75/100 (PS3); 74/100 (PC) |

Sega Rally Revo received "generally favorable" reviews from critics for all platforms, according to review aggregator website Metacritic.

=== Sales ===
Despite the positive reception, the game did not meet SEGA's financial expectations. According to the NPD Group, the game sold 44,000 units in the United States across all platforms in February 2008. The lacklustre sales of the game ultimately led to Sega Racing Studio's closure on April 8, 2008, which SEGA later confirmed by request of GameSpot staff.
