= Sega Rally 2 =

1998 video game

- Developer: Sega AM Annex
- Publisher: Sega (Note: Mattel Interactive and Empire Interactive published the Windows version in North America and Europe, respectively.)
- Director: Kenji Sasaki
- Producer: Tetsuya Mizuguchi
- Programmer: Sohei Yamamoto
- Artist: Kenji Sasaki
- Composers: Arcade: Tatsuhiko Fuyuno; Susumu Isa; Tetsuya Yamamoto; Jun Senoue; Kenji Eno; Dreamcast: Hideki Naganuma; Tomonori Sawada
- Series: Sega Rally
- Platforms: Arcade, Dreamcast, Microsoft Windows
- Release: Arcade: JP: February 1998; NA: 1998; Dreamcast: JP: January 28, 1999; EU: October 14, 1999; NA: November 30, 1999; Windows: JP: June 25, 1999; EU: November 26, 1999; NA: November 29, 2000
- Genre: Racing game
- Modes: Single-player, multiplayer
- Arcade system: Sega Model 3

Sega Rally 2, (Note: Sega Rarī Tsū (セガラリー2)) also known as Sega Rally Championship 2, is an arcade racing game developed by Sega for the Model 3 arcade hardware. It is the sequel to 1995's Sega Rally Championship. The game was first released in arcades in February 1998, and was later ported to the Dreamcast, becoming one of the console's earliest titles when it was released in Japan on January 28, 1999. The Dreamcast version was released in Europe as a launch title on October 14, 1999, and then in North America on November 27. A Windows version was released in Japan and Europe that same year, with the North American release following suit in November 2000, where it was published by Mattel Interactive.

== Gameplay ==
As with the predecessor, Sega Rally Championship, the object of the game is to successfully drive along a track while reaching checkpoints and thus be rewarded with more time to enable the player to reach the goal. The handling of the car changing with the different road surfaces has also been retained. Sega Rally 2 added new vehicles, new environment settings for the circuits (including snowy tracks and a course set on an island), as well as including multiple circuits in each environment type. An updated version of the original game's Desert track is also included. A hand brake was added to the controls.

The arcade version has two modes: a Championship Mode, in which the player races against opponent cars, and a Practice Mode, in which there are no other cars on the tracks and the player races to beat the clock. The Toyota Celica GT-Four ST205, Lancia Delta HF Integrale and Lancia Stratos HF returned from the original Sega Rally Championship as selectable vehicles. New additions included the Toyota Corolla WRC, Mitsubishi Lancer Evolution, Subaru Impreza WRC, Peugeot 306 Maxi and Ford Escort WRC, the latter appearing in the arcade version. The vehicles have different handling characteristics depending on their drivetrain layouts, including four-wheel drive, front-wheel drive and mid-engined rear-wheel drive.

The Dreamcast and PC versions introduced a "10-Year Championship" mode, in which players competed across ten seasons of four races each. The mode featured changing weather conditions and course variations, with players able to adjust their cars' transmission, suspension, steering, tyres and gear ratios to suit different tracks and driving conditions. The Japanese Dreamcast release supported online multiplayer through the console's modem, using networking technology from Dwango and Microsoft's DirectPlay libraries. Online multiplayer was omitted from the North American and European releases. The Dreamcast version also supported Sega's Racing Controller, a steering-wheel peripheral released in Japan alongside the game on 28 January 1999. However, the conversion experienced inconsistent frame rates compared with the arcade original. The Japanese release fluctuated between 60 and 30 frames per second, while the North American version was adjusted to run at approximately 30–40 frames per second.

== Development and marketing ==
Development on the game began in March 1997, with producer Tetsuya Mizuguchi at the helm. Roughly half of the development personnel were Sega AM Annex staff, with the other half taken from a number of other internal studios at Sega. The majority of the development staff for the original Sega Rally Championship worked on Sega Rally 2. The team created their own development tools for the project.

During development, members of Sega AM Annex conducted real-world driving tests, including sessions at Nikko Circuit and on dirt courses using rally cars, to study vehicle handling and reproduce the driving experience in the game. Professional rally drivers Yoshio Fujimoto and Yoshihiro Kataoka were also invited to test Sega Rally 2, offering assessments of its handling and realism compared with actual rally driving. During development of the Dreamcast conversion, Sega AM12 personnel also participated in a driving session at Maruwa Auto Land using a rally-prepared Toyota Celica ST185.

The development team sought to take advantage of Sega's Model 3 hardware to improve the game's graphics and driving mechanics. In interviews with Sega Saturn Magazine, programmers discussed the technical challenges of moving from the Model 2 hardware used by the original Sega Rally Championship to Model 3, while emphasising the importance of recreating the experience of World Rally Championship racing rather than simply reproducing its predecessor.

The cabinet was designed by Sega AM4. Its designers experimented with the cabinet's frame, seating and speaker arrangement, seeking to reproduce the physical sensations of rally driving through movement and vibration as well as sound.

The game's soundtrack incorporated original compositions and live-recorded musical performances. In an April 1998 interview with Sega Saturn Magazine, composer Jun Senoue discussed the process of recording music for the arcade game, including the use of live instruments and the challenges of adapting the recordings for in-game playback. A soundtrack album was released in Japan on 1 April 1998.

The Dreamcast conversion was produced by Jun Taniguchi and directed by Isao Matsumoto of Sega AM12. In an October 1998 interview, the developers described the project as having initially been conceived with ambitions comparable to creating a Sega Rally 3, rather than simply reproducing the arcade game. The home version was designed to incorporate additional courses, vehicles and gameplay modes. The Dreamcast conversion was initially scheduled for release alongside the console's Japanese launch on 27 November 1998. Contemporary magazine coverage described a video-only demonstration of the conversion, which was ultimately released in Japan on 28 January 1999.

For the home release, Sega employed Microsoft's Windows CE environment and DirectX libraries. Sega also employed DirectPlay to implement the Japanese release's networked multiplayer functionality. In March 1999, Microsoft cited Sega Rally 2 as a demonstration of its Dreamcast development toolkit, identifying it as the only networked multiplayer title then available for the console in Japan.

During the European launch of the Dreamcast in October 1999, a head-to-head Sega Rally 2 competition was held in Paris, France. According to a contemporary Sega Europe launch report, the winner received a specially branded Dreamcast scooter. The competition formed part of the French launch celebrations, which included an appearance by Italian actor Rocco Siffredi at the Virgin Megastore on the Champs-Élysées. In Spain, a print advertisement for the Dreamcast release referenced the 1998 Rally of Great Britain, using co-driver Luis Moya's famous appeal to Carlos Sainz Sr. to restart his stalled car. Italian magazine Consolemania identified Sega Rally 2 as the first game Sega intended to use as a "killer application" for the console.

== Reception ==
Reception

Aggregate score
| Aggregator | Score | | |
| Aggregator | Arcade | Dreamcast | PC |
|---|---|---|---|
| GameRankings | N/A | 82% | 80% |

Review scores
| Publication | Score | | |
| Publication | Arcade | Dreamcast | PC |
|---|---|---|---|
| AllGame | 4.5/5 | 3.5/5 | N/A |
| CNET Gamecenter | N/A | 9/10 | N/A |
| Edge | N/A | (JP) 8/10 (EU) 7/10 | N/A |
| Electronic Gaming Monthly | N/A | 9.125/10 (Note: In Electronic Gaming Monthly's review of the Dreamcast version, one critic gave it 9.5/10, and the rest gave it each a score of 9/10.) | N/A |
| EP Daily | N/A | (JP) 9/10 (US) 7.5/10 | 8/10 |
| Famitsu | N/A | 36/40 | N/A |
| Game Informer | N/A | 7.5/10 | N/A |
| GameFan | N/A | (J.W.) 97% 81% (Note: In GameFan's viewpoint of the Dreamcast version, three critics gave it each a score of 60, 90, and 92.) | N/A |
| GameRevolution | N/A | B+ | N/A |
| GameSpot | N/A | 8.8/10 | N/A |
| GameSpy | N/A | 8.5/10 | N/A |
| IGN | N/A | 9/10 | N/A |
| Jeuxvideo.com | N/A | 17/20 | 15/20 |
| Next Generation | N/A | 3/5 | 3/5 |

The game received favorable reviews on both home platforms. Lamchop of GamePro said of the Dreamcast version in one review, "It looks and feels like the arcade version, and there's no slowdown at all even in two-player split screen mode. SR2 is worth at least a rental for Dreamcast owners who enjoy coin-op racing thrills on the comfort of their own couch." (Note: GamePro gave the Dreamcast version two 4.5/5 scores for graphics and fun factor, 3.5/5 for sound, and 4/5 for control in one review.) In another GamePro review, The D-Pad Destroyer said, "Rally fans and arcade racers will love this dirt-slidin' good time, but gamers weaned on the post-Gran Turismo racing revolution may wince at the game's archaic checkpoint system. Still, as far as rally racing goes on the Dreamcast, there really is nothing quite as fun as Sega Rally 2." (Note: GamePro gave the Dreamcast version 4.5/5 for graphics, and three 4/5 scores for sound, control, and fun factor in another review.) Jeff Lundrigan of NextGen said in its January 2000 issue that the same Dreamcast version "is not the sort of game you beat. Instead, it beats you." A year later, in its January 2001 issue, Jim Preston called the PC version "a fun and pretty arcade rally game that redirects the blood from your brain to your foot." In Japan, Famitsu gave the Dreamcast version a score of 36 out of 40.

European reception of the Dreamcast version was generally positive. British magazine Computer and Video Games awarded Sega Rally 2 five stars out of five, praising its arcade-style handling, visual presentation, changing weather conditions and expanded range of courses. French magazine Consoles+ awarded the game 95%, particularly praising its graphics, sound, playability and longevity.

German magazine MAN!AC gave the game 80 out of 100, praising its large number of courses and game modes, but criticising the computer-controlled opponents at higher difficulty levels as frustrating. Spanish magazine Revista Oficial Dreamcast awarded it 9 out of 10, praising its gameplay and technical presentation and describing it as an essential title for fans of driving games.

In Japan, Game Machine listed the arcade version in their April 15, 1998 issue as the most-successful dedicated arcade game of the month. The Dreamcast version was the best selling Dreamcast game in Japan during 1999, selling 290,000 units. A later compilation of Famitsu sales data recorded an estimated 374,885 copies sold in Japan. In North America, NPD sales figures reproduced by Blast Processing! recorded 145,942 copies sold by 2003. In the UK, it was the 2nd top selling Dreamcast launch game after Sonic Adventure. In February 2000, Sega España general manager José Ángel Sánchez also identified Sega Rally as one of the games receiving the strongest response from Spanish players, alongside Sonic Adventure and Soulcalibur. In Brazil, a 2004 ranking published by UOL placed Sega Rally 2 tenth among Tec Toy's best-selling Dreamcast games, although the title was listed as Sega Rally III.

In a 2016 retrospective, German magazine MAN!AC would revisit Sega Rally 2 when it ranked the game 25th among its 25 best Dreamcast games. While praising its demanding driving and expanded home-console content, the publication criticised the European PAL conversion for its unstable frame rate, large screen borders and occasional stuttering.
