= Takenobu Mitsuyoshi =

Japanese composer

- 光吉 猛修
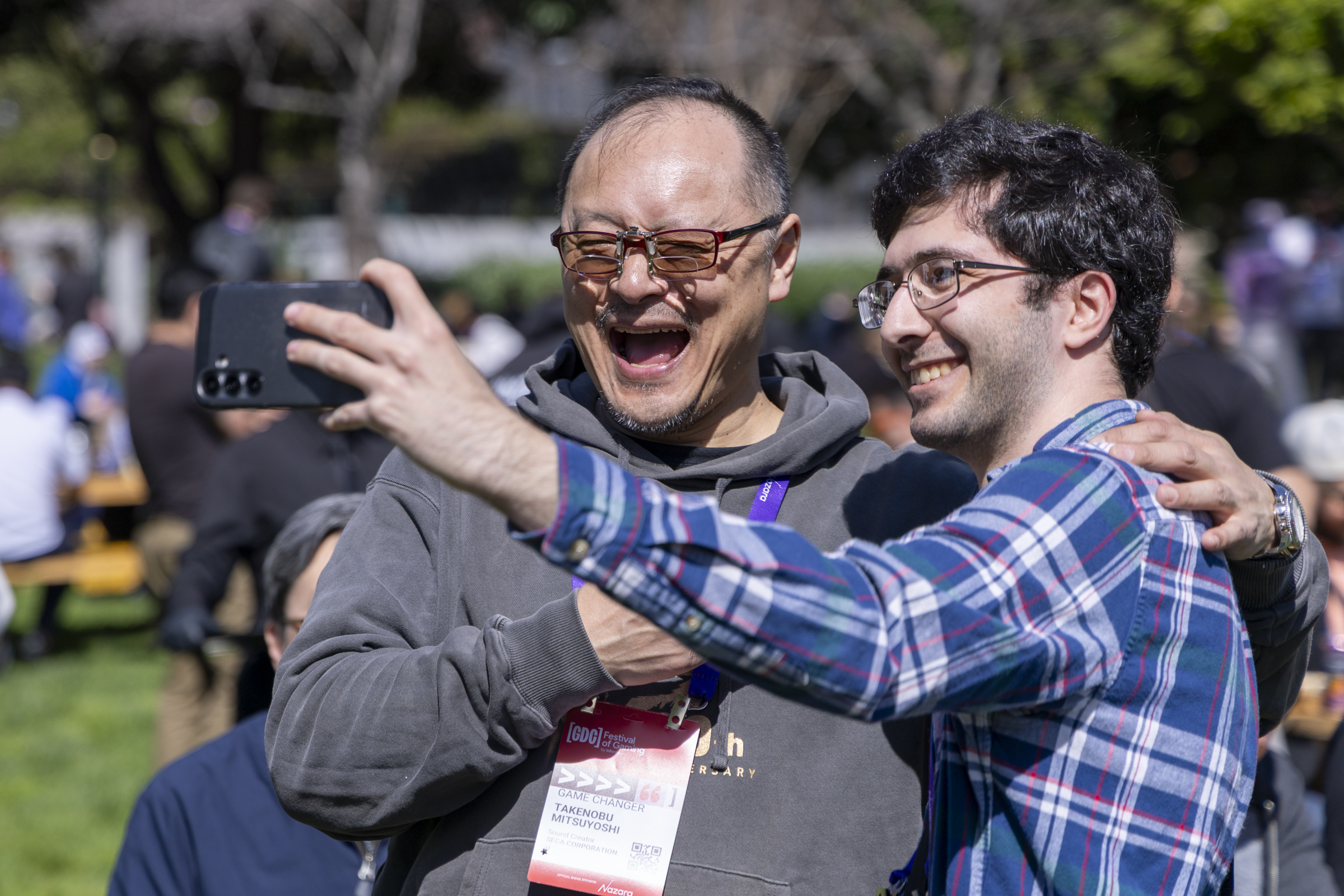
- Mitsuyoshi at the 2026 Game Developers Conference
- Born: December 25, 1967 (age 58); Fukuoka, Fukuoka, Japan
- Education: Tohoku Gakuin University
- Occupations: Composer; vocalist; keyboardist
- Years active: 1990–present
- Employer: Sega
- Musical career
- Genres: Chiptune; video game music; rock; jazz fusion
- Instruments: keyboards; vocals

Takenobu Mitsuyoshi (光吉 猛修, Mitsuyoshi Takenobu; born December 25, 1967) is a Japanese composer of video game music, singer, and video game voice actor. He has composed music for various games produced by Sega, including Virtua Fighter 2 and Shenmue. He first gained major recognition after the release of Daytona USA, for which he wrote music and personally sang vocals.

He also recorded live orchestras for the arcade games Derby Owners Club, World Club Champion Football, and Star Horse.

Aside from original compositions, he also arranges, provides vocals, and is a performer for various projects, including S.S.T from 1988 to 1993, and [H.] from 2004 onwards. He is well-known for voicing the character Kage-Maru in the Virtua Fighter franchise.

His younger brother, Kenji Mitsuyoshi (光吉 賢司, Mitsuyoshi Kenji), is a manga artist and member of the artist-writer duo Ark Performance along with Kōichi Ishikawa.

== Works ==
=== Video games ===
Year	Title	Role(s)
1990	G-LOC R360	"Earth Frame G"
1990	GP Rider	Music with Hiroshi Kawaguchi
1991	Rent a Hero	Music with Hiroshi Kawaguchi
1991	Strike Fighter	Music
1992	Virtua Racing	Music
1992	OutRunners	Music with Takayuki Nakamura
1994	Daytona USA	Music, vocals
1994	Virtua Fighter 2	Music with Takayuki Nakamura and Akiko Hashimoto
1994	Virtua Striker	Music
1995	Sega Rally Championship	Music
1995	Manx TT Superbike	Music
1995	Virtua Fighter Remix	Sound design
1996	Sonic the Fighters	Music with Maki Morrow
1996	Virtua Fighter Kids	Music with Takayuki Nakamura and Maki Morrow
1996	J.League Victory Goal '96	Musicians
1996	Virtua Fighter 3	Music with Fumio Ito and Hidenori Shoji
1997	Virtua Striker 2	Sound director
1997	Fighters Megamix	Sound design
1997	J.League Victory Goal '97	Musicians
1997	Digital Dance Mix Vol. 1 Namie Amuro	Sound director
1998	Daytona USA 2	Vocals
1998	Burning Rangers	Vocals
1999	Shenmue	Music with various others
2000	F355 Challenge: Passione Rossa	Music with various others
2001	Crackin' DJ Part 2	Music with various others
2001	Shenmue II	Music with various others
2002	World Club Champion Football	Music
2003	Cyber Troopers Virtual-On Marz	Sound design
2005	Sonic Gems Collection	"Fairy of A.I.F."
2006	Let's Go Jungle!: Lost on the Island of Spice	Music
2006	Sega Rally 2006	Music with various others
2009	Yakuza 3	Sound production
2009	Hummer	Music
2010	Yakuza 4	Interpretation assistance
2010	Let's Go Island: Lost on the Island of Tropics	Music with Junpei Mishima and Keisuke Tsukahara
2011	Ridge Racer	"Ridge Racer USA Mix" - DLC
2012	Maimai	Music with various others
2012	Samurai Bloodshow	Music
2015	Chunithm	"Ikazuchi"
2015	Hatsune Miku: Project Mirai DX	Motion actor
2017	Daytona 3 Championship USA	Music
2018	Super Smash Bros. Ultimate	"F-Zero Medley"
2021	Initial D The Arcade	"Super Sonic"
2022	Sin Chronicle	"A Reason of Unchosen"
2023	Sonic Superstars	"Golden Capital Zone Act 2", "Zap Scrap"
2024	Like a Dragon: Infinite Wealth	"Reminiscent Mood"
2026	Denshattack!	"Infinite Sky"

=== Voice acting ===
Year	Title	Role(s)
1993	Burning Rival	Bill
1993	Virtua Fighter	Akira Yuki, Kage-Maru
1996	Virtua Fighter 3	Kage-Maru
2001	Virtua Fighter 4	Kage-Maru
2003	Cyber Troopers Virtual-On Marz	Sgt. Hatter
2005	3rd Super Robot Wars Alpha: To the End of the Galaxy	Apharmd the Hatter
2006	Virtua Fighter 5	Kage-Maru
2012	Phantasy Star Online 2	Himself (English and Japanese)
2012	Sonic & All-Stars Racing Transformed	Announcer (Japanese)
2015	Project X Zone 2	Kage-Maru
2017	Sonic Mania	Competition Announcer
2022	Party Quiz Sega Q	Himself
2025	Shinobi: Art of Vengeance	Joe Musashi

== Concerts ==
Mitsuyoshi's music from Shenmue was performed live at the first Symphonic Game Music Concert in Leipzig, Germany, in 2003. It was the first time that a concert featuring video game music was held outside Japan.

Mitsuyoshi attended the world premiere of Play! A Video Game Symphony at the Rosemont Theater in Rosemont, Illinois, in May 2006, where music from the Shenmue series was performed by a full symphony orchestra. The event drew nearly 4,000 attendees.

In 2007, his music from the World Club Champion Football series was presented at the fifth Symphonic Game Music Concert, with him joining the choir during the performance.

For Symphonic Shades – Hülsbeck in Concert in 2008, Takenobu Mitsuyoshi arranged music from Apidya, by German composer Chris Hülsbeck. The event was performed by the WDR Radio Orchestra Cologne in Cologne, Germany, and marked the first live radio broadcast of a video game music concert.

His first dinner show was scheduled for March 22, 2020, but was postponed to August 23 of that year due to the COVID-19 pandemic, and then rescheduled again to January 24, 2021, due to the spread of the second wave of infection. He did an online dinner show livestream on August 23, 2020, to make room for the reschedule.
