= Daytona USA 2001 =

2000 video game

- Japanese cover art
- Developers: Amusement Vision; Genki
- Publishers: Sega: JP/NA: Hasbro Interactive; EU: Infogrames
- Directors: Yoshinari Sunazuka; Kenji Ōta
- Producer: Toshihiro Nagoshi
- Composers: Keiichi Sugiyama; Naofumi Hataya; Tatsuyuki Maeda; Junko Shiratsu; Hideaki Kobayashi; Hirofumi Murasaki
- Series: Daytona USA
- Platform: Dreamcast
- Release: JP: December 21, 2000; NA: March 13, 2001; EU: May 11, 2001; AU: July 13, 2002
- Genre: Racing
- Modes: Single-player, multiplayer

Daytona USA 2001, released in North America as Daytona USA, is a 2000 racing video game developed by Amusement Vision and Genki for the Dreamcast. It is a complete revamp of Daytona USA (1994), featuring every course from the original game and Daytona USA: Championship Circuit Edition (1996), as well as three new tracks. Daytona USA 2001 also introduced a Championship mode, where the player must place above a certain point in the overall rankings to progress, culminating in the King of Daytona Cup.

The game's graphics were significantly updated from previous home installments of Daytona USA, more resembling that of Daytona USA 2. It also featured support for online play, allowing for competition between up to four players and uploading/downloading of best times and ghost car information, although the online options were removed from the PAL version.

The Dreamcast's online servers for Daytona USA 2001 were taken down permanently by mistake as a result of the developers hard-coding the IP-address to the servers in the game and Sega giving away a network block that belonged to AT&T. Online services for the game were unofficially restored by fans through private servers in 2023.

== Gameplay ==
Daytona USA 2001 retains three tracks from Daytona USA and two from Daytona USA: Championship Circuit Edition, while adding three new and exclusive circuits. All of them can be played in four variants: mirror, mirror reverse, reverse and normal. Several game modes are available: single race, championship, time trial and 2 players with split screen. Only four cars can be used at the start, with the possibility of unlocking more as the progress is made.

== Music ==
The courses taken from Daytona USA: Championship Circuit Edition do not have their original themes; instead, new songs are used in place of Funk Fair, The Noisy Roars of Wilderness, and Pounding Pavement. Race to the Bass and the Daytona USA Medley do not appear either. The new songs are not given names in-game, and with the lack of an official soundtrack CD it is assumed they are named after their respective courses.

In addition to the above themes, Daytona USA 2001 also features different remixed music for the mirror and mirror-reversed versions of the courses. Theme music from the original Daytona USA arcade machine is selected at random and used as title screen music - these songs can be found in the Sound Test from track 48 onwards.

== Reception ==
Reception

Aggregate score
Aggregator	Score
Metacritic	86/100

Review scores
Publication	Score
AllGame	4/5
Edge	8/10
Electronic Gaming Monthly	9/10 (Note: Three critics of Electronic Gaming Monthly gave the game each a score of 9/10.)
EP Daily	8/10
Eurogamer	7/10
Famitsu	34/40
Game Informer	7/10
GameRevolution	B−
GameSpot	8.6/10
GameSpy	7.5/10
IGN	9.3/10
Next Generation	3/5
Maxim	8/10

The game received "favorable" reviews according to the review aggregation website Metacritic. Randy Nelson of NextGen said, "It's definitely not very deep, but for sheer arcade thrills, Daytona USA dutifully delivers." In Japan, Famitsu gave it a score of 31 out of 40. Dan Electro of GamePro called it "an admirably wide rear-view mirror of Sega's series, and it shows why the Daytona games still conjure up fond memories for arcade racing fans. If you ever loved Daytona USA, this one is worth picking up." (Note: GamePro gave the game 4.5/5 for graphics, two 3.5/5 scores for sound and fun factor, and 4/5 for control.)
