= Apidya =

1992 video game

- Cover art
- Developer: Kaiko
- Publishers: Blue Byte (original; as Play Byte); Markt+Technik (Germany); Team17 (re-release) >br> ININ Games (remake)
- Designers: Peter Thierolf, Kai Teuber, Matthias Enzmann
- Artists: Frank Matzke, Rudolf Stember, Ralf Leonhardt
- Composer: Chris Hülsbeck
- Platform: Amiga
- Release: 20 April 1992 (original); May 1992 (Germany); June 1994 (re-release); 25 August 2026 (remake)
- Genre: Shoot 'em up
- Modes: Single-player, multiplayer

Apidya (titled Abidja (アビヂャ) in Japanese characters below the title) is a horizontally scrolling shoot 'em up video game developed by German studio Kaiko and released by Blue Byte (as Play Byte) in 1992 for the Amiga. The game was also released by the disk magazine Amiga Spiele Disc, and later as a budget game by Team17 in 1994.

A 24-bit pixel remake, Apidya' Special, was developed by Stefan Becker (fl_cody) in collaboration with Kaiko (as "Team Apidya") and released by ININ Games on August 25, 2026.

== Gameplay ==
The first level of the game

The game is a horizontally scrolling shooter, with some elements similar to early, classic shoot 'em ups. The story revolves around Ikuro, whose wife Yuri has been poisoned by Hexaä, an evil lord of black magic. Ikuro uses magic to transform into a deadly bee and vows to find an antidote for Yuri and wreak revenge on Hexaä.

The player controls a bee (Ikuro) capable of launching a number of projectiles which can damage or destroy enemy targets. The game uses the power-up bar system pioneered by Gradius. Destroyed enemies sometimes leave a power-up in the form of a red-and-yellow flower. The player may collect these flowers and activate new weapons and enhancements. A 'build-up' weapon, similar to the 'beam' weapon in R-Type, also features. If the fire button is held down for a second or two, the bee produces a hissing noise and releasing the fire button will then cause the bee to fire a large, organic projectile (a giant bee stinger) which can wipe out waves of small enemies, or damage larger ones.

If the player's bee is hit by enemy fire or crashes into the terrain, a life will be lost and the current stage is restarted except for the end bosses of the first 3 stages, that will continue till all lives are lost. Once all lives are lost the game ends. A co-operative two-player mode is possible, in which the second player controls a smaller companion drone, which can launch small projectiles and shield the first player. The drone can sustain 5 small projectiles per life but won't survive large projectiles or collisions and the stage doesn't reset if it dies, the large bee is the alpha which must survive to advance. The alpha bee dying resets the stage as with normal play minus end stage bosses for the first 3 stages. An alternating two player mode is also possible.

The game consists of five themed levels: a meadow, a pond, a sewer filled with mutated enemies, a bio-technological machine and a final level where the player must battle five final bosses. The final level offers plenty of points for slain enemies, offering a semi status quo for players as they will recover some lost lives from restarting the level. Each level is divided up into a number of stages (usually three where the last is the end boss, that doesn't reset upon losing a life only on credit). There is also a number of hidden bonus levels. In the first two levels, nearly all the enemies are real creatures which may be found in a meadow or pond. The later levels feature mutant and inorganic creations. During "Techno Party", the bee morphs into a more mechanized form for the duration of that level. The first boss in "Techno Party" is unique as it cannot be harmed, so the player must survive until it vacates the game.

There are four difficulty settings. When the difficulty is set to "easy", it is not possible to play the last level, the ending sequence is skipped and the player is directed straight to the end credits.

== Development ==
Apidya began development in 1991, following the success of their previous game Gem'X. The game was produced by Thomas Hertzler and Lothar Schmitt, and designed by programmers Peter Thierolf, Kai Teuber and Matthias Enzmann, and graphics artists Frank Matzke, Rudolf Stember and Ralf Leonhardt. It was originally planned as a space shooter, with the codename Beyond the Planet, but was changed when Matzke came up with the idea for an insect theme, basing the first two levels on books about plants and insects. The name "Apidya" was derived from the Greek "Hexapoda", which refers to six-legged insects. The intro and ending cutscenes and title screen use anime-style graphics and characters inspired by Matzke's interest in manga culture. Despite being labelled "II" in the title, Thierolf stated that Apidya was not a sequel to any game, but had the digits placed there simply as a joke. Kaiko had trouble completing the game due to financial problems, so they decided to make some covermount games, The Adventures of Quik & Silva, Metal Law and Super Gem'Z, for magazines in order to get the funds. They published the game under their own name for the European release, while in the worldwide release they still used the name A.U.D.I.O.S (Art Under Design, Imaginations Of Sound). An Atari ST port was in development, but was never finished. The game's cover art for its 1994 budget release was done by Kevin Jenkins.

The game's soundtrack was composed by musician Chris Huelsbeck. A high-quality arrangement of the soundtrack was released as a CD album in 1992. The soundtrack of level 4 features several samples from L.A. Style's "James Brown Is Dead".

There have also been live performances of the game's music:

- An Apidya suite was performed live by a full symphonic orchestra in 2003 at the Symphonic Game Music Concert series in Leipzig, Germany.
- Music from Apidya was played as part of the 2006 Play! A Video Game Symphony concert in Stockholm, Sweden.
- In 2008, music from the game (as well as many of Hülsbeck's other works) was played by the WDR Funkhausorchester at Symphonic Shades – Hülsbeck in Concert, and included on the album of the same name.
- In 2020, music from Apidya was featured on the compilation album Amiga Power: The Album with Attitude.
- In 2017, music from Apidya was featured on the tribute album Project Paula: Amiga, performed and mixed by Volkor X.

== Reception ==
The game was largely praised as a fine example of the shoot 'em up genre. Amiga Power described the game as offering "more playability than any other shoot 'em up" and awarded the game 89% in 1992. Amiga Format awarded the game 90%.

== Legacy ==
An unofficial Windows remake of the first level of Apidya was released in 2002, followed by an unofficial technical demo for the Game Boy Advance in 2007 years later, but neither were ever completed.
