= Play! A Video Game Symphony =

Concert series featuring video game music

PLAY! concert series logo

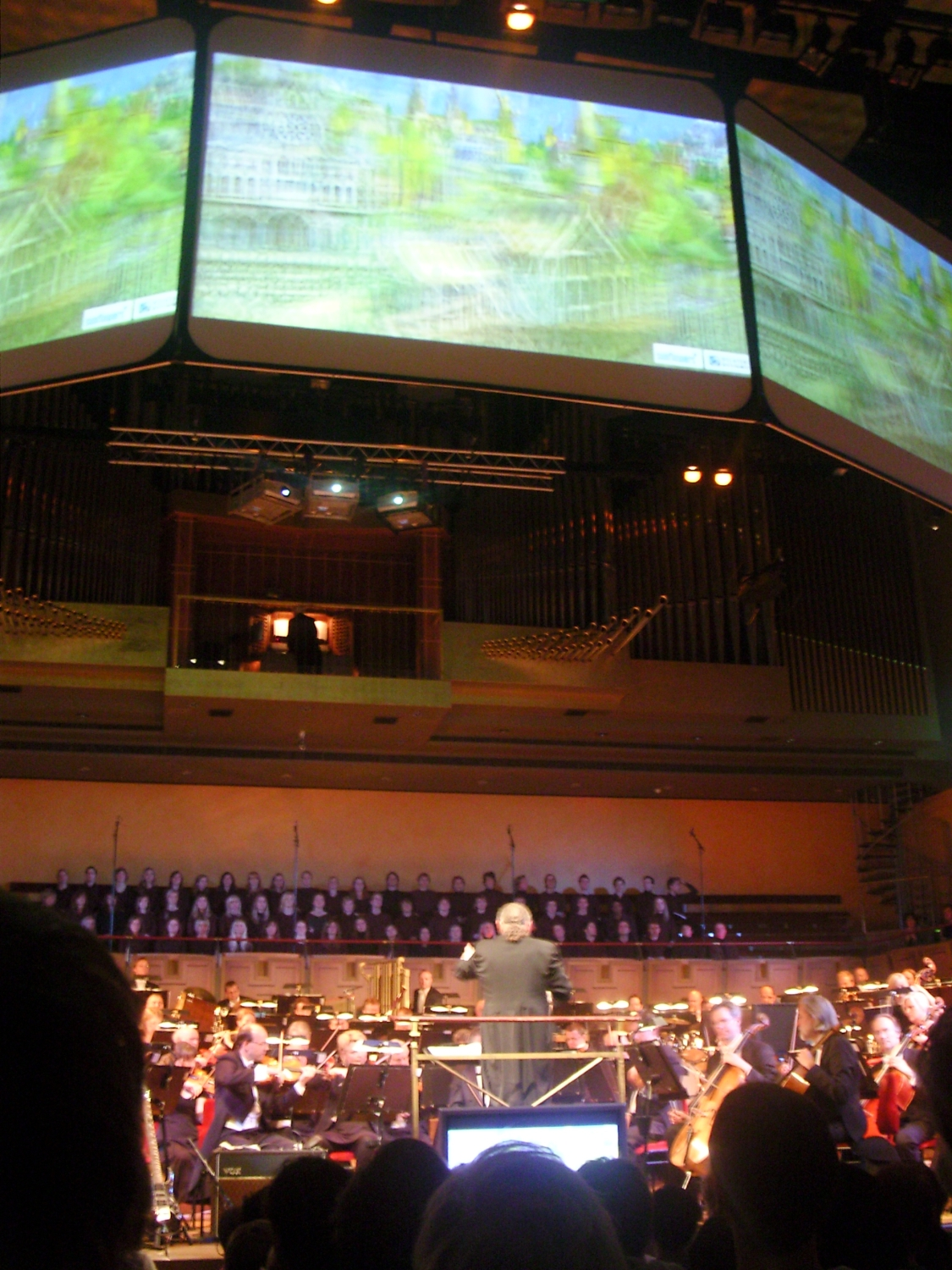
"Play! A video game symphony V": Anno 1701 soundtrack (2 June 2007)

PLAY! A Video Game Symphony was a concert series that featured music from video games performed by a live orchestra. The concerts from 2006 to 2010 were conducted by Arnie Roth. From 2010, Andy Brick took the position of principal conductor and music director. Play! was replaced by the Replay: Symphony of Heroes concert series.

== History ==
In 2004, Jason Michael Paul was approached by Square Enix to organize a concert for music from its Final Fantasy series. After the concert sold out in a few days, Paul decided to turn video game music concerts into a series. Arnie Roth, who had previously conducted the Dear Friends - Music from Final Fantasy and More Friends: Music from Final Fantasy concerts, was selected to conduct the concerts. Andy Brick, who had previously conducted the Symphonic Game Music Concerts, was chosen as the associate conductor. The concerts are performed by local symphony players and choirs.

Play! premiered on May 27, 2006 at the Rosemont Theater in Rosemont, Illinois. The premiere show featured performances by Koji Kondo, Angela Aki, and Akira Yamaoka, and composers Nobuo Uematsu, Yasunori Mitsuda, Yuzo Koshiro and Jeremy Soule were in attendance.

== Concerts ==
Each concert features segments of video game music performed by a live orchestra and choir, with video footage from the games shown on three screens. An opening fanfare, written by Nobuo Uematsu, is performed at each show. Music from all video game eras is performed at the shows.

According to Paul, the show is a "straightforward music program," designed "to keep the arts alive in a way that is classy."

=== Performed music ===
Music from the following games has been performed at Play!:

- ActRaiser
- Apidya
- Battlefield
- Black
- Blue Dragon
- Castlevania
- Chrono Cross
- Chrono Trigger
- Commodore 64-Medley
- Commodore Amiga-Medley
- Daytona USA
- Dragon Age: Origins
- Dreamfall
- Final Fantasy
- Guild Wars
- Halo
- Kingdom Hearts
- Lost Odyssey
- Metal Gear Solid
- Prey
- Shadow of the Colossus
- Shenmue
- Silent Hill
- Sonic the Hedgehog
- Stella Deus
- Super Mario Bros.
- Super Mario World
- The Chronicles of Riddick: Escape from Butcher Bay
- The Darkness
- The Elder Scrolls III: Morrowind
- The Elder Scrolls IV: Oblivion
- The Legend of Zelda
- The Revenge of Shinobi
- Ys
- World of Warcraft

== Album ==
On January 9, 2009, a live album CD and DVD of the concert was released. It was recorded in Prague and was performed by the Czech Philharmonic Chamber Orchestra.

Track listing
No.	Title	Length
1.	"PLAY! Opening Fanfare"	2:12
2.	"Commodore 64 Medley"	8:24
3.	"Castlevania"	6:52
4.	"Sonic the Hedgehog"	6:41
5.	"Chrono Cross"	4:45
6.	"Silent Hill 2"	2:58
7.	"Halo"	7:28
8.	"Kingdom Hearts"	4:41
9.	"Battlefield"	6:42
10.	"World of Warcraft"	7:40
11.	"The Elder Scrolls IV: Oblivion"	9:16
12.	"Guild Wars"	6:56
Total length:		74:35

== Reception and legacy ==
The concerts have been well received. Audiences regularly give standing ovations after each song. Jeremy Soule, composer of the music for The Elder Scrolls IV: Oblivion, said that he "consider[s] 'Play' to be the ultimate video-game surround system."

According to Paul, Play! helps to promote the work of composers, as well as "lend credibility to the genre of video-game music." Roth stated that the concerts help to also push the classical industry forward and to "draw new audiences." According to Soule, video game concerts can help to educate old generations "that game music isn't just a bunch of bleeps and bloops." One associate conductor stated that the performance crosses the generational gap, bringing together older and younger generations.

== See also ==
- Dear Friends: Music from Final Fantasy
- Symphonic Game Music Concert
- Tour de Japon
- Orchestral Game Concert
- Video Games Live
- Gamer Symphony Orchestra at the University of Maryland
