= Indy 500 (1995 video game) =

1995 video game

- Arcade flyer
- Developer: Sega AM1
- Publisher: Sega
- Platform: Arcade
- Release: July 1995
- Genre: Racing
- Modes: Single-player, multiplayer
- Arcade system: Sega Model 2

Indy 500 is a 1995 arcade racing game developed by Sega AM1. Based on the IndyCar Series, the game possesses a license from the Indianapolis Motor Speedway, home of the Indianapolis 500, and includes the speedway as one of its courses. Indy 500 was AM1's second game developed using 3D computer graphics and their first to utilize color textures. While planned as a Model 3 arcade system board release, delays in the hardware's completion led to use of the Model 2 instead. A Sega Saturn port was planned, but later canceled. Reception to Indy 500 was mixed, with some critical comparison to other games such as Sega AM2's Daytona USA and Namco's Ace Driver and Rave Racer.

== Gameplay ==
An IndyCar, controlled by the player, drives around the Indianapolis Motor Speedway.

Indy 500 is a racing game based on IndyCar, and possesses an official license from the Indianapolis Motor Speedway. Players can race one of three courses: Indianapolis Motor Speedway (called Indy 500 in the game), Highland Raceway, and Bayside Street, the latter two being fictitious courses. The race commences after the user has made their choice of automatic transmission or manual transmission with a 2-position shifter, capable of selecting 6 speeds. Special features of the cabinet include a steering wheel with haptic feedback. Similar to previous Sega arcade racing games, the game can be played from one of four different camera angles.

Each race begins with a rolling start, and players are tasked with racing against opponents and a timed event, which can be a standard 3-lap race or an extended (Long Race Mode) race, varying between 16 and 20 laps (depending on the course selected), needing to make it to the next checkpoint before the timer ends. Racing speeds are up to 380 kilometres per hour (240 mph), and up to 420 km/h (260 mph) while in a slipstream. Up to eight players can compete in multiplayer, via a feature where multiple arcade cabinets can be linked. A hidden feature in the game allows players to race as the pace car.

== Development and release ==
Indy 500 was developed by Sega AM1, an arcade research and development division of Sega led by Rikiya Nakagawa. The game was AM1's second project using 3D computer graphics, after 1994's Wing War. According to Nakagawa, Indy 500 was the first time AM1 was able to develop color textures and gave the team experience in developing games in 3D. For this reason, Nakagawa credits the game as his most memorable project with AM1. The game was originally developed for the Sega Model 3 arcade board, but due to delays in the board's development it was instead released on the Sega Model 2, specifically the Model 2B variant first used in Sega Rally Championship.

Indy 500 was released in Japan in July 1995, and to other regions by the end of the year. The development team behind the Sega Saturn version of Sega Rally Championship were planning to do a Saturn conversion of Indy 500, and a Saturn port was announced, but due to fan demand they were taken off of the project and put to work on Daytona USA: Championship Circuit Edition instead.

== Reception ==
Reception

Review scores
Publication	Score
Computer and Video Games	3 / 5
Next Generation	4/5
Super GamePower (BR)	5.0 / 5
Player One (FR)	90%
Sega Pro	75 / 100

In Japan, Game Machine listed Indy 500 in their September 1, 1995 issue as being the second most popular dedicated arcade game of the month. However, according to an article published in Edge a few months after the game's release in Japan, "... reaction to the game in Japan has been relatively muted so far, with Namco's impressive Rave Racer attracting a lot more players".

Critical reception to Indy 500 was mixed, but often compared the game to other similar arcade releases and focused on graphics and gameplay. French magazine Player One praised the game's graphics and stated that Indy 500 continued a racing tradition with Sega that began with Virtua Racing and continued with Daytona USA and Sega Rally Championship. Brazilian magazine Super GamePower praised the game in comparison to others, calling both Daytona USA and Sega Rally Championship an appetizer for Indy 500. In an article for Edge, the staff pointed out that Indy 500's graphics were not as high quality as those in Namco's Ace Driver, which had been released the previous year. Specifically, Indy 500's graphics lack Gouraud shading. A reviewer for Computer and Video Games stated that Indy 500's main goal was to bring the fastest speeds ever in an arcade racing game, up to 380 km/h. They compared the game to Daytona USA and stated that Indy 500 is a more realistic game, but lacks in both graphics and gameplay compared to Daytona and Rave Racer. By contrast, a Next Generation reviewer praised the game's graphics and effective simulation of the unique qualities of IndyCar racing, calling Indy 500 "the fastest simulated driving experience ever", but also remarked that the infrequency of powerslides makes the game less fun. Sega Pro reviewer Steve Hardy also praised the game's graphics, but was critical of the gameplay and suggested that players play Sega Rally Championship instead for more excitement. He expressed disappointment that Indy 500's course selection offered nothing out of the ordinary.

== See also ==
- Daytona USA 2
