= Symphonic Shades – Hülsbeck in Concert =

2008 symphonic tribute concert

Symphonic Shades: Hülsbeck in Concert
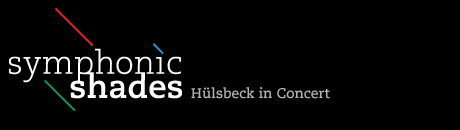
- Orchestra: WDR Rundfunkorchester Köln
- Choir: Filmharmonic Choir Prague
- Conductor: Arnie Roth
- Composer: Chris Hülsbeck
- Arrangers: Jonne Valtonen, Yuzo Koshiro, Takenobu Mitsuyoshi
- Venue: Köln (Germany), Funkhaus Wallrafplatz
- Album recording: Symphonic Shades
- Date: 23 August 2008
- Guests: Chris Hülsbeck, Yuzo Koshiro, Takenobu Mitsuyoshi
- Supporting acts: Jari Salmela, Rony Barrak
- Producer: Thomas Böcker (Merregnon Studios)

Böcker concert chronology
- Fifth Symphonic Game Music Concert (August 22, 2007); Symphonic Shades (August 23, 2008); Symphonic Fantasies (2009, 2012, 2016)

Symphonic Shades: Hülsbeck in Concert was a symphonic tribute concert held twice in Cologne, Germany on 23 August 2008 featuring video game music. The concert was held in honor of the German-born video-game composer Chris Hülsbeck, and featured orchestral arrangements exclusively based on Hülsbeck's works throughout his 22-year-long career. The concert was produced and directed by Thomas Böcker, with the majority of arrangements provided by Finnish composer and musician Jonne Valtonen, and with contributions by Japanese video-game composers Yuzo Koshiro, Takenobu Mitsuyoshi, and additional assistance from Adam Klemens.

The concert was performed by The WDR Radio Orchestra Cologne and the FILMharmonic Choir under conduction from Arnie Roth, with guest performers Rony Barrak and Jari Salmela joining the orchestra at numerous occasions throughout the night. Symphonic Shades became the very first video game orchestra concert in history to be broadcast live on radio.

Symphonic Shades marked the beginning of a series of concerts held in principally at the Cologne Philharmonic Hall, and would spawn 3 direct successor concerts, as well as branch out into numerous side shows.

== Concerts ==
=== Production ===
In late 2007, Thomas Böcker announced that he is producing Symphonic Shades, a concert exclusively dedicated to the music of Chris Hülsbeck, taking place on 23 August 2008. The WDR Radio Orchestra Cologne was chosen to perform due to Winfried Fechner, manager of the WDR Radio Orchestra Cologne, wanting to gauge the interest of a new young audience in classical music through the use of video game music after having personally attended Fifth Symphonic Game Music Concert.

Symphonic Shades would differ from the previous concert series produced by Böcker, the Symphonic Game Music Concerts. While Symphonic Game Music Concerts was a continuation of the conventional orchestra game music concerts originated by Koichi Sugiyama in 1991 with the Orchestral Game Concerts series, Symphonic Shades focused on one specific composer in its entirety, which was a very uncommon concept for video game orchestra concerts at the time, and the first of its kind in Europe. The use of specific themes would be utilized in all subsequent Symphonic shows produced by Böcker and his Merregnon Studios.

Böcker stated the reason to focus on Hülsbeck was due to his own childhood memories of the composer's music, his value to the German fans and for being a true "melody maker" in the same vein as Nobuo Uematsu. The name of the concert was inspired by Hülsbeck's first noted composition, "Shades", which launched his video game career after being featured in the German magazine 64'er in 1986. A website was set up for the concert, providing news updates, interviews and other announcements leading up to the day of the show.

Having worked together since 2000, Böcker positioned Jonne Valtonen to be lead arranger for the show, orchestrating all the pieces to be featured throughout the concert. On April 21 of 2008, It was announced on the official website that legendary SEGA composer Yuzo Koshiro would be present at the concert and provide an arrangement of Jim Power in Mutant Planet. On May 28, Takenobu Mitsuyoshi was announced to be attendance and provide his arrangement for Apidya. Both Koshiro and Mitsuyoshi had worked with Böcker in the past, with Koshiro providing a track alongside Valtonen on the Merregnon project in 2004, while Mitsuyoshi recorded the music for WCCF with the assistance of Böcker and Valtonen in Prague during 2007.

Though some of Hülsbeck's music had been featured in the Symphonic Game Music Concerts and Valtonen having provided an arrangement of Turrican as a part of a medley featuring Amiga video game music for PLAY! previously, Symphonic Shades featured all new exclusive arrangements using a more experimental approach, while also referring to Hülsbeck's own personal interpretations more extensively.

Tickets for Symphonic Shades were sold out after six days, prompting the producers to schedule a second concert that would be performed to another sold-out audience at 23:00 on the same day of the Symphonic Shades world premiere.

The artwork for the concert was provided by Hitoshi Ariga, most noted for his work on the Rockman manga series and The Big O.

=== Shows ===
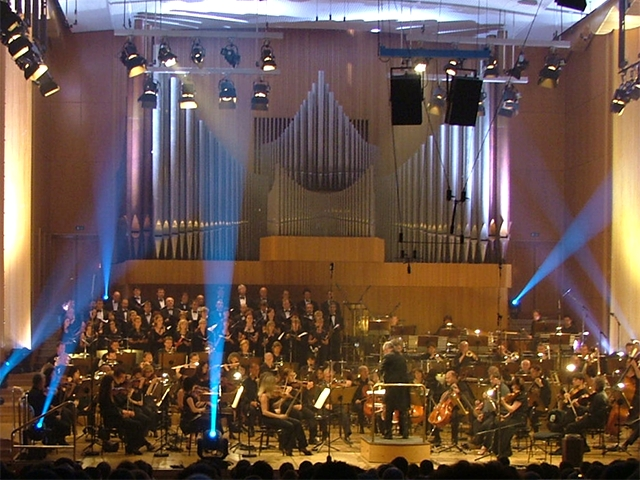
The WDR Radio Orchestra Cologne and the FILMharmonic Choir performing Symphonic Shades

The two concerts were held back to back on August 23, 2008. The first performance took place at 20:00 and the second at 23:00 local time at the Funkhaus Wallrafplatz in downtown Cologne. Both concerts were preceded by a Meet and Greet session with the guest of honor Chris Hülsbeck, Yuzo Koshiro and Takenobu Mitsuyoshi. The concert featured 14 titles selected from Chris Hülsbeck's library of titles throughout his career, including his most famous works The Great Giana Sisters, Turrican II: The Final Fight, as well as lesser known works from the short movie soundtrack Licht am Ende des Tunnels and the original concert composition Karawane der Elefanten. Arrangements ranged from many different styles, having influences of jazz, big band, cinema, concertos and experimental electronic soundscapes combined with the orchestra. The Finnish pianist Jari Salmela took the stage twice, first during a solo piano performance for Turrican 3 - Payment Day, and a second time accompanied by the orchestra for the finale, Turrican II. Rony Barrak provided Darbuka percussion for the Tunnel B1 suite.

Most of the arrangements featured a grand bombastic sound due to Hülsbeck's strong influence from classic science fiction films and fiction. Mitsuyoshi wrote lyrics in Japanese for the choir accompanied with strong brass sections in his Apidya arrangement, wanting to make his arrangement very emotionally effective. Koshiro arranged his given material in an impressionist classical style similar to 19th century Johannes Brahms and Anton Bruckner, reminiscent of his previous work in Actraiser. Several unique elements were used to create a rich sound, some by using an emulated C64 backing track recorded by Hülsbeck himself for Symphonic Shades piece, while Gem'X made use of ceramic cups. Hülsbeck noted that the original composition Karawane der Elefanten came to be while he experimented with oriental gamut and Egyptian melodies, and began to imagine elephants walking through the desert.

During certain intervals, German moderator Matthias Opdenhövel would inform the audience on the background and origin for the upcoming pieces to be performed, as well as provide commentary on Hülsbeck's illustrious career. Like Symphonic Game Music Concerts before it, Symphonic Shades made minimal use of stage show elements, opting not to make use of video screens or other forms of imagery. A small amount of light production was used to create atmosphere in the concert hall. Each concert ran at approx. 80 minutes. The event marked the first live radio broadcast of a video game music concert, broadcast on the WDR4 station. Despite being a German production based on a German composer, the concert had attendees from Japan, Finland, Sweden and Norway.

=== Set List ===
1. "Grand Monster Slam (Opening Fanfare)"
2. "X-Out (Main Theme)"
3. "Jim Power in Mutant Planet (Main Theme)"
4. "Tower of Babel"
5. "Turrican 3 – Payment Day (Piano Suite)"
6. "Gem’X (Main Theme)"
7. "Apidya II (Suite)"
8. "R-Type (Main Theme)"
9. "Licht am Ende des Tunnels (Suite)"
10. "Tunnel B1 (Suite)"
11. "Symphonic Shades"
12. "Karawane der Elefanten"
13. "Turrican II – The Final Fight (Renderings: Main Theme)"

=== Reception ===
Symphonic Shades: Hülsbeck in Concert was met with universal praise and positive reception from both critics and fans. The concert was followed by a several minute standing ovation. Johan Köhn of LEVEL Magazine in Sweden stated that the concert was "magnificent", Denis Brown of ONLINEWELTEN.com called the concert a "great gift not only to Chris Hülsbeck, but also to his fans", Andreas Altenheimer of demonews.de stated "I have rarely heard such well functioning transitions within medleys, as in Symphonic Shades.", Robert Dietrich of Stereology recalled that "thunderous applause and standing ovation" from the audience went on for so long that Arnie Roth had to stop the cheering crowd due to another concert being scheduled 30 minutes later., and Andreas Hackl stated at Square Enix Music Online that despite not being familiar with the material prior to the concert, the show was "definitely worth it". During an interview with freelance writer Audun Sorlie, Sorlie stated that even though he had stepped off the plane only few hours before the concert and made it in the door 2 minutes prior to the event, it was one of the most "personal and important experiences" in his life to pay tribute to one of his childhood heroes.

Winfried Fechner was overwhelmed by the success of Symphonic Shades, and immediately green-lit another production to be done in cooperation with Merregnon Studios for 2009. The 2009 concert would later be revealed to be Symphonic Fantasies and focus on the biggest titles from game developer Square Enix.

Chris Hülsbeck himself stated the concert was a personal highlight for him, and the "defining moment" of his life. A visibly emotional and touched Hülsbeck could be seen at the concert itself, and after returning to his home in San Francisco, he wrote an open letter thanking the fans as well as the WDR and Merregnon Studios for all the support, noting the concert exceeded all his expectations and that he would be eternally grateful for the tribute.

=== Sinfonia Drammatica ===
On 4 August 2009, eight pieces of Symphonic Shades were performed by the Royal Stockholm Philharmonic Orchestra at the concert Sinfonia Drammatica in the Stockholm Concert Hall, along with titles of drammatica by Yoko Shimomura, uniquely combining works of a single Japanese and Western game music composer in one concert. For this occasion, Jonne Valtonen slightly revised his version of the Turrican II main theme. In a review Original Sound Version stated: "No lasers, no smoke machines, no backing track and no display screen with footage of the games. This was what I was hoping for: a serious concert that even people without game knowledge could appreciate. [...] Sinfonia Drammatica was awesome."

Additionally, the Duisburg Philharmonic performed nine arrangements from Symphonic Shades at their 3. Familienkonzert on 3 December 2009. Both Hülsbeck and Shimomura expressed hope that Sinfonia Drammatica could open the door for them and other composers from across borders to work together on music in the future.

== CD ==
On December 17, 2008, a concert recording was released by Chris Hülsbeck's own label synSONIQ Records. It contains live material from the concert that is complemented by recordings before and after the public performances. The first print of the CD was a collector's edition limited to 1000 copies and was sold out at the main retailer less than a month after the initial release. In order to ensure continuous availability of the recording, digital releases on iTunes and Amazon followed the CD, of which a second print was released on 20 May 2009. Unlike the limited collector's edition, the second print is lower in price and is shipped in standard CD trays, but still contains the booklet included with the first 1000 copies of the album, though with normal printing rather than a matte/gloss coating effect on the cover. The CD is as of 2011 entirely out of print, though the album is still available digitally on Amazon and iTunes.
