= Symphonic Shades – Hülsbeck in Concert (album) =

2008 live music album

Symphonic Shades: Hülsbeck in Concert

Live album by WDR Radio Orchestra Cologne, FILMharmonic Choir Prague, Jari Salmela, Rony Barrak, Benyamin Nuss
- Released: 17 December 2008
- Recorded: 23 August 2008
- Genre: Classical, Video game music
- Length: 74:32
- Label: synSONIQ Records
- Producer: Thomas Böcker, Jan Zottmann

Symphonic Shades - Hülsbeck in Concert is an album featuring a mastered and mixed recording of the concert of the same name, held in Cologne, Germany at the Funkhaus Wallrafplatz on August 23, 2008. It features music composed by German video game composer Chris Hülsbeck, arranged and orchestrated by Jonne Valtonen, Yuzo Koshiro and Takenobu Mitsuyoshi. In addition to live recordings, the album also features new studio recordings of the piano piece Turrican 3, performed by Benyamin Nuss in his first collaborative effort with Merregnon Studios. The concert was also broadcast live on radio, marking the first time a video game concert has been broadcast on air.

The artwork for the album was provided by Hitoshi Ariga, most noted for his work on the Rockman manga series and The Big O.

== Versions ==
The original release was done in a limited quantity of 1000 copies, and sold out from its main retailer MAZ-Audio within a single month. The first print came in a deluxe jewel case, with a premium matte booklet that features photography from the concert taken by Philippe Ramakers and Thomas Böcker personally, as well as extensive liner notes and an interview with Chris Hülsbeck, conducted by Matthias Oborski.

Due to the overwhelming continued demand and interest from fans, a second print was issued on May 29, 2009. This version came with the same content, though now produced with standard jewel casing and booklet paper. As of 2011, both the first and second print of the CD is completely out of print.

To enable continued availability of the album, a digital release is available on iTunes and Amazon.

== Track listing ==
#	Track name	Performer	Arranger (Additional assistance)	Length
1.	"Grand Monster Slam (Opening Fanfare)"	"WDR Radio Orchestra"	"Jonne Valtonen"	2:47
2.	"X-Out (Main Theme)"	"WDR Radio Orchestra" "FILMharmonic Choir Prague"	"Jonne Valtonen"	5:13
3.	"Jim Power in »Mutant Planet« (Main Theme)"	"WDR Radio Orchestra"	"Yuzo Koshiro"	5:13
4.	"Tower of Babel"	"WDR Radio Orchestra"	"Jonne Valtonen"	4:41
5.	"Turrican 3 – Payment Day (Piano Suite)"	"Benyamin Nuss"	"Jonne Valtonen"	5:20
6.	"Gem’X (Main Theme)"	"WDR Radio Orchestra"	"Jonne Valtonen	3:42
7.	"Apidya II (Suite)"	"WDR Radio Orchestra" "FILMharmonic Choir Prague"	"Takenobu Mitsuyoshi" (Adam Klemens)	5:27
8.	"R-Type (Main Theme)"	"WDR Radio Orchestra" "FILMharmonic Choir Prague"	"Jonne Valtonen"	5:20
9.	"Licht am Ende des Tunnels (Suite)"	"WDR Radio Orchestra" "FILMharmonic Choir Prague"	"Jonne Valtonen"	5:11
10.	"The Great Giana Sisters (Suite)"	"WDR Radio Orchestra"	"Jonne Valtonen"	5:32
11.	"Rony Barrak-Solo"	"Rony Barrak"	"Jonne Valtonen"	3:05
12.	"Tunnel B1 (Suite)"	"WDR Radio Orchestra" "Rony Barrak"	"Jonne Valtonen"	3:05
13.	"Symphonic Shades"	"WDR Radio Orchestra"	"Jonne Valtonen"	3:05
14.	"Karawane der Elefanten"	"WDR Radio Orchestra" "FILMharmonic Choir Prague"	"Jonne Valtonen" ("Adam Klemens")	3:05
15.	"Turrican II – The Final Fight (Renderings: Main Theme)"	"WDR Radio Orchestra" "Jari Salmela"	"Jonne Valtonen"	3:05

All tracks composed by Chris Hülsbeck, Arranged and orchestrated by Jonne Valtonen.

== Reception ==
Much like the concert, the album was met with universal praise from the critical community and the fans. Chris Greening of Square Enix Music Online stated "Symphonic Shades - Hülsbeck in Concert is the best orchestral game music album ever created" and "Simply a perfect production all round." before awarding the album 10 out of 10 points. Tim Sheehy of Original Sound Version proclaimed Symphonic Shades "gives us a full CD of beautiful orchestrations which are arranged so well that you’ll enjoy them even if you’ve never played any of the games". German journalist Thomas Nickel gave high praise to the CD as well, stating "The album is not only a treat for hardcore fans,[...] it shows how far the medium of game music has gotten."
