= The Adventures of Quik & Silva =

1991 video game

- Developer: Kaiko (as New Bits on the RAM)
- Publisher: Amiga Fun (Note: Amiga Fun only published the Amiga version.)
- Composer: Chris Hülsbeck
- Platforms: Amiga, Atari ST
- Release: EU: 10 May 1991
- Genre: Platform
- Mode: Single-player

The Adventures of Quik & Silva is a platform video game originally released on 10 May 1991, in the United Kingdom for the Amiga and Atari ST. The game was developed by Kaiko, pseudonymously as "New Bits on the RAM" (a play on New Kids on the Block), and was first published as a covermount disk in issue 7 of the magazine Amiga Fun. The game was made available in 1992 as public-domain software, with the Amiga version reviewed in issue 18 of Amiga Power.

== Plot ==
On the small island kingdom of Funnyland, King Walter steps down from the throne, wanting to enjoy his life like the rest of the island's inhabitants. His ambitious daughter, Princess Leila, takes over the crown, and is tasked to paint the royal carriage pink and light blue. However, at Funnyland's toy factory (currently doing a trade in soft, cuddly toys from the ozone hole), some sloppy workers leave the microwave open, and a rhinoceros-fly takes a rest on the main switch. This causes the microwave to start up and change the toys into destructive monsters, putting Funnyland in danger. The inhabitants of Funnyland confront Leila about the issue. The princess remembers two robots that she invited to her last birthday party, Quik and Silva, and decides to call their service "QUIK & SILVA Computer Game Heroes Inc." and ask them for help. Thus, the two robots set out to save Funnyland from the evil monsters.

== Gameplay ==
Players take control of Quik and Silva and must guide them through the levels of the game without losing their lives, while avoiding the monsters that stand in their way. Power-ups come in the form of "P" symbols that give extra scatter power to the robots' plasma torpedoes. Bonus points and extra lives come in the form of "B" and "X" symbols, and are obtained by hitting and bouncing on the blocks and platforms scattered throughout the levels, but many of them are hard to come by. The game spans eight levels, following two alternating styles of overworld and underground.

== Development ==
The Adventures of Quik and Silva was programmed by Peter Thierolf, with graphics by Frank Matzke and music, sound effects and voices by Chris Hülsbeck. The game was made in less than two weeks to collect money and given its name due to Kaiko having financial problems with Apidya. Kaiko got 15000 Deutsche Marks for each version, Amiga and Atari ST, from the Amiga Fun magazine, allowing the company to complete the game and publish and ship it almost immediately. In the end it turned out good, but since Kaiko did not want to be directly associated with the game, they released the game as "New Bits on the RAM" and invented pseudonyms for the credited developers (except Hülsbeck). The pseudonyms were a homage to Andrew Braybrook (Andreas Breebruck), a coder and key person at Graftgold, and Mark Coleman (Markus Kohlmann), a graphics artist for the Bitmap Brothers. The logo for "New Bits on the RAM" was a ripoff of the Bitmap Brothers' logo, with the hand changed to one giving a thumbs-up.

The various enemies in the game are based on characters from other titles, such as Bubble Bobble, Nebulus, R-Type, and Super Mario. As the game was released as a cover-disk game, it was able to avoid possible copyright infringement for a few months. The game was not available outside of the UK during its cover-disk release and only started to gain traction when it had become public domain software. This game is also notable for being the first home video game to feature Sonic the Hedgehog, in an unofficial capacity, as an enemy.
