= Jason Michael Paul =

American concert producer

Jason Michael Paul is an American concert producer, promoter, and entrepreneur. His production company, "Jason Michael Paul Productions", produced “Dear Friends”, Play! A Video Game Symphony, and Nintendo's Legend of Zelda: Symphony of the Goddesses.
