= Daytona USA =

1994 video game

- North American arcade flyer with the deluxe cabinet pictured
- Developer: Sega AM2
- Publisher: Sega (Note: Released for Sega Saturn and Windows under the Sega Sports banner.)
- Director: Toshihiro Nagoshi
- Producers: Toshihiro Nagoshi; Yu Suzuki
- Designers: Makoto Osaki; Yukinobu Arikawa
- Programmers: Daichi Katagiri; Koki Koiwa; Hideomi Miyauchi
- Artist: Toshihiro Nagoshi
- Composer: Takenobu Mitsuyoshi
- Series: Daytona USA
- Platforms: Arcade, Sega Saturn, Windows, PlayStation 3, Xbox 360
- Release: March 1994: Arcade; JP/NA: March 1994; WW: April 1994 Saturn; JP: April 1, 1995; NA: May 11, 1995; EU: July 8, 1995 Windows; JP: September 27, 1996 (Enhanced Board version); EU: November 14, 1996; NA: November 6, 1996; JP: December 6, 1996 PlayStation 3; NA: October 25, 2011; JP: October 26, 2011; EU: November 23, 2011 Xbox 360; WW: October 26, 2011
- Genre: Racing
- Modes: Single-player, multiplayer
- Arcade system: Sega Model 2

Daytona USA (Note: Japanese: DAYTONA(デイトナ) USA, Hepburn: Deitona USA) is a 1994 racing game developed by Sega AM2 and published by Sega for arcades. Inspired by the popularity of the NASCAR motor racing series in the United States, it has players race stock cars on one of three courses. It was the first game released on the Sega Model 2 arcade system board.

Sega partnered with GE Aerospace to develop the Model 2, which renders 3D graphics capable of texture filtering and texture mapping. Daytona USA was developed by AM2 after a meeting of the heads of Sega's regional offices to decide on a game to debut the Model 2 hardware. The concept was suggested by Tom Petit, president of Sega's American arcade division, with input from AM2 director Toshihiro Nagoshi, who became the game's director and producer. Sega aimed to outperform Namco's Ridge Racer (1993). The developers researched motorsports extensively; they mapped Daytona International Speedway, and their experience developing Virtua Racing (1992) helped with lighting and camera control.

Daytona USA became one of the highest-grossing arcade games of all time, and was a critical and commercial success, with its graphics, soundtrack and gameplay receiving high praise. The game was ported to the Sega Saturn in 1995, and was followed by sequels and enhanced versions for consoles and arcades. It has been frequently named one of the best video games.

== Gameplay ==
The player driving through the beginner course (arcade version)

In Daytona USA, the player drives a stock car known as the Hornet. The player's objectives are to outrun the competing cars and complete the race before time runs out, passing checkpoints to collect more time. Players begin in last place and compete against a field of up to 39 computer-controlled cars, dependent on the course selected. Three courses are available for play: Beginner, Advanced, and Expert, also known respectively as Three Seven Speedway, Dinosaur Canyon, and Seaside Street Galaxy. Adaptive difficulty is used; the first lap of each race measures the skill of the player and adjusts the difficulty of opponents accordingly. For less skilled players, opposing cars open lanes for the player, while higher-skilled players have to deal with opponents that block their path. The game's physics include realistic driving mechanics, including drifting and power sliding. The steering wheel in the arcade cabinet uses force feedback so players feel collisions and bumps. Shifting is performed with an H-type shifter.

Daytona USA's arcade version on the Model 2 is capable of displaying up to 300,000 texture-mapped polygons per second, nearly double that of the previous Model 1. Visually, the game uses texture filtering, giving the visuals a smooth appearance. As in Virtua Racing, the game's camera system presents four different view perspectives from which the game can be played, and also includes the ability to view behind the car. The arcade version allows up to eight players to compete with each other, depending on the number of cabinets linked together. Linked deluxe cabinets may also include a camera pointing towards the drivers seat, linked to a closed-circuit television to show the player on a separate screen. In multiplayer, only the lead driver needs to reach a checkpoint before time runs out. Rubber-banding is used in multiplayer races to ensure all players stay involved in the race.

The Sega Saturn version does not include multiplayer, but includes an additional "Saturn" mode, which turns off the game's timer and adds more cars for the player to choose from. Additional "Endurance" and "Grand Prix" modes are also included, both of which require pit stops. Sustaining damage in a race in these modes will adversely affect the car's performance. The PlayStation 3 and Xbox 360 versions included online multiplayer with up to eight players.

== Development ==
In September 1992, Sega partnered with the engineering division GE Aerospace to create its new arcade system board, the Model 2. They were connected via a cold call from GE's Bob Hichborn, who met with Sega executives at the division's Daytona Beach, Florida headquarters in 1990, and later at Sega's headquarters in Tokyo in November of the same year. At the second meeting, GE Aerospace executives brought a tape demonstrating the hardware's 3D graphics simulating the Daytona International Speedway. GE estimated that their sale of the Model 2's graphics technology accelerated Sega's arcade hardware development by 14 months.

The heads of Sega's regional offices began discussing ideas for games to demonstrate the Model 2's capabilities. Sega's previous board, the Model 1, had debuted in 1992 with Virtua Racing, which was popular in Japan and Europe. Tom Petit, president of Sega's American arcade division Sega Enterprises USA, suggested that NASCAR would be an attractive brand to use for a Model 2 game in the US. Though Sega Europe's Vic Leslie had reservations due to the greater popularity of Formula One in Europe, Sega executives approved the concept. Petit and Sega Enterprises USA chief of finance Masahiro Nakagawa began negotiations with representatives of the Daytona 500 at Daytona International Speedway for a license to develop a game based on the race. To lower costs, Sega decided not to negotiate with NASCAR for a license, and so the game does not contain real sponsors, drivers, or cars.

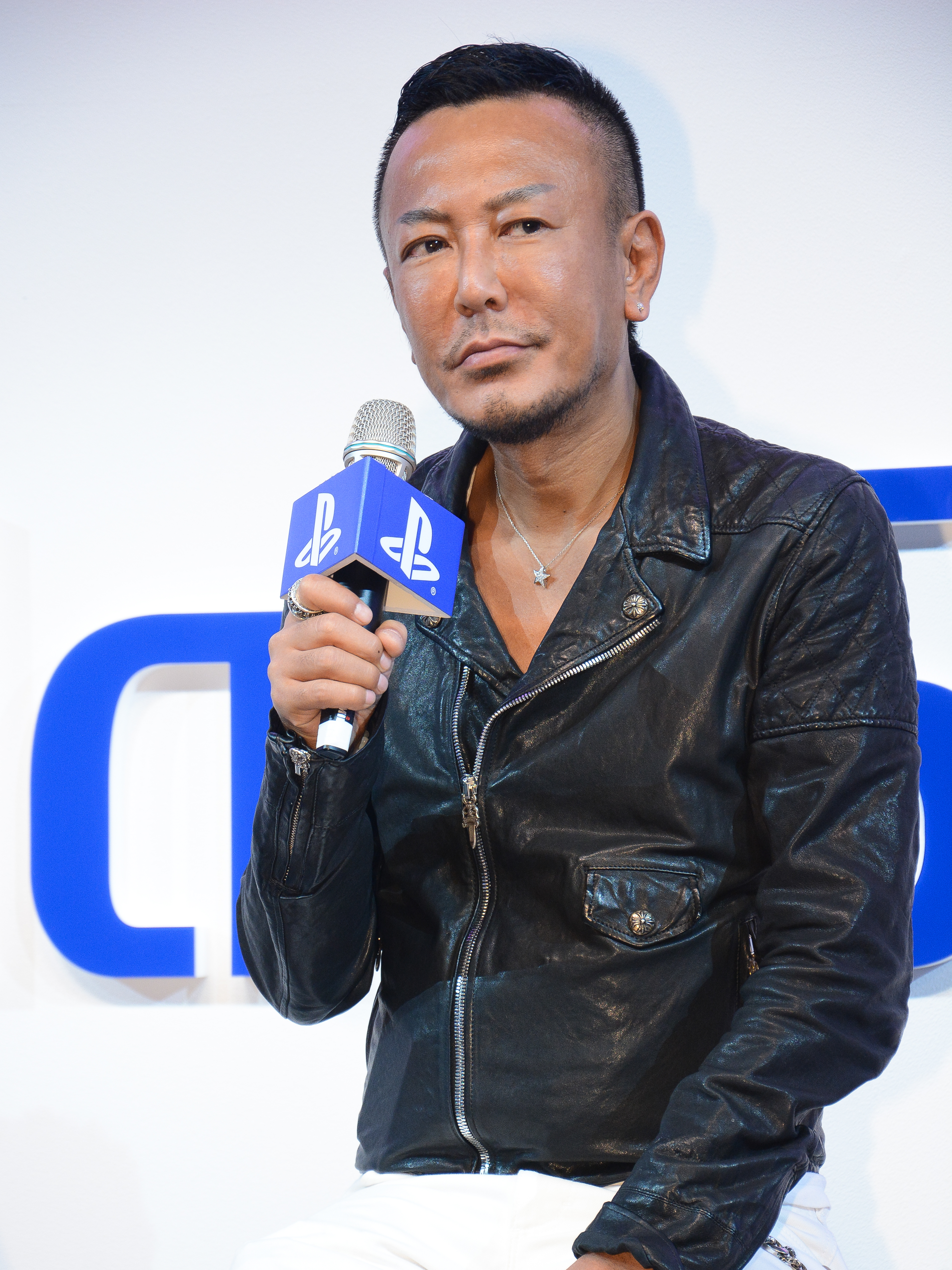
Director and co-producer Toshihiro Nagoshi

Sega mandated that Daytona USA had to be better than Namco's 1993 racing game Ridge Racer and it had to achieve higher sales. Ridge Racer had reached the top of arcade sales charts at the end of 1993 and beginning of 1994, and it had received highly favorable reviews of its graphics, especially in comparison to Virtua Racing. Development was assigned to Sega AM2, a development division headed by Yu Suzuki, who had led development on popular racing games including Hang-On, Out Run, and Virtua Racing. AM2 director Toshihiro Nagoshi was given direct responsibility for the project, with Nagoshi and Suzuki serving as producers. The game was Nagoshi's first project as a director. Nagoshi was aware of the racing arcade games already on the market and decided he wanted to take his game in a different direction. While in the US for a meeting on the Model 2, Nagoshi was given tickets to a NASCAR race, and later recalled that it was a new experience for him because it was not a known style of racing in Japan. He chose to design his game to be "funky entertainment", in contrast to the simulation-based style of Ridge Racer.

AM2 split into two teams: one focused on Daytona USA while the other developed Virtua Fighter. As research for the project, Nagoshi read books and watched videos on NASCAR, although he found it difficult to convey the emotions of the sport to his staff in Japan. Game planner Makoto Osaki said he purchased a sports car and watched the NASCAR film Days of Thunder more than 100 times. Programmer Daichi Katagiri was an avid player of arcade racing games at the time and leaned on that experience. The developers used satellite imagery and sent staff to photograph Daytona International Speedway; Nagoshi walked a full lap to get a feel for the banking in the corners. The team considered both Daytona International Speedway and Bristol Motor Speedway for the game's beginner course. According to Nagoshi, because Daytona USA was not intended to be a simulation game, and because it would be sold in Japan and Europe in addition to North America, the oval and tri-oval designs were rejected as too repetitive. The final design for the beginner circuit, Three Seven Speedway, uses the tri-oval layout with a sharper final turn that requires strong braking.

Unlike Virtua Racing's Model 1 hardware, the Model 2 is capable of displaying surface detail on its 3D graphics with texture mapping. As this was new for the developers, trial and error was used to find the most effective approach. Suzuki also reached out to Sega designer Jeffery Buchanan, who suggested placing interesting features, such as a dinosaur fossil and a clipper ship, at various locations within the game. Katagiri said there was no need to develop software for rendering because the Model 2 hardware handled this. For camera control and lighting effects, the team drew on its experience developing Virtua Racing. Daytona USA shares some features with Ridge Racer, including a drifting mechanic. Nagoshi initially planned not to include drifting as NASCAR stock cars do not drift, but changed his mind when the team decided not to focus on simulation. He did not believe in fortune telling, but chose the number 41 for the Hornet player car because he was told by someone close to him that the number would be lucky.

The soundtrack was composed by Takenobu Mitsuyoshi, who had no familiarity with stock car racing. He chose to include vocals after hearing Ridge Racer's techno soundtrack and deciding to try a different approach; he recorded his own vocals as the fastest way to get the music into the game. Each course has a corresponding song. "Let's Go Away", the Daytona theme, uses a mixture of rock and funk instrumentals, while "Sky High" leaned on Mitsuyoshi's background in jazz fusion. A hidden track, "Pounding Pavement", was inspired by "Hotel California" by the Eagles and is accessible by holding the fourth view perspective button while selecting the beginner track in the arcade version. For the arcade version, the songs were sampled onto a Yamaha sound chip, including the drums and Mitsuyoshi's voice, then reconstructed by varying when the tracks would play and loop. This was the only way to include vocals, due to technical limitations of the Model 2. For the Saturn version, the music was remixed.

== Release ==
Prior to release, Sega debuted a prototype of Daytona USA at the Amusement Machine Show in Tokyo in August 1993, and it was tested in select Japanese arcades the same month; Petit stated that this was done to measure how the games would be received by the public. The complete version of Daytona USA was released in Japan in March 1994, and made its North American debut the same month at Chicago's American Coin Machine Exposition (ACME); it was subsequently released worldwide in April 1994. According to Petit, Sega delayed the worldwide launch to measure reception before investing in other territories. The standard game was released in a twin-seat cabinet and a deluxe cabinet fitted with detailed seats on top of subwoofers; Sega originally planned to use actual car seats, but management determined the seats were too difficult to enter and exit. Daytona USA debuted at number two on arcade operator publication RePlay's "Player's Choice" chart and stayed on the list for five years, with 16 months at number one. Daytona USA was rereleased in 1996 in arcades as Daytona USA: Special Edition, designed as a smaller, more affordable cabinet.

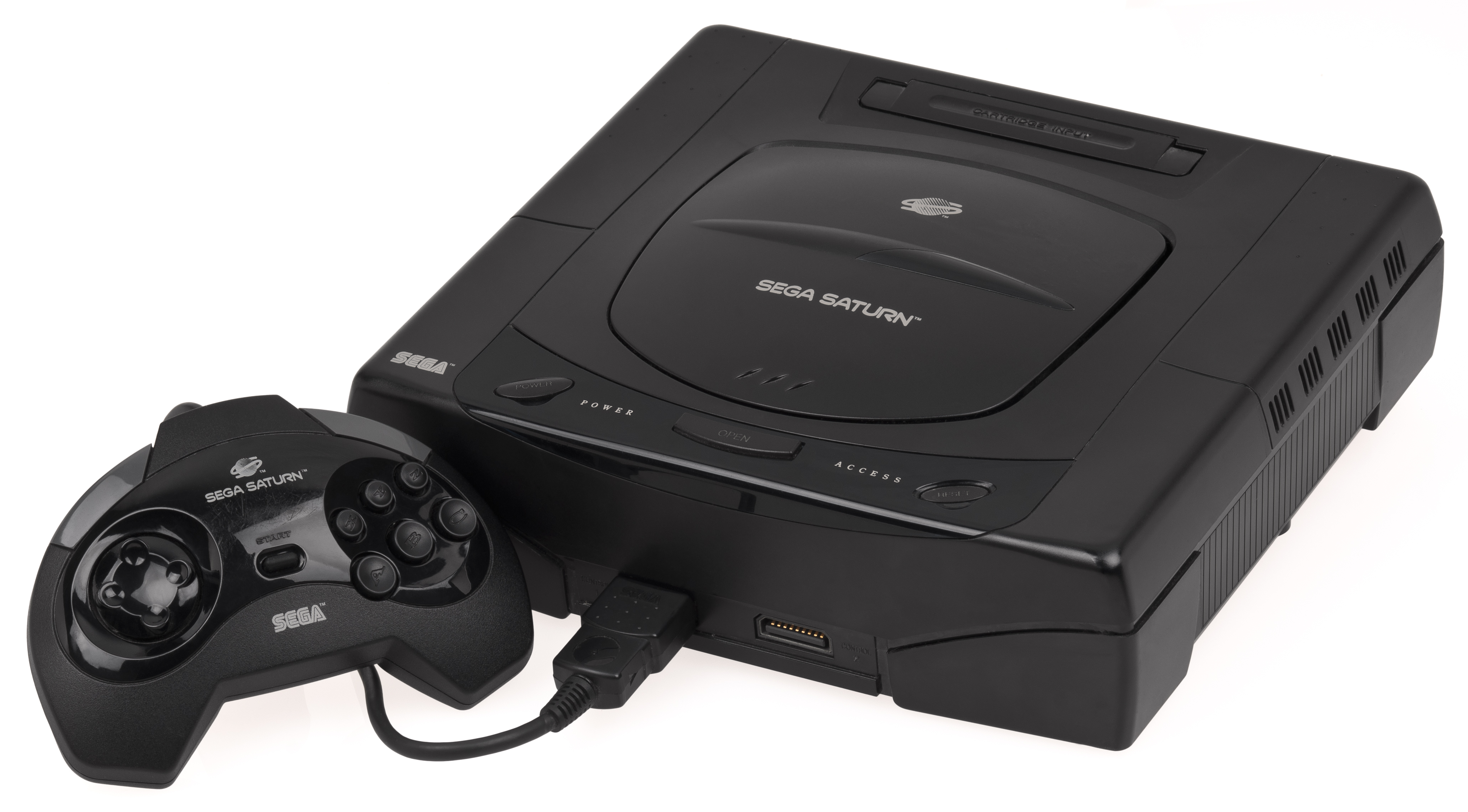
Daytona USA was a launch game for the Sega Saturn in North America and Europe.

Around the time of the worldwide release, Sega announced releases for its Saturn and 32X consoles, but a year later, Sega announced their intention to focus solely on the Saturn. In early 1995, Sega AM2's Saturn division split into three departments, each charged with converting a different arcade game to the Saturn: Virtua Fighter 2, Virtua Cop, and Daytona USA. Due to slow progress on the Daytona USA conversion, several members of the Virtua Fighter 2 team were reassigned to Daytona USA. AM2 completed the conversion in April 1995. It was a Western launch game for Saturn, and was also released for Windows via SegaSoft. In Japan, two separate Windows releases were done in September and December 1996, with the first released version supporting specific graphics cards such as Leadtek's WinFast GD400. A Windows version was released in Europe on November 14, 1996, and in North America in December of the same year.

== Remakes and sequels ==
Daytona USA: Championship Circuit Edition, a reworked and expanded version of Daytona USA, was released in 1996 for the Saturn. Developed by Sega's consumer software division, it uses a modified version of the game engine used for Sega Rally Championship. An enhanced arcade remake, called Sega Racing Classic, was released in 2010 and is the first title in the series not branded with the Daytona name as Sega no longer owned the rights at the time. It operates on Sega's RingWide arcade system board and features high definition graphics and an arranged instrumental soundtrack.

Another enhanced version was released digitally for the PlayStation 3 and Xbox 360 in October 2011, titled Daytona USA. It includes both the original arcade soundtrack and the arranged soundtrack from Sega Racing Classic with vocals by Mitsuyoshi, along with added features including eight player online multiplayer, challenge, and karaoke modes. The Xbox 360 version was later made backward compatible on the Xbox One in March 2017, which was extended to the Xbox Series X/S. The game was delisted from all Xbox stores in February 2023.

Daytona USA 2: Battle on the Edge, an arcade-exclusive sequel using the Sega Model 3 hardware, was released in 1998. It is the only Daytona game that uses no courses or music from the original. Daytona USA 2001, a remake of Daytona USA and Championship Circuit Edition, was released in 2001 for the Dreamcast, with graphical upgrades, online multiplayer, and new courses. Daytona Championship USA, also referred to as Daytona USA 3, debuted in late 2016 as an arcade exclusive; it was the first Daytona-branded arcade game in 18 years.

== Reception and legacy ==
Reception

Aggregate score
Aggregator	Score
Metacritic	77/100 (360); 71/100 (PS3)

Review scores
Publication	Score
Computer and Video Games	96% (ARC); 96% (SAT)
Edge	8/10 (SAT)
Electronic Gaming Monthly	15.5/20 (SAT)
Eurogamer	9/10 (360)
Famitsu	30/40 (SAT)
Game Informer	8.75/10 (SAT)
GameFan	264/300 (SAT)
GamePro	4.5/5 (SAT)
GamesMaster	84% (SAT)
GamesRadar+	4.5/5 (360); 4.5/5 (PS3)
Next Generation	4/5 (SAT)
PlayStation Official Magazine – UK	8/10 (PS3)
Official Xbox Magazine (UK)	9/10 (360)
Player One	95% (SAT)
Entertainment Weekly	A (ARC)
Games World	93% (ARC); 94% (SAT)
Gamest	39/50 (ARC)
Intelligent Gamer	B (PC)
Maximum	5/5 (SAT)
Mean Machines	96% (SAT)
PC Team	86% (PC)
Sega Magazin	90% (SAT)
Sega Pro	94% (SAT)
Sega Saturn Magazine	5/5 (SAT)

Awards
Publication	Award
VideoGames	Best Arcade Game (2nd)
AMOA Awards	Most Innovative New Technology (nomination)

=== Arcade ===
Daytona USA was popular in arcades. In Japan, it was the ninth highest-grossing arcade game of 1994, and the highest-grossing dedicated arcade game of 1995. In North America, it was listed by arcade industry magazine Play Meter as one of the top two highest-grossing arcade video games of 1994, with the twin cabinet receiving a Diamond Award from the American Amusement Machine Association (AAMA) that year; it again received a Diamond Award the following year for being one of America's top three best-selling arcade games of 1995. In the United Kingdom, it topped the dedicated arcade charts for six months in 1994, from May to October. Retro Gamer's Nick Thorpe said that though Daytona USA is considered anecdotally one of the most successful arcade games for its multiplayer and longevity, exact figures were difficult to find. In 2015, IGN's Luke Reilly said that the game is "perhaps the most recognisable arcade racing game of all time and the highest-grossing sit-down cabinet ever" and noted the continued presence of Daytona USA cabinets in arcades and bowling alleys.

The original arcade game was critically acclaimed by video game and arcade industry publications alike. Upon its North American debut at ACME 1994, it received a highly positive reception from Play Meter and RePlay, which both considered it the game of the show while praising the graphics and gameplay, but with Play Meter criticizing the expensive cabinet price. Rik Skews of Computer and Video Games considered Daytona USA the best arcade game he had played in years, and praised its "state-of-the-art" graphics, sound, and damage physics. Also highly regarding Daytona USA's graphics were Electronic Gaming Monthly (EGM), which asserted that "the stakes in the arcade wars have been raised again", and GamePro's Manny LaMancha, who argued that Daytona USA is a combination of Virtua Racing's action with Ridge Racer's realism. In contrast, Bob Strauss of Entertainment Weekly compared the game to watching a movie, and said, "Picture yourself watching a sci-fi movie, set in a futuristic arcade, that involves a dizzying car race. 'Wow!' you can imagine saying to yourself, 'How did they do those special effects?' You'll have the same reaction while enjoying Daytona USA".

=== Saturn ===
The Saturn port sold over 500,000 units in Japan, as well as more than 500,000 bundled copies in the USA by December 1996 for a total of 1 million units sold across both regions. It received a positive reception, with high scores from most critics, though a number of them criticized it for graphical issues. Maximum highly regarded the challenging course design and realistic game mechanics, particularly the impact of wind resistance, but criticized the low-resolution graphic texture mapping, clipping, and lack of multiplayer. While identifying improvements on the North American version of the game compared to the Japanese version, two sports game reviewers for EGM found problems with the frame rate and animation. By contrast, a reviewer for Sega Saturn Magazine found the game graphically impressive aside from the pop-up and asserted it had strong arcade-style gameplay, and one from Next Generation argued that, while "Daytona USA suffers from an accumulation of weaknesses, if it's a fast, thrilling racing game you're after, the Saturn conversion has a great deal to recommend". The Windows version was a port of the Saturn's, and was not as well-received for inheriting the Saturn version's graphical issues despite being released a year later.

Several reviewers compared the Saturn version to Ridge Racer's PlayStation conversion. Computer and Video Games considered the Saturn's Daytona USA better than the PlayStation's Ridge Racer, with Mark Patterson claiming that, while "nowhere near as polished as Ridge Racer, it does play better, mainly because you can ram the other cars off the track and smash your own car up". While Air Hendrix of GamePro concluded Daytona USA's "intense gameplay and breathtaking graphics will exhilarate any racing fan" and had positive feedback for the additions of Saturn mode and mirror mode, he argued it "pales in comparison" to the PlayStation version of Ridge Racer in terms of "features, gameplay, and graphics".

=== Retrospective ===
Daytona USA was named one of the best games of all time by Next Generation in 1996, GamesMaster in 1996, Computer and Video Games in 2000, EGM in 1997 and 2001, Yahoo! in 2005, and Empire in 2009. It was named one of the best coin-op games by EGM in 1997 and by Killer List of Videogames, and one of the best retro games by NowGamer in 2010 and EGM in 2006. Edge named it the 70th "best game to play today" in 2009. In 2015, IGN named it the sixth-most influential racing game, asserting that it "remains a shining example of arcade racing done oh so right". Thorpe wrote that Daytona USA "doesn't just stand alongside the likes of Turbo, Out Run, Super Monaco GP and Sega Rally as part of a proud arcade racing heritage, but perhaps defines it".

According to aggregator Metacritic, the Xbox 360 version received "generally favorable reviews" and the PlayStation 3 version received "mixed" reviews. Justin Towell of GamesRadar+ regarded Daytona USA as "a joyous, jubilant celebration of everything that made arcade games so exciting" and the new survival mode "a brilliant test of memory, logic and dexterity". 1Up.com's Ray Barnholt praised this version but expressed disappointment at the lack of new features. By contrast, Eurogamer's Martin Robinson asserted that "age doesn't seem to have ravaged Daytona USA's core" and wrote that the game serves as "fitting tribute to one of arcade racing's enduring icons".

== See also ==
- Indy 500
- NASCAR Arcade
