= Daytona USA: Championship Circuit Edition =

1996 video game

- European Saturn cover art
- Developer: Sega AM3
- Publisher: Sega (Note: Released under the Sega Sports banner.)
- Director: Ryuichi Hattori
- Producer: Noriyoshi Oba
- Artist: Shiro Kinemura
- Composers: Jun Senoue; Richard Jacques; Kenichi Tokoi; Tomonori Sawada
- Series: Daytona USA
- Platforms: Sega Saturn, Windows
- Release: Saturn: PAL: November 14, 1996; NA: November 21, 1996; JP: January 24, 1997; NA: February 16, 1998 (Netlink Edition); Windows: PAL: October 1997; NA: October 21, 1997
- Genre: Racing
- Modes: Single-player, multiplayer

Daytona USA: Championship Circuit Edition, titled Daytona USA: Circuit Edition in Japan, is a 1996 racing game developed by Sega AM3 and published by Sega for the Sega Saturn. It is a reworked and extended version of the 1994 arcade game Daytona USA, and runs on a modified version of the game engine used for the Saturn version of Sega Rally Championship.

Championship Circuit Edition was originally released in Europe and North America, with some modifications done in the subsequent Japanese release. Improvements over the original Saturn port of Daytona USA include a drastic reduction in popup, increased framerate (now a consistent 30 frames per second), a new selection of cars, two new courses, a 2-player mode, compatibility with the Saturn's 3D analogue control pad and Arcade Racer steering wheel, and a ghost mode. The European release does not feature the "black bars" at the top and bottom of the screen that are present in the majority of PAL games of the era - the box boasts "slick new full screen graphics".

A port for Microsoft Windows was released in October 1997. The game was also separately released in North America in 1998 for the Saturn as a Sega Net Link-compatible title, entitled Daytona USA: CCE Netlink Edition.

== Gameplay ==
Championship Circuit Edition is the first version of Daytona USA to name the three tracks present in the original game, rather than using Beginner, Advanced, and Expert. The tracks are "Three Seven Speedway" (beginner track), "Dinosaur Canyon" (advanced track) and "Seaside Street Galaxy" (expert track). The game also features two brand new circuits, "National Park Speedway" and "Desert City". Daytona USA Deluxe for PC also adds a sixth course, "Silver Ocean Causeway".

Team Hornet and their car do not appear in the game. Instead, there are a number of individual cars selectable, each named after their respective racing team.

== Development and release ==
After finishing the Saturn version of Sega Rally Championship, Sega AM3 were planning to do a Saturn conversion of Indy 500, but due to fan demand they undertook Daytona USA: Championship Circuit Edition instead. Work on the game began in March 1996.

In response to numerous fan complaints that the original Daytona USA soundtrack was inappropriate for a racing game, Sega Europe's in-house composer, Richard Jacques, was tasked with remixing the original songs, along with musicians from both Sega Japan and Sega America, including Jun Senoue. The Japanese version of the game includes music from the original port of Daytona USA, but this was not included in international releases.

The game retained the "Dancing Jeffry" feature from the Seaside Street Galaxy from the original Daytona USA. Jeffry is one of the main characters from Virtua Fighter; a statue of him was created in the course as a secondary feature.

Due to heavy consumer demand for the game in Europe, Daytona USA: Championship Circuit Edition was released there first, with North American and Japanese versions following some months later - a reverse of the usual pattern.

== Reception ==
Reception

Review scores
Publication	Score
Game Informer	8/10 (SAT)
GameSpot	6.8/10 (SAT)
Sega Saturn Magazine	90% (SAT)

Reviewing the Saturn version in GameSpot, Tom Ham called Championship Circuit Edition "a very impressive sequel that greatly improves upon the original." He particularly praised the two-player mode, high frame rate, near absence of pop up, and dramatic crash sequences. Rich Leadbetter of Sega Saturn Magazine was also impressed with the graphical features, but strongly objected to the fact that the cars do not handle the same as they did in the arcade and Saturn versions of Daytona USA. He found the music uneven and the two-player mode plagued by clipping on the three original tracks, and concluded, "Take away the Daytona baggage and essentially you have a different racing game that is very enjoyable to play, looks absolutely fantastic, has five ace tracks, two-player capabilities and loads of lastability. ... It's just a shame that the genius gameplay that made Saturn Daytona USA so great (despite its graphical frailties) isn't here in any way, shape or form." GamePro's Johnny Ballgame judged it "a solid sequel" and a strong racer in absolute terms, but concluded that Saturn owners should instead get Andretti Racing, since the Saturn version was being released in stores at the same time and has a much larger number of tracks.
