= Gem'X =

- Developer: Kaiko
- Publishers: Demonware; Global Software (Amiga)
- Designers: Torsten Lamparter; Peter Thierolf
- Artist: Frank Matzke
- Composer: Chris Huelsbeck
- Platforms: Amiga, Atari ST, Commodore 64
- Release: April 1991: Amiga, ST; June 1991: C64; 1992: Amiga (Global Software)
- Genre: Puzzle

Gem'X is a puzzle video game for the Amiga, Commodore 64, and Atari ST. It was developed by Kaiko and published by Demonware in 1991. The game uses Japanese-style graphics, with interludes of mildly erotic, anime-esque images of girls. Kaiko is sometimes mistaken as a Japanese developer, but is German and at the time was created as a publishing label for A.U.D.I.O.S (Art Under Design, Imaginations Of Sound) until it became the main name.

== Gameplay ==
The player is presented with two rectangular grids of coloured gems called fields. The field on the right contains a combination of coloured gems piled on top of each other. The left one contains a similar setup to the right, only this has several differences and may contain more gems. The aim is to click on gems on the left field to make them look identical to the right field within the given time limit.

To achieve the goal, the player can lower the colour value of a gem to enable it to match with its opposing gem in the right field. The order of colours is red, green, blue, pink and yellow. The player controls the cursor (a pointing hand) using the joystick. Pressing fire directly over a gem will lower the colour value two levels. For example, a green gem will turn pink and a blue gem will turn yellow. However, not only the selected gem will change colour. Those above, below, left and right of the selected gem will also be affected. These gems will lower their colour by one level, so a red gem would become green and a blue gem would turn pink. Following these simple rules gives the player the ability to match the two fields. A yellow gem has no colour with a lower valency. Therefore, if the player attempts to lower this gem it will automatically implode and the gem above will fall into the vacant hole. Clicking directly on a pink gem lowers the valency by two, so this also implodes as it moves below the value of yellow.

In each level, there is a limited number of moves and a limited amount of time available. If one of the two runs out, a life is lost and the level starts over again. The player always has the option to undo the last move made. Levels are played in groups, called mines. Each mine contains 16 levels, but only a few of them must be played, randomly chosen by the computer. The player can decide to skip the current level and move on to another, but at the cost of a life. Once the required number of levels is completed, the next mine can be chosen from two possibilities, following a tree diagram. A password is also obtained with which the game can be restarted directly from the new mine in the future. There are 26 mines in total for a total of about 400 levels.

The player is accompanied by a girl named Kiki, who provides encouragement throughout the game. At the end of each level, another of Kiki's friends is introduced, either wearing very skimpy clothing or completely nude, although their intimate parts are not shown. Only Kiki's intimate parts are shown in the final picture when completing the game.

== Development ==
Gem'X was the first game that Kaiko developed. Produced in 1990, the game was programmed by Torsten Lamparter, with graphics by Frank Matzke and Peter Thierolf as the project manager. Despite being developed in Germany, the game was designed to look like a Japanese game, complete with anime-style graphics inspired by Matzke's interest in manga culture, (garbled) Japanese text, and Kaiko's name chosen deliberately in order to sound Japanese. The music was written and composed by Chris Hülsbeck. Kiki's voice in the Amiga version was provided by Stephanie Padilla-Kaltenborn.

A sequel for the Amiga and MS-DOS, Gem'Z, also known as Super Gem'Z, was developed in 1992. The MS-DOS version was programmed by Marc Kamradt and Matthias Wiederwach. Kaiko took the only master copy of the new game to show off at the 1992 Cologne Computer Fair, where it was stolen. Within a few days, it was distributed as a pre-release crack. Kaiko was unable to recompile the game from the backups, so they turned to publisher Software 2000 for help. Software 2000 refused to publish the game, and thus it was never officially released. The sequel's gameplay mechanics were similar to those of Sokoban and Bomberman, with the addition of a multiplayer mode. The game would be remade as Inspector Gadget: Gadget's Crazy Maze and released by Ubisoft in 2001. On 11 November 2014, Leona's Tricky Adventure was released by KTX Software and Signo y Arte for Windows through Steam and the Dreamcast. The game has puzzle game elements inspired by Gem'X and newly arranged music by Hülsbeck, Fabian Del Priore, Marcus Lind and Carmen Konrad (including brand new tracks).

On 11 November 2014, Hülsbeck released Gem'X Extended Soundtrack on Bandcamp through his label Chris Hülsbeck Productions. The album contains the original soundtrack from Gem'X and Super Gem'Z and some remixes, as well as the soundtrack from Leona's Tricky Adventure, composed by Hülsbeck and Del Priore.

== Reception ==
Reception

Review scores
Publication	Score
Amiga Action	75%
Amiga Power	88%
Computer and Video Games	75%
ST Format	64%
Zzap!64	85%

Gem'X received generally positive reception from video game critics, due to its Japanese anime-style girl characters. UK magazines Amiga Power, Amiga Action, Computer and Video Games, ST Format and Zzap!64 scored the game an 88%, 75%, 64%, and 85%, respectively.
