= Daytona USA 2 =

1998 video game

Daytona USA 2: Battle on the Edge Sega Racing Classic 2 (2023 release)
- Japanese arcade flyer
- Developer: Sega AM2
- Publisher: Sega
- Director: Makoto Osaki
- Producer: Toshihiro Nagoshi
- Designer: Naotake Nishimura
- Composers: Fumio Ito; Takenobu Mitsuyoshi; Dennis St. James
- Series: Daytona USA
- Platform: Arcade
- Release: JP: June 1998; NA/EU: October 1998; JP/NA: December 1998 (Power Edition) November 2023 (Sega Racing Classic 2
- Genre: Racing
- Modes: Single-player, multiplayer
- Arcade system: Sega Model 3

Daytona USA 2: Battle on the Edge (known simply as Daytona USA 2 (Note: Japanese: DAYTONA(デイトナ) USA2, Hepburn: Deitona USA 2) in Japan, and Sega Racing Classic 2 in a 2023 release because of a licensing issue) is an arcade racing game released by Sega in 1998 as a follow-up to the extremely successful Daytona USA.

== Gameplay ==
A notable change from the first game is the ability to select a car and corresponding driver, each with varying capabilities. The game also includes the "slingshot" technique known from NASCAR and real-world driving, whereby a car closely following behind another car (known as drafting) gains a boost in speed from the reduced aerodynamic drag on the front of the car.

The game has three courses: Forest Dome, a beginner course with 8 laps with a distance of 1 mile (1.6 km); Joypolis Amusement Park, an advanced course with 4 laps with a distance of 2.5 miles (4.0 km); and Virtua City, an expert course with 2 laps with a distance of 5 miles (8.0 km). As in Daytona USA (1994), mirrored versions of the tracks can be played if the player holds down the Start button when selecting the course. Finishing a race in the top 3 in any course allows the player to view an "ending" and see the game credits.

Several modes are available. As in Daytona USA (1994), the 'time lap' mode can be accessed by holding down start at the transmission select screen. An arcade operator can use the service menu to activate Grand Prix or Endurance which increases the number of laps in a game.

== Release history ==
Daytona USA 2 was released in arcades in 1998. The majority of the arcade cabinets were released as deluxe models (with far fewer Twin Cabinets), which could be linked together for up to sixteen players.

The game was not released on home video game consoles until 2023 when Sega included the "Power Edition" version (see below) within the in-game videogame arcade inside Like a Dragon Gaiden: The Man Who Erased His Name. In 2025, the original edition of Daytona USA 2 was included within the in-game arcade of Like a Dragon: Pirate Yakuza in Hawaii. Sega re-titled the in-game game as Sega Racing Classic 2 because they no longer held a NASCAR trademark license.

== Power Edition ==
In late 1998, Sega released an updated version named Daytona USA 2: Power Edition with several changes to art and programming.

Course changes include the environment of the beginner course; the dome and natural scenery that encircle the track in the regular release are removed, resulting in a traditional "NASCAR Oval" look, though the course layout remains the same. A change is made to one corner in the Advanced course to balance out the difficulty. Before this change, many players considered this particular corner the most difficult in the game.

Handling physics were slightly revamped. The opponent cars' AI has been made more aggressive. A new "Challenge" course option combines the three courses together. The sponsorship on the beginner car's livery is changed.

Unusual for an arcade game, there was also an official strategy guide released in Japan. This strategy guide featured developer interviews as well as comprehensive tips and hints compiled by a group of arcade driving game professionals known as Team Marubaku. The strategy guide has been out of print for a number of years and second-hand copies can command high prices.

== Soundtrack ==
The Daytona USA 2 soundtrack was composed by Fumio Ito and Takenobu Mitsuyoshi, the latter being the composer of and singer on Daytona USA. Compared to the original game's soundtrack, the Daytona USA 2 soundtrack is heavier and more electric. Dennis St. James was the vocalist for all tracks with lyrics, four total. The game also has an alternate soundtrack with vocals provided by Mitsuyoshi, which can be enabled by the arcade operator. Contrary to popular belief, the band Winger did not create an entirely new soundtrack for the game or perform it as a band. Instead, the guitarist and drummer for Winger, Reb Beach and Rod Morgenstein, lent their skills to contribute to the soundtrack.

Daytona USA 2's soundtrack was released in Japan on dual-disc album on July 17, 1998. The first disc contains 'original audio' tracks – that is, the course themes etc. in standard format – and 'original sound' tracks – where Tom West, commentator for the Sega Sports Channel, reports on the day's racing. These tracks are the previous course themes mixed in parts with in-game audio, such as engine noise, crashes, radio chatter from the pit crew, and so on.

== Reception ==
In Japan, Game Machine listed Daytona USA 2 on their August 1, 1998 issue as being the third most-successful dedicated arcade game of the month. Next Generation reviewed the arcade version of the game, rating it four stars out of five, and stated that "we're happy to report that it comes completed with impressive graphics, improvements, new tracks, a level of detail that brings new sophistication to the game, and up to sixteen-player heats".

== See also ==
- NASCAR Arcade
- Sega Rally 2
- Scud Race
