= Symphonic Game Music Concerts =

Series of video game music concerts

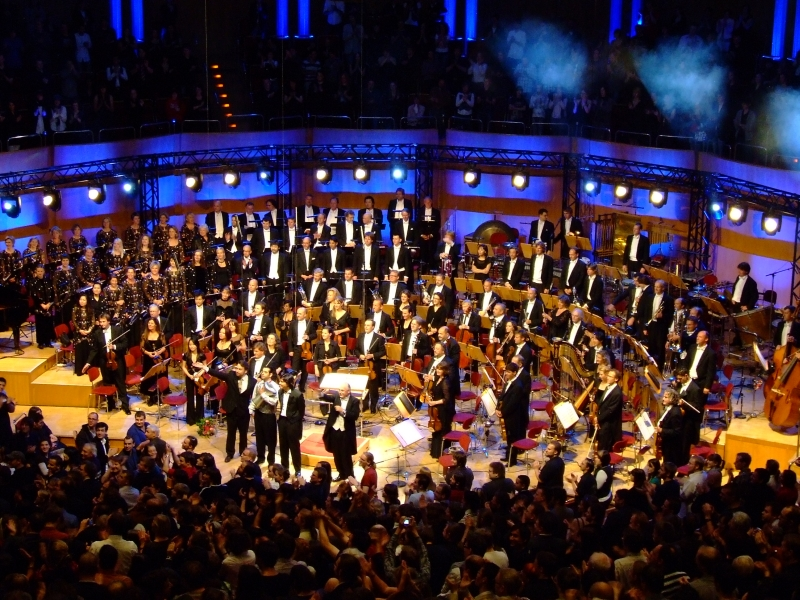
The participants of Symphonic Fantasies after the performance of the concert in 2009

The Symphonic Game Music Concerts (shortened to: Game Concerts) are a series of award-winning orchestral video game music concerts first performed in 2003 at the Gewandhaus in Leipzig, Germany, notable for being the longest running and the first of their kind outside Japan. They are produced by Thomas Böcker and performed by various orchestras conducted by Andy Brick (2003–2007), Arnie Roth (2008, 2009 and 2011), Niklas Willén (2010, 2012) and Eckehard Stier (from 2012).

In Leipzig, the Game Concerts series was held as GC in Concert from 2003 to 2007 as the official, annual opening ceremony of the GC – Games Convention. From 2008 to 2012, a cooperation with the WDR and its in-house orchestra, the WDR Funkhausorchester Köln, was established, with concerts primarily held at the Kölner Philharmonie. Since 2013, the events have been presented internationally, including performances with the London Symphony Orchestra at the Barbican Centre in London.

== Concerts in Leipzig (2003–2007) ==
=== Development ===
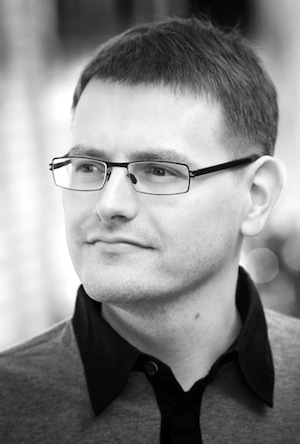
Producer Thomas Böcker

Inspired by Far Eastern concerts with music from video games, in particular the Orchestral Game Music Concerts from the nineties, Thomas Böcker developed the concept for the first event of its kind outside Japan. Wanting to reach as many people in the demographic as possible, he planned the concert alongside an established industry event. In 2002, he submitted his idea to the Leipzig Trade Fair, and they agreed to present a video game music concert during the GC – Games Convention, the first video game fair in Europe. The Leipzig Trade Fair promoted GC in Concert, while Böcker acted as creative director and producer. This involved creating a concert programme and obtaining the permission of individual publishers to perform music from their game releases.

=== GC in Concert ===
The GC in Concert logo used in 2007

On 20 August 2003, the first GC in Concert took place as part of the official opening ceremony of the GC – Games Convention, performed by the Czech National Symphony Orchestra. Four annual concerts with different programmes followed until 2007, from then on featuring the FILMharmonic Orchestra Prague. Böcker decided not to limit the selection of compositions for the GC in Concert series to European games and instead chose Asian, American and European titles, resulting in a variety of musical styles. The focus of the first concert was on music from publishers that had been recorded previously with live orchestras, which reduced the development phase to four months, starting in mid-April 2003.

After evaluating feedback from the audience, more music from classic games eventually found its way into the programmes. The following concerts had Böcker busy with the planning for one year each and increasingly included newly written and more experimental arrangements that were not merely orchestral versions of the original compositions, but personal interpretations by the arrangers. The pioneering work done by Böcker and his team paved the way for many comparable events.

All five concerts in Leipzig took place in front of sold-out audiences of around 2000 people each. In their role as official opening ceremonies of the GC – Games Convention, they also included various speeches by industry representatives and politicians such as Wolfgang Tiefensee. In addition, numerous composers took part, including Nobuo Uematsu, Yuzo Koshiro, Chris Hülsbeck, Rob Hubbard and Allister Brimble.

== Concerts in Cologne (2008–2012) ==
Following an invitation by Thomas Böcker, Winfried Fechner, the manager of the WDR Funkhausorchester Köln, attended the fifth GC in Concert in Leipzig in the hope of introducing a new genre of music to his own ensemble. Impressed by the response of the audience there, he saw an opportunity to inspire young people with orchestral music and entered into a collaboration with Böcker's Merregnon Studios, which soon led to the CD release drammatica -The Very Best of Yoko Shimomura-, the first in-house concert including video game music titled PROMS That's Sound, that's Rhythm and, a little later, Symphonic Shades – Hülsbeck in Concert.

=== Symphonic Shades – Hülsbeck in Concert ===
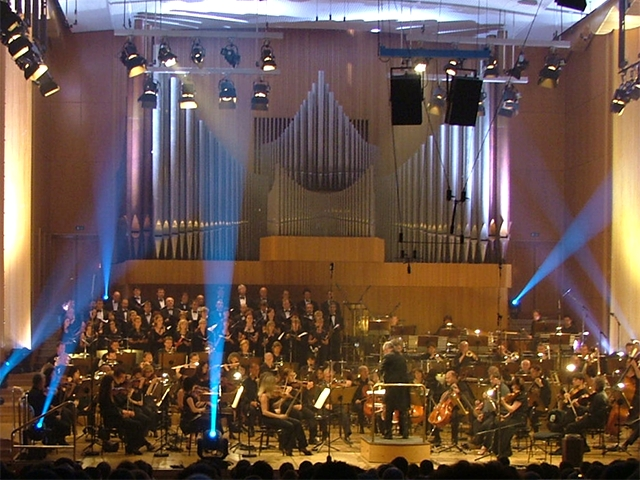
The WDR Funkhausorchester Köln and the FILMharmonic Choir Prague performing Symphonic Shades in 2008

In late 2007, Thomas Böcker announced his role as producer of Symphonic Shades, two concerts held on 23 August 2008 dedicated to the music of German composer Chris Hülsbeck. The premiere performance with the WDR Funkhausorchester Köln at the Funkhaus Wallrafplatz was the first game music concert to be broadcast live on the radio, WDR4.

On 4 August 2009, pieces from Symphonic Shades were performed by the Royal Stockholm Philharmonic Orchestra. They were part of the concert Sinfonia Drammatica at the Stockholm Concert Hall, which additionally featured tracks from drammatica -The Very Best of Yoko Shimomura. The Duisburg Philharmonic Orchestra's 3rd Family Concert also featured arrangements from Symphonic Shades.

=== Symphonic Fantasies – music from Square Enix ===
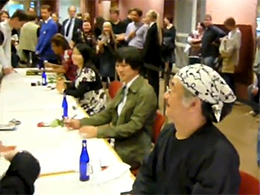
Uematsu, Mitsuda, Shimomura and Kikuta at an autograph session before Symphonic Fantasies in 2009

Symphonic Fantasies – music from Square Enix took place on 12 September 2009 at the Kölner Philharmonie. Tickets for the event quickly sold out, necessitating a second concert on 11 September 2009 at the Rudolf Weber-Arena in Oberhausen. The concert at the Philharmonie was broadcast on WDR4 and for the first time available via video streaming on the Internet. This was to be the case for all Game Concerts until 2011.

Symphonic Fantasies is dedicated to Japanese game developer Square Enix and includes arrangements of pieces from Final Fantasy, Secret of Mana, Chrono Trigger, Chrono Cross and Kingdom Hearts.

In 2012, five more concerts were performed in Tokyo, Stockholm and again in Cologne, with an additional performance in 2016 at the Barbican Centre in London with the London Symphony Orchestra. Albums have been released of concert recordings from both Cologne (via Decca Records) and Tokyo (via X5Music/Merregnon Records).

=== Symphonic Legends – Music from Nintendo ===
After the positive feedback from attendees of Symphonic Fantasies, the WDR announced another game concert titled Symphonic Legends, which took place at the Kölner Philharmonie on 23 September 2010. The event featured music from Japanese game developer Nintendo, with titles such as Super Mario Bros., Donkey Kong and Donkey Kong Country, Metroid, F-Zero and The Legend of Zelda being performed. The symphonic poem of The Legend of Zelda made up the entire second half of Symphonic Legends.

The LEGENDS performance on 1 June 2011, presented by the Royal Stockholm Philharmonic Orchestra, was partly based on arrangements from Symphonic Legends. On 13 July 2014, the London Symphony Orchestra performed the symphonic poem for The Legend of Zelda from this programme.

=== Symphonic Odysseys – Tribute to Nobuo Uematsu ===
With the reveal of Symphonic Legends, Winfried Fechner opened up in an interview that audiences could expect two game music concerts a year and announced Symphonic Odysseys – Tribute to Nobuo Uematsu, a homage to the Japanese composer Nobuo Uematsu. The programme, featuring arrangements from titles such as Lost Odyssey, Final Fantasy Legend, Blue Dragon and the Final Fantasy series, was performed twice at the Kölner Philharmonie on 9 July 2011.

Symphonic Odysseys was also performed by the London Symphony Orchestra in June 2017, on 18 June at the Philharmonie de Paris and on 20 June at the Barbican Centre. A recording of the concerts in Cologne was released as a double album on 28 December 2011 by Dog Ear Records, Uematsu's own label.

== Concerts worldwide (from 2013) ==
The official logo of the series adopted in 2016

=== Final Symphony – Music from Final Fantasy VI, VII and X ===
In May 2012, Thomas Böcker announced his tenth concert production titled Final Symphony, comprising music from Final Fantasy VI, VII and X, composed by Nobuo Uematsu and Masashi Hamauzu. The world premiere took place on 11 May 2013 and was performed by the Sinfonieorchester Wuppertal at the Stadthalle Wuppertal. Another performance took place on 30 May 2013 with the London Symphony Orchestra, the first concert of game music for the orchestra. The Final Symphony programme then went on a world tour with performances in Japan, Denmark, Sweden, Finland, the Netherlands, the USA, New Zealand, China, Austria, Australia and Poland.

A studio recording of Final Symphony was released on 23 February 2015 (via X5Music/Merregnon Records), performed by the London Symphony Orchestra at Abbey Road Studios.

=== Final Symphony II – Music from Final Fantasy V, VIII, IX and XIII ===
Plans for Final Symphony II were announced in March 2015. The world premiere with music from Final Fantasy V, VIII, IX, and XIII took place on 29 August 2015 at the Beethovenhalle in Bonn, performed by the Beethoven Orchester Bonn, followed by four performances in September and October 2015 by the London Symphony Orchestra in London, Osaka and twice in Yokohama. These performances marked the first time that a foreign orchestra gave concerts of game music in Japan. In addition to the events in Germany, the UK and Japan, Final Symphony II was also presented in Finland, Sweden and the Netherlands.

A studio recording of Final Symphony II was released on 4 August 2023 (via Merregnon Records), performed by the Royal Stockholm Philharmonic Orchestra at Konserthuset Stockholm.

=== Symphonic Memories – music from Square Enix ===
Symphonic Memories – Music from Square Enix was premiered by the Royal Stockholm Philharmonic Orchestra at the Stockholm Concert Hall on 9 June 2018. The concept of the production is to present popular scores from previous programmes such as Symphonic Fantasies, Final Symphony and Final Symphony II, and to combine some of them with new arrangements. In addition to music from Final Fantasy VI, VIII and the Chronos series, a suite of music from Final Fantasy XV was heard for the first time in Stockholm. Further events took place in Finland, Switzerland, Japan and Germany.

The concerts in Japan were recorded and published as a double album by Square Enix's music label. In addition to arrangements from Final Fantasy VIII and Final Fantasy XV, the world premieres of Octopath Traveler and Xenogears are part of the release.

=== Skyrim 10th Anniversary Concert ===
In 2021, for the tenth anniversary of Bethesda Softworks' action role-playing game Skyrim, Thomas Böcker produced a concert film featuring the London Symphony Orchestra and the London Voices at Alexandra Palace in London.

The video was released on YouTube on 11 November 2021, shortly followed by a music album.

=== Starfield – A Night with the London Symphony Orchestra ===
In September 2023, Thomas Böcker produced another concert film, again for Bethesda Softworks, for the action role-playing game Starfield, which had just been released at the time. The recording took place with the London Symphony Orchestra at LSO St Luke's. The video was published on YouTube on 13 September 2023.

=== Piano Fantasies ===
In October 2025, Merregnon premiered a new concert series, Piano Fantasies. A solo piano concert by Mischa Cheung, it features 12 arrangements of music from the Final Fantasy series, the Mana series, the Kingdom Hearts series, and Chrono Trigger. The initial concert was in Tokyo, with following concerts in London and Stockholm in January 2026. An album was released digitally on October 31, 2025, with a vinyl release following on November 21.

== Chamber music and school concerts ==
The Chamber Music Game Concerts performed by a string ensemble as well as the school concerts Heroes of Our Imagination and Super Mario Galaxy – A Musical Adventure were three sub-series of events also produced by Böcker.

A Chamber Music Game Concert in 2005 was held in conjunction with the gaming tournament GC-Cup at Augustusplatz in Leipzig, while two more of these performances were given in the context of a GC – Games Convention press conference and the exhibition Nintendo – Vom Kartenspiel zum Game Boy at the Landesmuseum Koblenz.

The four school concerts Heroes of our Imagination by the Elbland Philharmonie Sachsen in 2006 were conceived to demonstrate the differences and similarities between classical music and game music and to make orchestral concerts more accessible to a younger audience. Five more school concerts took place in January 2010. The Super Mario Galaxy – A Musical Adventure series was the spiritual successor to Heroes of Our Imagination. The concerts were officially licensed and sponsored by Nintendo. The music was accompanied with short narrations of the Super Mario Galaxy story.

== Awards ==
- 2020 Best Album – Official Arranged Album: Symphonic Memories Concert – music from Square Enix, Annual Game Music Awards 2020
- 2015 Best Album – Arranged Album: Final Symphony – music from Final Fantasy, Annual Game Music Awards 2015
- 2013 Outstanding Production – Concert: Final Symphony London – music from Final Fantasy, Annual Game Music Awards 2013
- 2012 Outstanding Production – Concert: Symphonic Fantasies Tokyo – music from Square Enix, Annual Game Music Awards 2012
- 2011 Outstanding Production – Concert: Symphonic Odysseys – Tribute to Nobuo Uematsu, Annual Game Music Awards 2011
- 2011 Best Live Concert: Symphonic Odysseys – Tribute to Nobuo Uematsu, Annual Original Sound Version Awards 2011
- 2011 Best Live Concert: Symphonic Legends – music from Nintendo, Annual Original Sound Version Awards 2010
- 2010 Best Arranged Album – Solo / Ensemble: Symphonic Fantasies – music from Square Enix, Annual Game Music Awards 2010
- 2010 Best Concert: Symphonic Legends – music from Nintendo, Swedish LEVEL magazine
