= Jonne Valtonen =

Finnish composer

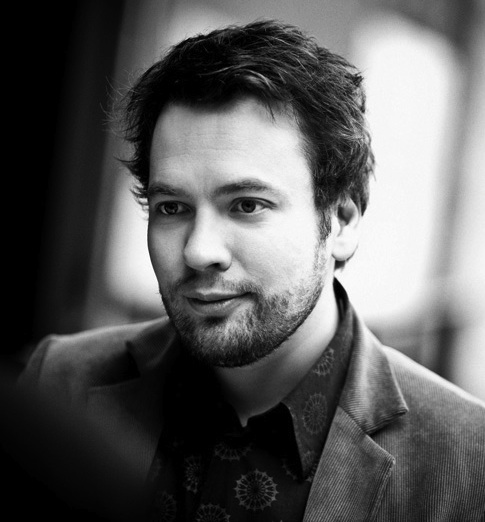

Background information
- Also known as: Purple Motion
- Born: Turku, Finland
- Genres: Orchestral, new age, electronic
- Occupations: Composer, arranger, orchestrator, musician
- Instruments: Piano; Keyboard; Harp
- Years active: 1991–present
- Formerly of: Future Crew
- Website: www.valtone.com

Jonne Valtonen is a Finnish composer, arranger and orchestrator. He contributed to demoscene and tracker music, under the name Purple Motion, and with Future Crew.

== Life and early career ==
"UnreaL ][ / PM"
Music from the demo Second Reality, composed under his Purple Motion alias.

Jonne Valtonen was born in Turku, Finland and was raised in Kaarina along with his brother. He began learning to play classical piano at the age of nine.

Valtonen's first music compositions were done on his home computer, a Commodore 64. During his teen years, he became involved in the PC demoscene where he was able to pursue his passion for electronic music production. He has won several awards in this field. Between 1991 and 1996 Valtonen created music for Future Crew, one of the groups in the demoscene at the time. Eventually he became their lead composer under the pseudonym Purple Motion, chosen as a tribute to the British rock group Deep Purple. His compositions include UnreaL ][ / PM (from Future Crew demo Second Reality), Satellite One, and Starshine.

Valtonen sings in a mixed choir (Näsin Ääni, Tampere) and has started learning to play the harp.

== Educational background ==
Jonne Valtonen graduated from classical composition at the Pirkanmaa Polytechnic in Finland in 2009. He has received training in composition under the guidance of Hannu Pohjannoro, Oliver Kohlenberg, and Juhani Nuorvala. He has also studied under Magnus Lindberg, Jukka Tiensuu, Kirmo Lintinen and Michael Nyman in various composition masterclasses.

== Working for the entertainment industry ==
In 1996, Jonne Valtonen began doing commission work for game developers in Finland, namely Remedy Entertainment, Housemarque and Bugbear Entertainment. During the same time, he served as the musical director for the TeatteriSusi theatre, where he composed music for several plays including Dracula, The Miser and Don Quijote.

In 1998, Jonne Valtonen co-founded his company Valtone Oy, specialising in music productions for the entertainment industry. Continuing on this path, he also contributed two titles, in 2000 and 2002, for the Merregnon trilogy, an international soundtrack project featuring orchestral music by veteran video game composers from all over the world, such as Chris Hülsbeck and Yuzo Koshiro. In 2002, Valtonen's talent was recognized again when he was presented with the Best Soundtrack Award at the International Fest of Cinema & Technology for the movie House by the Sea, directed by Janne Ketola. In 2004, Jonne Valtonen released his first professionally mastered audio CD, Musicdisk, featuring tracks from his demoscene past.

At the beginning of 2008, Jonne Valtonen took the position of the music lead for all live orchestra projects at Merregnon Studios, a company managed by Thomas Böcker and involved in productions of video game music concerts around the world, and several live recordings for publishers/developers such as THQ US, SEGA Japan and Square Enix Japan.

== Orchestra arrangements ==
Drawing on his background in live orchestra work and his studies, Jonne Valtonen has been arranging and orchestrating music for video game concerts since 2005. He has earned worldwide recognition as the main arranger of the annual video game music concerts of the German WDR Radio Orchestra, namely Symphonic Shades (2008), Symphonic Fantasies (2009), Symphonic Legends (2010), and Symphonic Odysseys (2011).

In addition to the WDR Radio Orchestra, his arrangements have been performed at the Sydney Opera House, Gewandhaus Leipzig, Max Fisher Music Center Detroit, Esplanade Singapore, Cologne Philharmonic Hall, and Konserthuset Stockholm. His portfolio includes franchises such as Final Fantasy, Super Mario Bros., Super Mario Galaxy, The Elder Scrolls, Metal Gear Solid, Kingdom Hearts, The Legend of Zelda, and Castlevania. In 2007, he arranged and orchestrated music for Sega's arcade game series World Club Champion Football which was recorded with a live orchestra and choir in Prague.

== Game music arrangements ==
- 2005 Elder Scrolls III: Morrowind (Suite) for the Symphonic Game Music Concert
- 2006 Super Mario Bros. (Suite) for PLAY! A Video Game Symphony
- 2006 The Legend of Zelda (Suite) for PLAY! A Video Game Symphony
- 2006 Turrican 3 (Suite) for the Symphonic Game Music Concert
- 2006 Castlevania: Symphony of the Night (Wood Carving Partita) for the Symphonic Game Music Concert
- 2007 Commodore 64 (Suite) for PLAY! A Video Game Symphony
- 2007 Amiga (Suite) for PLAY! A Video Game Symphony
- 2007 Secret of Mana (Suite) for the Symphonic Game Music Concert
- 2007 Metal Gear Solid 3: Snake Eater (Suite) for the Symphonic Game Music Concert
- 2007 World Club Champion Football 2006–2007 (live orchestra soundtrack) for SEGA
- 2007 World Club Champion Football 2006–2007 (Suite) for the Symphonic Game Music Concert
- 2007 Wonderland Adventures for Midnight Synergy
- 2008 Grand Monster Slam (Opening Fanfare) for the WDR concert That's Sound, that's Rhythm
- 2008 Mobile Suit Gundam Battlefield Record UC0081 (video game music arrangements) for Namco Bandai Games
- 2008 Symphonic Shades – Hülsbeck in concert (WDR concert dedicated to Chris Hülsbeck)
- 2009 Super Mario Galaxy – A Musical Adventure (school concert tour featuring music from Super Mario Galaxy)
- 2009 Symphonic Fantasies – music from Square Enix (WDR concert dedicated to the music of Square Enix)
- 2010 Symphonic Legends – music from Nintendo (WDR concert dedicated to the music of Nintendo)
- 2011 LEGENDS – music from Nintendo (concert of the Royal Stockholm Philharmonic Orchestra dedicated to the music of Nintendo)
- 2011 Symphonic Odysseys – Tribute to Nobuo Uematsu (WDR concert dedicated to Nobuo Uematsu)
- 2012 Symphonic Fantasies Tokyo – music from Square Enix (concert performed by the Tokyo Philharmonic Orchestra)
- 2012 Symphonic Fantasies Stockholm – music from Square Enix (concert performed by the Royal Stockholm Philharmonic Orchestra)
- 2013 Final Symphony – music from Final Fantasy VI, VII and X (concert performed by the Sinfonieorchester Wuppertal)
- 2013 Final Symphony London – music from Final Fantasy VI, VII and X (concert performed by the London Symphony Orchestra)
- 2014 Final Symphony Tokyo – music from Final Fantasy VI, VII and X (concert performed by the Tokyo Philharmonic Orchestra)
- 2014 Final Symphony Aarhus – music from Final Fantasy VI, VII and X (concert performed by the Aarhus Symphony Orchestra)
- 2014 Final Symphony Stockholm – music from Final Fantasy VI, VII and X (concert performed by the Royal Stockholm Philharmonic Orchestra)
- 2014 Symphonic Legends London – music from The Legend of Zelda (concert performed by the London Symphony Orchestra)
- 2014 Final Symphony Tampere – music from Final Fantasy VI, VII and X (concert performed by the Tampere Philharmonic Orchestra)

== Contemporary works (excerpt) ==
- 2003 Unelma Mäntästä (short film)
- 2004 Aukeus! (contemporary music)
- 2005 Mimesis (viola solo)
- 2005 Virtapiirileikki (contemporary music)
- 2006 Production Values (trumpet miniconcerto)
- 2007 Pianosonata I
- 2007 Piece for chamber orchestra and soprano
- 2007 Tales from the kitch – series (solo piano)
- 2008 Tango Nellille (WDR commission work, concert premiere on March 6, 2010)
- 2009 Fanfare overture (WDR commission work, concert premiere on September 12, 2009)
- 2009 .wav for string orchestra
- 2010 End credits for an orchestra (concert premiere on July 10, 2010, with the WDR Radio Orchestra)
- 2010 Fanfare for the Common 8-bit Hero (WDR commission work, concert premiere on July 10, 2010)
- 2013 Culicidae Night (for Male Voice Choir)
- 2017 Tales from the Moominvalley - musical suite for the orchestra, children's choir and soloists (Tampere Philharmonic Orchestra commission work, concert premiere on August 9, 2017)
- 2018 The Blue Bird (cello/piano duo and string orchestra)
- 2019 Song of the Scarlet Flower (Tampere Philharmonic Orchestra commission work, concert premiere on April 12, 2019)

== Theater music (excerpt) ==
- 1998 Dracula
- 1998 The Miser
- 1999 Don Quijote
- 2000 Saituri
- 2001 Tartuffe
- 2004 Circus Sergei
- 2005 Mieletön raamatun historia
- 2006 B. Virtanen
- 2006 Hattifattenerrs Island

== Game soundtracks (excerpt) ==
- 1996 Alien Incident
- 1996 Death Rally
- 1999 Drop Mania
- 1999 Thrust, Twist + Turn
- 1999 Fire Crow
- 2000 Puzzle Station
- 2000 Project S-11
- 2001 3DMark2001 SE (PC Benchmark)
- 2001 Rally Trophy
- 2001 Rampage Puzzle Attack
- 2002 Geopod
- 2002 Wonderland
- 2003 Return to Wonderland
- 2003 Stuntcar Extreme
- 2003 Typer Shark Deluxe
- 2003 Floboarding
- 2003 Wordshark
- 2004 Fathammer Classics Pack
- 2004 Geopod XE
- 2004 Insaniquarium Deluxe
- 2004 Stuntcar Extreme Advanced
- 2005 Toy Golf
- 2005 Fathammer Bowling
- 2005 Rainbow Jek
- 2005 Super Drop Mania
- 2005 Tank Squad
- 2005 The Chronicles of Narnia
- 2005 SpongeBob SquarePants: Krabby Quest
- 2007 Wonderland Adventures
- 2008 Golf: Tee It Up!
- 2009 Stair Dismount 2
- 2010 Need for Madness 2 stage 16
- 2013 Albion Online beta soundtrack
- 2014 Mobile Suit Gundam: Side Stories
- 2015 Cities: Skylines
- 2017 Albion Online orchestral soundtrack
- 2023 Cities: Skylines II

== Discography ==
- 2000 Merregnon Soundtrack, Volume 1 (two compositions, synSONIQ Records)
- 2004 Musicdisk (first solo album)
- 2004 Merregnon Soundtrack, Volume 2 (two compositions, English and Japanese edition, Merregnon Studios/Soulfood Distribution/Dex Entertainment)
- 2007 Number Nine (Turrican 3 Piano Suite arrangement, synSONIQ Records)
- 2008 Symphonic Shades (live concert arrangement and orchestration, Merregnon Studios/synSONIQ Records)
- 2008 Musica e WCCF secondo movimento (live orchestra and choir arrangement and orchestration, Wave Master)
- 2010 Symphonic Fantasies (live concert arrangement and orchestration, Decca Records/Square Enix)
- 2010 Benyamin Nuss plays Uematsu (piano arrangement, Deutsche Grammophon)
- 2012 Symphonic Fantasies Tokyo (live concert arrangement and orchestration, Merregnon Studios/Square Enix)
- 2012 Folk Tunes (Kahden Kauppa composition for Spark, Deutsche Grammophon)
- 2019 Tracked (1991-2000)
- 2022 Space Chase (single)
- 2022 Artificial Love (single)

== Awards ==
- 1992 Assembly: 1st place, Unreal Soundtrack
- 1993 Assembly: 1st place, Second Reality Soundtrack
- 1993 Assembly: 1st place, Sundance
- 1993 Aggressive Party: 1st place, Shadowrun
- 1999 Assembly: 1st place, Credits
- 2002 IFCT Award: Best Original Soundtrack, House by the Sea
- 2006 Isofestival: 2nd place, Mimesis for Viola
- 2007 Adagio Composition Contest: Honorable mention, Elegiac (for string orchestra)
- 2015 Game music awards, Finland 2015: 1st place
- 2017 Game music awards, Finland 2017: 1st place
- 2017 Arts Promotion Centre Finland - Pirkanmaa fine art award, Finland 2017
