= Misko Iho =

Finnish film director (born 1975)

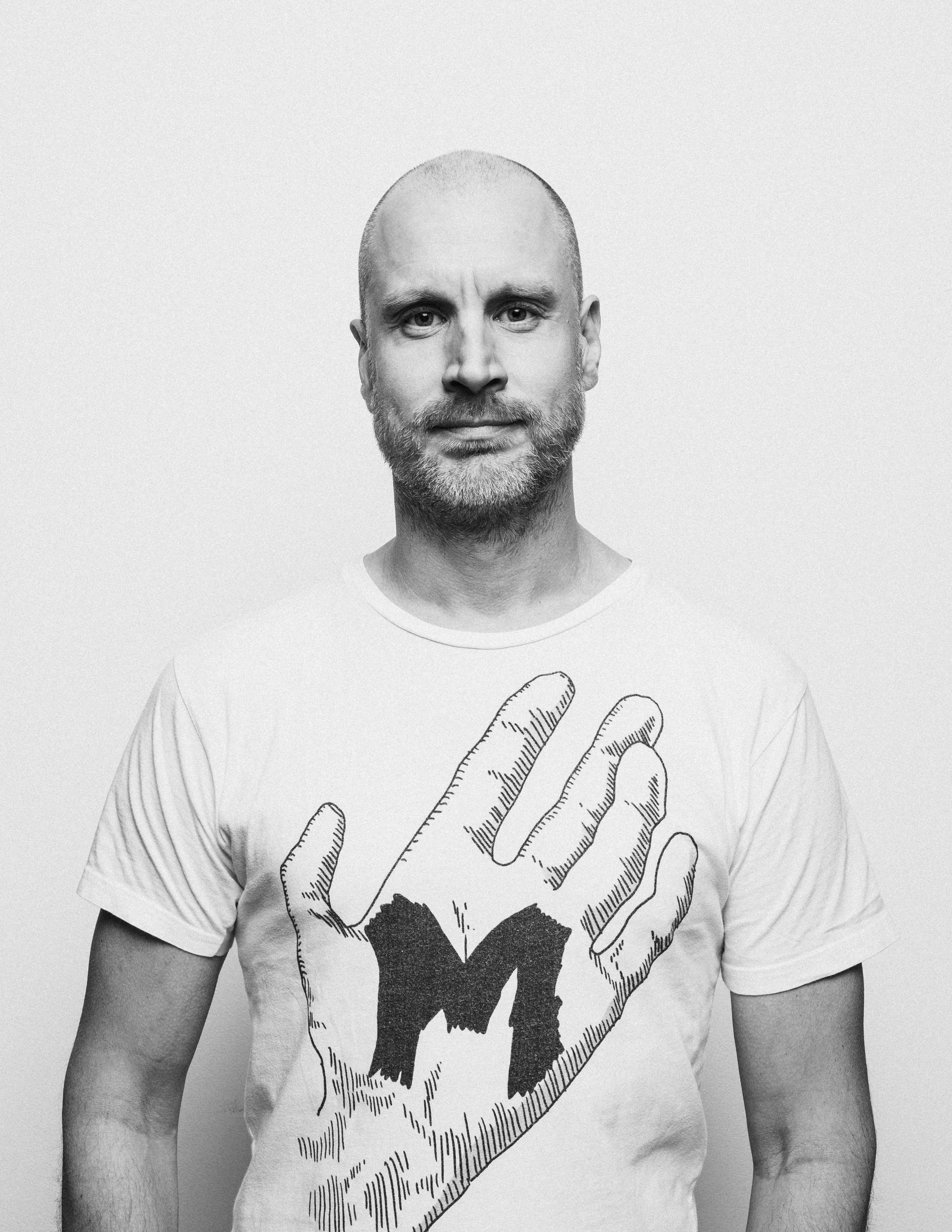
- Iho in 2021
- Born: Mikko Iho; 9 May 1975 (age 51); Helsinki, Finland
- Occupation: Film director
- Years active: 2001–present
- Website: miskoiho.com

Misko Iho (born Mikko Iho; 9 May 1975) is a Finnish film director.

In the mid 1990s, he was part of the computer demo group Future Crew, and later worked designing computer game graphics in the United States. He also worked in organizing a number of music events, and later as a commercial and music video director — winning a number of Finnish and international awards.

== Life and work ==
Misko Iho was born on 9 May 1975, as Mikko Iho in Helsinki. From 1992 to 1994, Iho was a part of a now-defunct computer demo group, Future Crew, as the graphic artist named "Pixel". Noteworthy demos by Future Crew include Unreal (released at Assembly 1992), Panic (released at The Party 1992), and Second Reality (released at Assembly 1993). Slashdot voted Second Reality as one of the "Top 10 Hacks of All Time".

During 1994, Iho spent a few months in the United States designing computer game graphics for the game Epic Pinball by Epic MegaGames as well as Ken's Labyrinth.

From 1997 to 2001, he worked as a visual effects artist and editor creating visual effects for commercials, feature films, and music videos for bands like Bomfunk MC's, JS16 and Darude ("Sandstorm", "Feel the Beat", "Out of Control"). Darude's "Sandstorm" was the best selling 12" worldwide in 2000.

Iho was also busy from 1997 to 2004 running a club concept in Finland called "Screen". During those years, he was involved in organizing over a hundred club events and bringing some of the most-influential club deejays in the world to Finland. Screen guests included deejays like John Digweed, Carl Cox, Deep Dish, Josh Wink, Dave Seaman, Nick Warren, Sander Kleinenberg, Danny Rampling, Steve Lawler, Sister Bliss, and many others.

In 2001, he started working as a commercial and music video director in Finland directing music videos for Finnish artists like Maija Vilkkumaa, Waldo's People, Cristal Snow, Sunrise Avenue, Dallas Superstars, Jenni Vartiainen, Kristiina Wheeler, Haloo Helsinki!, and J. Karjalainen. His most-known Finnish works include the commercial film series for the Finnish Railways and award-winning music videos for the Finnish singer Chisu.

In 2010, Iho's music video for the Finnish singer Chisu was chosen as the 'Music Video of the Year' in Finland at the annual Muuvi Awards organized by IFPI (International Federation of the Phonographic Industry). The video also won the Audience Award. In 2012, he won the 'Music Video of the Year' award at the Emma Awards for his music video "Sabotage" by Chisu. In 2011, 2012, and 2013, he received Honorable Mentions at the Oulu Music Video Festival for his music videos for Haloo Helsinki!, Chisu, and J. Karjalainen. In 2014, he also served as the head of the jury at the same festival.

In 2010, his debut short film Potilas (The Patient) was awarded of "Best Direction" at the Super Shorts International Film Festival in London and in 2011 as the "Best short film" at the Byron Bay Film Festival in Australia.

After 2010, Iho advanced his career in commercial film direction outside Finland and especially in the United States, known for his work for Disney and his skills working with CGI characters and productions with complex post-production requirements. Notable projects include the commercial "The Cell" for Lidl, earning him 'Director of the Year' and 'Grand Prix' awards at the 2018 Finnish Commercial Film Awards and commercial films featuring CGI monsters for the American allergy medicine brand Flonase.

Iho's collaboration with Disney began in 2015, when he worked with Vancouver-based post-production house The Embassy Visual Effects, Industrial Light & Magic, and cinematographer Simon Duggan on a commercial featuring elements from the Star Wars universe and Marvel Comics character Iron Man for Disney's interactive toy brand, Playmation.

In 2023, Iho joined the roster of American commercial production company Wild Gift Content with his Finnish colleague director Pete Riski, founded in 2020 by David Mitchell, former managing director of Ridley Scott's RSA Films.

His collaboration with Disney continued in 2023 on a commercial for Mickey's Toontown, and Iho worked with Blockhead VFX in New Zealand, Walt Disney Animation Studios, and lead animator Eric Goldberg to integrate classic hand drawn 2D characters like Mickey Mouse, Donald Duck, and Goofy into live-action settings filmed in Disneyland with cinematographer Bojan Bazelli.

== Selected filmography ==
=== Short films ===
==== The Patient (2010) ====
Best Direction

- Super Shorts International Film Festival – UK 2010

Best Short Film

- Byron Bay International Film Festival – Australia 2011

Best International Actor – Jani Volanen

- Cinefiesta – Puerto Rico 2011

Official Selections

- Helsinki International Film Festival – Finland 2010
- Lone Star International Film Festival – USA 2010
- The Stepping Stone Film Festival – India 2010
- Hollywood Reel Independent Film Festival – USA 2010
- Super Shorts International Film Festival – UK 2010
- FEC Gambrils-Reues XIII European Short Film Festival – Spain 2011
- The Magnolia Independent Film Festival – USA 2011
- Tampere Film Festival – Finland 2011
- Byron Bay International Film Festival – Australia 2011
- Palm Beach International Film Festival – USA 2011
- European Short Film Festival at MIT – USA 2011
- Riverside International Film Festival – USA 2011
- Manlleu Short Film Festival – Spain 2011
- Boston LGBT Film Festival – USA 2011
- Festival Mas Sorrer – Spain 2011
- Cinefiesta – Puerto Rico 2011
- Vimeo – Staff Pick 2011
- International Sci-Fi & Fantasy Film Festival of Athens – Greece 2012

=== Music videos ===
2003

- "I Feel Love" by Dallas Superstars

2007

- "Scarred" by Cristal Snow
- "Pump It Up" by Cristal Snow

2008

- " Lose Control" by Waldo's People (Eurovision 2009 Finland)
- "Silent Despair" by Anna Abreu
- "Annie and I" by Kristiina Wheeler
- "Luokkakokous" by Maija Vilkkumaa
- "Suojatiellä" by Maija Vilkkumaa
- "China Cool" by Cristal Snow
- "Sunny Day" by Kristiina Wheeler
- "Muut" by Chisu
- "Can't Save Me" by Cristal Snow

2009

- "Adwoa Fowaah" by Bredren B (Ghana)
- "Life" by Bredren B (Ghana)
- "Welcome to My Life" by Sunrise Avenue
- "Baden-Baden" by Chisu
- "Padayu (Falling)" by Khaki (Russia)

2010

- "Pimeä onni" by Jippu & Samuli Edelmann
- "Linnunrata" by CMX
- "Kunnon syy" by Irina & Maija Vilkkumaa
- "Nettiin" by Jenni Vartiainen
- "Killing Me" by Cristal Snow
- "I Wanna Be a Rockstar" by Waldo's People

2011

- "Kohtalon oma" by Chisu
- "Sabotage" by Chisu
- "I Don't Dance" by Sunrise Avenue
- "Kokeile minua" by Haloo Helsinki!

2012

- "Eva" by Jippu

2013

- "Sydänlupaus" by J. Karjalainen

== Sports career ==
Skydiving (2004–present)

Awards

- Silver – Freeflying at Finnish National Skydiving Championships 2007
- Silver – Freeflying at Finnish National Skydiving Championships 2008
- Gold – Freeflying at Finnish National Skydiving Championships 2009

Records

- Finnish national vertical record 14-way (2010)
- Finnish national vertical record 20-way (2011)
- Nordic vertical record 39-way (2011)
- European vertical record 80-way (2011)
- Florida state vertical record 42-way (2011)
