= Octogeddon =

2018 video game

- Developer: All Yes Good
- Publisher: All Yes Good
- Designer: George Fan
- Programmer: Kurt Pfeifer
- Artist: Rich Werner
- Composer: Jimmy Hinson
- Platforms: Windows; Switch
- Release: February 8, 2018: Windows; May 16, 2019: Switch
- Genres: Action, strategy

Octogeddon is an action and strategy video game with elements of roguelike games developed by All Yes Good. It was released for Microsoft Windows in February 2018 and Nintendo Switch in 2019. The player controls an octopus who is seeking vengeance against humanity. It fights using tentacles that can be upgraded between each stage.

The game was designed by George Fan who previously designed Insaniquarium and Plants vs. Zombies. After getting laid off from PopCap Games, he came up with the idea for Octogeddon for a Ludum Dare contest in 2012. Fan formed a company along with Rich Werner and Kurt Pfeffer called All Yes Good to further develop the game. The game received positive reception for its humorous art style and its addictive gameplay and is often compared to Plants vs. Zombies.

== Gameplay ==
An ocean stage is currently in progress. The octopus can defend himself by rotating himself to aim various forms of weaponized limbs against enemies.

Octogeddon is an arcade-style action and strategy video game, with elements of roguelike games. The player plays as a titular octopus, named Octogeddon, who decides to seek vengeance against humanity after watching a video of a chef cooking sushi. Octogeddon goes through five stages, each divided up into six levels. The first three levels take place in the ocean and the last three levels take place on land. The octopus has limbs that can be used to attack enemies as the octopus progresses through each level. Octogeddon has to be rotated in order to aim the limbs and deal damage to the enemies. Octogeddon has a certain number of hit points that will be lost if the octopus is hit by an enemy. If all the hit points are lost, Octogeddon will lose a life. There is a permadeath aspect to this game: if all the lives are lost, the game has to be restarted.

Between each stage, the player can buy Octogeddon more powerful limbs or abilities using coins picked up during the stage. New lives can also be purchased using coins. The limbs the player can give the octopus is selected at random. Between each game, the player can spend shells on more lives, more hit points, and DNA; which allows the player to select from a higher number of limbs between each level. Between each playthrough of the game, stronger enemies are introduced to the earlier levels of the game.

== Development and release ==
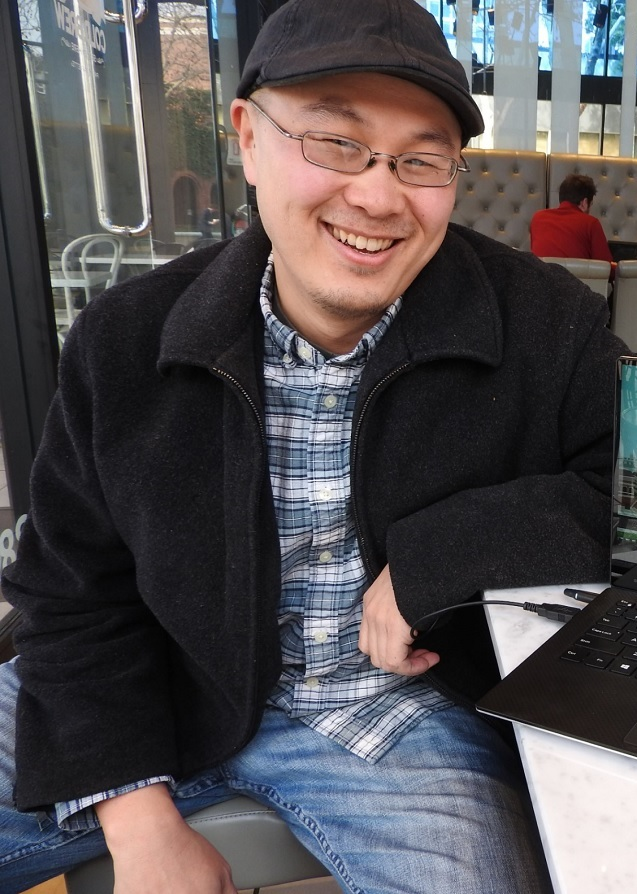
George Fan began working on Octogeddon days after being laid off from PopCap Games.

Before developing Octogeddon, George Fan designed Insaniquarium and Plants vs. Zombies for PopCap Games. PopCap Games was bought by Electronic Arts in July 2011. On August 21, 2012, fifty employees, including Fan, were laid off from PopCap as part of refocusing on freemium games for social media and mobile devices.

Days after he was laid off, George Fan started working on a video game called Octogeddon for the 2012 Ludum Dare contest. Ludum Dare contests involve having a designer create a video game from scratch in 48 hours with the theme picked for the particular year. The theme for the 2012 contest was "evolution". In order to match the theme, Fan decided to create a video game where the character was constantly "evolving" by attracting new limbs to the character, each with their own function, until the character was a "massive shooting machine". Octogeddon was met with positive reception in the contest, inspiring George Fan to continue work on the game for several more years.

In order to create Octogeddon, Fan, along with Rich Werner and Kurt Pfeifer, founded the company All Yes Good. Werner was the artist for Plants vs. Zombies while Kurt Pfeffer was the programmer for the Xbox 360 port of Plants vs. Zombies. A few years after the prototype was created, All Yes Good started officially developing the game, with Fan as the designer, Werner as the artist, and Pfeifer as the programmer. The soundtrack was provided by the Jimmy Hinson.

In December 2017, Fan started a closed-beta of Octogeddon consisting of players who "pester[ed] George on Twitter". That same month, PCGamesN, a news site dedicated to PC gaming, offered to give away eight beta Steam codes for people to be able to get Octogeddon before its release. Octogeddon was released on Steam on February 8, 2018. A Nintendo Switch port was released on May 16, 2019.

== Reception ==
Reception

Aggregate score
Aggregator	Score
Metacritic	82/100

Review scores
Publication	Score
Destructoid	7.5/10
VentureBeat	90/100
Australian Broadcasting Corporation	7/10
Common Sense Media	4/5

Octogeddon has received "generally positive" reviews. It holds an aggregate score of 82/100 on Metacritic. John Walker of Rock, Paper, Shotgun and Chris Carter of Destructoid both compared the game to Fan's previous game, Plants vs. Zombies. They noticed similarities in art style and gameplay structure of starting small and slowly adding more to the challenge of the game, but they didn't think that Octogeddon was as good as Plants vs. Zombies. Walker said that Octogeddon was "not the sure-fire hit that Plants vs. Zombies once was." Carter said that Octogeddon did not have the replay value that Plants vs. Zombies had.

Nonetheless, the gameplay and art style were praised. Dean Takahashi from VentureBeat found the gameplay, consisting of a titular octopus destroying everything, to be "satisfying" and Common Sense Media found the gameplay to be "addictive". Walker and Carter found the game to be underwhelming at the beginning, but fun and enjoyable after a while. Angharad Yeo from the Australian Broadcasting Corporation criticised the gameplay, finding the permadeath aspect of Octogeddon, forcing the player to play the first level over and over again, to be "grindy" and "dissatisfying". Takahashi, Walker, and Carter shared a similar viewpoint, despite them finding the game to be otherwise enjoyable.

Meanwhile, Yeo's co-reviewer, Gemma Discroll, did not mind the permadeath aspect of the game and believed the game was about "replayability". Octogeddon was also criticized by Takahashi and Walker for its occasional crashes, and by Carter for its glitches. The art style was found to be silly and humorous, especially in the form in the Octogeddon himself. However, Walker felt that the enemy design offered "no delights", especially when compared to the art style of the octopus.
