= Stareater =

Stareater may refer to:

- Stareater, a fish from the Antarctic Ocean
- Stareater, a mollusc-like creature from the game Insaniquarium
