= Volleyball (disambiguation) =

Volleyball is an indoor team sport.

Volleyball may also refer to:

- Beach volleyball, an outdoor pairs team game
- Volleyball (ball), the ball used in volleyball
- Volleyball (video game), a video game for the Nintendo Entertainment System
- Volleyball!, 1980 volleyball video game for the Magnavox Odyssey 2
- A game similar to standard volleyball, see Volleyball variations
- Volleying a ball, a maneuver used in several games using balls:
  - Volley (association football)
  - Volley (tennis)
- The bullet used in a volley gun
- "Volleyball", an episode of the animated series Steven Universe Future
