= Pekka Kana 2 =

2004 video game

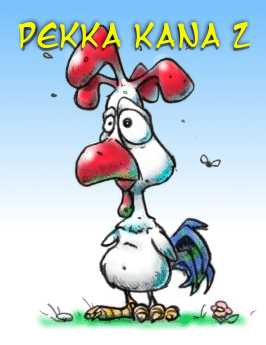
- Developer: Pistez Gamez
- Designer: Janne Kivilahti
- Composer: Janne Kivilahti
- Platforms: Microsoft Windows, Linux, macOS, Android
- Release: 2003
- Genre: Platformer
- Mode: Single-player

Pekka Kana 2 is a platformer video game developed by the Finnish studio Pistez Gamez and released as freeware in 2003. The game placed second in the Assembly '03 Game Development Competition.

The game includes level editor that allows users to create their own custom levels, in which they can place custom graphics, power-ups and enemies.

Pekka Kana 2 is the sequel to Pekka Kana, which was released in 1998. The developers had begun work on a sequel (Pekka Kana 3), but it was decided to put it on hold.

== Plot ==
As in many other platformers, the plot is extremely simple and is explained in the game manual.

Rooster Island 1

Pekka is a rooster who lives on a farm in Finland with his chicken friends. Pekka's job is to watch over his chicken friends to make sure nothing goes wrong, until one day, Pekka discovers that all the hens have been kidnapped by an evil crow known as "The Evil One". Pekka's mission in the first episode is to rescue his friends from the antagonist by making his way through animals hypnotized by him, with the goal of eliminating Pekka Kana, jumping from platform to platform while avoiding extremely dangerous obstacles such as flames and bottomless chasms.

Rooster Island 2

Rooster Island 2 explains why the hens were kidnapped: for some reason, they are immune to the control device that The Evil One uses to hypnotize and control the other animals. The crow loves experimenting with voodoo magic and genetic manipulation, and some time after the events of the first episode, he returned with an even more powerful control device capable of hypnotizing even the chickens.

With the help of an army of mechanical chickens, he will launch a new attack on the farm, kidnapping Pekka's friends once again. Pekka will therefore have to jump into action once more to destroy The Evil One's latest mechanical contraption and save his friends once and for all from the winged clutches of his arch-enemy.

== Game Structure ==
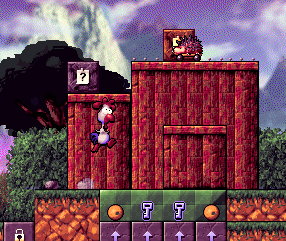
Pekka mid-jump on Hedgehog River level from Rooster Island 1. Enemy Hedgehog on the platform above.

The game is divided into two episodes: Rooster Island 1 and Rooster Island 2.

When you select one of the two episodes, a map will appear showing the levels it contains. If you hover over a level, you'll see its name and the record time you need to beat to earn the corresponding achievement upon completing it.

Within the level, you'll control Pekka, who can run, jump, and glide - skills that will be very useful for avoiding the many obstacles standing between the protagonist and the exit sign at the end of the level. Throughout the level, you can collect power-ups in the form of megaphones and eggs, which will grant Pekka the ability to fire a noise projectile that damages enemies and the ability to bomb enemies with eggs from above. The megaphones and eggs are available in numerous variations.

During his journey, Pekka will encounter a variety of enemies in the form of hypnotized animals, each with its own distinctive behavior. This behavior varies depending on the animal's color.
