= Uusitalo (surname) =

Uusitalo is a Finnish surname. Notable people with the surname include:

- Eino Uusitalo (1924–2015), Finnish politician
- Arja Uusitalo (born 1951), Finnish poet and journalist
- Sami Uusitalo (born 1977), Finnish bass guitarist
- Ville Uusitalo (born 1979), Finnish professional ice hockey defenceman
- Markus Uusitalo (born 1997), Finnish professional footballer
