= Volleyball! =

1980 video game

- Developer: Magnavox
- Publishers: NA: Magnavox; PAL: Philips
- Designer: Ed Averett
- Platform: Odyssey²/Videopac
- Release: NA: August 1980; PAL: 1981
- Genre: Sports (Volleyball)
- Modes: Single-player, Multi-player

Volleyball!, known in Europe as Videopac 28 - Electronic Volleyball, is a 1980 volleyball video game created by Ed Averett and published by Magnavox and Philips for the Magnavox Odyssey 2 also known as the Philips Videopac G7000. Players either compete with each other or a computer opponent by controlling six volleyball players simultaneously. The game received mixed reviews from critics, some of whom praised its attempt to recreate the feel of the original sport while others criticized it for being too much like Pong.

== Gameplay ==
Players take control of an entire teams worth of players who must pass a ball back and forth to each other while keeping the ball from falling to the bottom of their side of the court. The game is played from an isometric perspective, with the net represented by a line that travels most of the way up the center of the court. All six teammates are controlled at once as a unit. The ball bounces off the walls and net in a similar manner to the ball from Pong and can only be received by teammates who are currently moving. Players can pass the ball to one team member to another, serve the ball over the net, or spike the ball by pressing the action button the instant a teammate receives the ball. Volleyball! includes both a single-player mode against a computer opponent and a two player versus mode.

A screenshot from Volleyball!

== Reception ==
Writing for "Arcade Alley", a column of Video, Bill Kunkel and Arnie Katz said Volleyball was proof that "a cartridge can be a bad simulation but an excellent game." They applauded the inclusion of a one player mode. In contrast Electronic Games 1983 Software Encyclopedia called it "probably the closest approach to the real sport to be found in the videogame world." They called it a simple game but thought the on-screen characters and sound effects made it a more entertaining package. Paul Kupperberg writing for Video Action thought the game's sound effects were "interesting".

French magazine Tilt did not like the large size of the players and the ball, which take up the entire court. They found it to be impossible to miss the ball. Brett Weiss in 2011 called it a "dumbed down version of the sport it is trying to emulate" considering the game to be essentially a variation on Pong.
