= Jaana Pelkonen =

Finnish politician and TV presenter (b. 1977)

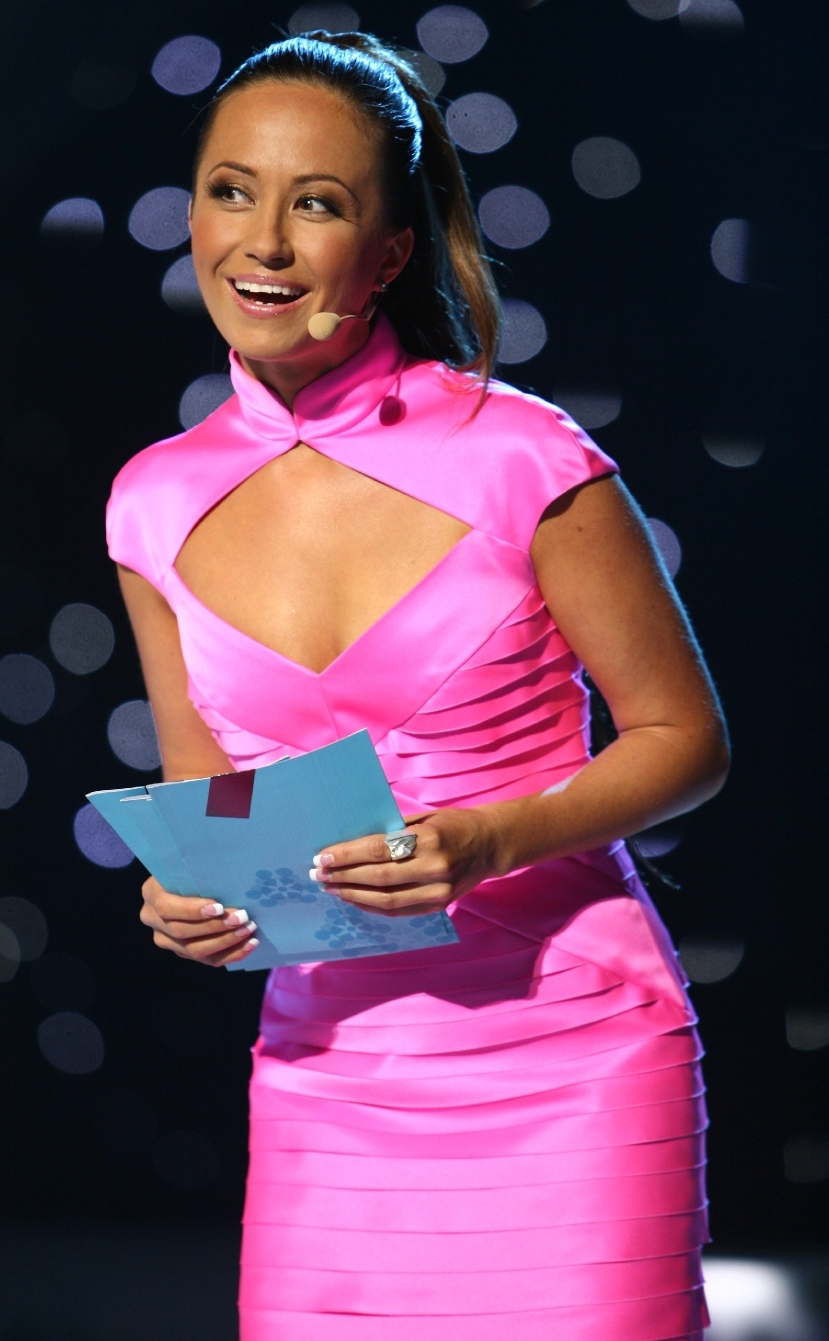
- Jaana Pelkonen presenting the Eurovision 2007 semifinal in Helsinki

Member of the Finnish Parliament for Helsinki
- In office 20 April 2011 – 4 April 2023

Personal details
- Born: Jaana Maarit Pelkonen; 27 January 1977 (age 49) Lahti, Päijät-Häme, Finland
- Party: National Coalition Party
- Occupation: Politician

Jaana Pelkonen (born 27 January 1977) is a Finnish politician and television presenter.

== Career ==
Pelkonen's media career started as a radio presenter for Radio 99 in Lahti in 1995–1997. She became famous in Finland as the host of the video gaming show Tilt in 1997–2005 and the youth program Jyrki in 1998. In 2001–2002 she hosted an entertainment travel show called FarOut. She has also hosted the Finnish qualifications of the Eurovision Song Contest for five years. On 12 May 2007 Pelkonen hosted the Eurovision Song Contest 2007 together with Mikko Leppilampi. She also gave the Finnish votes in the Eurovision Dance Contest 2008 held in Glasgow, Scotland which was the second ever Dance Contest.

She earned her master's degree in political science from Helsinki University in 2007, after graduation she worked as an assistant for the Finnish Minister of Communications Suvi Lindén.

Pelkonen received attention in Finland when she took part in the 2008 local elections. She was elected to Helsinki City Council with 3,518 votes, the 15th highest vote total in the nation. She was also the highest ranking celebrity amongst the candidates for local councillors. She was further elected to the Finnish parliament in 2011 representing the National Coalition Party.

In 2015 parliamentary election Pelkonen got the highest vote total in Helsinki and the highest vote total of all female candidates in the nation. She was re-elected in 2019 parliamentary election with 10,563 votes. In February 2020, Pelkonen announced that she would not run in the next parliamentary election.

In autumn 2018, Pelkonen competed in Dances with Stars, the Finnish version of the dance contest Strictly Come Dancing, and placed sixth.

== Electoral history ==
=== Municipal elections ===
Year	Constituency	Votes	Percentage	Result
2008	Helsinki	3,518	1.27%	Elected
2012	Helsinki	3,156	1.11%	Elected
2017	Helsinki	6,519	2.00%	Elected

=== Parliamentary elections ===
Year	Constituency	Votes	Percentage	Result
2011	Helsinki	5,897	1.70%	Elected
2015	Helsinki	15,964	4.44%	Elected
2019	Helsinki	10,563	2.72%	Elected

== See also ==
- List of Eurovision Song Contest presenters

Preceded by (Greece) Sakis Rouvas & Maria Menounos	Eurovision Song Contest presenter (with Mikko Leppilampi); 2007	Succeeded by (Serbia) Jovana Janković & Željko Joksimović
