= Tilt =

Tilt may refer to:

== Music ==
- Tilt (American band), a punk rock group, formed in 1992
- Tilt (British band), an electronic music group, formed in 1993
- Tilt (Polish band), a rock band, formed in 1979

=== Albums ===
- Tilt (Cozy Powell album), 1981
- Tilt (Scott Walker album), 1995
- Tilt (Greg Howe and Richie Kotzen album), 1995
- Tilt (The Lightning Seeds album), 1999
- Tilt (Kahimi Karie album), 2000
- Tilt (Confidence Man album), 2022
- Tilt (EP), by Red Velvet - Irene & Seulgi

=== Songs ===
- "Tilt" a 2008 song by In Flames from A Sense of Purpose
- "Christine", also known as "Tilted", by Christine and the Queens, 2014

== Film and television ==
- Tilt (1979 film), a 1979 American film
- Tilt (2011 film), a 2011 Bulgarian film
- Tilt (American TV series), a U.S. drama television series
- Tilt (Finnish TV series), a Finnish video gaming programme

== Photography ==
- Tilt (camera), a cinematographic technique in which the camera is stationary and rotates in a vertical plane (or tilting plane)
- Tilt (view camera)
- Tilt–shift photography, use of selective focus, e.g., for simulating a miniature scene

== Games and sports ==
- Tilt (arcade), a chain of video arcades inside various shopping malls
- Tilt (French magazine), a video game publication (1982–1994)
- Tilt (Finnish magazine), a video game publication (2004–2005)
- Tilt (poker), a poker term for a state of mental or emotional confusion or frustration in which a player adopts a less-than-optimal strategy
- Luke Tilt (born 1988), English football player
- A penalty condition in pinball
- Jousting encounter by horseback mounted competitors using lances

== Other uses ==
- River Tilt, a river in Perth and Kinross, Scotland
- Tilt (wagon), a word for canopy on a wagon, boat or stall
- Axial tilt in astronomy
- Tilt.com, a crowdfunding company that rebranded to Tilt in 2014 from its former name of Crowdtilt
- Tilt (drink), an alcoholic beverage launched in the US market in August 2005
- Tilt (optics), a deviation in the direction of a beam of light
- Tilt (radio), a topical sketch show
- AT&T Tilt, a smartphone
- Tilt switch, an electrical switch
- Tilt table test, a medical procedure often used to diagnose dysautonomia or syncope
- Tilting train, a train with a mechanism for leaning
- Toxicant-induced loss of tolerance, a medical condition
- Tilting theory in mathematics, including tilting modules, tilted algebras, tilting functors, and so on
- Tilt (novel), a novel by Ellen Hopkins
- Tilts, a hamlet in South Yorkshire, England
- John Hancock Center's Tilting Observatory in Chicago, Illinois
- In the nomenclature of political forecasting, a "tilt" seat is one in which one particular party is deemed to have a very slight lead in electoral polls
