= Arja Uusitalo =

Finnish poet and journalist

Arja Uusitalo (born 10 July 1951 in Helsinki) is a Finnish poet and journalist.

She moved to Sweden and attended the Stockholm University, studying social anthropology, pedagogy, the Finnish language and economic history. She went to Poppius Journalist School to work as journalist. Uusitalo published poems in Swedish and Finnish magazines and worked in Swedish Radio. In 1992, a documentary film was made about her on Finnish television. Arja won a prize for her libretto which was composed by Oliver Kohlenberg and played in Kärsämäki in July 2000.

== Selected works ==
- Medan nattens leoparder, 1984
- Och klappar kaoset om ryggen, 1986
- Puutarhallinen lohdutusta eksyneille, 1987
- Syrjäytetyt minät, 1988
- Pyysit miniatyyriä, 1992
- Meren syli, 1992 (photographs by Tuija Lindström)
- Turvapaikka, 2000 (opera libretto, composed by Oliver Kohlenberg)
- Come-back, 2000
- Tukholmalainen Blogikirja, 2006
- Äkillinen oivallus, 2008
- Tukholmalaisnovelleja, 2008

Vainajat nauravat kuorossa, 2010
