= BitBoys =

Bitboys Oy was a hardware development and licensing company based in Finland, founded in 1991 and acquired by ATI Technologies for up to US$44M on May 2, 2006. Until the acquisition, Bitboys had focused on mobile phone gaming, and had developed a large vector graphics-related portfolio.

Bitboys was formed by some of the members of the demogroup Future Crew.

Bitboys became infamous after the 1999 announcement of their Glaze3D series of graphics cards, which later turned out to be vaporware. When Infineon Technologies shut down its embedded DRAM production line, Bitboys quickly transformed from PC desktop graphics chip business to mobile graphics IP business. They could not find another manufacturer capable of producing the part because of the high amount of embedded DRAM used.

After the merger of ATI into the AMD Graphics Product Group, the entire BitBoys Oy team was acquired by Qualcomm on January 22, 2009, following the sale of AMD Imageon intellectual property to Qualcomm.
