= George Fan =

American video game designer (born 1978)

- Fan in 2018
- Born: 1978 (age 47–48)
- Education: University of California, Berkeley
- Occupations: Video game designer; Creative director
- Years active: 2000–present
- Notable work: Insaniquarium; Plants vs. Zombies; Octogeddon

George Fan (born 1978) is an American video game designer who currently works as the creative director of All Yes Good. He designed Insaniquarium (2001), Plants vs. Zombies (2009) (which started the video game franchise of the same name), Octogeddon (2018), and Hardhat Wombat (2023). Before going into game design, Fan graduated from the University of California, Berkeley, in 2000 with a degree in computer science. After graduating, he worked under Arcade Planet to develop games for their website, Prizegames.com. He eventually formed Flying Bear Entertainment and created Insaniquarium, which became a finalist for the 2002 Independent Games Festival. He then joined Blizzard Entertainment and worked there while simultaneously developing Insaniquarium further for PopCap Games, releasing the "Deluxe" edition in 2004.

Fan left Blizzard and started developing Plants vs. Zombies. He became a full-time employee for PopCap, who supplied Fan with a team. Upon release in 2009, it became the best-selling game developed by PopCap. EA bought PopCap Games in 2011 and Fan was laid off in 2012. Fan started developing Octogeddon and submitted it to the 2012 Ludum Dare contest. Fan formed a developing company named All Yes Good with Rich Werner and Kurt Pfeffer and developed Octogeddon further before releasing it in 2018. Fan then developed Hardhat Wombat, which was released on October 26, 2023.

== Early life and education ==
Fan was born in 1978. He grew up with his brother and lived with their father. George Fan attended the University of California, Berkeley and graduated with a degree in computer science in 2000.

== Career ==
=== 2000–2001: Early career ===
Fan first worked as creator of Java video games for the online gaming portal, Prizegames.com, created by the company Arcade Planet. Fan describes the website as "an online version of Chuck E. Cheese". The first video game he designed was the puzzle game, Wrath of the Gopher, released in 2001. Fan said to Chris Carter, editor-in-chief of Destructoid, that before creating Wrath of the Gopher, he was unsure of whether or not he could be a game designer.

=== 2001–2012: PopCap Games ===
While researching Java games, Fan discovered PopCap Games and took a liking to their game library. In 2001, Fan and Tysen Henderson founded Flying Bear Entertainment in California to work on a virtual pets video game project named FishTank. Fan wanted to create a game "that's easy to get into, yet unfolds into something much deeper." Flying Bear Entertainment published it on August 31, 2001, as a free Java-based online game called Insaniquarium. Fan entered the game into the 2002 Independent Games Festival, to which it became a finalist for. At the finalist booth at Game Developers Conference 2002 (GDC 2002), PopCap Games offered Fan help in making Insaniquarium a downloadable game. Insaniquarium won in the category of "Innovation in Game Design".

At the time, Fan was looking for a job at Blizzard Entertainment. Blizzard allowed Fan to work on Insaniquarium on his breaks from working with them. Because he was a freelance video game designer at the time, Fan was forced to do a majority of the programming and designing of Insaniquarium, along with composing some of the music. With PopCap Games as the publisher, Insaniquarium was released on 2004 for the PC, titled Insaniquarium: Deluxe (Note: The manual for Insaniquarium puts the released date at September 1, 2004. However, the official website of Flying Bear Entertainment announced the release of Insaniquarium for the Microsoft Windows on August 30, 2004, and for Mac OS X on October 16, 2004.) and was met with critical and financial success. The game was downloaded 20 million times on PC by April 2006, and was released for mobile phones by Glu Mobile in the United States on April 13, 2006, and in Europe on June 29, 2006. The game was also released for Palm OS and Windows Mobile phones and personal digital assistants on August 6, 2008.

Fan worked for Blizzard for two and a half years. He was tasked with programming AI and designing enemies for Diablo III during this time. It was not long after Insaniquarium was released that Fan realized that he was more of a designer than a programmer. Fan tried to become a designer at Blizzard, though found it hard to persuade other employees to his ideas, leading him to conclude that he preferred to work in smaller teams.

Fan left Blizzard to become an independent game designer for a year. Fan eventually became inspired by his project Insaniquarium and Warcraft III mods to create a new game. Fan thought about creating a defense-oriented version of Insaniquarium for the Nintendo DS utilizing its dual-screen. However, after playing Warcraft III tower defense mods, he wondered if plants could make good defensive structures. Fan wanted to bring new concepts to the tower defense genre and found enemies ignoring the defensive structures unintuitive, which led to the use of lanes. The enemies, though initially planned to be aliens from Insaniquarium, became zombies to make the game distinctive from other plant games. The working title was Weedlings. After the enemies were changed from aliens to zombies, the game was renamed Plants vs. Zombies.

Initially, Fan worked on Plants vs. Zombies independently. He became a full-time employee for PopCap Games after they convinced him that joining them would help him make the best game. PopCap set Fan up with a team consisting of Tod Semple, Rich Werner, and Laura Shigihara, who each filled the role of programmer, artist, and composer respectively; Fan would also voice the game's tutorial character, named "Crazy Dave" after David Rohrl, himself. Plants vs. Zombies took three and a half years to make. Aside from Insaniquarium and Warcraft III, Plants vs. Zombies was influenced by the arcade game Tapper, the card game Magic: the Gathering, and the film Swiss Family Robinson. A critical aspect of developing was designing the game to be balanced between casual and hardcore gaming.

Plants vs. Zombies was released on May 5, 2009, for the PC and Mac OS X. The game garnered positive reception from critics, being assigned an aggregate score of 87/100 by Metacritic. It quickly became the best-selling video game developed by PopCap Games. James Gwertzman, the vice president of the Asia/Pacific division of PopCap, revealed in a presentation at GDC China 2010 that the game had sold 1.5 million copies internationally. Plants vs. Zombies has been ported to various platforms, including the iOS, Xbox 360, and Nintendo DS.

There were various other projects designed by Fan for PopCap that were either canceled or unannounced. One of them was a role-playing video game called Yeti Train, which was rumored to become a new franchise after a trademark for the title was filed by PopCap in 2009, though in March 2011, David Roberts, CEO of PopCap, declined there being any plans to release new franchises. Another game in production was Full Contact Bingo.

On July 12, 2011, PopCap and its assets were bought by Electronic Arts (EA) for $750 million. EA envisioned Plants vs. Zombies as a major franchise, with the sequel using a freemium model, which resulted in Fan losing interest in Plants vs. Zombies. According to Jason Schreier of Kotaku, when EA directed PopCap towards making free-to-play games with transactions, "Fan no longer fit in." On August 21, 2012, 50 employees either left or were laid off from PopCap's Seattle studio, with studios in Dublin; Shanghai; and San Mateo, California — where Fan worked at the time — closing. Fan was laid off during this time after months of discussion from PopCap's management team. A circulating rumor that Fan was fired because of his opposition to EA's freemium model was based on a statement by Edmund McMillen, the creator of The Binding of Isaac and Super Meat Boy. Fan refused to comment publicly on the truth of this story. He later clarified in an AMA on Reddit that while he disagreed with the freemium model of Plants VS Zombies 2, he was not fired over this belief and that he preferred to develop independent games with smaller teams.

=== 2012–present: Post-PopCap Games ===
After leaving PopCap Games due to his lay-off on August 21, 2012, Fan created the arcade-style action video game Octogeddon for the 2012 Ludum Dare Game Jam, a type of Hackathon where developers have to create a game in a short amount of time within a specific theme. For Ludum Dare, it was 48 hours. The 2012 theme was "evolution"; Fan designed Octogeddon to fit that theme by having the octopus gain weaponized limbs over time. The game was met with positive reception in the jam, inspiring Fan to work on the game more. He formed the indie video game company, All Yes Good, along with Werner — the artist for Plants vs. Zombies — and Kert Pfeffer — the programmer of the Xbox 360 port of Plants vs. Zombies. All Yes Good developed Octogeddon for the next four years.

Fan served as the designer, Werner served as the artist, and Pfeffer served as the programmer for Octogeddon. Jimmy Hinson provided the soundtrack. Octogeddon was released on February 8, 2018, for the video game digital distribution service, Steam. The game was met with positive reception, having a score of 82/100 on Metacritic. It was ported to the Nintendo Switch on May 16, 2019. Fan is currently listed as the creative director of All Yes Good.

== Personal life ==
Fan lives in California; he went to University of California, Berkeley, for his college education, was based in San Francisco during the development of Plants vs. Zombies, worked in the San Mateo, California studio of PopCap Games by the time he was laid off on August 21, 2012, and All Yes Good is currently based in Redwood Shores, California. Fan's hobbies include playing Magic: The Gathering and Lego building. He designed the card Genesis Hydra for the Magic: The Gathering core set Magic 2015.

== Works ==
Works
Game	Release Date	Genre	Role	Developer	Publisher	Ref.
Wrath of the Gopher	2001	Puzzle	Designer	Arcade Planet	Arcade Planet	
Insaniquarium	August 31, 2001 (Note: The "Deluxe" edition was released in 2004.)	Virtual pets	Designer, programmer, composer	Flying Bear Entertainment	PopCap Games (Note: Flying Bear Entertainment was the publisher before the involvement of PopCap Games following GDC 2002.)	
Plants vs. Zombies	May 5, 2009	Tower defense	Designer	PopCap Games	PopCap Games	
Diablo III	May 15, 2012 (Note: Despite being released in 2012, Fan only worked at Blizzard from 2002 to 2004.)	Role-playing	AI programmer, enemy designer	Blizzard Entertainment	Blizzard Entertainment	
Octogeddon	February 8, 2018	Action	Designer	All Yes Good	All Yes Good	
Hardhat Wombat	2023	Puzzle	Designer	All Yes Good	All Yes Good	

== Other credits ==
Game	Release Date	Genre	Developer	Publisher	Credit
Plants vs. Zombies 2	July 9, 2013	Tower defense	PopCap Games	Electronic Arts	Special thanks
Mewgenics	February 10, 2026	Tactical role-playing, roguelike, life simulation	Edmund McMillen, Tyler Glaiel	Edmund McMillen, Tyler Glaiel	Voice acting, testing
