= Ken's Labyrinth =

1993 video game

- Developer: Ken Silverman
- Publisher: Epic MegaGames
- Designer: Ken Silverman
- Platform: MS-DOS
- Release: NA: January 1, 1993
- Genre: First-person shooter
- Mode: Single-player

Ken's Labyrinth is a first-person shooter for MS-DOS published in 1993 by Epic MegaGames. It was programmed by Ken Silverman, who later designed the Build engine used for rendering in 3D Realms's Duke Nukem 3D (1996). Ken's Labyrinth consists of three episodes, the first of which was released as shareware. An earlier version was self-published by Silverman. In the game, the player assumes the role of a faceless person trying to rescue their dog, Sparky, from a labyrinth.

== Technology ==
Ken's Labyrinth is graphically similar to id Software's Wolfenstein 3D in that the levels were designed using a grid-based plane, resulting in perpendicular walls and textureless floors and ceilings. Arguably its most astounding feature was the existence of interactive sprites and textures, like slot and vending machines. This move towards engines allowing greater interactivity was later elaborated upon by Silverman's Build engine.

Ken's Labyrinth was released as freeware on November 16, 1999. Several different versions were released and are available for download from the official website. The source code followed on July 1, 2001.

== Game versions ==
The first version is known as Walken, the version which Ken Silverman sent to companies for evaluation. This was the first version created, and therefore it had very few features. There was almost no interactivity, and the code was mostly a test.

The first version to be released was a modified version of Walken called Ken's Labyrinth. Many changes were made, including interactivity, an early money system and music. It was sold by Ken directly, using the Advanced Systems company name, a company that Ken's older brother Alan Silverman was involved with.

Following that was version 1.1, which featured 27 levels and an alternate final boss. New enemies, textures and music were added, as well as a money system with which the player could locate money and use it to purchase a random item from a vending machine. Slot machines were also implemented. The game was then submitted to fifteen different software companies, including Silverman's later employer Apogee Software, which appreciated the engine but requested considerable changes to the game.

Released in March 1993 by Epic MegaGames, the final version (2.01) featured 30 levels, and many new features that older versions of the game lacked, such as the ability to choose the item purchased from the vending machines, a difficulty option (on "easy" mode, or "Don't touch me", enemies do not use melee attacks, while on "hard" mode, or "Ouch!" they charge into the player and cause damage), an episode select, and also new enemies, textures and music with additional artwork made by Misko Iho of Future Crew. Silverman later said that Mark Rein of Epic MegaGames added the part of the story involving Sparky.

A Ken's Labyrinth port to modern operating systems such as Windows and Linux using Simple DirectMedia Layer called LAB3D/SDL was created by Jan Lönnberg and released in 2002. A version of the port which includes new higher resolution textures and later adapted for SDL 2 was also created by Katie Stafford. A fork of that version also exists supporting Nintendo Switch. A modern level editor for the game by Kai E. Froland has also been produced, called KKIT/SDL.

== Reception ==
The game was reviewed in 1993 in Dragon #199 by Sandy Petersen in the "Eye of the Monitor" column. Petersen gave the game 2 out of 5 stars.
