= Kristiina Wheeler =

Finnish singer (born 1983)

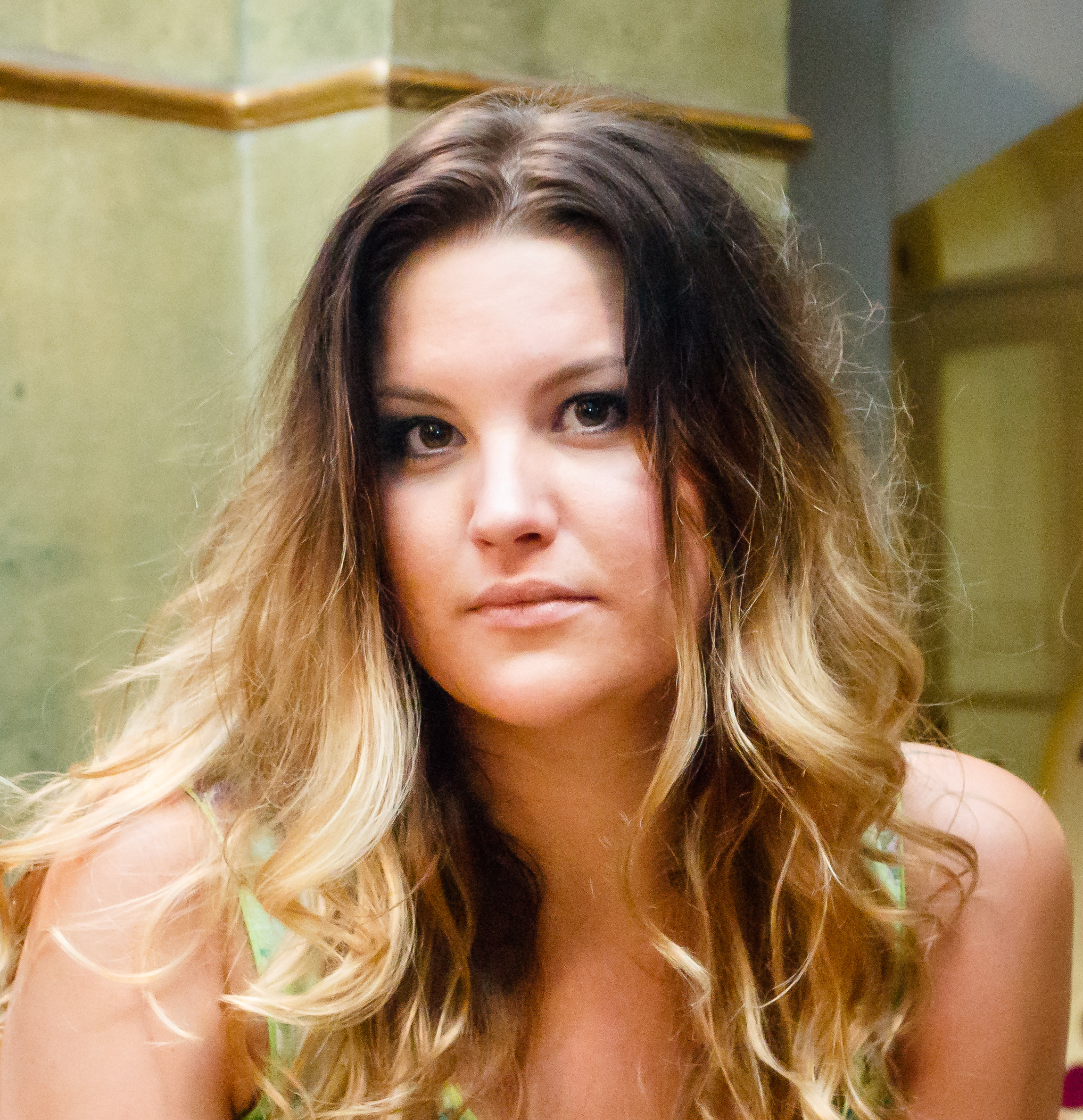
- Wheeler in 2012

Background information
- Born: 8 July 1983 (age 42); Hitchin, Hertfordshire, England
- Origin: Helsinki, Finland
- Genres: Pop
- Occupations: Singer, hostess
- Years active: 2005–present
- Website: www.kristiinawheeler.com

Kristiina Wheeler (born 8 July 1983) is a Finnish pop singer.

== Life and career ==
Wheeler was born to an English father and a Finnish mother in Hitchin, Hertfordshire, England. The family moved to Tampere, Finland, when Wheeler was six years old.

In 2005, Wheeler moved to Helsinki and started to make music. Her first single, "You'll Be Gone", was released in 2005. The song was used in the film Beauty and the Bastard. Her debut album, Hitchin to Helsinki, was released on 5 November 2008.

From 2007 to 2008, Wheeler hosted Tilt.tv, a Finnish television program about video games.

In January 2009, Wheeler participated in Kuorosota, the Finnish version of Clash of the Choirs. Her choir was eliminated first.

In 2010, Wheeler participated in Fort Boyard Suomi, the Finnish version of Fort Boyard, as part of the Blue team, which won the competition.

In 2013, she announced the Finnish votes in the Eurovision Song Contest 2013, celebrated in Malmö, Sweden.

== Discography ==
=== Albums ===
- Hitchin to Helsinki (2008)
- Sirpaleista koottu (2012)
- Kun katson kauempaa (2015)

=== Singles ===
- "You'll Be Gone" (2005)
- "Sunny Day" (2008)
- "Annie and I" (2008)
- "Rainy Helsinki" (2009)
- "Wrong" (2009)
- "Kiitos kun muistit" (2010)
- "Ihanaa" (2011)
- "Sininen sydän" (2011)
- "Ensimmäinen nainen" (2012)
- "Muukalainen" (2013)
- "Rikki" (2013)

=== Music videos ===
- "Sunny Day" (2008 – directed by Misko Iho)
- "Annie and I" (2008 – directed by Misko Iho)
- "Kiitos kun muistit" (2010 – directed by Jussi Solja, Heikki Häkkinen, Kristiina Wheeler)
- "Ihanaa" (2011 – directed by Cristal Snow)
- "Sininen sydän" (2011 – directed by Cristal Snow)
