= Albion Online =

Medieval fantasy MMORPG video game

- Developer: Sandbox Interactive
- Publisher: Sandbox Interactive
- Designer: Robin Henkys
- Engine: Unity
- Platforms: Microsoft Windows, macOS, Linux, iOS, Android, Xbox Series X/S
- Release: Windows, macOS, Linux: WW: July 17, 2017; iOS, Android: WW: June 9, 2021; Xbox Series X/S: WW: April 21, 2026
- Genre: MMORPG
- Mode: Multiplayer

Albion Online is a free-to-play medieval fantasy MMORPG by Sandbox Interactive, released in 2017.

Set in a medieval world, Albion Online is a medieval fantasy game based on the Arthurian legends, with militaristic strategy aspects to it. The game has been translated into 11 languages and has over 5 million registered users over three servers.

== Gameplay ==
Albion Online's gameplay centers itself around a classless system, in which the equipment a player chooses to wear defines their abilities and the way they can play. Players can go out and do activities in Albion's world in order to gain Fame, which functions similarly to experience in other MMORPGs. Fame is used to level up skills, such as proficiency with a weapon. Achieving a certain proficiency will allow the player to use higher tier of the same weapon class.

Items in Albion Online have eight tiers, ranging from Beginner to Elder. Item Power (IP) of an item increases with the tier. Items can also be enchanted, giving them more IP. Levels of weapon specialization (commonly referred to as "spec"), which is leveled up with Fame, also significantly increases IP.

The game has a large open-world map that players can travel through. Different PVP zones offer different levels of risk and reward, including Yellow, Red, and Black zones; Red and Black zones feature full loot drop upon death.

The game has a fully player driven economy. All equipment and items are made by other players. The game offers both PVE and PVP combat.

Players may join a guild, which are created by other players for a fee. Guilds may consist of up to 300 players and fight over territories, castles, and other objectives. These large-scale battles are called ZvZ, short for Zerg vs. Zerg. Guilds may additionally form an alliance together.

== Development ==
The game was developed and published by Berlin-based studio Sandbox Interactive. During the beta stages of development, players were able to purchase "Founder's Packs" to gain access to the closed beta play-tests which were run intermittently by Sandbox Interactive, typically after an interval of a few months of development. After the release of the game, these founder's packs were made unavailable for purchase. Albion Online removed its free-to-play model for various reasons in December 2015 (which was then made free again at a later date).

When it was initially released on July 17, 2017, Albion Online offered a selection of "Starter Packs" which granted players access to the game and offered a varying amount of gold (in-game currency) to get started. Once a player purchased any of the starter packs, they would be granted open-ended access to the game with no extra mandatory fees. Players could also purchase membership for a limited amount of time without the benefits of the starter packs. By April 2019, Albion Online went free to play. Players can also buy premium with in-game currency (gold & silver).

A second server based in Singapore named "Albion East", later renamed to "Albion Asia", was opened to the public in March 2023.

A new server for the Europe, Middle East and North Africa regions was opened on April 29, 2024.
