= Rampage Puzzle Attack =

2001 video game

- North American box art
- Developer: Ninai Games
- Publisher: Midway
- Designer: Mikko Miettinen
- Series: Rampage
- Platform: Game Boy Advance
- Release: NA: November 19, 2001; EU: December 7, 2001
- Genre: Puzzle
- Modes: Single-player, multiplayer

Rampage Puzzle Attack is a 2001 puzzle video game developed by Finnish studio Ninai Games and published by Midway for the Game Boy Advance. It is a clone of the puzzle game Drop Mania and based on the Rampage characters. At the beginning of the game, the three characters from the original game, George, Lizzie and Ralph, are available, but more characters who appeared in other games of the series can be unlocked through the Rescue mode. The characters appear on screen during the gameplay, climbing the side of the play arena or being caged at the bottom. The game uses password saves to track player progress.

It was the first console game to be developed in Finland.

== Gameplay ==
Gameplay-wise, the game is similar to Ninai's earlier games in the Drop Mania series and Super Puzzle Fighter II Turbo.

The basic idea is that the player drops two colored blocks at a time to the playfield. The blocks then merge into contiguous areas. When the player drops a flashing "detoblock" of matching color to touch the area, the entire area is removed and scored. This can lead to chains and combos, and to higher scores.

The game includes a single- and two-player modes. The following modes are available in single-player:

- Clear mode - Includes various areas that need to be cleared to advance to the next level.
- Puzzle mode - Similar to Clear mode, but there are only a limited number of blocks.
- Rescue mode - A cage is added to the bottom of the playfield, and the idea is to remove the blocks on top before the time runs out.
- Marathon mode - There's no set conditions of win, the game continues until it's impossible to keep going.

Two-player modes include Rescue mode, Score mode (competition for higher score) and Attack mode.

== Reception ==
Reception

Aggregate score
Aggregator	Score
Metacritic	71/100

Review scores
Publication	Score
AllGame	2.5/5
Game Informer	5/10
GamesMaster	80%
GameZone	8.5/10
IGN	8.5/10
Nintendo Power	2.9/5
Nintendo World Report	9/10

The game received "average" reviews according to the review aggregation website Metacritic.
