= Tilt (Finnish TV series) =

Finnish television show

- Genre: Video gaming
- Presented by: Jaana Pelkonen (1997–2005); Anna-Maija Jalkanen (2005–2007); Kristiina Wheeler (2007–2008); Anni Uusivirta (2011–2013); Martina Kuitto (2013–present); Simo Kurki (2013–2016)
- Country of origin: Finland
- Original language: Finnish

Original release
- Network: MTV3; Sub; Jim; Fox; Kutonen

Tilt (previously known as Tilt.tv) is a Finnish video gaming programme aired primarily on MTV3. It started out in 1997 on MTV3 and was also seen on Sub, Jim, Fox and briefly on Nelonen. Currently the programme is aired on Kutonen. Tilt.tv was originally hosted by Jaana Pelkonen, who more recently hosted the Eurovision Song Contest 2007 in Helsinki together with Mikko Leppilampi. After Pelkonen the host was Anna-Maija Jalkanen from 2005 to the spring of 2007 after Jalkanen the host was Kristiina Wheeler from 2007 to 2008, and after Wheeler the host was Anni Uusivirta from 2011 to 2013. The current host is Martina Kuitto. Simo Kurki hosted alongside Kuitto from 2013 to 2015. The show has had continuing success and has been exported to Poland and other countries.

At times the show has gathered mixed feelings amongst gaming fans and there have been grumblings (Tilt.tv has at various times been sponsored by both Sony, Nintendo and Electronic Arts; and having hosts that generally have no gaming background. On the other hand the current host Wheeler has been working in game retail, in addition to being a musician. Tilt.tv regardless remains Finland's only steadily running gaming show, especially after the collapse of MoonTV. Tilt.tv has been running continuously for over 20 years, which sets it to compete for the title of the longest running gaming TV show in the world.

The magazine Tilt-lehti also had a brief run. It was aimed for a more mature audience than the TV program, but in the end it did not manage to find its core audience. The magazine was cancelled after one year, after failing to compete with bigger and better known Finnish gaming magazines such as Pelit and Pelaaja. Tilt.tv website provides a review archive, streaming version of the TV program episodes dating back several years, browser games, forum, blogs and a real-time chat.
