= Playmation =

2015 Toys-to-life video game from Disney

- Playmation Logo
- Type: Smart toy
- Company: Disney
- Country: United States

Playmation is a system of toys, wearables, and companion apps from Disney and Hasbro. The system is designed to keep kids active, replacing screens with pretend play. Players can receive missions through a companion app, and track scores and accomplishments.

The toy system launched in October 2015 with the Marvel Avengers collection. Star Wars and Frozen were planned for 2016 and 2017.

It is reported that much of the development team has been laid-off and that while the existing Avengers product line would continue to be sold through Christmas 2016 any further development was on hold. The Marvel app and Marvel toy line was discontinued on March 28th, 2019

== See also ==
- Toys-to-life
