= Oliver Kohlenberg =

German composer (born 1957)

Oliver Kohlenberg (born 24 January 1957) is a German composer.

== Life ==
Born in Aachen, he is noted for his work in Finland. He studied in Cologne with Hermann Schroeder. He studied in Hamburg with Diethe de la Motte, and György Ligeti. He studied in Freiburg with Klaus Huber. He has taught since 1981 in the Kainuu Music Institute, and the Oulu Conservatory. In 2002, he moved to live and teach at the Lahti University of Applied Sciences.

In 1997 he received the Oulu City Prize.

== Works ==
Kohlenberg's works include four symphonies, several operas, concertos, chamber music and plenty of solo instrumental works, as well as vocal music. His style is based on expressive solutions and thick sound fields and often requires extensive performers.
