= Insaniquarium =

2001 puzzle video game

- Developer: Flying Bear Entertainment
- Publishers: PopCap Games; MumboJumbo
- Designer: George Fan
- Programmers: George Fan; Brian Rothstein; Thien Tran
- Artists: John Langley; Walter Wilson (Note: Though Tysen Henderson did develop the backgrounds in the Java version of Insaniquarium, he is not credited as an artist, instead being part of the Special Thanks list.)
- Composers: George Fan; Jonne Valtonen
- Platforms: Microsoft Windows; Mobile phone; Palm OS; Windows Mobile; PDA
- Release: August 31, 2001: Java; WW: August 31, 2001 PDA; WW: April 2004 PC; WW: 2004 (Note: The manual states Insaniquarium Deluxe was released on September 1, 2004. However, the official website for Flying Bear Entertainment states that it was released for Microsoft Windows on August 30, 2004, and for Mac OS X on October 16, 2004.) Mobile phone; NA: April 13, 2006; EU: June 29, 2006 Palm OS, Windows Mobile; WW: August 6, 2008
- Genres: Puzzle, virtual pets
- Mode: Single-player

Insaniquarium is a 2001 virtual pets simulator video game, developed by Flying Bear Entertainment and published by PopCap Games and MumboJumbo. Before PopCap Games's involvement, the game was a web-based Java game released in 2001. The game was made downloadable by PopCap Games in 2004 and was ported to mobile devices in 2006 and 2008 by Glu Mobile and Astraware respectively. Insaniquarium has the player maintain a tank full of fish while protecting it from alien attacks.

Insaniquarium was mainly designed and programmed by George Fan through his company Flying Bear Entertainment. His main intention was to have the game featured in the Independent Games Festival. After learning the game had made it as a finalist, Fan paired up with PopCap Games to make the game downloadable. The game was a success, garnering general praise for its fast-paced gameplay, and was downloaded 20 million times as of April 2006.

== Gameplay ==
Screenshot of gameplay from Insaniquarium

Insaniquarium is a virtual pets simulator with a blend of elements from action, strategy, and puzzle video games. In the game, the player must manage a tank of guppies and other aquatic creatures, and each stage begins with two guppies in the tank. Guppies and other fish drop coins, which can be collected by the player and used to purchase fish food and upgrades, such as more aquatic creatures, food that can keep the fish full for a longer period of time, and laser upgrades to repel attackers. The coins will disappear if they reach the bottom of the tank. Each creature must be kept alive by feeding. The method of feeding depends on the type of fish to be fed. For example, guppies eat fish food bought by the player, and carnivores eat little guppies. In addition to feeding the fish, the player must protect them from aliens that periodically enter the tank and attempt to eat them. The aliens must be clicked on repeatedly with the mouse pointer in order to defeat them. If there are no fishes (or pets in Tank 5) in the tank by any means (except if Amp electrocutes the guppies, all guppies were turned into Nostradamus (both of which as long as there are no other fish types present in the tank), and all of the fish had died of hunger in Tank 1-1 for the first time), the player has to restart the level (Adventure) or mode (Challenge). For time trial if getting a game over, they will revert back to the main menu but will not obtain rewards from gameplay forcing them to let the time out first to convert cash into shells.

Insaniquarium can be played in four modes: Adventure, Time Trial, Challenge, or Virtual Tank. In Adventure mode, a player advances through four tanks, each with five levels. In each level, the player must earn enough money to buy three egg pieces to advance to the next level. During an initial playthrough of Adventure mode, at the end of each level of a tank, the player receives a new pet from the egg. While 24 pets can be earned throughout Adventure mode, each level requires the player to pick three pets. Each pet can aid the player during gameplay. There are bonus rounds where the player can collect shells, which can be spent to place fish in the Virtual Tank.

After a tank is completed in Adventure mode, it will be unlocked in Time Trial mode. Time Trial mode restricts the player to completing the first tank in five minutes and in ten minutes for the three subsequent tanks. The purpose of each level is to collect as much money before the time runs out. Challenge mode is unlocked after Adventure mode is completed, and there are four levels that are unlocked in subsequent order. The player has to fight increasingly difficult waves of aliens while taking care of the fishes and unlocking the pieces to the egg. Both modes award the player with shells. The Virtual Tank is the player's personal aquarium where their fish are maintained. The tank can be used as a screensaver.

== Development ==
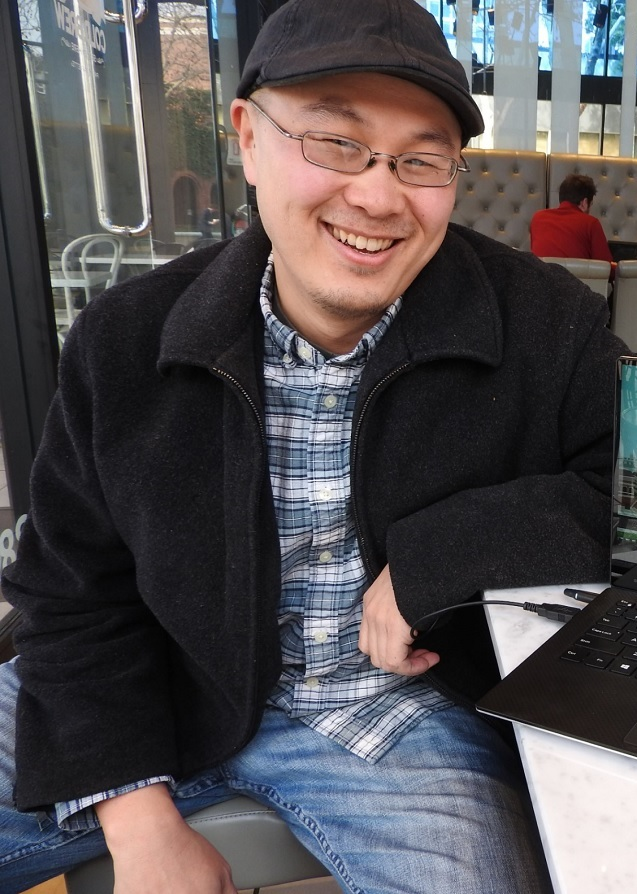
George Fan (pictured in 2018) is the creator, designer, and programmer of Insaniquarium.

During his time working for the online gaming portal Prizegames.com, George Fan was researching Java games. He came across the website for PopCap Games and found their games better than the other Java games he was researching. Afterwards, Fan left Prizegames.com and became a freelance video game designer. Fan started developing Insaniquarium, back then codenamed FishTank, using Java in July 2001. He paired up with his colleague, an artist named Tysen Henderson, for him to create the backgrounds. They formed Flying Bear Entertainment together to develop the game.

Fan's main purpose with creating Insaniquarium was to develop a video game to enter into the Independent Games Festival, having decided to do so along with Henderson after seeing the independent games in the Game Developers Conference 2001 (GDC 2001). Fan's idea "was to create a game that's easy to get into, yet unfolds into something much deeper." The first prototype simply featured clicking on the fish to feed them when necessary. Fan decided to add more depth to Insaniquarium due to his inspiration from an unknown Java game, which let the player buy upgrades with accumulated resources. He entered Insaniquarium into the festival in 2002. The prototype submitted took a month to create.

Fan was in a cyber cafe in Hawaii when he heard that Insaniquarium made it into the festival as a finalist, to which he openly screamed with joy. Insaniquarium later won the festival's category "Innovation in Game Design". Fan contacted PopCap Games and asked if they would be at GDC 2002. They met up at Fan's finalist booth at the conference. PopCap offered Fan aid in publishing Insaniquarium as a downloadable game, though didn't hire him, as Fan was already offered a job at Blizzard Entertainment. Blizzard allowed Fan to develop Insaniquarium before working with them, and PopCap Games aided Fan on Insaniquarium for the next two years. Following the start of PopCap Games's aid, Insaniquarium used the PopCap Games Framework as its engine. Fan designed and programmed a majority of the game along with drawing its concept art and composing some of the music.

== Release ==
Flying Bear Entertainment first released Insaniquarium as a free, Java-based online game on their website on August 31, 2001. The game received updates over the next year. Following GDC 2002, PopCap Games became the publisher for Insaniquarium. The second version was released on PopCap Games's official website on July 29, 2002. The paid downloadable version, known as Insaniquarium Deluxe, was released in 2004.

Earlier in 2004 around April, Insaniquarium was released to personal digital assistants (PDAs). Glu Mobile announced in December 2005 that Insaniquarium was being ported to mobile phones. They released Insaniquarium for the mobile platform on April 13, 2006, in the United States, and on June 29, 2006, in Europe. Astraware later released the game on Palm OS smartphones and Windows Mobile phones on August 6, 2008.

== Reception ==
Reception

Review scores
Publication	Score
GameSpot	6.9/10
Gamezebo	4.5/5
IGN	Mobile: 8.3/10
PCMag	PDA: 5/5
Pocket Gamer	Mobile: 3.5/5

Insaniquarium was a success. IGN reported in December 2005 that Insaniquarium Deluxe reached over 18 million downloads on the PC. In April 2006, Pocket Gamer reported 20 million downloads.

Insaniquarium also received positive appraisal. Jay Bibby of Jay is Games called Insaniquarium "cute, strange and addictive". PCMag's Carol Mangnis stated that Insaniquarium "takes the joy and anxiety of maintaining an aquarium and turns [it] into a supercharged Tamagotchi-like experience." Retrospectively, Jordan Devore from Destructoid felt that Insaniquarium had aged well. Jody Macgregor of PC Gamer listed Insaniquarium on his list of best underwater games. He said, "Insaniquarium takes the inane pleasantness of owning a fish tank and video gamifies the hell out of it."

The fast-paced gameplay was praised by many critics. Steve Palley of GameSpot said that Insaniquarium is "a fast-clicking experience that's several orders of magnitude crazier than your typical real-life aquarium." GameDaily's Samantha Rupert recommended Insaniquarium, having written that the game never gets boring due to how it changes every five levels. Stuart Dredge from Pocket Gamer noted how Insaniquarium constantly introduced new resources to keep the game interesting, though, in contrast to Rupert, Dredge said that players would tire of the game faster than they would hope. Dieter Bohn of Windows Central recommended playing the game for "something to pass the time with or just need[ing] a little pick-me-up after a long day at work."

The game's visuals were also praised by some critics. IGN's Levi Buchanan said that every tank was "almost fiercely colorful", and that the guppies and the ultravores evoke different emotions. Joel Brodie of Gamezebo praised the graphics and the amount of personality that each character had. Bohn found the graphics to be "nice" and the user interface simple.
