= Assembly (demoparty) =

Finnish demoscene and gaming event

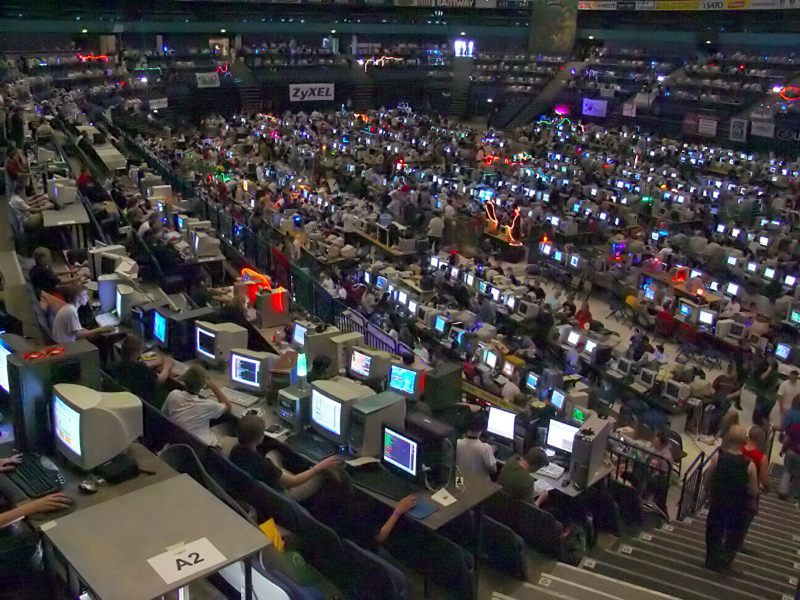
The Assembly demoparty 2004 in Helsinki Halli

The Assembly demoparty is an annual demoscene and gaming event in Finland. It is the biggest demoscene party in the world and the biggest computer event in Finland. The Summer event takes place every year at Messukeskus in Helsinki, between late July and early August, and lasts three to four days. The 2020 edition was held online.

Assembly Winter was announced in early 2007. The winter party is held in January or February and is a more gaming-oriented LAN party–type event, whereas the summer events continues the traditions of the original demoparty under the name Assembly Summer.

== History ==
The first Assembly was held from July 24 to July 26, 1992, in Kauniainen. It was organized by the Amiga demo groups Complex and Rebels, and the PC demo group Future Crew. The staff grew into a large non-profit group of individuals known as Assembly Organizing. Through the 1990s, Assembly grew so large that even exposition halls no longer sufficed, and only the largest of sports arenas met the partygoers' needs. In 1999, they rented the largest sports arena in the country, Helsinki Halli (formerly Hartwall Arena) in Helsinki, with over 5000 visitors and 3500 computers on the ice rink.

The 2004 edition of the party also set a record: in July 2004, QuakeCon announced it was holding the world's first Doom 3 competitions at the event starting on August 12–14, roughly a week after the game's release on August 3. Assembly, however, managed to hold the first Doom 3 competitions after acquiring copies of the game via FedEx with the help of some contacts in the United States and holding the competition during August 5–8.

Since 2014, the event has moved to Messukeskus Expo Centre. In 2022, the party celebrated 30 years of continuous operation. The main organizers of the event are Pekka Aakko (Pehu of Accession) and Jussi Laakkonen (Abyss of Future Crew).

== Boozembly ==
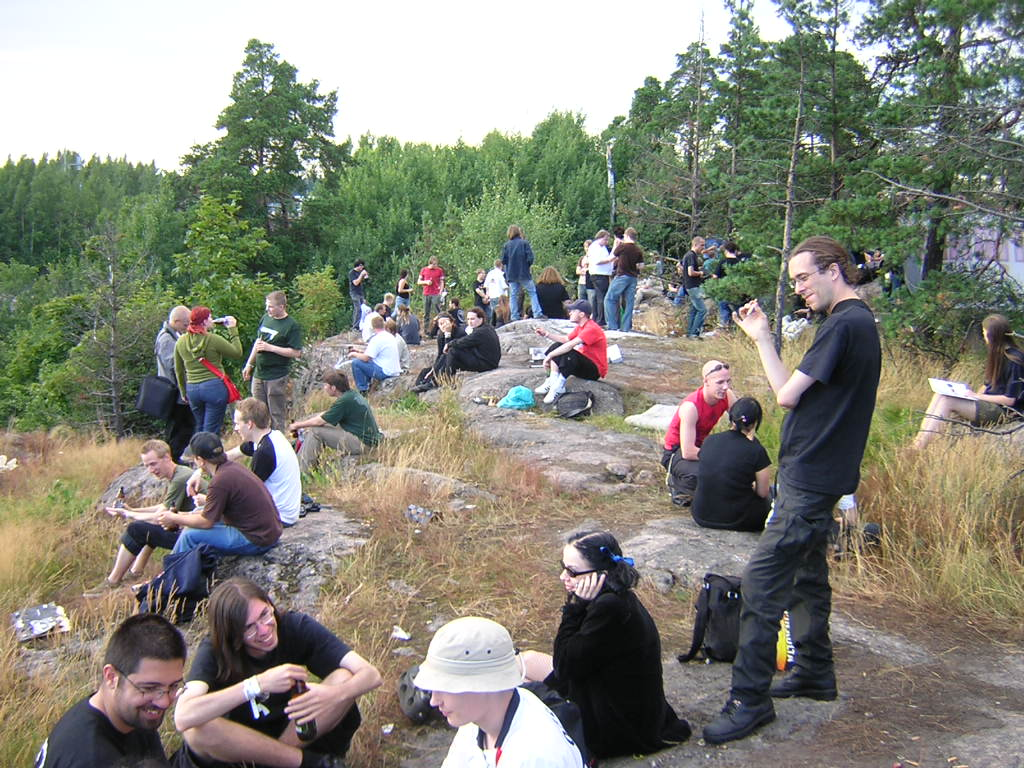
Boozembly 2005

Since 1995, an event called Boozembly has been organized in a nearby forest. It is officially unrelated to Assembly but serves as a meeting point for Assembly attendees as well as for other computer hobbyists and their friends. In Boozembly it is possible to use intoxicants which is not allowed in Assembly. Later IT corporations started to sponsor free beer for Boozembly. Like Assembly, Boozembly itself has become an important part of Finnish demoscene culture.

== Competitions ==
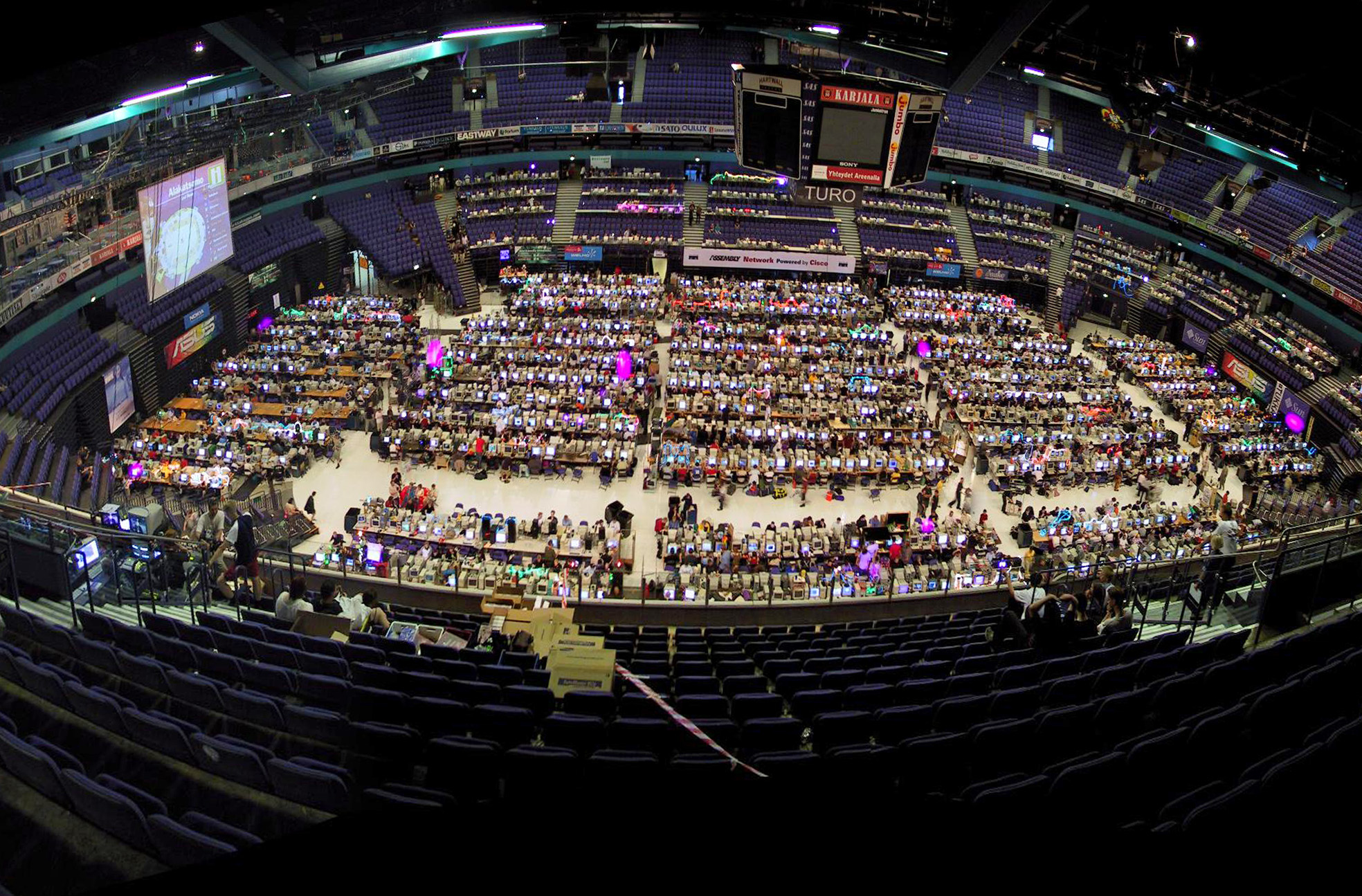
Panorama view over the Assembly 2002 event

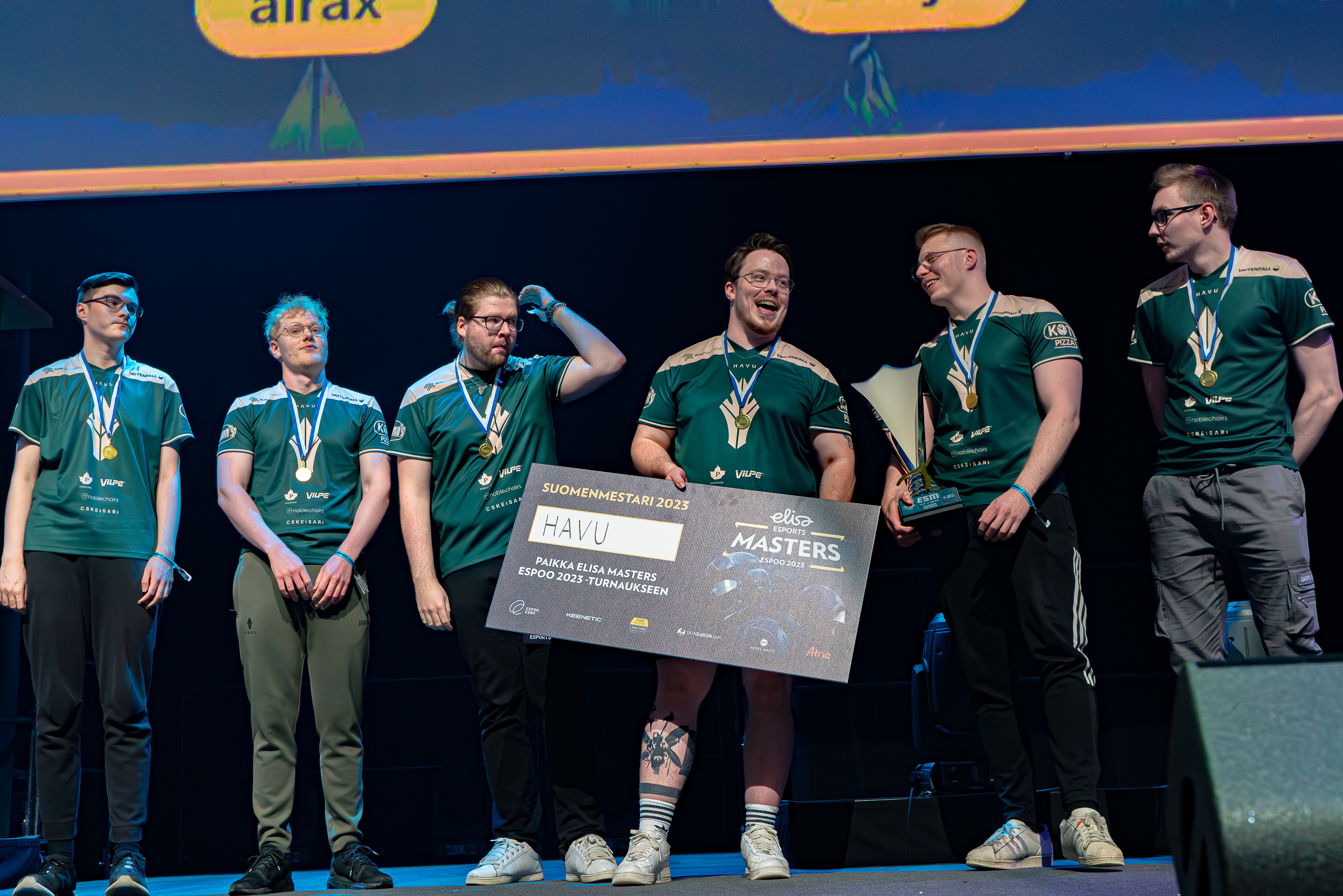
Esports and gaming results at Assembly Summer 2023

The party includes multiple competitions, or compos including but not limited to:

- Demo (created in 2000 by combining Amiga and PC category)
- Oldskool demo (must be able to run on a game console up to 5th-generation or PC with similar specification)
- 64k intro (discontinued after 2011; reintroduced in 2017–2020)
- 4k intro
- 1k intro
- Dance music
- Listening music
- Fast Music
- Fast graphics
- Short film
- Real Wild demo
- Photo
- Video game developing compo

For the first eight years of Assembly, the demo and intro competitions were split into separate IBM PC compatible and Amiga categories. Starting in 2000, the platforms have been combined, with PC (Windows or Linux), Amiga, Mac and even high-end consoles competing in the same demo and intro competitions. Similarly, Commodore 64 competitions were replaced with "oldskool" competitions that also allow entries for some other old platforms, such as various 8-bit systems and older Amigas.

Entries are submitted by demogroups and individual artists and are rated by judges. All demos which are deemed to be of a high-enough standard are then shown on a big screen. Entries which break the competition rules (e.g. use copyrighted material, or aren't suitable for the category to which they are entered) are disqualified. People who are present at the arena vote for the entries, and the results are published on the Assembly website. The entries are usually made available by the artists at scene.org or on the artists own website.

Assembly's demo competitions generally hold a very high level, especially for a party that is not specific to the demoscene. Notable winners include Lifeforce by ASD, Panic Room by Fairlight and Frameranger by Fairlight, CNCD and Orange.

Janne "Tempest" Suni—who is a Finnish demoscener, pixel artist, tracker musician, and a member of the demogroup Fairlight—is best known for his song "Acidjazzed Evening". "Acidjazzed Evening" originally won the oldskool music competition at the 2000 Assembly demoparty. Suni and his award-winning song came to mainstream prominence after the melody was unlawfully co-opted by hip-hop producer Timbaland in the 2006 song "Do It" by Nelly Furtado. During Assembly demoparty 2013 an electronic music concert was performed on stage by Sabastian Teir alias „Kebu”.

=== Demo and intro competition winners ===
Assembly demo/intro compo winners
Year	Amiga demo	PC demo	C64 demo	Amiga intro	PC 64K intro
1992	Sound Vision (Reflect)	Unreal (Future Crew)	Gunnar 2 (Dual Crew)	Repo (Vectra)	N/A
1993	Extension (Pygmy Projects)	Second Reality (Future Crew)	Four years (Origo Dreamline)	Bananamen (Stellar)	Eclipse (EMF)
1994	Mindflow (Stellar)	Verses (EMF)	Attack of Stubidos 3 (Beyond Force)	G-Force (Pygmy Projects)	Airframe (Prime)
1995	ZIF (Parallax)	Stars (NoooN)	Extremes (Byterapers)	Fad (Sonik Clique)	Drift (Wild Light)
1996	Sumea (Virtual Dreams)	Machines of Madness (Dubius)	Follow the Sign 3 (Byterapers)	Pure (Sonik Clique)	Blind (Eufrosyne)
1997	Pulse (Nerve Axis)	Boost (Doomsday)	Speedway (Panic)	911 (Limbo)	Mainstream (Moottori)
1998	Relic (Nerve Axis)	Gateways (Trauma)	Speedway 2 (Panic)	Edit 0.5 (Haujobb)	Oxygen (Coral)
1999	Beats (Loveboat)	Non-3D:Gasoline (Recreation)	Speedway 3 (Panic)	älä ota sitä vakavasti (Da Jormas)	Viagra (Mewlers)
1999	Beats (Loveboat)	3D:Virhe (Maturefurk)	Speedway 3 (Panic)	älä ota sitä vakavasti (Da Jormas)	Viagra (Mewlers)
Year	Combined demo		Oldskool demo	Combined 64K intro	
2000	Spot (Exceed)		Oldskool Trippin (Haujobb)	Dead Flowers (Haujobb)	
2001	Lapsuus (Maturefurk)		Riyadh (Bandwagon)	Sonnet (Threestate)	
2002	Liquid... Wen? (Haujobb)		Impossiblator 2 (PWP)	Squish (AND)	
2003	Legomania (Doomsday)		Robotic Liberation (PWP)	Zoom 3 (AND)	
2004	Obsoleet (Unreal Voodoo)		Halfway There (Dekadence)	The Prophecy — Project Nemesis (Conspiracy)	
2005	Iconoclast (ASD)		Boogie Factor (Fairlight)	Che Guevara (Fairlight)	
2006	Starstruck (The Black Lotus)		Fruitcake (RNO)	Dead Ringer (Fairlight)	
2007	Lifeforce (ASD)		High Hopes (Aspekt)	Basic Facts About Design (Immersion)	
2008	Within Epsilon (Pyrotech)		Renaissance (Byterapers)	Panic Room (Fairlight)	
2009	Frameranger (Fairlight, CNCD, & Orange)		3½ Inches Is Enough (Unreal Voodoo)	Transform (Ate Bit)	
2010	Happiness is around the bend (ASD)		Grind (Dekadence & Accession)	x marks the spot, Function-X invitation (Portal Process)	
2011	Spin (ASD)		Chaotic (Dekadence)	Cancelled due to lack of entries	
Year	Combined demo		Oldskool demo	Combined 4k Intro	Combined 1k Intro
2012	Spacecut (CNCD)		Conservative Megademo (PWP)	Fireflies (Blobtrox)	Embers (TDA)
2013	return (Pyrotech)		Norwegian Pillow (Dekadence)	Highway 4k (HBC)	Tendrils (Traction + Fit)
2014	Black And White Lies (One Studio Off)		Sliced & Diced (Dekadence)	Splash (Unknown Artists)	Superstructure (TDA)
2015	Monolith (ASD)		Carbon Based (Dekadence)	Hydrokinetics (Prismbeings)	BLCK4777 (p01 / ribbon)
2016	Gestalt (Quite vs T-Rex)		Malf*cktion (Byterapers)	Outcast (Unknown Artists)	Escape through subspace 1K (Seven/Fulcrum)
Year	Demo	Oldskool demo	64k Intro	4k Intro	1k Intro
2017	Zoomin (Adapt)	My Summer Demo (Byterapers)	Down the Drain (Ivory Labs)	Primordial Soup (Faemiyah)	VOLTRA (Ribbon)
2018	Number One/Another One (CNCD & Fairlight)	Shattered Minds (Byterapers)	Out of the Box (Adapt)	Core Critical (HBC)	geelimanipulaatio (gib3, tix0)
2019	Chroma Space (Adapt)	PYO PYO (Rustbloom)	1989 by Graphics & Direction : Metoikos / Music : Keen / Toolcode : BoyC & Gargaj	Stormriders (Unknown Artists & XZM)	Searching for the silver lining (Seven)
Year	Demo		Oldskool demo	4k Intro	1k Intro
2020	ember dream (Adapt)		Fantomas (Siesta)	VIRGO 1302 (HBC)	MONOSPACE (RIBBON)
Winter 2021	Argon (Wide Load)		N/A	N/A	N/A
2022 (30 years anniversary)	Shine 'n Flow (Adapt)		Porridgy (hedelmae)	Thir(s)ty (First) (oo)	Vivid pixels (Digimind)
2023	The Legend of Sisyphus (Andromeda Software Development)		The Scroll of Antonius (Fairlight)	monoscan (McBurrobit)	EXPI (p01 / ribbon + pestis / brainlez Coders!)
2024	The Message (Gray Marchers)		Transcend the Game (PWP)	Olkiluoto 3-2-1 (Faemiyah)	Building from bedrock 1K (Fulcrum)
2025	Wunderlust (Gray Marchers)		Demoded (7dump & SandS)	Technomancer (Epoqe)	Bones of Civilisation (Fulcrum)

== AssemblyTV ==
In recent years, Assembly has broadcast content from its in-house media effort AssemblyTV to local and national TV networks, as well as producing web streams for people to watch live over the internet — spots for hundreds, if not thousands of viewers are catered for, and these streams have been watched all over the world, not just in Finland. In addition to the opening and closing ceremonies, the competitions and party reports, the educational sessions that are being held during the party are broadcast via AssemblyTV.

== ARTtech seminars ==
ARTtech seminars are free-to-attend educational seminar sessions that are being held during the party at the venue location. The sessions cover various subjects that are usually related to the main party theme and idea, including sessions about programming (coding), graphic design, music composition, game development, hardware hacks, scene history and more.
