= Stewart Kosoy =

- Born: Stewart E. Kosoy; 1950
- Died: October 4, 2015 (aged 65)
- Occupations: Entrepreneur, game financier, & publisher
- Years active: 1985–2015
- Notable work: Unreal, Star Trek: The Next Generation: Echoes from the Past, Duke Nukem 3D

Stewart E. Kosoy (1950 – October 4, 2015) was a pioneer in the video game business who worked in almost every capacity, from making animation to being a designer, producer, developer, agent, and most recently, publisher and financier. After holding a number of high-profile positions for some of the biggest game makers in the industry, he retired as an agent and senior partner of the Interactive Studio Management (ISM) Agency to co-found Digital Capital Corporation. He died in October 2015.

== Career ==
Kosoy got a job doing design consulting for NovaLogic on the game Wolfpack. He was employed by Taito as a producer. He joined Sega of America where he became Manager of Developer Relations. In 1991, while working for Sega, Kosoy produced Clutch Hitter, followed in 1992 by Disney's Ariel the Little Mermaid, Captain Planet and the Planeteers, and Toxic Crusaders. In 1993, he produced Dinosaurs for Hire and The Amazing Spider-Man vs. The Kingpin. The 1994 production of Star Trek: The Next Generation: Echoes from the Past completed his tenure at Sega.

Kosoy held the position of executive producer at Novalogic and established the company's UK office. Kosoy returned to California and became director of development for Warner Music Group. As vice president of product development at GT Interactive, during that time classic titles such as Doom II, Duke Nukem, Quake, and Unreal were published.

He left GT to become an executive producer for MGM Interactive, where he was the executive producer on Tiny Tank: Up Your Arsenal.

In 2002, Kosoy became an agent, where he began to find and represent talented development studios, eventually becoming a senior partner at ISM. One of his most noteworthy projects was putting together the Digital Illusions Creative Entertainment (DICE) - Electronic Arts (EA) deal for Battlefield 1942, which eventually led to the acquisition of DICE by EA for $24.5 million. At ISM he represented clients working on such titles as Die Hard Trilogy 2: Viva Las Vegas and Call of Duty 4: Modern Warfare until he retired in December 2011, relinquishing his senior partnership.

In 2012, Kosoy and Todd Tribell co-founded Digital Capital Corporation (DCC). The company raises financing for game developers by acting as a matchmaker between investors and developers. At DCC, Kosoy takes a primary role in choosing projects to receive private equity placement.

=== Selected games ===
Year	Game	Role	Developer	Publisher
1990	Wolfpack	Designer	NovaLogic	Broderbund
1991	Clutch Hitter	Producer	Sega of America	Sega of America
1992	Toxic Crusaders	Producer	Sega of America	Sega of America
1992	Ariel the Little Mermaid	Producer	Sega of America	Sega of America
1992	Captain Planet and the Planeteers	Producer	Sega of America	Sega of America
1993	Dinosaurs for Hire	Producer	Sega of America	Sega of America
1993	The Amazing Spider-Man vs. The Kingpin	Producer	Sega of America	Sega of America
1994	Streets of Rage 3	Business Developer	Sega of America	Sega of America
1994	Star Trek: The Next Generation: Echoes from the Past	Producer	Sega of America	Sega of America
1995	Comanche 2	Designer	NovaLogic	NovaLogic
1996	9: The Last Resort	VP of Product Development	Tribeca Interactive	GT Interactive
1997	Duke Nukem 3D	VP of Product Development	3D Realms	GT Interactive
1999	Tiny Tank: Up Your Arsenal	Executive Producer	Appaloosa Interactive	Sony Computer Entertainment
2000	Bass Masters 2000	Agent	Mass Media	THQ
2000	Ms. Pac-Man Maze Madness	Agent	Mass Media	Namco
2000	Die Hard Trilogy 2: Viva Las Vegas	Agent	Mass Media	Fox Interactive
2001	Pac-Man Collection	Agent	Mass Media	Namco
2001	Namco Museum	Agent	Mass Media	Namco
2003	Will Rock	Agent	Saber Interactive	Ubisoft
2003	Muppets Party Cruise	Agent	Mass Media	TDK Mediactive
2005	Full Spectrum Warrior	Agent	Mass Media	THQ
2006	Full Spectrum Warrior: Ten Hammers	Agent	Mass Media	THQ
2007	Call of Duty 4: Modern Warfare	Agent	n-Space	Activision
2008	Star Wars: The Force Unleashed	Agent	n-Space	LucasArts
2009	Marvel: Ultimate Alliance 2	Agent	n-Space	Activision
2009	Call of Duty: Modern Warfare: Mobilized	Agent	n-Space	Activision
