= Ed Annunziata =

Video game developer

Edward Ettore Annunziata is a video game designer and producer best known for the Ecco the Dolphin series, Kolibri for the Sega 32X and as the voice of "Greg" in the Sega Saturn game Three Dirty Dwarves.

Annunziata joined Sega in the early 1990s, where he was the lead designer on Ecco the Dolphin (1993). The game departed from typical Genesis games by featuring a sentient dolphin protagonist on a quest to reunite with his pod after an alien abduction.

Later he served as an executive producer for Nokia's N-Gage mobile phone and gaming device, helping create nearly a dozen multiplayer titles for the platform. One of them, Smallball Baseball, was one of the first microtransactions-based games targeting the US market. In 2006, he founded Twofish, Inc. (now part of Live Gamer) with Lee Crawford and Sean Ryan.

== Games ==
- Pyramid Run (1984, Atari 8-bit)
- Spider-Man (1990, Sega Genesis)
- Chakan: The Forever Man (1992, Sega Genesis)
- Dungeons & Dragons: Warriors of the Eternal Sun (1992, Sega Genesis)
- Ecco the Dolphin (1992, Sega Genesis)
- Cyborg Justice (1993, Sega Genesis) *special thanks
- X-Men (1993, Sega Genesis)
- Jurassic Park (1993, Sega CD) *special thanks
- Ecco: The Tides of Time (1994, Sega Genesis)
- X-Men 2: Clone Wars (1995, Sega Genesis)
- Ecco Jr. (1995, Sega Genesis)
- Vectorman (1995, Sega Genesis) *special thanks
- The Adventures of Batman and Robin (1995, Sega Game Gear) *special thanks
- Kolibri (1995, Sega 32X)
- Mr. Bones (1996, Sega Saturn)
- Three Dirty Dwarves (1996, Sega Saturn)
- Tiny Tank: Up Your Arsenal (1999, PlayStation)
- Mort the Chicken (2000, PlayStation)
- SmallBall Baseball (2000)
- SEGA Smashpack (2002, Game Boy Advance) *Ecco the Dolphin re-release
- SNAP Mobile Soccer (2005)
- Slice HD (2011, TwitchGame, LLC)
- Space War Arena (2019, Switch)
- Pizza Tower (2023, Windows, Switch) *gave permission to use Mort the Chicken
