= Spencer Nilsen =

American video game music composer (born 1961)

- Born: April 9, 1961 (age 65)
- Occupations: Singer/songwriter; Video Game Music Composer; Film Composer; Film Producer; Graphic Designer; Educator
- Children: 2
- Website: https://www.spencernilsen.com/

Spencer Nilsen (born April 9, 1961) is an American singer/songwriter, video game music composer, film composer and producer, graphic designer, and educator. He is best known for his soundtracks to the Sega CD versions of Batman Returns, Ecco the Dolphin, Ecco: The Tides of Time, Jurassic Park, The Adventures of Batman & Robin and The Amazing Spider-Man vs. The Kingpin as well as the North American version of Sonic CD. His latest work is Here and Gone an album of 10 original songs produced and engineered by Spyder James. Nilsen sang and played all the instruments on the record, with the exception of acoustic and electric guitars performed by Daniel Reiter.

Nilsen has also worked on a number of film and television scores and released a new-age album titled Architects of Change in 1989.

He is the former president of the now-defunct Ex'pression College for Digital Arts in Emeryville, California, and co-chairman of the board of Music in Schools Today. He was also the owner and co-founder of Illumina Studios, a full-service media design and production company. Spencer currently teaches and mentors students at Sonoma Academy college prep high school in Santa Rosa, CA.

== Works ==
=== Video games ===
Title	Year	System(s)	Notes
Chakan	1992	Sega Genesis	Special thanks
Ecco the Dolphin	1992	Sega Genesis	with Brian Coburn and András Magyari. Wrote new soundtrack for Sega CD version.
Greatest Heavyweights	1993	Sega Genesis	Special thanks
Batman Returns	1993	Sega CD	
Sonic CD	1993	Sega CD	American version, with David Young and Sterling
Jurassic Park	1993	Sega CD	with Barry Blum, Coburn, David Javelosa and Tom Miley
The Amazing Spider-Man vs. The Kingpin	1993	Sega CD	with Young and Eric Martin
Joe Montana's NFL Football	1993	Sega CD	with Coburn
Ecco: The Tides of Time	1994	Sega CD	
The Adventures of Batman & Robin	1995	Sega CD	Animation score.
Wild Woody	1995	Sega CD	Music engineering, mixing and mastering
Cyber Speedway	1995	Sega Saturn	Producer; special thanks
World Series Baseball	1995	Sega Saturn	Special thanks
Ghen War	1995	Sega Saturn	Producer
Congo The Movie: The Lost City of Zinj	1996	Sega Saturn	Executive music producer
Mr. Bones	1996	Sega Saturn	Played organ
Ecco the Dolphin: Defender of the Future	2000	Dreamcast, PS2	Music producer
Super Smash Bros. Brawl	2008	Wii	Original game supervisor
Sonic Forces	2017	Xbox One, PS4, Switch, PC	Writer of "Metal Sonic Fight"

=== Other work ===
Year	Album titles	Notes
1989	Architects of Change	
1990	Checkfield - A View From the Edge	Assistant engineer
1992	Party - Music That Cooks	With various others
1994	Absolutely Rose Street	Short film
1994	Sonic the Hedgehog Boom	With various others
1995	Party 2 - Music That Cooks	With various others
1995	Sega Music Group - 1995 Sampler	With various others
1996	Sega PowerCuts 1	With various others
1996	Ecco: Songs of Time	
2003	No Return	
2009	Moonlight Sonata	Music and title designer
2012	99%	Short film
2019	DNA	Short film
2022	Here and Gone	
