= Ecco II: Sentinels of the Universe =

- Developer: Appaloosa Interactive
- Publisher: Sega
- Platform: Sega Dreamcast
- Release: Cancelled
- Genre: Action-adventure
- Mode: Single-player

Ecco II: Sentinels of the Universe was a planned entry in the Ecco the Dolphin series of video games. The game was developed as a follow-up to Ecco the Dolphin: Defender of the Future (2000) on the Sega Dreamcast, but was cancelled upon the discontinuation of the Dreamcast platform in 2001. Content and prototype builds from development have slowly been made public in subsequent years.

== Development ==
The game was never officially announced by developer Appaloosa Interactive or publisher Sega during its development; rather, info was found out retroactively through commentary from development team members and video game preservationists. The game's existence first became publicly known in 2007, when an early prototype was discovered on a Sega Dreamcast development kit. Video game preservationist group Hidden Palace later obtained and released a copy of the prototype in 2016, leading to an influx of new information on the game. The game had been in development for the Sega Dreamcast in 2001, with the build of the prototype dating back to February 2001, a month prior to the Dreamcast's discontinuation. The game was developed as a sequel to Ecco the Dolphin: Defender of the Future, the Ecco game developed by Appaloosa a year prior. The game was only in-development for relatively brief time, and was estimated to be only 30% complete at the time of cancellation. The game was cancelled when Sega ended the production of the Dreamcast in favor of becoming a third party video game developer and publisher, though, unlike many games published at the end of the Dreamcast's lifespan, it was never released on the competing PlayStation 2, GameCube, or original Xbox platforms.

Between 2019 and 2022, game preservationist Comby Laurent was able to get further content released as well, including working with Appaloosa Interactive graphic designer Mihály Sáránszki to upload footage, and get content from a level editor from another Appaloosa developer as well. Images from the level editor showed new content beyond what was available in the prototype.

== Gameplay ==
The game's prototype features gameplay similar to Ecco the Dolphin: Defender of the Future. The game's levels are fully playable, with an active debug code allowing for the player to select from a list of levels, and then freely direct Ecco the Dolphin to swim through said water-based levels. While the environments are completely open for exploration, they feature few objectives to accomplish outside of hoops to swim through and a few non-player characters to interact with. The game is also very evidently a work in progress; it features no music or sound, many glitches, and various debug info, such as data values and frame rate counters, cannot be removed from the screen.

== Reception ==
Hardcore Gamer praised the game's graphics as strong considering the early state of the prototypes of the game, noting that "It's amazing how crisp the texture work is – Ecco's character model looks fantastic even today, and the animations are impressive and silky-smooth." Multiple publications both rejoiced and lamented that the game was the only way to experience new content from an otherwise dormant franchise.
