= William Tribell =

William Tribell may refer to:

- William S. Tribell (born 1977), American poet
- William Todd Tribell (born 1968), American businessman
