= Ecco: The Tides of Time =

1994 video game

- Box art by Boris Vallejo
- Developer: Novotrade International
- Publisher: Sega
- Director: László Szenttornyai
- Producer: Ed Annunziata
- Designers: Ed Annunziata; László Szenttornyai
- Artist: Zsolt Balogh
- Composers: Genesis: Attila Dobos; András Magyari; Andy Armer; Sega CD: Spencer Nilsen; David Young; Game Gear: Csaba Gigor; Gábor Foltán; László Fazekas
- Series: Ecco the Dolphin
- Platforms: Sega Genesis, Sega CD, Game Gear, Master System
- Release: Sega Genesis/Mega Drive: JP: August 26, 1994; NA: November 1994; EU: November 18, 1994; Game Gear: NA: November 1994; EU: November 1994; Sega CD: NA: November 1994; AU: April 1995; EU: June 1995; Master System: BRA: 1996
- Genre: Action-adventure game
- Mode: Single-player

Ecco: The Tides of Time (Japanese: Ecco the Dolphin 2 (エコー・ザ・ドルフィン2)) is an action-adventure video game developed by Novotrade International, published by Sega, and released for most of Sega's then-supported gaming consoles in 1994. It is the second game in the Ecco the Dolphin series. The Tides of Time continued the story of the first game and featured similar gameplay with a few new additions.

== Gameplay ==
The Tides of Time maintains the same gameplay as its predecessor. Ecco's main attack is to ram into enemies at high speeds, while his sonar is used to communicate with other cetaceans and interact with certain objects such as crystal Glyphs, as well as bring up a map of the area through echolocation. By combining his charge and sonar, Ecco can attack enemies from a distance. As a mammal, Ecco is also required to surface for air at regular intervals.

New puzzles include following other dolphins through an underwater maze and a "scavenger hunt" in which Ecco must collect the Asterite's missing globes. Two new power-ups were also introduced. The first is the "Pulsar", which grants Ecco the ability to fire a multi-directional sonar attack at enemies for the duration of the stage. The second is the "Metasphere", which transforms Ecco into different animals. The transformations are level-specific and include a seagull, a jellyfish, a shark, a school of fish, and a Vortex drone.

Some stages use a pseudo-3D effect. In these stages, Ecco must swim through moving rings while avoiding or attacking enemies. The player is forced to restart if Ecco misses too many rings or takes too much damage.

== Plot ==
The Tides of Time continues from the ending of the original game, in which Ecco had saved his dolphin pod and the Earth from the Vortex aliens. Still wielding the powers granted to him by the ancient life-form known as the Asterite, Ecco has since returned to his peaceful life in Earth's waters. One day, while Ecco is out exploring an underwater cave, a powerful earthquake causes an avalanche. As Ecco recovers, he learns that the Asterite's powers have left him (indicated by the return of his need to surface for air). His fellow dolphins explain that something has killed the Asterite and is now spreading fear among the ocean life.

Soon after, Ecco meets a dolphin with unusually long fins. She is his descendant, Trellia, who takes him to the distant future to speak with "an old friend". In the future, the ocean has developed its own mind and is connected across the planet by waterways traveling through the sky. The dolphins of the future have also evolved, as they are now able to fly through a combination of internal helium sacs and telekinetic powers.

After exploring the future, Ecco finds his old friend the Asterite, who explains the events that had transpired in Ecco's time. Though Ecco had defeated the Vortex, the Vortex Queen survived and followed him back to Earth, where she killed the Asterite of Ecco's time and now nests and feeds to restore her brood. The Asterite then tells Ecco that when he used the Atlantean Time Machine to save his pod, he split the stream of time in two. One possible future for Earth is a bright, happy world of flying dolphins, while the other is a dead, mechanical world sucked dry by the Vortex. As a result, Ecco is referred to as "the stone that split the stream of time in two".

Once back in his own time, Ecco travels to the Moray Abyss, where he finds the first two globes of the Asterite after clearing out the giant moray eels. He then journeys to revive the Asterite by finding its many globes that have been scattered across the ocean. Slowly, the Asterite begins to recover, and eventually is able to hold a full conversation with Ecco. However, it cannot help Ecco, as the Vortex of the dark future took its last pair of globes back to their own time. As the Atlantean Time Machine can only go into the past, Ecco must find another way to reach the dark future.

Ecco makes his way to the Lunar Bay, which the Vortex have stripped of all ocean life as they continue to grow and multiply. As he explores, Ecco is ambushed by Vortex drones and taken to the dark future. Unlike the future of before, the Vortex Future is a lifeless planet-spanning machine consisting of water tubes, artificial gravity, and dangerous Vortex creatures. Ecco locates the Asterite's last two globes in a chamber, where a bubble-chained holding device called the Globe Holder resides. After destroying it, Ecco obtains the globes and is warped back to his era.

With the Asterite complete again, Ecco's former powers are restored, and the Asterite summons all of Ecco's fellow dolphins to join in fighting the Vortex. As the dolphins and the Vortex do battle in the now-transformed Lunar Bay, Ecco swims to the deepest parts and infiltrates the Vortex's New Machine, then finally confronts the Vortex Queen and seemingly destroys her once and for all.

As his pod celebrates their victory over the vanquished Vortex, Ecco returns to the Asterite and is told to go to Atlantis and destroy the Time Machine in order to prevent the stream of time from ever being split again. Arriving in the sunken city, Ecco discovers that the Vortex Queen is still alive as a larva after her supposed death, and the two of them race to the Time Machine. The Vortex Queen uses the Time Machine first and is sent to the Prehistoric Era, where she finds herself unable to rule over the creatures that reside there. Faced with the need to survive, the Queen is forced to adapt to Earth's own life-cycles, and through the eons, the Vortex are integrated into the ecosystems of Earth as arthropods. Ecco chooses to use the Time Machine instead of destroying it, and vanishes into an unknown era.

== Release ==
=== Game Gear version ===
A version of Ecco: The Tides of Time was released for the Game Gear, though in a heavily altered form. All the levels were redesigned to work within the handheld's weaker abilities, and several levels and story scenes were removed completely.

=== Soundtrack ===
As with Ecco the Dolphin, the Sega CD version of The Tides of Time features an alternate soundtrack composed by Spencer Nilsen. The Genesis/Mega Drive version features a soundtrack composed by Attila Dobos, András Magyari, David Javelosa and Andy Armer.

In 1996, a soundtrack album combining music from both Ecco the Dolphin and Ecco: The Tides of Time was released, under the title Ecco: Songs of Time. A rendition of The Tides of Time soundtrack was commissioned for the first BBC Proms gaming music concert in 2022.

== Reception ==
Reception

Review score
Publication	Score
Mega Console	91/100

Reviewing the Genesis version, GamePro commented that Ecco: The Tides of Time retains the best points of the first Ecco game, such as its gameplay concept and lifelike animations, while having much more accessible difficulty. While they cited some problems with the controls, they praised Ecco's new transformation ability, remarked that "All the game's audio is simple, soothing and effective", and recommended the game as an improvement over the original. The four reviewers of Electronic Gaming Monthly gave the Genesis version a 7.25 out of ten, likewise declaring it an improvement over the original, though for the opposite reason: two of the reviewers said it was much more difficult than the first game. They particularly applauded the game's remarkably colorful graphics. Next Generation reviewed the Genesis version of the game, rating it three stars out of five, and stated that "Taxing puzzles, RPG elements, shooting stages, and some of the best Genesis graphics to date make you want to reel Ecco II in, but it's certainly not a keeper."

Reviewing the Game Gear version, GamePro warned that the game is very slow-paced and difficult, but felt it to be "worth the effort", praising the varied gameplay and beautifully colorful graphics. Though citing issues with the slow pacing and the controls, Electronic Gaming Monthly gave it a mild recommendation, particularly praising the smooth animations and striking colors. They scored it a 6.5 out of ten.

GamePro's review of the Sega CD version declared: "Like the recent Genesis version, Tides of Time Sega CD is an excellent sequel, offering enchanting graphics and sounds." They also remarked that the History Glyphs, an exclusive feature of the Sega CD version, add to the enjoyment of the game. Next Generation agreed, saying they are "very nicely done, and completely charming." Also noting the improved graphics and music of the Sega CD version, they gave it three out of five stars. Electronic Gaming Monthly gave it a 7.6 out of ten, with Mike Weigand commenting: "Take the Ecco 2 game and add beautiful music and excellent sound effects and you get the Ecco 2 CD. Fans of the dolphin series (like me) will probably love this one, others will probably be converted."

IGN gave the Virtual Console release of Ecco: The Tides of Time a 7/10, and stated that "this underwater adventure's lack of direction may leave you lost at sea." NintendoLife said that "for a Megadrive game Ecco 2 looks amazing. Ecco has a 3D rendered quality much like what is found in Donkey Kong Country", and finally concluded that "you’ll have a whale of a time", giving the game a 7/10. GameSpot criticized the game for being "simply more of the same" as the first Ecco game, with all the same frustrations. Though they remarked that the music and a number of moments of the gameplay are outstanding, they concluded the game to be overall not worth buying, and gave it a 5.5 out of ten. Australia's Official Nintendo Magazine listed Ecco: The Tides of Time as one of the 20 Classic Sega Games You Must Play, saying that "there is really nothing quite like Ecco the Dolphin."

== Legacy ==
A sequel was planned for Tides to finish the series as a trilogy. This game was scrapped and Sega released a spin-off called Ecco Jr. instead. The series was later brought back on the Dreamcast with an entirely different storyline in Ecco the Dolphin: Defender of the Future.

In April 2026, A&R Atelier, a studio created by members of the original Ecco development team, announced Ecco the Dolphin: Complete, a compilation containing a new Ecco game, as well as multiple versions of Ecco the Dolphin and The Tides of Time.
