= Exosquad =

Television series

- Title screen of the first season
- Genre: Space opera Military science fiction
- Created by: Jeff Segal
- Developed by: Eric Lewald (season 1); Michael Edens (season 2)
- Directed by: Graham Morris
- Voices of: Lisa Ann Beley; Robby Benson; Michael Benyaer; Garry Chalk; Michael Donovan; Janyse Jaud; David Kaye; Richard Newman; John Payne; Teryl Rothery
- Composer: Michael Tavera
- Country of origin: United States
- Original language: English
- No. of seasons: 2
- No. of episodes: 52 (list of episodes)

Production
- Executive producers: Will Meugniot; Jeff Segal
- Producer: Dennis J. Woodyard
- Running time: 21 minutes
- Production company: Universal Cartoon Studios

Original release
- Network: Syndication (Universal Family Network)
- Release: September 18, 1993 – November 3, 1994

Exosquad is an American science fiction animated television series created by Universal Cartoon Studios for MCA TV's Universal Family Network syndicated programming block. The series ran for two complete seasons in syndication from 1993 to 1994. Reruns later aired on USA Network.

== Premise ==
At the beginning of the 22nd century, an interplanetary war takes place between humanity and Neosapiens, a race artificially created as workers/slaves for the Terrans. The narrative generally follows Able Squad, an elite Terran unit of exoframe pilots, on their missions all over the Solar System.

== Plot ==
Season	Episodes	Originally released	
Season	Episodes	First released	Last released
1	13	September 18, 1993	December 11, 1993
2	39	September 29, 1994	November 3, 1994

The series is set in the years 2119–2121 AD, decades after humanity ("Terrans") has expanded beyond Earth, terraforming and colonizing Venus and Mars. These three planets are "the Homeworlds", the core first of the Terran interplanetary state and later of Neosapien Commonwealth. Not all Terrans are affiliated with the Homeworlds, however: there is an independent faction of Pirate Clans, descendants of Terran criminals exiled to the Outer Planets who live off looted Homeworlds' space freighters. The first episode opens with the Earth Congress dispatching the entire Exofleet, humanity's space-based military, to counter the Pirate threat.

With war with the Pirate Clans looming, an uprising begins among the Neosapiens, an artificial humanoid race coexisting with Terrans. In the back-story, the Neosapiens were used primarily as slaves during the colonization of Mars and Venus and therefore have been engineered to be physically stronger and better adapted to hostile environments than humans. Their mistreatment by Terrans led to the First Neosapien Revolt fifty years before the series' begin, which was mercilessly crushed but had brought some positive changes into their lives. Still not content with his fate, the Neosapien Governor of Mars, Phaeton, sets a new insurrection, codenamed "Operation [Neosapien] Destiny", in motion as soon as the Exofleet leaves to chase after the Pirate Clans. The absence of the Exofleet is also a part of Phaeton's plan as it enables the Neosapiens' capture of the Homeworlds without much effort.

The series follows the progress of Able Squad, an elite unit of exoframe pilots composed of J.T. Marsh, Nara Burns, Maggie Weston, Kaz Takagi, Alec DeLeon, Rita Torres, Wolf Bronsky, and Marsala. Their exploits unfold against the backdrop of the ongoing Neosapien War, as the squad participates in events often crucial to turning its tide. The show features a realistic outlook on war: many characters die in combat, military operations are carefully planned and reconnoitered in advance, and psychological effects of warfare are explored. For example, separate episodes detail Exofleet's reconnaissance of Venus prior to its recapture, the actual liberation, and the repulse of the first Neosapien reconquest attempt. Moreover, even after Venus is retaken by Terrans, several episodes deal with the remaining Venusian resistance and Neosapien forces who hid across Venus, refusing to surrender and awaiting reinforcements.

The second season draws to a close with the defeat of the Neosapiens and the liberation of Earth, but it ends with a cliffhanger suggesting that a third season would describe a war against a new alien race, and that the Terrans and the Neosapiens would be forced to ally with each other.

Moreover, a clone of Phaeton was discovered in the final episodes by the Terrans, who were at a loss as to what to do about his existence as they didn't want to unleash another Phaeton on society, but also didn't wish to condemn the clone for his predecessor's actions. The series was cancelled soon after the end of the second season so a third season was never made.

== Voice cast ==
The Able Squad. Counter-clockwise from top-right: Marsala, DeLeon, Takagi, Weston, Burns, Bronsky, Torres. Middle: J.T. Marsh

- Kathleen Barr - Lt. Colleen O'Reilly, Cmdr. DeSoto, Doc, Medusa
- Lisa Ann Beley - Lt. Nara Burns, Cruiser
- Michael Benyaer - Kaz Takagi, Praetorius, Exial
- Robby Benson - Lt. J.T. Marsh, Jonas Simbacca
- Sylvia Biller - Linda
- A.J. Bond - Exoscout
- Garry Chalk - Marsala, General Shiva, Nick Tyree, Charles McKenna, Pirate XO, Kruger, Albrecht Ketzer (1st voice)
- Ewan Sutherland Clark - Jinx Madison (1st voice)
- Allen Stewart-Coates - Glycon
- Ian James Corlett - Enleal
- Paul Dobson - Thrax
- Michael Donovan - Wolf Bronski, Professor Algernon, Picasso (1st voice), James Burns, Jubail, Minister Guidas, Voodoo, General Drusus, Sulla, Albrecht Ketzer (2nd voice)
- David Kaye - General Draconis (2nd voice), Hallas, Vince Pellegrino
- Terry Klassen - Picasso (2nd voice), George, Kor, Turner, Cates
- Karin Konoval - Livia (1st voice), Cpt. Levitch
- Janyse Jaud - Sgt. Rita Torres
- Campbell Lane - Lysander
- Wally Marsh - Admiral Winfield
- Scott McNeil - Jinx Madison (2nd voice), Lt. Yuri Stavrogan, Lucullus, Sullust, Denny Bourigum, Neo Lord
- Rob Morton - Typhonus, Peter Tanaka, Cpt. Furlong, J.J. Grimley, Sgt. Felson, Gracchus, Wotan
- Richard Newman - Phaeton, Cpt. Marcus, Barca, Ramon Longfeather, Pirate Base Commander, President Jonathan Perion, Sharos, Sidney, Stentor
- John Payne - Lt. Alec DeLeon, Sean Napier, Xenobius
- Teryl Rothery - Lt. Maggie Weston, Diana, Livia (2nd voice), Eve Hanley, Amanda Connor, E-Frame Computer
- Tony Sampson - Pirate
- Alvin Sanders - Cpt. Avery Butler
- Ken Camroux-Taylor - General Draconis (1st voice), Court-martial judge
- Marcus Turner - Pirate
- Stevie Vallance - Lt. Alice Noretti
- Cathy Weseluck - Red
- Dale Wilson - Galba

== Production ==
The show was conceived in 1989 by Jeff Segal, who had been head writer and story editor of Challenge of the GoBots for Hanna-Barbera Productions prior to joining Universal as President of Universal Cartoon Studios. Segal intended to create another robotic boy-action property. The show was originally entitled Exoforce. It was modified in 1993 and the title was changed to Exosquad (as a result of a trademark conflict) when Playmates Toys made a deal for the master toy license. Segal received "Created by" credit on the show, but Will Meugniot contributed immensely to the look and style of the show, and Michael Edens, as story editor, supervised development of episodic stories and helped to guide the story arc.

Exosquad was among the first animated series by Universal Animation Studios (then known as Universal Cartoon Studios) and was created under influence of anime imported from Japan. As a result, its complex storyline covered a large number of topics from war through romance to genetic engineering and was able to appeal to a broad audience. Although the first season ran for only thirteen episodes in 1993, the rising popularity of the show allowed Universal to make the second one three times as long. In its second season, Exosquad was put together with another action series from Universal, Monster Force. The series animation was provided for Universal by AKOM in South Korea.

As the second season progressed, some characters, according to Michael Edens, "took on a life of [their] own": for example, Nara Burns killing Phaeton and the Neosapien Thrax becoming a major recurring character after his initial appearance were not pre-planned. Another character, Alec DeLeon, was supposed to perish in the destruction of Mars but the Universal executives strongly opposed it, so he was killed several episodes later, on the Moon, only to be promptly resurrected in a Neo Mega body.

The show was purportedly cancelled after 52 episodes because at that time, many independent production companies were being taken over by larger networks, who wanted to produce their own content. Exosquad was eventually moved to poor time slots, such as 4 a.m., until the ratings were no longer sufficient to sustain it. The final episode detailed the post-war political and social climate prevalent in the Exosquad universe, and closed with J.T. Marsh engaging a group of alien space vessels, whose exact nature was to be explained in the third season or a feature film. Michael Edens later remarked that the staff originally planned the aliens to be insectoid and that the Pirates' dark matter, Dr. Ketzer's experiments, and the unactivated clone of Phaeton would have played a great role in fighting them. The idea of a film based on Exosquad was being promoted by executive producer Jeff Segal, and it was also planned to expand the fictional universe with a spin-off series, then codenamed Exo-Pirates. Both initiatives were scrapped with the cancellation of the third season.

== Themes ==
Exosquad had a serious approach to the plot with several intertwined narrative threads and a number of characters displaying a full spectrum of human emotions, relationships and experiences, such as friendship, love, hatred, tragedy, treachery, and responsibility for others. Prejudice and racism are recurring themes in the series, as both Terrans and Neosapiens are shown to harbor hatred and a sense of superiority towards each other. Interplanetary politics and space war, typical for military science fiction, were presented with an assumption of the fictional future history of the Solar System up to that point. The Able Squad's duties became more spread out as the second season unfolded, and there were separate story arcs on Mars, Venus, Earth, and in space. Espionage and intrigue were often featured instead of straightforward battles.

Will Meugniot, the executive producer of the series, once compared anime series Mobile Suit Gundam and Exosquad to the Pacific and the European Theaters of World War II, respectively. Michael Edens recalled in an interview that the plot was supposed to remind of the Second World War, too, for example with the Neosapien reconquest attempt of Venus, capture of the Moon and battle for Chicago paralleling the battles of the Bulge, Okinawa, and Berlin, respectively.

The series is named after the multi-purpose mecha-like powered exoskeletons mostly utilized as armored combat vehicles or reinforced body armor by the characters.

== Home media ==
The first season of Exosquad was released on seven VHS cassettes shortly after its original run, and in 2007, it was made available on Hulu video on demand service. The complete second season was published on Hulu in February 2009. The first season has been made available on Zune Marketplace. Universal Studios Home Entertainment released the 13 episodes comprising the first season of Exosquad on DVD on April 14, 2009, as a two-disc set. Only three episodes in this set ("Seeds of Deception", "Resist", and "Betrayal") have the actual Season One opening; the other ten episodes are incorrectly shown with the Season Two opening. The series became available on Peacock on July 15, 2020.

== Merchandise and other media ==
Between 1993 and 1996, Playmates Toys produced a line of action figures and model kits of exoframes and spaceships featured in the television series. The descriptions of the toys are a major source of Exosquad universe lore. The toys were often compared to the popular Robotech franchise, and Playmates acquired the license to Robotech to produce both toy lines under the same label, spawning rumors of a possible crossover. This possibility was considered by the authors but later abandoned. Today the Exosquad toys are considered highly collectible along with their boxes.

A Sega Genesis video game under the same title was developed by Appaloosa Interactive and published by Playmates in 1995. The series was also adapted into a comic book by Topps Comics in 1994. Additionally, an interactive movie book was released, as well as a board game.
