= Chakan: The Forever Man =

1992 video game

- Developer: Extended Play
- Publisher: Sega
- Designers: Jon Miller; Mark Miller
- Platforms: Sega Genesis; Game Gear
- Release: NA: November 1992; EU: February 1993
- Genre: 2D action platformer
- Mode: Single-player

Chakan: The Forever Man is a Sega Genesis and Game Gear video game published by Sega in 1992.

It is based upon a comic book of the same name, written by Robert A. Kraus, and was produced by Ed Annunziata, who met Chakan's creator at a convention and was impressed. In addition to composing, Chakan is also Mark Miller's only work as a gameplay and level designer.

== Gameplay ==
The player plays as Chakan and starts the game in a central hub stage, where they can select one of four element-based "planes" of earth, air, fire , and water, each with three levels for a total of 12 levels. The player advances through each platforming level until completion or death, whereupon Chakan is returned to the hub to choose a new level on either the same or a different plane. The player has infinite lives, but will be returned to the hub if he is "killed". At the bottom of the screen, an hourglass indicates how much time the player has to finish all the levels in the plane. If time runs out, the player is returned to the hub and must restart the plane from its first level. Chakan starts with his characteristic twin swords, but acquires a new weapon in the first stage of each element, such as the Grappling Hook, which allows him to latch on to hooks and climb, and the Hammer, which can break through certain walls. Chakan can also collect potions in each of the four elements, which he can combine and use to give himself temporary buffs such as enhancing his swords with elemental powers or increasing his jump height.

Upon defeating the three levels and the enemy bosses for each plane, Chakan clears the "terrestrial plane" and embarks upon a quest to defeat four "elemental planes of evil," which consists of another three levels and a boss for fire, earth, wind, and water. These levels are considerably harder than the initial four sets of planes.

== Plot ==
The game follows the tale of Chakan, a warrior who is so confident in his swordsmanship that he declares even Death cannot best him in battle. Death appears and challenges Chakan: if Chakan can defeat him, he will be granted eternal life. However, if Death wins, he will become Death's eternal servant. The battle rages on for several days until Chakan emerges as the victor. Death grants him his reward, but additionally condemns him to wander all of existence until all supernatural evil is destroyed.

After he has slain the supernatural evils of all dimensions, Chakan is shown stabbing himself with his sword in anticipation of his promised death. Death replies that every star in the universe contains a planet filled with supernatural evil, so Chakan's curse remains unlifted. The player is given a single attempt to defeat one such cosmic supernatural evil as a final boss in the game; if unsuccessful, Chakan states that "rest will come another day". If Chakan defeats the boss, an hourglass background used in the plot exposition screens appears without any text, and after fifteen minutes, a single line of text appears saying "Not the end".

== Development ==
Artist Robert Kraus created Chakan from a sketch that he described as “a cowboy-looking character that looked like a cross between a zombie and Clint Eastwood”, and the character at first received backup stories in Kraus's superhero comic Thundermace before getting his own title in 1990, all published by his own label RAK Graphics. While having a booth at the Gen Con tabletop games convention in Milwaukee, Kraus met Sega producer Ed Annunziata, who was so engaged by the character and concepts of Chakan that he soon was thinking about turning it into a video game, eventually making a deal with Kraus to license the character.

San Francisco-based Recreational Brainware, whose founders Burt Sloane and Jonathan Miller had worked under Annunziata in Spider-Man vs. The Kingpin and had just finished Taz-Mania, were brought in for the project. But early in development the company was dissolved, with Miller continuing development in a new studio he formed with programmer David Foley, Extended Play, using Sloane's development tools built for the previous two games. Miller did Chakan's mechanics, Foley would handle character intelligence and level layouts, and two extra programmers were hired in Dean Sitton and Beth Carter. Miller was forced to take a leave near the end of development to care for his cancer-stricken brother David, leading Annunziata to bring Sloane first as a consulting programmer for the bosses and then lead programmer to finish the game, with Sloane being credited as "Stunt Programmer".

Miller's brother Mark, whose previous game experience involved only writing music, was intrigued by the comic's concept enough to try level design. Mark typically sketched the levels at the San Francisco bar Noc Nocs, asking other patrons for feedback, and stated that the bar's DJ influenced in creating a score that was charged with sound as opposed to traditional musical themes. For the art direction Miller brought from Greendog: The Beached Surfer Dude! developer Interactive Designs couple Steven and Mira Ross, who were given creative freedom for their "dark, moody, H.R. Giger-esque” art, which involved characters and scenery not originated from the comics and exploiting features like parallax scrolling. Steven said the game's pixellated look owed to his lack of experience with pixel art and the Genesis limited palette regarding darker colors.

The game's infamous difficulty level was both by design, as Mark Miller wanted to convey "the pain and the futility of Chakan’s circular existence" by giving players a non-linear experience that had to be repeated all the way if they died, and due to time constraints that hindered polishing gameplay aspects. Annunziata chose to have an extra boss after the credits and then the "Not the End" message to "share [Chakan's] pain" regarding how he keeps waiting for his mission to end but never reaches the conclusion.

== Reception ==
Reception

Review scores
Publication	Score
AllGame	3.5/5 (GG)
Sega Pro	76/100 (GEN)
Mega Action	88% (GEN)

The game is known for its unusually high difficulty level for its time of release, but it, like many early 90s games, still retains a dedicated cult following.

Sega Pro magazine gave the game an overall score of 76/100, praising the game's graphics as "well animated sprites [and] the backgrounds are detailed and atmospheric" and the game music as "deep, booming and atmospheric", concluding, "This could've been a classic game based on a novel scenario, but it's let down by the complete lack of action."

Mega Action gave the game an overall score of 88%, describing the game as an "excellent mix of cutesy and platform ingredients".

== Related games ==
A Game Gear game by the same name was published by Sega. It features very similar gameplay, but different level layouts and other changes to accommodate the weaker hardware. Extended Play was not involved but some of its personnel were credited given their assets were sent to programmer Paul Hutchinson, who was hired as an independent contractor and worked out of his home in Timonium, Maryland and later Gettysburg, Pennsylvania. Hutchinson chose to keep the experience as close to the Genesis game as possible. The portable version has a title screen synthesized voice shouting "Chakan, the Forever Man" which the Genesis version did not.

A sequel was planned by Ed Annunziata's studio AndNow, first for the Dreamcast in 2001, which Annunziata also intended to port to other platforms, and then for the iPad in 2012, but neither project was finished.

Some Legacy of Kain fans have claimed that much of the work on the Chakan sequel was later absorbed into the 2002 game Blood Omen 2, although this is unconfirmed and the only concrete link between the games is the presence of director Steve Ross. Ross and colleague Jon Miller both publicly attributed the similarities to a common look of Ross' work than any intentional reuse.
