= Kolibri (video game) =

1995 video game

- North American cover art
- Developer: Novotrade International
- Publisher: Sega
- Producer: Ed Annunziata
- Designer: Ed Annunziata
- Platform: 32X
- Release: EU: November 17, 1995; NA: November 1995
- Genre: Scrolling shooter
- Modes: Single-player, multiplayer

Kolibri is a 1995 horizontally scrolling shooter video game developed by Novotrade International (now known as Appaloosa) and published by Sega for the 32X, an add-on for the Sega Genesis console. Kolibri is the word or root word for hummingbird in several European languages.

== Gameplay and premise ==
In-game screenshot

Long ago, a crystal from outer space embedded itself in the earth and started creating life. Soon another similar crystal crashed to earth and started to destroy what the first crystal had created and started to sap away its strength. Before being fully destroyed, the crystal gave a lone hummingbird simply named Kolibri (Hummingbird in most European languages), its power. It is up to this hummingbird to save the earth.

The game offers numerous power-ups for the player's kolibri. Each one follows different patterns. Some are spread shots and others will home in on an enemy. This game also features a good number of puzzles which grow increasingly difficult with each level.

Producer Ed Annunziata was inspired by an encounter with a hummingbird flying in front of his face, onto which he exhaled his cigarette smoke, and days later the same hummingbird returned, and "this time I could sense it's aggression. I am convinced that he was pissed that I second-hand smoked him, and he remembered me. He was an angry bird; he was calling me out!" He decided to research said birds, and intrigued by their flight capabilities opted to make a shooter based around a hummingbird.

== Reception ==
Reception

Review scores
Publication	Score
AllGame	3.5/5
Computer and Video Games	70/100
Electronic Gaming Monthly	7.5/10, 6.5/10, 7/10, 7/10
Game Informer	6.25/10
Game Players	63%
GameFan	85/100, 86/100, 88/100
Mean Machines Sega	83/100
Next Generation	2/5
Retro	4/5
Sega Power	81%
Sega Pro	87%
Sega Saturn Magazine	78%
Ultimate Gamer	7/10

Kolibri received mostly middling reviews. Sega Saturn Magazine commented, "Large and complex, Kolibri offers value for money, but a certain dullness and insipidity accompanies it". Electronic Gaming Monthly's four editors praised the game's impressive visuals and originality, but highly criticized how the game restarts the player character in a highly vulnerable position each time it dies.

GamePro's Lawrence Neves found the visuals impressive, but was not convinced of the game's originality, remarking that "Although the concept is unique, the gameplay and FunFactor are standard". Neves also commented that the power-ups look weak, needing to manually turn the bird around to shoot enemies behind him is cumbersome and frustrating, and the bird often gets lost in the backgrounds. He concluded, "Kolibri isn't awful, just average. You'd expect more from the 32X—something more along the lines of Gradius or R-Type". Next Generation felt that the game did not have anything which could not have been done on the stock Genesis and suffers from "very monotonous" gameplay, though they reserved most of their criticism for the "absurd" premise: "Trying to remember why you bought that 32X? Well, Sega is hoping you've been waiting for the ultimate hummingbird simulation game. That's right, in Kolibri you are a hummingbird (not even a wisecracking, zany hummingbird with an attitude, just a hummingbird) and you fly around toasting insects with the guided missile on your beak".

In 2001, webcomic Penny Arcade lampooned the game in their 25th anniversary "We're Right Awards," calling it the "Best Hummingbird-based Shooter Available For The 32X."
