= List of Exosquad episodes =

Exosquad is an American animated television series created by Universal Cartoon Studios for MCA TV's Universal Family Network syndicated programming block as a response to anime. The show is set in the beginning of the 22nd century and covers the interplanetary war between humanity and Neosapiens, a fictional race artificially created as workers/slaves for the Terrans. The narrative generally follows Able Squad, an elite Terran unit of mecha pilots, on their missions all over the Solar System, although other storylines are also abundant. The series ran for two complete seasons in syndication from 1993 to 1994. Reruns later aired on USA Network.

== Series overview ==
Season	Episodes	Originally released	
Season	Episodes	First released	Last released
1	13	September 18, 1993	December 11, 1993
2	39	September 29, 1994	November 3, 1994

== Episodes ==
=== Season 1 (1993) ===
No. overall	No. in season	Title	Written by	Original release date
1	1	"Pirate Scourge" "Fall of the Human Empire Part 1"	Eric Lewald and Michael Edens	September 18, 1993
A Pirate attack on a Homeworld freighter, led by the ruthless Jonas Simbacca, results in loss of lives and finally prompts the Homeworlds Congress to recognize the Pirate threat. A task force, consisting of most of the Exofleet, is assembled to neutralize the Pirate bases on the moons of Saturn. En route, it is caught in a Pirate trap.
2	2	"Seeds of Deception" "Fall of the Human Empire Part 2"	Mark Edens	September 25, 1993
In a fleet engagement, the Exofleet emerges victorious over the Pirate forces. On Earth, Sean Napier prevents the assassination of Phaeton, the Neosapien Governor of Mars, but is kicked off the police force for refusing to accept Phaeton's congratulations. The Exofleet prepares to attack the Pirate base on Enceladus.
3	3	"Hidden Terrors" "Fall of the Human Empire Part 3"	Michael Edens	October 2, 1993
Hammered by the Pirate base's defenses, the Exofleet deploys the Able Squad to take them out. The Neo Martian finance minister discovers massive unauthorized withdrawals from the Neosapien treasury. Phaeton reveals that the money has gone to a colossal secret military build-up, aiming to take over the Homeworlds, while the Exofeet is tied up with the Pirate threat.
4	4	"Blitzkrieg" "Fall of the Human Empire Part 4"	Michael Edens	October 9, 1993
The Exofleet races back from Saturn to Earth, hoping to return in time to stop the Neosapien attack. The Able Squad CO Lt. Marsh is charged with mutiny when he disagrees with Captain Marcus' suicidal decision to split the fleet, sending the fastest ships ahead of the rest. Napier escapes from a labor camp and tries to organize a small resistance cell.
5	5	"Resist!" "Fall of the Human Empire Part 5"	Michael Edens	October 16, 1993
While Exofleet takes heavy losses in the engagement with the Neosapien fleet, the Able Squad frees Marsh and charges on the Neosapien flagship, allowing the main fleet to escape. With the fleet left for Outer Planets, the Squad lands on Earth and has to overcome the Resistance's initial anger and mistrust. Together, they broadcast a public speech, urging the Terrans to resist Phaeton's regime, after which the Able Squad escapes the planet on a shuttle.
6	6	"Target: Earth" "Veil of Doom Part 1"	Mark Edens	October 23, 1993
After serving one year in the brig for insubordination, Marsh, DeLeon, and Marsala are dropped onto Earth again to deal with the Neosapiens' ultimate planetary defence weapon, the GRAF Shield. The newest Squad member, Alice Noretti, is killed during the atmospheric entry. Cooperating with the Resistance, Marsh captures the alleged inventor of the GRAF, only to discover that the real one is on Venus.
7	7	"A Traitor Among Us" "Veil of Doom Part 2"	Susan Talkington and Brian Miller	October 30, 1993
Marsh and his men are ordered to continue their mission by blending in with the Terran "undesirables" about to be deported to Venus. En route, they discover a traitorous Resistance member but before they can do anything, the space barge they are on is purportedly sent into the Sun by the Neosapien pilots.
8	8	"Scorched Venus" "Veil of Doom Part 3"	Michael Edens	November 6, 1993
Marsala manages to save the barge and crash-land it on Venus. There, the exotroopers are captured by the Venus Resistance who hope to trade them for food, as the Neosapiens have been starving Venusian Terrans out ever since the initial assault. Meanwhile, the rest of the Able Squad lands on Venus to search for Nara Burns who ran off to look for her parents. The Resistance traitor makes her way to the Neosapiens.
9	9	"Sabotage" "Veil of Doom Part 4"	Michael Edens	November 13, 1993
Burns finds her brother, who is now the Resistance leader who captured Marsh and persuades him to cancel the "deal" with the Neosapiens. The Able Squad attacks the Venusian GRAF Shield installation and extracts Terran Professor Algernon, its real inventor. Algernon sabotages the Shield, making it possible for the Exofleet to approach Venus again.
10	10	"Abandoned" "Into the Heart of Darkness Part 1"	Jim Carlson and Terrence McDonnell	November 20, 1993
Discontent with Admiral Winfield's passivity, Captain Marcus sends the Able Squad on a suicide mission to Mars and mutinies against Winfield.
11	11	"The Brood" "Into the Heart of Darkness Part 2"	Stephen Levi	November 27, 1993
Captain Marcus' attack on Earth is a disaster, as Phaeton recalls all troops from Mars and Marcus has to sacrifice his flagship Resolute and his own life to let the rest of Exofleet escape again. Meanwhile, with their way cleared, the Able Squad proceeds to discover an enormous Neosapien breeding facility under the Olympus Mons.
12	12	"Betrayal" "Into the Heart of Darkness Part 3"	Bob Forward	December 4, 1993
Marsala seemingly betrays Terrans but this is revealed to be a mere pretense to get close enough to Phaeton and take him hostage. When the Able Squad is freed, General Typhonus sends in the E-frames to eliminate them. Meanwhile, the Exofleet remnants set course for Io.
13	13	"Defying Olympus" "Into the Heart of Darkness Part 4"	Michael Edens	December 11, 1993
The Able Squad takes Phaeton hostage and prepares the demolition of the breeding facility. Phaeton escapes and returns in his E-frame to stop them but is defeated by Marsh. As the Squad barely escapes from Mars, Olympus Mons erupts, destroying the brood chamber and shattering Phaeton's plans of domination through numbers. Phaeton himself is injured and contracts the Automutation Syndrome.

=== Season 2 (1994) ===
No. overall	No. in season	Title	Written by	Original release date
14	2.01	"The Gathering"	Michael Edens and Steve Sustarsic	September 29, 1994
Admiral Winfield sends Marsh and DeLeon to negotiate an alliance with the Pirate Clans against the Neosapiens. Meanwhile, the rest of the Able Squad extracts the Homeworlds Resistance cell leaders to meet the Admiral. General Typhonus lays siege on Io.
15	2.02	"The Embassy"	Michael Edens and Bob Forward	September 30, 1994
Phaeton learns about Marsh's mission from a Pirate traitor and orders Typhonus to prevent the alliance at all costs. Meanwhile, Winfield teams up with Sean Napier, who is appointed the Commander of entire Earth Resistance, and develops plans of coordinated assaults with other cell leaders. On Tethys, Marsh wins a ritual duel against Jubail but Pirate leader Simbacca is still reluctant to ally himself with Exofleet.
16	2.03	"Pirate's Ransom"	Michael Edens; Mark Edens; Ted Pedersen and Francis Moss	October 3, 1994
Typhonus takes Simbacca prisoner to disrupt the negotiations, but Marsh, DeLeon, and a Pirate Lieutenant Hallas manage to free him and in return, the Pirate leader accepts the alliance.
17	2.04	"Ultimate Weapon"	Mark Edens; Jim Carlson and Terrence McDonnell	October 4, 1994
En route to Io, Simbacca requests Marsh to teach several chosen Pirates (including Hallas) to pilot E-frames. Their first battle experience is an assault on Neosapien Fusion Pulse Cannon on Sinope, a superweapon which threatened both the Pirate Fleet and the Exofleet on Io. Winfield finally meets Simbacca in person.
18	2.05	"Expendable"	Mark Edens and Len Wein	October 5, 1994
Typhonus learns that GRAF Shield on Io is not operational and forces Exofleet further away from the Homeworlds. A large Pirate fleet comes to Exofleet's aid, however, allowing it to escape to the secret Pirate stronghold of Chaos. Phaeton has Typhonus executed for his incompetence and replaced with his (Typhonus') clone.
19	2.06	"Mind Set"	Mark Edens and Shari Goodhartz	October 6, 1994
The Able Squad delivers Napier back to Earth and proceeds on a mission to extract members of former Homeworlds Congress, now imprisoned by Neosapiens. By accident, they meet Amanda Connor, Napier's ex-wife who is now collaborating with Neosapien propaganda machine. The mission is a success and Phaeton orders Connor imprisoned for her involvement with it.
20	2.07	"The Last Man"	Mark Edens and Brooks Wachtel	October 7, 1994
The Jumptroops make their first big appearance, infiltrating the Neosapien facility on Ceres and capturing one of the first Neo Megas. The Neo Mega attempts to escape but is killed by Vince Pellegrino.
21	2.08	"Dragon's Rock"	Mark Edens; Hans Beimler and Richard Manning	October 10, 1994
Burns and Bronsky deliver weapons to the Venusian Resistance but are captured by Neosapiens. Together with imprisoned Resistance fighters, they are forced to participate in building General Draconis' secret stronghold, "Dragon's Rock". Able Squad arrives to free them and help Resistance seize Draconis' weapons stockpile.
22	2.09	"Inner Dark"	Mark Edens; Jim Carlson and Terrence McDonnell	October 11, 1994
Traitorous Captain Barca persuades Hallas to assassinate Simbacca but he fails and is chased by the Able Squad. During the chase, the exotroopers discover a gigantic exocarrier built in secret by renegade Pirates and proceed to secure it. She is christened Resolute II, Exofleet's new flagship, and given to Simbacca who recovers and agrees to spare Hallas' life.
23	2.10	"The Dogs of War"	Mark Edens and Shari Goodhartz	October 12, 1994
Sgt. Torres contacts Phaeton City Resistance cell on a mission to capture a Neo Mega for study. Anticipating that, Neo Mega Sulla allows himself to be taken prisoner and transmits data on the cell to General Shiva. Shiva attacks but Napier's timely arrival allows the Resistance fighters to escape. Phaeton replaces Shiva with Livia as the Commanding General of Earth.
24	2.11	"The First Step"	Mark Edens; Ted Pedersen and Francis Moss	October 13, 1994
During Exofleet's reconquest of Mercury, Yuri Stavrogan, who is temporarily assigned to the Able Squad, rallies Kaz Takagi to go after the best pilot of the Neo Fleet, Thrax. Thrax eventually prevails but spares Takagi's life and leads the remaining Neosapien forces to Venus. This episode takes place at the same time as "Dogs of War".
25	2.12	"The Greatest Fear"	Mark Edens and Stephen Levi	October 14, 1994
Exofleet sends the Able Squad to reconnoiter Venus preparatory to its reconquest. Marsala is captured and transported to an installation researching the Automutation Syndrome as a test subject. Nara Burns manages to save him before the facility is demolished and, in process, captures a Neo Mega Lysander.
26	2.13	"Flesh Crawls"	Mark Edens and Richard Mueller	October 17, 1994
While transported to Chaos, Lysander is revealed to be a test subject of Automutation Syndrome experiments and uses his unusual abilities to kill most of the crew on the transport vessel. The survivors have to abandon and destroy the ship.
27	2.14	"Behind the Shield"	Mark Edens; Ted Pedersen and Francis Moss	October 18, 1994
The liberation of Venus begins with Able Squad destroying the GRAF Shield generator first seen in episode 9, but the Neo Megas have covertly constructed another one and activate it as Exofleet approaches the planet. Fortunately, GRAF is useless against cloaked Pirate ships and jumptroops land safely on the surface.
28	2.15	"Venus Rising"	Mark Edens and Brooks Wachtel	October 19, 1994
Terrans gradually retake Venus. James Burns leads Resistance's assault on the capital city Vesta but is incapacitated by General Draconis. Before escaping, Draconis orders Thrax to detonate a hydrogen bomb beneath the city which Thrax disobeys, saving thousands of lives. Phaeton arrives to Venusian orbit with the gigantic battleship Olympus Mons II.
29	2.16	"Miracle"	Mark Edens and Len Wein	October 20, 1994
When Neosapiens launch a counter-offensive, Barca sabotages Resolute II, so the Able Squad has to board Olympus Mons II and cripple her, too, leaving her open for Resolute's main cannons. As Phaeton seemingly goes down with his ship, Draconis abandons him only to soon discover that he betrayed Phaeton's clone and the real one orders him executed.
30	2.17	"Under the Skin"	Mark Edens and Matthew Edens	October 21, 1994
A Neosapien with Alice Noretti's (who was killed in episode 6) appearance and memories is sent to Venus, programmed to reunite with her squad and get close enough to Marsh and Winfield to assassinate the latter. The conflict between Neosapien programming and Terran personality, however, eventually results in her death.
31	2.18	"Ultimatum"	Mark Edens and Shari Goodhartz	October 31, 1994
Terran extremists on Venus kidnap Marsala, demanding that all Neosapiens, regardless of their loyalties, be deported from the planet. Knowing his sister's affection to Marsala, James Burns sneaks him out but they are ambushed by Neosapien guerrillas and James is killed while delivering Marsala to safety.
32	2.19	"Warrior Brood"	Mark Edens and Steve Cuden	November 1, 1994
Australian Resistance leader Nick Tyree launches liberation of Australia without permission from Napier, who travels there with the Able Squad. Before long, however, Phaeton dispatches the first generation of Neo Warriors to crush them and the survivors withdraw to Canberra.
33	2.20	"The Dream War"	Mark Edens and Martin Pasko	November 2, 1994
Extraction of survivors from Canberra fails and DeLeon and Weston are stranded in the desert, chased by Neo Warriors. Fortunately, they receive help in an aborigine camp and spend a night there. Napier escapes Australia.
34	2.21	"No Surrender"	Mark Edens; Ted Pedersen and Francis Moss	November 3, 1994
On Phaeton's orders, General Shiva offers to spare the lives of Terrans in Canberra if they surrender and hand over Marsh, which Tyree refuses. Shiva attacks but a jumptroop regiment arrives and takes him prisoner. In exchange for his life, the General lets the Resistance go.
35	2.22	"Fire Ship"	Mark Edens and Brooks Wachtel	October 11, 1994
Exofleet discovers a gigantic underground complex on Mars and sends E-frames to investigate it. They are ambushed by Neosapiens and the only survivors, Able Squad, are captured by Barca, who locks them in a fire ship provided by General Typhonus and sends her to Resolute II. With Hallas' help, the Squad manages to turn the vessel around and ram it into Barca's own ship. Hallas is severely injured.
36	2.23	"Martian Luck"	Mark Edens and Matthew Edens	October 12, 1994
Typhonus uses a captured spy to lure Able Squad into a trap, as they descend to Mars again. Torres is shot down and believed dead by her team but is, in fact, rescued by a group of ExoScouts (E-frame pilot cadets) stranded on Mars since their Scout Leader was killed.
37	2.24	"The Lost Patrol"	Mark Edens and Shari Goodhartz	October 13, 1994
Torres attempts to take charge of the ExoScouts but they resent her and are eventually captured by Neo Warrior search party and Torres has to free them. Meanwhile, the Able Squad proceeds to their original destination from episode 2.22 and discovers that it is, in fact, an alien installation.
38	2.25	"Call of the Unknown"	Mark Edens and Len Wein	October 14, 1994
The Able Squad enters the alien complex and has to fight off its security systems, as well as newly arrived Typhonus' troops. As soon as they finally manage to find their way out, the facility starts emitting undecipherable radio signals.
39	2.26	"Heart of Mars"	Mark Edens; Ted Pedersen and Francis Moss	October 17, 1994
Both Terrans and Neosapiens decide to seize the alien technology for themselves and enter the complex again. When a battle breaks out inside, the installation takes critical damage and self-destructs, destabilizing the Martian lithosphere. Able Squad (including Torres and her scouts) barely escapes the planet as it is literally blown to pieces.
40	2.27	"Winged Fury"	Mark Edens and Richard Mueller	October 18, 1994
Marsh and Marsala are shot down above New York and Marsala is captured by Neo Megas. Marsh is chased by Neo Warriors but receives help from local taxi driver Sidney. After a third-generation winged Neo Warrior kidnaps Sidney, Marsh has to outfly him in his damaged E-frame to save his benefactor.
41	2.28	"Night of the Traitor"	Mark Edens; Hans Biemler and Richard Manning	October 19, 1994
Neo Megas team up with Marsala to kidnap Phaeton and, thus, stop the war. As the Resistance discovers and storms Phaeton's recently built bunker in Phaeton City, Marsala confronts him in person but Phaeton is able to escape using abilities he acquired due to Automutation Syndrome. Discovering their treachery, Phaeton orders all Neo Megas in existence (save Galba) wiped out.
42	2.29	"Trial by Combat"	Mark Edens and Katherine Huston	October 20, 1994
Exofleet's attack on a Neo breeding facility in Antarctica ends in a slaughter which only Yuri Stavrogan survives. Able Squad moves in but J.T. Marsh is soon captured by Neo Warriors and pretends to be Kaz Takagi to avoid unnecessary attention. Neosapiens return him his E-frame and pit against a newly created Neo Lord to test the latter's abilities.
43	2.30	"The Perfect Warrior"	Mark Edens and Brooks Wachtel	October 21, 1994
With Galba's help, Marsh reunites with his squad and leads them and the jumptroops to attack the breeding complex. Chased by Neo Lords, he manages to enter the geothermal processing plant and destroys it along with the rest of the facility and all Neo Lords bred up to date.
44	2.31	"The Price of Courage"	Mark Edens and Matthew Edens	October 24, 1994
Phaeton orders his best General Shiva to gather the remnants of the Neosapien fleet and retake Venus from the Terrans. Seeing through Winfield's tactics, Shiva attacks Venus but takes heavy losses and is eventually shot down himself. He is then captured by the group of ExoScouts first seen in episode 2.23 but dies of his wounds before they get him to a medic.
45	2.32	"Dark River"	Mark Edens; Karen Wilson and Chris Weber	October 25, 1994
Able Squad lands in the vicinity of Manaus in Amazon Basin to extract Dr. Albrecht Ketzer, a genius geneticist who, they hope, can discover weaknesses in Neo Lords' genetic structure. Ketzer, however, is unwilling to cooperate, as he is more interested in his eugenical experiments, and even infuses Nara Burns with an unknown mutating agent before disappearing.
46	2.33	"The Art of War"	Mark Edens and Shari Goodhartz	October 26, 1994
Bronski and Takagi deliver explosives to Alaska and cooperate with local Resistance under Eve Hanley's command to plant them on a Neosapien transport train to Great Slave Lake. They soon discover that the train carries countless works of Terran art, which they manage to save before Neosapiens notice them. The Great Slave Lake facility is seemingly destroyed.
47	2.34	"One Small Step" "The Fall of the Neosapien Empire Part 1"	Mark Edens; Rolf Steiner, J.F. Sebastian, and Paul Lazarro	October 27, 1994
Exofleet attacks the Moon and Phaeton throws all forces available on Earth to defend it. The battle slowly turns in Neosapiens' favor until Alec DeLeon kills Typhonus, himself mortally wounded, and uses the General's E-frame to announce that the Moon is lost. Most of the Neosapien E-frames self-destruct and DeLeon dies soon thereafter.
48	2.35	"Fifth Column" "The Fall of the Neosapien Empire Part 2"	Mark Edens; Ted Pedersen and Francis Moss	October 28, 1994
Winfield orders all Resistance cells on Earth to attack Neosapiens at once and Napier's group manages to seize a factory worth of Neosapien heavy tanks. They proceed to Phaeton City but are pinned down at the Battle Creek. Meanwhile, Galba learns about Phaeton's doomsday device and attempts to warn Exofleet but is captured. The liberation of Earth begins.
49	2.36	"The Last Jump" "The Fall of the Neosapien Empire Part 3"	Mark Edens and Jeff Gillette	October 31, 1994
Able Squad and C5 Jumptroop Squadron land in Washington, D.C. but Marsh's team is soon recalled to go after Phaeton's doomsday device at the Great Slave Lake. Meanwhile, the jumptroops are overwhelmed without proper E-frame support and have to be rescued by Bronsky in Winfield's personal shuttle. Capt. Avery Butler is severely wounded and passes command to Colleen O'Reilly.
50	2.37	"The Night Before Doomsday" "The Fall of the Neosapien Empire Part 4"	Mark Edens and Nick Sagan	November 1, 1994
Able Squad locates the facility where the doomsday device was built but it has been already transported to Phaeton City. They are ambushed by Neosapiens, resulting in Stavrogan's death and Marsh's captivity, and the latter is taken directly to Phaeton. Thrax disbands his Manausian garrison and is detained for execution by Neo Lords.
51	2.38	"Abandon Hope" "The Fall of the Neosapien Empire Part 5"	Mark Edens and Matthew Edens	November 2, 1994
Phaeton informs Marsh of his plans to destroy the Earth but discovers that his most trusted General Livia sabotaged the doomsday device. This delay is just enough for E-frames and jumptroops to enter his bunker, where Nara Burns uses her mutated body's abilities to first paralyze and then kill Phaeton.
52	2.39	"Beyond Chaos"	Mark Edens	November 3, 1994
The Neosapien War is over and Neosapiens are surrendering all over the Solar system. Burns' mutation progresses even further. DeLeon is resurrected through combination of Neo Mega cloning technology and Algernon's mind-machine interface. Marsala convinces the Homeworlds Congress to create a final brood of Neosapiens capable of sexual reproduction. Mars is reconstructed with GRAF technology. Marsh travels to Chaos to help dismantling the Pirate base there and witnesses it being attacked by presumably alien vessels (from episode "Call of the Unknown") and disappearing into thin space. He then follows the aliens as they make their way to the Inner Planets.
