= Mort the Chicken =

2000 video game

- North America cover art
- Developer: AndNow
- Publisher: Crave Entertainment: EU: Ubi Soft
- Platform: PlayStation
- Release: NA: November 30, 2000; EU: January 19, 2001
- Genre: Platform
- Mode: Single-player

Mort the Chicken is a platform video game developed by American studio AndNow and published by Crave Entertainment for the PlayStation. Ubi Soft co-published the game in Europe.

== Plot ==
In a universe where chickens are the dominant species, Mort the Chicken stars in his own television show. However, in an alternate universe, cube-like creatures called The Boolyon are spying on them. Their leader, General Cubicles, notices that the chickens have stacks of hay, but mistakes them for kidnapped citizens of their universe; in retaliation, he launches an invasion of the chickens' universe through a well, and the Boolyon kidnap the baby chicks, scattering them across the Boolyon's universe. Mort, being the only one brave enough to stop the cubes, jumps down the well and starts his adventure to save the baby chicks.

== Gameplay ==
Mort the Chicken is a relatively straightforward platformer. The player controls Mort as he explores his universe, rescuing baby chicks and killing cubes. Mort can destroy the cubes using the comb on his head, which can be used as a whip. Some cubes cannot be killed, and every time Mort takes a hit, the cubes steal a chick from Mort and imprison it. Mort's health bar is shown by two stalks of corn, and when Mort loses health, part of the corn disappears. Each level has up to ten chicks to rescue. Mort can also gain power-ups. These power-ups include making him jump higher, become giant, attract chicks, extend his neck-whip attack, or have chicks attack enemies. Eggs and chicken food are scattered across the levels, and Mort can peck at these with his beak. Eggs give Mort power-ups and chicken food restores health.

== Reception ==
Reception

Review scores
Publication	Score
AllGame	3/5
IGN	2.5/10
M! Games	53%
MeriStation	2.3/10
Official U.S. PlayStation Magazine	1.5/5
Video Games (DE)	48%
Vandal	3/10

Mort the Chicken received unfavorable reviews.

== Legacy ==
Mort is featured in the 2023 game Pizza Tower as a power-up in the stage "Fun Farm", allowing the player to double jump, attack enemies and launch themselves from hooks. Ed Annunziata, the creator of the character, gave permission for the character to be used in the game when asked by the creator of Pizza Tower, McPig.
