= Tiny Tank =

1999 video game

Tiny Tank: Up Your Arsenal
- Developers: Appaloosa Interactive; AndNow
- Publisher: Sony Computer Entertainment
- Director: Ian McGee
- Producers: Mark Harwood; Jason Friedman
- Designer: Douglas Eidsmore
- Artist: Raphael Reyes
- Writer: E. Ettore Annunziata
- Engine: Diesel Power
- Platform: PlayStation
- Release: NA: August 31, 1999; PAL: February 4, 2000
- Genres: Platformer, Third-person shooter
- Modes: Single-player, multiplayer

Tiny Tank (marketed as Tiny Tank: Up Your Arsenal) is a 1999 platformer-third-person shooter video game developed by AndNow and Appaloosa Interactive and published by Sony Computer Entertainment for the PlayStation. Initially to be published by MGM Interactive in late 1998, they sold the rights of the game to Sony while retaining a producer credit.

In the game, the armed forces of planet Earth were merged into a large corporation during the 21st century. The company decided to create a robot army to fight humanity's wars instead of human soldiers. It also created the sentient tank Tiny Tank as a company mascot to boost its own popularity. In 2098, Tiny was supposed to face the rest of the company's army in an exhibition match. Due to a series of errors, Tiny was destroyed during the match, and a robotic opponent gained both self-awareness and control over the other robots. The new leader decided to cause human extinction, forcing his human enemies to retreat into underground shelters. In 2198, Tiny is revived and tasked with defeating the robot army and becoming humanity's latest savior.

== Gameplay ==
The player controls Tiny as he traverses many levels, eliminating SenTrax forces as he goes. There are two bars at the top of the screen that show Tiny's health and the amount of nanometal acquired. Nanometal is essential for the on-board Fix-It Crabs to repair Tiny. If the nanometal meter runs out, health cannot be regenerated. There is also a map on the upper right hand corner identifying the surroundings, enemies, and mission objectives.

Tiny can pick up fallen parts from destroyed enemies:

- Positronic Brains (P-Brains) - A robot's artificial intelligence system. Can be used to improve and upgrade equipped weapons.
- Weapons - Fallen weapons can be attached to Tiny's four weapon hardpoints.
- Debris (Nanometal) - Essential for the on-board Fix-It Crabs to repair Tiny.

There are also other upgrades that are placed around the levels themselves that can be acquired:

- Invulnerability - Temporary invulnerability.
- Nanometal - Essential for the on-board Fix-It Crabs to repair Tiny, but these possess much more material than enemy debris does. Appears as a gray rectangular container.

Tiny also has deployable "Teeny Weeny Tanks", even smaller versions of himself that can be manually controlled or set to hunt enemies, gather upgrades, or protect Tiny.

== Plot ==
The game's plot takes place in sometime before 2098 A.D., all of Earth's armed forces were disintegrated into one large corporation, SenTrax. SenTrax vowed to create a robot army to fight humanity's wars, so mankind itself would not have to. However, they needed the peoples' vote to set this plan into motion, and thus developed the titular "Tiny Tank" - a small orange tank with an occasionally unfriendly attitude. The creation of this cute killing machine made SenTrax's popularity skyrocket, and won them the vote. As thanks, the corporation set up an exhibition showing their orange mascot fighting off the entire SenTrax army on July 4, 2098, broadcast live over the Internet. However, when the rehearsal began, one of the SenTrax robots had been accidentally fitted with live ammunition and destroyed Tiny with one shot. As a result, Tiny's "positronic brain" (his artificial intelligence system) shattered, and its shards gave "life" to the entire robot army. The robot that had fired the shot, now self-aware and calling himself Mutank, took control of the rampant robots and began to eliminate humanity so that machines could thrive. Humanity was forced to evacuate into underground asteroid shelters as the mechanical army conquered the surface.

But then on July 4, 2198 A.D., which was 100 years later, Tiny Tank was finally restored by automated SenTrax Fix-It Crabs, which were minuscule robots made to repair damaged machinery. Also as a result, a female artificial intelligence on board an orbital satellite reawakened Tiny, sent him to fight Mutank's robot army and save mankind once again, and gave him his mission briefing for his spying assignments to thwart the criminal conspiracy Mutank and his hitmen have started.

== Development ==
The game was in development as early as April 1998, when it was picked up by MGM Interactive. AndNow founder Ed Annunziata had previously worked with Appaloosa Interactive on Ecco The Dolphin when he was at Sega. Sony acquired the rights to the game after the game had missed its planned release date in 1998.

== Reception ==
Reception

Review scores
| Publication | Score |
|---|---|
| AllGame | 2.5/5 |
| CNET Gamecenter | 7/10 |
| EP Daily | 8/10 |
| Game Informer | 5.5/10 |
| GameFan | (1/99) 89% (10/99) 80% |
| GamePro | (B.F.) 4.5/5 (iBot) 4/5 |
| GameRevolution | B |
| IGN | 6.8/10 |
| Jeuxvideo.com | 13/20 |
| Next Generation | 4/5 |
| PlayStation Official Magazine – UK | 6/10 |
| Official U.S. PlayStation Magazine | (1/99) 2.5/5 (10/99) 2/5 |

Many magazines gave early positive reviews while the game was still in development before Sony stepped in. Next Generation, for example, said that the game "succeeds in what it sets out to accomplish, both [in] its humor and its gameplay." After release, however, reviews were mixed.
