= Ecco Jr. =

1995 video game

- Developer: Novotrade
- Publisher: Sega
- Producers: E. Ettore Annunziata; Marianne Arotzarena
- Programmers: József Bánsági; László Zsiga
- Artist: Eszter Páris
- Composers: Andy Armer; Gábor Foltán; László Fazekas
- Series: Ecco the Dolphin
- Platform: Sega Genesis
- Release: NA: April 1995; AU: 1995
- Genres: Adventure, Action-adventure
- Mode: Single-player

Ecco Jr. is a video game in the Ecco the Dolphin series, released by Sega in 1995. It has the controls and basic gameplay of the other two Mega Drive/Genesis titles, but is geared towards younger players, lacking the high difficulty of Ecco the Dolphin and Ecco: The Tides of Time.

== Gameplay ==
In this game, a younger version of Ecco goes to see Big Blue, an ancient blue whale, completing tasks such as herding seahorses, swimming through rings, and finding lost balls for sea lions along the way. The gameplay is similar to the other Ecco the Dolphin games, but mainly revolves around using these abilities for solving simple puzzles and problems. One key difference is that the player character cannot drown by staying underwater too long. Likewise, there are no enemies to attack the player character. Two other playable characters were introduced: Tara the baby orca (there is also a bottlenose dolphin character named Tara in Ecco: The Tides of Time) and Kitnee the young Atlantic dolphin, who is darker gray than Ecco. The player can switch characters at any time.

Ecco Jr. features a password system, though all the passwords are included in the instruction manual. Ecco Jr. also features a "Parent's Menu" that includes a difficulty settings menu, level selection option, and facts about real dolphins.

== Release ==
A follow-up to this title, called Ecco Jr. and the Great Ocean Treasure Hunt!, was also available on the Sega Pico.

Ecco Jr. was released on the Sega Mega Drive in Australia, the only PAL version of the game released on cartridge. In Japan the game was only released on the Sega Channel on August 16, 1995. The game made its European debut on February 2, 2007, on the Sega Genesis Collection for PlayStation 2 and PSP. Ecco Jr. was also made available on the Wii's Virtual Console on November 6, 2007, in Japan, November 26, 2007, in North America and August 8, 2008, in Europe. The game was also released on Steam on September 13, 2010.

== Reception ==
Upon release, GamePro gave the game a rave review, commenting that "all the creatures and background scenery have the same breathtaking visual appeal of the grown-up Ecco adventures". They particularly approved of how the game, unlike previous games in the series, is accessible to younger players.

Electronic Games gave the game an A, praising the graphics, music, and sound effects.

A reviewer for Next Generation, gave it two out of five stars, commenting that "to Ecco Jr.'s credit, it has some beautiful graphics and simplistic gameplay that'll be an easy play for the youngest of gamers. However, this game is nothing more than a way for Sega to dig its claws into the impressionable minds of young children and make them believe they need to graduate to the first (and more original) Ecco".
