= Star Trek: Deep Space Nine – Crossroads of Time =

1995 video game

- Super NES version cover art
- Developer: Novotrade International
- Publishers: NA: Playmates Interactive Entertainment; EU: Virgin Interactive Entertainment
- Designers: Maurice Molyneaux; András Császár; Gergely Csaszar; Kadocsa Tassonyi; David A. Luehmann
- Programmers: László Szungyi; Tamás Jutasi
- Artists: Zoltán Tóth; Gábor Markó; Mihály Herényi
- Composers: Attila Dobos; Attila Héger; Gabor Kis; András Magyari; Steve Zuckermann
- Series: Star Trek
- Platforms: Sega Genesis; Super NES
- Release: Super NES: NA: September 1995; EU: May 15, 1996; Sega Genesis: NA: 1995; EU: May 15, 1996
- Genre: Action-adventure
- Mode: Single-player

Star Trek: Deep Space Nine – Crossroads of Time is a 1995 action-adventure video game for the Genesis and Super NES platforms, based on the television series Star Trek: Deep Space Nine. Critics praised the game's authentic recreation of the look and feel of the TV series, but often criticized its gameplay as repetitive and clunky.

== Gameplay ==
The player controls a member of the Deep Space Nine crew, mostly Captain Benjamin Sisko, but also Doctor Julian Bashir, Major Kira Nerys and Odo. Most of the game's levels are cinematic platformers: one is a horizontal-scrolling shooter. Platform levels are of two types: 'adventure' levels and 'action' levels. In 'adventure' levels, the player character moves around Deep Space Nine, talking with NPCs and ultimately reaching a certain point in the plot. In 'action' levels, the player wanders the level in the cinematic platformer style, climbing ledges, fighting enemies with a phaser and finding and using items, with the ultimate goal of fulfilling a certain mission, sometimes within a time limit.

== Reception ==
Crossroads of Time

Aggregate score
Aggregator	Score
GameRankings	66% (SNES)

Review scores
Publication	Score
Electronic Gaming Monthly	7/10 (SNES); 7/10 (Genesis)
Next Generation	2/5 (SNES); 1/5 (Genesis)

Reviewing the Genesis version, GamePro stated: "Despite DS9's remarkable graphics and authentic Trekkie atmosphere, its simple, repetitive action will attract only puzzle fiends and devotees of the TV show." They elaborated that the puzzles are time-consuming, every conflict can be won just by crouching and shooting, and that players must view the same conversations every time their character dies. A different GamePro critic reviewed the SNES version. He criticized the clunky controls and the repetitive and visually similar levels, but also remarked that the authentic Deep Space Nine look and spirit would make the game enjoyable for fans of the show. A reviewer for Next Generation complimented the game's story and faithfulness to the source material, but concluded that the slow pace, unclear objectives and muddy graphics make it "Recommended only for undiscriminating fans." The four reviewers of Electronic Gaming Monthly gave the game a positive review. Two of them criticized that the pace is too slow, but all four praised the backgrounds and character sprites as reproducing the look of the TV show with great attention to detail, and they emphasized that fans of the show should try the game. Though they remarked that the graphics are not as good in the Genesis version, all four reviewers gave the two versions identical scores.

Next Generation reviewed the Genesis version of the game, and stated: "This game is boring and will only be of minor interest to Deep Space Nine freaks."
