= Jaws Unleashed =

2006 video game

- Developer: Appaloosa Interactive
- Publisher: Majesco
- Composers: Jason Graves; Cris Velasco; Tommy Tallarico
- Platforms: PlayStation 2; Xbox; Microsoft Windows
- Release: NA: May 23, 2006; EU: September 22, 2006 (PC); NA: October 18, 2006 (PC); EU: October 20, 2006; AU: October 26, 2006
- Genre: Action-adventure
- Mode: Single player

Jaws Unleashed is a 2006 action-adventure video game inspired by the 1975 film Jaws. It was developed by Appaloosa Interactive and published by Majesco. This game features open world gameplay, with the player assuming control of a large male great white shark and being able to roam freely throughout the water, eating other animals and humans, while destroying everything in its path. Jaws Unleashed was released for Microsoft Windows, Xbox and PlayStation 2.

== Gameplay ==
In Jaws: Unleashed, the player assumes the role of the shark. The shark first enters the island from the southern end and finds itself in a cove. The cove has tutorials to allow the player to become familiar with the controls, such as the ones for moving the shark and attacking other creatures. The shark has a menu for upgrades as well. These can be accessed from either the main menu or the pause menu. Upgrade points are earned by causing destruction around Amity Island (in levels and in free-roam mode), completing levels, and/or collecting bonus items, the most frequently found of which being treasure chests. There are numerous upgrade criteria to choose from. Players can choose to upgrade the shark's power, speed, hunger, health, or accuracy.

During gameplay, there is a HUD in the lower-right corner of the screen. This HUD has four meters and a sonar that informs players of the positions of important objects, prey, and enemies. The two parallel meters above the sonar are for the shark's health (right side, red-colored), and hunger (left side, green-colored). As the shark becomes hungry, its health will diminish, forcing the player to "eat" constantly. The health bar will also diminish as the shark takes damage. The last two meters are used to charge the shark's tail-whip and head-butt attacks. The more each meter fills, the stronger the attack is. The meters are on the left quadrant of the sonar, running along the arc with the head-butt meter on the outside and the tail-whip meter on the inside. The head-butt meter is orange when charging, flashing when fully charged, and is the same as the tail-whip meter, but it is purple instead of orange.

The shark has unique attacks in its arsenal. The shark can ram objects with its snout, whip enemies with its caudal tail, bite, and when the player earns enough points to upgrade their abilities, new attacks become unlocked, such as the "corkscrew" and the "body bomb". To perform a corkscrew attack, the player must charge up the head-butt meter and tail-whip meter; head-butt first, then release the tail-whip button and the shark will spin around, causing damage to anything caught in its wake. To perform a body-bomb, they simply charge the head-butt meter, point the shark upward, release the movement button and the shark will fly up in the air, and smash back down.

== Plot ==
30 years after the events of the first film, Amity Island is growing, making corporate connections with prestigious companies like Environplus to improve the island's economy. The increased population around the island and industrial activity has also attracted the Earth's most fearsome creature and the game's main character: an enormous, 35 ft (11 m) male great white shark. When the son of Environplus CEO Steven Shaw is eaten by the ferocious beast, Shaw hires renowned shark hunter Cruz Raddock to track down and kill the shark. Meanwhile, marine biologist Michael Brody tries to capture the shark for research. Players are introduced to the controls and abilities of the shark in a tutorial, where the player kills several divers, learns to attack swimmers at a beach, and must destroy a set of docks. Brody shows up at this point, captures the shark, and transports it to Amity's marine theme park, similar to SeaWorld.

The shark is put in a holding tank, where Brody, Vaughn Jr., and Shaw argue about what to do with the shark. Shaw wants the shark to be killed, as it killed his son and is endangering the beaches, whereas Mayor Vaughn wants to put it on display for tourists. After they leave, the shark escapes from its holding tank and destroys the waterpark. In one of the exhibit tanks, the shark kills the resident orca. After this, the player is free to roam.

Brody tells the mayor that his research has discovered that the subsonic frequencies emitted by Environplus's Seaseeker submarines are causing the sharks around Amity to become more aggressive and attack humans. The mayor brushes off Brody's advice and insists on keeping the submarines.

Reception

Aggregate score
| Aggregator | Score | | |
| Aggregator | PC | PS2 | Xbox |
|---|---|---|---|
| Metacritic | 55/100 | 52/100 | 51/100 |

Review scores
| Publication | Score | | |
| Publication | PC | PS2 | Xbox |
|---|---|---|---|
| Edge | N/A | 4/10 | 4/10 |
| Eurogamer | N/A | N/A | 3/10 |
| Game Informer | N/A | 4.75/10 | 4.75/10 |
| GamePro | N/A | 2.75/5 | 2.75/5 |
| GameRevolution | N/A | D− | D− |
| GameSpot | 3.8/10 | 3.8/10 | 3.8/10 |
| GameSpy | N/A | 2/5 | 2/5 |
| GameZone | N/A | 4.5/10 | 6.9/10 |
| IGN | 6.1/10 | 7.4/10 | 7.4/10 |
| Official U.S. PlayStation Magazine | N/A | 1.5/5 | N/A |
| Official Xbox Magazine (US) | N/A | N/A | 6.5/10 |
| PC Gamer (US) | 71% | N/A | N/A |
| The A.V. Club | N/A | D+ | D+ |

The shark finds its way into a beach party in the middle of the night and attacks the swimmers. When a truck starts throwing explosive barrels in the water, the shark grabs one and throws it at a pipe line filled with oil. The barrel explodes, causing a chain reaction as the oil ignites that causes the entire Environplus refinery to catch fire and collapse into the ocean. After this, it causes more carnage, such as destroying an underwater facility, destroying an oil shipment, and killing Shaw and Mayor Vaughn by ramming his yacht into a barge filled with fireworks. Seeing this as the last straw, Cruz sets to blow up the shark, but he is killed when his boat is destroyed. Brody drops a bomb over the wreckage of Cruz's boat, The Orca II. Assuming that the shark is dead, Brody, aboard the Coast Guard helicopter, flies away, but the shark is revealed to be alive and begins to follow the helicopter.

== Reception ==
Jaws Unleashed received "mixed" reviews on all platforms, according to the review aggregation website Metacritic. Most complaints center around the game's glitches, freezes and camera problems.

Despite this, the game was a commercial success, selling over 250,000 copies on Xbox alone, therefore earning it GameSpot's "Worst Game Everyone Played of 2006" award.
