= Three Dirty Dwarves =

1996 video game

- North American Saturn cover art
- Developer: Appaloosa Interactive
- Publisher: SegaSoft
- Director: László Szenttornyai
- Producer: Jason Friedman
- Designer: Ed Annunziata
- Programmers: Balázs Makó; Ferenc Staengler; Kadocsa Tassonyi
- Artists: Gábor Adonyi; Gábor Markó; Nándor Orbán
- Writer: Merle Kessler
- Composers: András Magyari; Attila Dobos; Attila Héger
- Platforms: Microsoft Windows; Sega Saturn
- Release: Saturn: NA: 27 September 1996; EU: 3 April 1997; JP: 30 May 1997; Windows: NA: 1996
- Genre: Beat 'em up
- Modes: Single-player, multiplayer (Only on Sega Saturn)

Three Dirty Dwarves is a 1996 beat 'em up video game developed by Appaloosa Interactive and published by Sega for their Sega Saturn console. It was later ported to Windows.

Even before its release on the Saturn, SegaSoft announced that Three Dirty Dwarves would be the first game they would publish for the PlayStation once they acquired a PlayStation software license. This release never materialized, however.

== Gameplay ==
Gameplay screenshot from the Sega Saturn version.

Most levels in Three Dirty Dwarves play in a typical beat 'em up format: players must advance the characters to the end of the stage, defeating any enemies which block the way. Up to three players take control of the three titular dwarves, with each player controlling one dwarf at a time; if there are fewer than three players, the player(s) can change which dwarf they are controlling at any time. A single hit from an enemy or obstacle will render a dwarf unconscious, but if another dwarf is still in action he can revive an unconscious dwarf by attacking him, effectively slapping him awake.

Each dwarf has a short-range attack and a long-range attack, though the speed and responsiveness of each attack varies according to the dwarf. In addition, the dwarves can spend skulls to activate special team attacks, such as starting a fight with each other or morphing into one of three huge gestalt dwarves. Skulls are acquired by picking them up from fallen enemies or breaking open boxes.

== Story ==
Four children genetically engineered by the army grow up to be child geniuses instead of perfect soldiers, prompting General Briggs to use them to manufacture weaponry.

To escape, the children play their favorite role-playing game and lead the party - a trio of slow-witted but heroic dwarves - to a gateway into the real world. The dwarves' equipment burns up during atmospheric entry. They land in a sporting goods store and make use of the equipment inside for their weapons and armor. The monsters from the role-playing game world have followed the dwarves into the real world, and the dwarves must battle their way through them to find the children and confront General Briggs.

After the dwarves defeat Briggs' subordinate Barney and get past the army bases' automated defenses, Briggs offers them jobs in the army with generous benefits. The dwarves are on the verge of taking the offer, so the children roll the die for their role-playing game until the right number comes up, forcing the dwarves to turn down Briggs' offer and insist on the children's release. Briggs complies, but the dwarves proceed to beat him up anyway. The children use the distraction to sneak off of the base to freedom.

== Reception ==
Reception

Review scores
Publication	Score
Electronic Gaming Monthly	7.5/10 (SAT)
Next Generation	3/5 (SAT)
Sega Saturn Magazine	65% (SAT)

The Sega Saturn version received moderately positive reviews, with most critics praising the game's humor and personality. The four reviewers of Electronic Gaming Monthly especially praised the comic weirdness of the cutscenes and the general fun of the game. A Next Generation critic remarked that the side-scrolling beat 'em up genre was becoming tired, but that Three Dirty Dwarves, while not genuinely innovative, "offers just enough new spins on the tradition to make it a worthwhile venture." He found the varied and often surprising levels and the consistently solid challenge to be key. Major Mike of GamePro said the jumping and three-dimensional gameplay can be awkward, but aspects such as the three-player mode and humor "make this game something special." Rob Allsetter of Sega Saturn Magazine gave Three Dirty Dwarves one of its few negative reviews, calling it "a very irritating and mundane platform game". He lambasted the game's humor and said the gameplay is repetitive.
