= Exosquad (video game) =

1995 video game

- Developer: Novotrade
- Publishers: NA: Playmates Interactive Entertainment; EU: Virgin Interactive Entertainment
- Platform: Sega Genesis
- Release: NA: July 1, 1995; EU: September 1995
- Genre: Various
- Mode: Single-player

Exosquad is a Sega Genesis video game based on the animated television series under the same title and developed by Novotrade.

== Gameplay ==
The title screen

The player alternatively assumes the roles of three members of the Able Squad: Lt. J.T. Marsh, Sgt. Rita Torres and Wolf Bronsky. Depending on the character, the gameplay alternates between "a shooter, a platformer, and a fighting game" genres.

== Reception ==
Exosquad was negatively received by critics. GamePro gave the game a mostly negative review, saying that the three different gameplay styles provide variety but all have major issues; for the space-shooter levels, detecting oncoming meteorites and Neo missiles is tough because of the star-studded backgrounds; for the ground attacks, they are a slowly moving breeze and the player's E-Frame lumbers along the landscape to eliminate equally "pokey" enemies; and the one-on-one fighting offers, according to reviewer, an "intriguing mix of air-to-air, surface-to-air, and air-to-surface attacks", but they are frustrating because of bad controls. They also argued that the game is much too difficult for the young audiences of the TV show. A reviewer for Next Generation gave it one out of five stars, saying that the controls are unacceptably poor and the use of separate sprites for each of the characters' segments results in "gangly" and awkward animations. The four reviewers of Electronic Gaming Monthly complimented the cinematic intro but otherwise panned the game, saying that the controls were poor, the graphics were outdated, and the developers had divided their attentions between several different gameplay styles without doing a good job with any of them. They gave it a score of 3.75 out of 10.
