= Ecco the Dolphin (video game) =

1992 video game

- North American box art by Boris Vallejo
- Developer: Novotrade International (Note: Game Boy Advance port for Sega Smash Pack by CodeFire, Xbox 360 port by Backbone Entertainment)
- Publisher: Sega
- Directors: László Szenttornyai; László Mérő (Game Gear)
- Producers: E. Ettore Annunziata; Jerry Markota (Game Gear)
- Designers: E. Ettore Annunziata; László Szenttornyai
- Programmers: Mega Drive, CD; József Molnár; Mihály Brudnyák; Fox; Game Gear; Attila Bús; Balázs Pápai
- Artists: Mega Drive, CD; Zsolt Balogh; Game Gear; Eszter Páris
- Composers: Mega Drive, CD; Spencer Nilsen; Brian Coburn; Game Gear; Csaba Gigor; Gábor Foltán
- Series: Ecco The Dolphin
- Platforms: Mega Drive/Genesis: Sega CD; Windows; Game Gear; Master System; Game Boy Advance (Note: Sega Smash Pack (2002)); Nintendo 3DS
- Release: December 1992: Mega Drive/Genesis; NA: December 1992; EU: January 1993; JP: July 30, 1993; Sega CD; NA: 1993; EU: August 1993; JP: February 24, 1995; Game Gear; EU: October 1993; NA: November 1993; JP: March 11, 1994; Master System; PAL: August 24, 1994; Windows; NA: November 1995; EU: February 1996; JP: December 13, 1996; iOS; WW: July 22, 2010; Nintendo 3DS 3D Classics; JP: June 26, 2013; WW: December 12, 2013
- Genre: Action-adventure
- Mode: Single-player

Ecco the Dolphin is an action-adventure game developed by Ed Annunziata and Novotrade International and published by Sega for the Mega Drive/Genesis in 1992. Versions for the Sega CD, Master System, and Game Gear were released the following years. It is the first installment in the Ecco the Dolphin video game franchise. The player character is a bottlenose dolphin who travels through time to combat hostile extraterrestrials in Earth's oceans and on an alien spacecraft.

Ecco the Dolphin received favourable reviews and became a bestseller on the Genesis. It has been re-released several times, including on the Nintendo Virtual Console, Xbox Live Arcade, Steam, iOS, Nintendo 3DS, and the Nintendo Classics service. A sequel, Ecco: The Tides of Time, was released in 1994.

== Gameplay ==
Ecco can attack enemies by ramming into them at high speeds. Swimming can be made progressively faster by tapping a certain button, and the speed can be maintained by holding it down. Players can perform a purely aesthetic spin in the air when jumping out of the water.

Two features of the gameplay are based on actual dolphin habits: one button causes Ecco to sing, allowing him to speak with other cetaceans and interact with certain objects. The same button is used for echolocation: holding it down causes the song to return, generating a map of the area. Several levels contain enormous crystals called glyphs, which respond in different ways if Ecco touches or sings to them. Some block paths, and a "key-glyph" must be found in such cases to pass. Others give information, and a few in later levels replenish health/air and give Ecco temporary invulnerability.

Additionally, Ecco, being a mammal, must surface periodically for air or find an air vent. If the "air meter" runs out, Ecco loses health rapidly, which represents drowning. His health is measured by a separate meter (above the air meter) which is depleted by enemies or when his air meter runs out and can be recharged by eating fish, "singing" to clams, or, later in the game, singing to special statues or glyphs. Ecco's song can be optionally upgraded at two points in the game: one upgrade allows Ecco's song to be used in combination with a charge as a long-range weapon, and the other temporarily disorients sharks and makes minor enemies freeze temporarily. Touching an enemy by any means other than an attack causes Ecco to sustain damage. The enemies range from seahorses to giant octopods.

== Plot ==
The game opens with Ecco, a bottlenose dolphin, as he and his pod are swimming in their home bay. A podmate challenges Ecco to a game to see how high he can jump into the air. When he is in the air, a giant waterspout forms and sucks up all marine life in the bay except Ecco, leaving him alone in the bay. Upon leaving the bay, Ecco swims around meeting other marine life including other dolphins who tell them they have felt the storm and the entire ocean is in chaos. An orca that Ecco encounters tells him to travel to the Arctic to meet the "Big Blue", an ancient blue whale revered by marine life for his age and wisdom, who might be able to help Ecco on his journey. Arriving in the Arctic after a long journey through the ocean, Ecco finds the Big Blue, who says that the storms occur every 500 years. Though the Big Blue doesn't know what causes the storms, he suggests that Ecco should seek the Asterite, the oldest life form on Earth. Acting on this advice, Ecco leaves the Arctic and travels to a deep-sea cavern, where he finds the Asterite. To his dismay, though the Asterite would otherwise have the power to aid Ecco, it currently can't, as some orbs from its body were lost a long time ago. The Asterite tells Ecco to go to the sunken ruins of the city of Atlantis, where he can use the time machine left behind by the Atlanteans to retrieve the orbs.

Ecco travels to the sunken city of Atlantis, where he discovers an ancient library filled with Glyphs, giant crystals filled with information. From the library, Ecco learns about the source of the storms: an alien race known as the Vortex lost the ability to produce food on their planet. According to the texts, when the planets align once every 500 years, the Vortex use their technology to harvest from the waters of Earth. The Atlanteans fought a long war with the Vortex, which only ended when the Vortex fired a beam at Atlantis, sending the city into the depths of the ocean. Learning this, Ecco activates the time machine and travels 55 million years into Earth's past. While Ecco is in the past he learns an ancient song to communicate with a Pteranodon. Ecco locates the Asterite in the past but is immediately attacked by it. Forced into battle, he manages to dislodge a globe from it. This opens a time portal and he is sent back into the present. After receiving the globe, the Asterite grants him the power to turn his sonar into a deadly weapon against the Vortex, as well as the abilities to breathe underwater and to slowly regenerate lost health. The Asterite instructs him to use the time machine to travel back in time to the hour of the harvest. This time he manages to be sucked into the waterspout with his pod. Ecco is sent flying through outer space to a giant tube-like machine. Making his way through the construct Ecco arrives on the planet Vortex engaging the aliens in combat. He makes his way to the Vortex Queen and engages her in a fight. When the Queen is defeated, she spits out Ecco's pod, and the dolphins make their collective escape back to Earth.

== Development ==
The existence of Ecco the Dolphin had been heavily rumored throughout the industry before it was finally revealed by Sega in 1992 as a Mega Drive/Genesis exclusive, then simply known as Dolphin. After deciding to create a game based around dolphins, developer Ed Annunziata carried out research on the subject and was particularly inspired by the book Sounding by Hank Searls, which explained how the creatures use echolocation. Annunziata worked with the music team on the soundtrack, playing them songs by Pink Floyd to illustrate the feeling he was aiming for. Annunziata later said, "I was paranoid about game rentals and kids beating the game over the weekend. So... I... uh... made it hard". His favourite level was "Welcome to the Machine", which was "way over the top challenging".

Annunziata had considered naming the character after the constellation Delphinus, which is depicted on the character's forehead. But Sega's director of marketing Al Nilsen suggested the name Botticelli the Dolphin, citing the popularity of characters named after Italian artists, like the Teenage Mutant Ninja Turtles. Panicked, Annunziata turned to his boss Clyde Grossman who suggested Echo, which alluded to the dolphin's echolocation ability. Annunziata loved the idea. Being of Italian descent, he chose the spelling Ecco, because it can loosely mean "I see" in that language, and "seeing with sound" is what echolocation enables dolphins to do. One journalist for Vice theorized that the name could have come from the writings of John C. Lilly, who wrote about an alien organization called the Earth Coincidence Control Office or E.C.C.O. and was also noted for his work with dolphins.

The penultimate level of the game is titled "Welcome to the Machine", named after "Welcome to the Machine", a song on Pink Floyd's 1975 studio album Wish You Were Here. Ecco: The Tides of Time (1994) features a level called "New Machine", named after "A New Machine", a two-part song on Pink Floyd's 1987 album A Momentary Lapse of Reason.

== Release ==
The Mega Drive/Genesis version of the game was released in December 1992 in North America, and then a month later in Europe. The game was ported to multiple consoles throughout the years.

Versions for the Game Gear and the Master System were also released; they feature different levels from the other versions and a special intro featuring a whale song, and dolphin noises for the title screen. The Game Gear version has a dolphin "SEGA" on the SEGA screen and dolphins laughing on the title screen, along with a new soundtrack by Csaba Gigor and Gábor Foltán, as well as a wider color gamut. An enhanced Sega CD version that features new and redesigned levels and an alternate Red Book audio soundtrack, composed by Spencer Nilsen, was also released. In Japan, the Sega CD version was only released in a compilation (along with Ecco: The Tides of Time), titled Ecco the Dolphin CD, on February 24, 1995. The Sega CD version was later ported to Windows. The Windows port was further enhanced with higher resolution graphics. In 2014 a fan-made fixed and enhanced version, dubbed Ecco PC Fixed & Enhanced Edition, became available.

In Portugal, the game's release by local Sega representatives (Ecofilmes) was accompanied by a solidarity campaign. For every unit sold, a portion of the proceeds was donated to the environmental association Quercus to support efforts to protect the bottlenose dolphin in the Sado River. Ecco the Dolphin, along with Ecco: The Tides of Time and Ecco Jr., can be found on the PlayStation 2, and PlayStation Portable game Sega Genesis Collection.

In 2002, Sega's first attempt to enter the downloadable retail game content business occurred on the digital storefront RealONE Arcade. The first few titles released included Ecco the Dolphin, Columns III, and Shinobi III. These downloadable releases came in one-hour trial versions.

Ecco the Dolphin was released in Europe and Australia for the Virtual Console on Nintendo's Wii console on December 8, 2006. It was released later in North America on November 28, and in Japan on December 2. Ecco the Dolphin was released on the Xbox Live Arcade on August 15, 2007, for the Xbox 360. Ecco the Dolphin is part of Sonic's Ultimate Genesis Collection for Xbox 360 and PlayStation 3, along with its sequel.

3D Ecco the Dolphin is a port of the game for the Nintendo 3DS as part of Sega's 3D Classics line. Along with stereoscopic 3D graphics and the option to choose between Japanese and international versions of the game, the port also adds 'Super Dolphin Mode', which decreases the difficulty by giving players invincibility and unlimited oxygen. The game was released for the Nintendo eShop in Japan on June 26 and in North America and Europe on December 12, 2013.

Ecco the Dolphin is one of the games included on both Sega Genesis Mini consoles (with the Mega Drive/Genesis cartridge version being on the first mini and the Sega CD version being on the second mini). In 1996, a soundtrack album combining music from both Ecco the Dolphin and Ecco: The Tides of Time was released, under the title Ecco: Songs of Time.

Multiple versions of Ecco the Dolphin are planned for re-release via the forthcoming Ecco the Dolphin: Complete compilation.

== Reception ==
Reception

Aggregate score
Aggregator	Score
GameRankings	76% (5 reviews)

Review scores
Publication	Score
AllGame	4.5/5 (GG); 4/5 (GEN)
Aktueller Software Markt	8/12 (SMD); 7/12 (SMS)
Beep! MegaDrive	21/40 (SGG); 32/40 (SMD)
Consoles +	90% (SGG); 88% (SMS)
Computer and Video Games	94/100; 93/100 (SGG); 96% (PC)
Electronic Gaming Monthly	31/40 (MCD); 33/40 (SMD)
Eurogamer	3/5 (WII); 3/10 (X360)
Famitsu	27/40 (MCD)
GamesMaster	90/100 (MCD); 95% (SMD)
GameSpot	6.5/10
IGN	7/10 (WII); 6/10 (X360)
Joypad	85/100 (SGG); 96% (SMD)
Mean Machines Sega	96/100 (MCD); 80% (PC); 88/100 (SGG); 97/100 (SMD); 92/100 (SMS)
Mega Fun	72/100 (MCD)
Next Generation	3/5 (PC)
Nintendo Life	6/10 (3DS); 7/10 (WII)
PC Gamer (UK)	81%
Player One	95% (MCD); 96% (SGG); 90% (SMD); 94% (SMS)
Electronic Entertainment	9/10
MegaTech	94%
Sega Magazine	92%

Award
Publication	Award
MegaTech	Hyper Game

The Sega Mega Drive version became a bestseller. In the United Kingdom, it ranked as the sixth best-selling home video game of 1993, with sales exceeding 250,000 copies. It sold over 570,000 copies worldwide. A reviewer for Next Generation called the PC release "little more than a conversion from the yesteryears of the 16-bit Sega Genesis. Except for a few video cut-scenes, there is little attempt to make this game look or play better for the PC". He nonetheless praised the game not only for its novel concept and responsive controls, but also "its smooth graphics".

Mega placed the game at No. 24 in their Top Mega Drive Games of All Time. Complex ranked Ecco the Dolphin number 44 in their "The Best 100 Sega Genesis Games". They called the game: "the most soothing puzzle-action game available on the Genesis." In 1995, Flux ranked the Sega CD version 100th on their Top 100 Video Games, they praised the game's atmosphere, eerie music, sad dolphin song and the rich underwater look, concluding: "Proof that you don't need explosions, fatalities or a celebrity endorsement to make a great game."

== See also ==
- Chuck Person's Eccojams Vol. 1, which uses a modified version of the game's artwork as its cover art
