= Wolfpack (video game) =

1990 video game

- Developer: NovaLogic
- Publisher: Broderbund Software
- Platforms: Amiga, Atari ST, MS-DOS, Mac
- Release: NA: 1990
- Genre: Submarine simulator
- Mode: Single-player

Wolfpack is a World War II submarine simulator published by Broderbund in the 1990s, for Amiga, Atari ST, MS-DOS, and Classic Mac OS. It simulates combat actions between wolf packs of German U-boats and convoys of Allied destroyers and merchant vessels in the Battle of the Atlantic.

== Gameplay ==
Submarine controls

Destroyer controls

The player can choose to command either side, the wolfpack or the convoy, with the computer controlling the enemy vessels. At any time the player may take command of any vessel in their group, including of the tankers and freighters which each carry a single gun. Each vessel can be set to remain on course or at rest, or to act under computer control while the player controls another vessel. This feature helped pave the way for many modern day real-time strategy video games.

The game allows the player to choose between different levels of tactical complexity. The player can simply command one submarine, or one a time, or issue orders and command the operations of the entire group. They can order a vessel to patrol a certain path, laid out using the mouse with the map screen, or to anchor at a certain point, or take other actions. The user can also create new missions, choosing initial locations, orders, and patrol routes for vessels on both sides.

The player can choose to run the simulation in real-time, or increase the speed by up to 64 times, allowing the ships to cross large distances in a reasonable time. The simulation automatically slows to real-time at important times such as when shots are fired.

Each mission takes place during a particular year of the war. In later years new submarine classes are available to the player, with advances such as greater underwater speed. Destroyers gain radar and active sonar for detection of submarines, and hedgehog antisubmarine weapons, to supplement the depth charges, guns and passive sonar of the earlier destroyers.

== Reception ==
Computer Gaming World gave the game two stars out of five. The magazine stated that its claim of being a "precise simulation" with "unprecedented realism" was false, as was the claim that it supported VGA graphics beyond the opening screen. The magazine concluded, "this reviewer does not consider WolfPack to have any real long-term sustainability", albeit enjoyable as a game. The magazine stated in February 1994 that the CD version was compelling because of "intriguing soundtrack", mission editor, and ease of play for newcomers, but in April 1994 said that poor graphics made Silent Service II "much preferable to this depth-charged offering".

In 1994, PC Gamer US named Wolfpack the 34th best computer game ever. The editors wrote, "There are more complicated sub sims around, but if you're looking for nail-biting excitement and an interface that lets you experience the visceral tension of the Battle of the North Atlantic, look no farther than Wolfpack on CD-ROM."

Wolfpack sold about 200,000 copies.
