= Ecco the Dolphin =

- Genre: Action-adventure
- Developer: Appaloosa Interactive
- Publisher: Sega
- Creator: Ed Annunziata
- Platforms: Sega Genesis, Sega CD, Microsoft Windows, Game Gear, Master System, Dreamcast, PlayStation 2, PlayStation Portable, Game Boy Advance, Nintendo 3DS
- First release: Ecco the Dolphin; December 1992
- Latest release: Ecco the Dolphin: Defender of the Future; 16 June 2000

Ecco the Dolphin is a series of action-adventure video games developed by Appaloosa Interactive (previously known as Novotrade International) and published by Sega.

== Premise ==
Appaloosa Interactive was founded in Hungary in 1983; the first Ecco the Dolphin game was developed by an entirely Hungarian team, originally for the European market. Ecco the Dolphin series was released in part due to Nintendo's exclusive deal with the company Capcom. In the early 1990s, Capcom signed a deal with Nintendo preventing Sega's console from carrying two popular games at the time, Street Fighter II and Final Fight. As a result, Sega created Ecco the Dolphin to develop a competitive advantage against Nintendo by having their own interactive game series. The games were originally developed for the Sega Genesis and Dreamcast video game consoles, and have been ported to numerous systems. Ed Annunziata envisioned and conceived the game, while László Szenttornyai, József Molnár, and Zsolt Balogh programmed the game. The story follows the eponymous bottlenose dolphin, who fights extraterrestrial threats to the world. The games are known for their high difficulty as well as their pacifist nature, which is common for Hungarian games. Ecco the Dolphin was seen as a continuation of the use of animal protagonists in Hungarian content.

== Games ==
Release timeline
| 1992 | Ecco the Dolphin |
1993
| 1994 | Ecco: The Tides of Time |
| 1995 | Ecco Jr. |
| 1995 | Ecco Jr. and the Great Ocean Treasure Hunt |
1996
1997
1998
1999
| 2000 | Ecco the Dolphin: Defender of the Future |

=== Ecco the Dolphin ===
Released in 1992, the original game followed the exploits of a young dolphin named Ecco as he searches the seas, and eventually time itself, for his missing pod. The game was originally developed for the European market, but localization producers such as Ryoichi Hasegawa adapted the game for the Japanese market. For example, Hasegawa adapted the Western cover for Ecco, "a macho looking dolphin", into a cute-looking dolphin.

=== Ecco: The Tides of Time ===
Released in 1994, the sequel follows Ecco's exploits after the conclusion of the original game as he travels the oceans, the past, and the future in his quest to save the planet once more.

=== Ecco Jr. ===
Released in 1995, this title was intended as edutainment and was less difficult than the previous two titles in series. Ecco Jr. demonstrates this through introducing players to echolocation as well as an introduction to marine life animals.

Ed Annuziata created this game specifically for his daughter and anyone who wanted to enjoy a game not filled with violence. Different from the other games in the series, this game does not have enemies and does not include weapons. Additionally, the puzzles players complete throughout the game are less challenging and have lower complexity making it a more simplified and accessible gameplay style. The Entertainment Software Ratings board (ESRB) rated Ecco Jr. as “E for everyone.” Ecco Jr. also includes a “Parent’s Menu” where guardians can decide the difficulty or select the level.

Unlike other games in the series, the player can switch between two other marine animals in addition to Ecco. When Ecco and his friends find out Big Blue, a wise and famous whale, is nearby, they must do favors and break crystals in order to pass the stage and find him.

The last level of Ecco Jr. is titled The Endless Sea. Singing to Big Blue will cause the whale to ascend toward the surface. After enough attempts, Big Blue will reach the top of the water and blow out of its blowhole. This signals the completion of the level and triggers the end of the game.

=== Ecco Jr. and the Great Ocean Treasure Hunt ===
A second educational title was released on the Sega Pico in 1995. In this game, Ecco and his pals explore the ocean and the ruins that lie within to find various treasures. This game distinguishes itself by utilizing stylus control for the gameplay.

=== Ecco the Dolphin: Defender of the Future ===
Released in 2000 for the Dreamcast and later ported to PlayStation 2, this title re-envisions the Ecco mythos in a new Earth with a new premise.

=== Ecco II: Sentinels of the Universe (cancelled) ===
A sequel to Defender of the Future was in development in 2001, but was cancelled due to the decline of the Dreamcast. The designer of the game, Mihaly Saranski, stated that it was designed as a "continuation of Defender of Future, but with a more coherent storyline...would have been more linear and comprehensible, instead of all that time-travel mess." Mihaly Saranski built and managed the levels, including the "3D objects, lights, rocks, plants, animals, cutscene animations, special effects, and interactions." A playable build of the game was leaked online in 2016.

=== Future ===
In a May 2025 interview, Ecco creator Ed Annunziata stated that a new Ecco game, as well as remasters of Ecco the Dolphin and Tides of Time were planned with the original team being in charge. This announcement followed a new trademark Sega had filed earlier in the same year. Shortly after, a countdown on the Ecco the Dolphin website appeared to start at a length of about 8,500 hours, which pointed to an end date in April 2026. When it had ended, A&R Atelier, a studio created by Annunziata and other members of the original team, announced Ecco the Dolphin: Complete, a compilation containing a new Ecco game and multiple versions of Ecco the Dolphin and The Tides of Time.Afterwards, the countdown was replaced with a music player that contains music from Ecco the Dolphin and The Tides of Time, and a new countdown was added, which was intended to end on July 21, 2026, however, when the countdown reached its end, more time was added. This occurred multiple times until October 19th, 2026, when the clock had reached its end, the site was updated with the addition of two mini games, and the countdown had frozen.

== Ports and related media ==
Ecco the Dolphin and Ecco: The Tides of Time were both re-released for the Sega CD, Master System and Game Gear, and Defender of the Future was originally released for the Dreamcast and later re-released for the PlayStation 2. The Sega CD version of Ecco the Dolphin was ported to Microsoft Windows in 1995. Ecco the Dolphin was also re-released on the Game Boy Advance as part of the fourth Sega Smash Pack. Ecco the Dolphin, Ecco: The Tides of Time, and Ecco Jr. can be found on the PlayStation 2 and PlayStation Portable game Sega Genesis Collection. All of the Mega Drive games have been released on Valve's Steam platform, as well as being ported to Nintendo's Virtual Console and the first game was ported to Microsoft's Xbox Live Arcade.

The first Ecco game received two comic book adaptations, each of which consisted of six parts that were published in the UK Sonic the Comic series. The first series, Ecco the Dolphin, was published in 1993, written by Woodrow Phoenix and drawn by Chris Webster and Steve White. The second series, Return of Ecco the Dolphin, was published in 1995, written by Alan Mckenzie and drawn by White.

== Legal dispute and aftermath ==
In late 2016 series creator Ed Annunziata reached a settlement with Sega regarding the legal rights to the franchise. The attempt to regain the intellectual property rights, in part, arose from Annunziata's unsuccessful attempt to make a spiritual successor called The Big Blue funded through Kickstarter which could not use the Ecco name. Although the exact details of the settlement were unclear, it was believed by media outlets including Venture Beat that it could pave the way for a new installment in the franchise by Annunziata. Soon thereafter, Annunziata himself talked about wanting to revive the series for the Nintendo Switch. In a 2019 interview he addressed the Big Blue project, commenting "I still very strongly believe in the story and the mechanics, but it really can't be a spiritual successor to Ecco, it has to be Ecco! One thing I can say is in the future, people are playing this game. I never give up!"

== Soundtrack ==
Songs of Time

Soundtrack album by Spencer Nilsen
- Released: September 3, 1996
- Genres: Electronica; Ambient music
- Length: 64:17
- Producer: SegaSoft

Ecco: Songs of Time is a soundtrack album which contains the original soundtrack from the Sega CD versions of Ecco the Dolphin and Ecco: The Tides of Time. It was released on September 3, 1996. The music is composed by Spencer Nilsen. The music is atmospheric and ambient, heavy on high-quality synthesizer, low-frequency percussion and various samples, including dolphin squeaks and squeals.

=== Track listing ===
Tracks 1–11 from Ecco: The Tides of Time, tracks 12–18 from Ecco the Dolphin

| No. | Title | Length |
|---|---|---|
| 1. | "Abyss" | 4:41 |
| 2. | "Botswana" | 3:14 |
| 3. | "The Desert Below" | 2:43 |
| 4. | "Deception" | 2:04 |
| 5. | "Deep Marjimba" | 3:14 |
| 6. | "Blue Dream" | 3:25 |
| 7. | "St. Gabriel's Mask" | 4:30 |
| 8. | "Heart of the Giant" | 2:39 |
| 9. | "Transcended" | 3:18 |
| 10. | "Mountains Below" | 3:36 |
| 11. | "Treefish" | 3:48 |
| 12. | "Aqua Vistas" | 4:24 |
| 13. | "Lonesome Search" | 1:49 |
| 14. | "Friend or Foe" | 6:09 |
| 15. | "Motion E" | 4:08 |
| 16. | "The Machine" | 3:25 |
| 17. | "Sounding Echo" | 3:10 |
| 18. | "Time Forgotten" | 3:59 |

== See also ==
- Chuck Person's Eccojams Vol. 1
- Ecco2k
