= Toxic Crusaders (1992 video game) =

- Genesis box art
- Developers: Tose (NES); Realtime Associates (Game Boy); Infogrames (Genesis)
- Publishers: Bandai (NES, Game Boy); Sega (Genesis)
- Composers: NES; Shinji Amagishi; Game Boy; David Hayes; David Warhol; Genesis; Frederic Mentzen
- Platforms: Game Boy, NES, Genesis
- Release: NES: NA: April 1992; Game Boy: NA: September 1992 Genesis; NA: 1992
- Genres: Beat 'em up, platform, shoot 'em up
- Mode: Single-player

Toxic Crusaders refers to three separate side-scrolling video games released in 1992 which are all based on the American cartoon series Toxic Crusaders (1991) and Troma Entertainment's 1984 film The Toxic Avenger. The Nintendo Entertainment System version was developed by Tose, the Game Boy version by Realtime Associates, and the Sega Genesis version by Infogrames. A Super NES version was planned by Bandai, but it was not released.
