= Spider-Man vs. The Kingpin =

1991 video game

- North American Genesis box art
- Developers: Technopop; Recreational Brainware (Note: Game Gear, Master System, and Sega CD versions developed by Sega.)
- Publisher: Sega (Note: Game Gear version released by Acclaim Entertainment under the Flying Edge brand name.)
- Producer: Ed Annunziata: Game Gear Stewart Kosoy
- Designer: Christopher Erhardt: Sega CD Burt Sloane Bridget McKenna Douglas Herring Lisa Sands
- Programmer: Burt Sloane; Jonathan Miller: Game Gear, Master System Paul Hutchinson
- Artist: Scott Haile; Joe Ellen Reiss; Jennifer Martin; Susan Greene: Sega CD Burt Sloane
- Composer: Mark Miller; John Karr; David Javelosa: Game Gear, Master System Paul Hutchinson Sega CD Spencer Nilsen David Young
- Platforms: Sega Genesis, Master System, Game Gear, Sega CD
- Release: August 1991: Genesis; NA: August 1991; JP: October 18, 1991; EU: 1991 Master System; NA: August 1991; EU: October 1991 Game Gear; EU: April 1992; NA: May 19, 1992 Sega CD; EU: November 1993; NA: 1993; UK: February 1994
- Genres: Action, platform
- Mode: Single-player

Spider-Man vs. The Kingpin (originally released as Spider-Man) is a 1991 action-platform video game based on the Marvel Comics character Spider-Man. The game was originally developed by Technopop and Recreational Brainware and published by Sega for the Sega Genesis, before being ported by Sega to the Master System and Game Gear, with the latter version published by Acclaim Entertainment through its Flying Edge division. An updated version for the Sega CD, also developed by Sega, was released under the name The Amazing Spider-Man vs. The Kingpin.

The player controls Spider-Man as he battles various supervillains (Doctor Octopus, Sandman, the Lizard, Hobgoblin, Vulture, Mysterio, Electro, and Venom) in order to obtain the keys needed to disarm a nuclear bomb that the Kingpin has not only framed Spider-Man for stealing, but plans to detonate within 24 hours. In the middle of the game, Spider-Man's wife Mary Jane Watson is also kidnapped by Venom.

== Gameplay ==
Spider‑Man vs. The Kingpin centers on fast, side‑scrolling platform action where the player uses Spider‑Man's agility and web‑swinging to move through levels, fight enemies, and navigate environments. Combat involves punching foes, using web attacks, and dealing with hazards such as guard dogs, bats, gorillas, and hired thugs. Spider‑Man can throw webs in multiple directions to swing across spaces, and the core mechanics involve running, jumping, swinging, and engaging in close‑range fights while collecting items.

== Plot ==
The Kingpin places a nuclear bomb within New York City and frames Spider-Man as the perpetrator. The keys to deactivate the bomb have been dispersed to many of Spider-Man's rogue gallery, including Doctor Octopus, Sandman, the Lizard, Hobgoblin, Vulture, Mysterio, Electro, and Venom.

Eventually, Venom kidnaps Mary Jane Parker. Peter obtains the keys and disarms the bomb, as well as saving Mary Jane before she is dropped into a pit of acid by the Kingpin.

== Ports ==
=== Genesis version ===
The Sega Genesis version was released in 1991 and was widely popular among comic book fans, helping to establish the success of the console. Critics noted that the game had superior graphics and sound, and faithfully recreated the characters from the video game universe. Even allowing the player to take pictures of major and minor enemies, they could be sold at the Daily Bugle to buy more web fluid. The additional ultra-hard challenge was a fight with Venom at the end of each round, before reaching the actual boss. In addition to Venom, there are also many other popular Spider-Man villains that players would have to fight, such as Doctor Octopus, Lizard, Electro, Sandman, and Hobgoblin.

Produced by Sega of America producer Ed Annunziata the original version of the game was contracted out to Innerprise Software. However, after failing to meet milestones and after Marvel voiced quality concerns, Randel B. Reiss was hired to work on the game in his newly founded company Technopop, recycling Innerprise's base game but redrawing or scrapping most of its artwork. The lead programmer was Burt Sloane, who Reiss met at Northeastern University, and in turn Sloane brought in more college mates, Jonathan Miller, whose brother Mark was writing the game's music, and David Foley. Once a dispute with Technopop ended cancelling their contract with no time left to find another developer, Sega of America Senior Vice President of Product Development Ken Balthaser gave Annunziata and Clyde Grossman the approval to allow Sloane to continue programming the game alone, with the team now operating as the developer Recreational Brainware. The game had Sloane develop a proprietary tool set to build levels, with collision detection in particular being represented with blocks that lined up with background tiles. According to Reiss, this version was a huge commercial success: two-thirds of all Genesis owners at the time also bought the game, which single-handedly convinced Marvel Comics not to cancel its licensing deal with Sega.

=== Master System / Game Gear version ===
The Master System version was one of the last Master System games officially sold in North America. Like other Master System games released in the United States in 1991, it is European imports that were published by Sega of America, as no boxes or manuals were produced for the American market. The game had the same basic format and storyline as the 16-bit version, with redesigned levels, cutscenes (that included a cameo from Doctor Strange) and even on the easiest setting was seen as being difficult to complete. In this version, Mary Jane would not be kidnapped but still appears at the end of the game if players attain the best ending.

A nearly identical port was also released for the Sega Game Gear portable system.

=== Sega CD version ===
The 16-bit Sega CD version (1993) made several improvements to the game to take advantage of the extra memory capabilities of the CD-ROM system. Animated scenes, with voice actors, were added to move the story along and to show what happened when the player died. Gameplay was sped up in this version; Spider-Man could move and climb surfaces significantly faster than in the Genesis version. The game also added two new levels, extra combat moves, the ability to collect reproductions of famous Spider-Man comic books issues, and an original musical score by Spencer Nilsen and rock band Mr. Big. The game was also more nonlinear, as the player could venture to various locations throughout the city, including a local television station. However, the ability to take pictures during the game to earn money for web fluid was removed from this version. The game also added two new levels (Mysterio's Funhouse and the Vulture in the subway). In addition, before battling the Kingpin, the player must first defeat Bullseye and Typhoid Mary. The game had three different difficulty levels (easy, normal, and nightmare), and a contest was held (details were provided in the instructions manual, along with a sheet to mail in) to see who could complete the game in the ultra-hard nightmare mode and collect all 21 comic book covers.

== Reception ==
Reception

Review score
Publication	Score
Hyper	73% (Sega CD)

== Legacy ==
The Sega CD version of the game and its additional "Mysterio's FunHouse" level inspired a similar level in the Xbox, PlayStation 2, and GameCube versions of the 2004 game Spider-Man 2, developed by Treyarch. Mysterio was included in the game in part as an intended homage to Spider-Man vs. The Kingpin.
