= William Todd Tribell =

American businessman (born 1968)

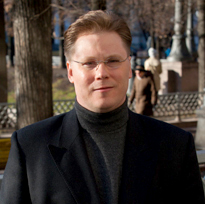
- Born: February 10, 1968 (age 58); Little Rock, Arkansas, US
- Occupations: Entrepreneur, author
- Website: www.wtodd.com

William Todd Tribell (born February 10, 1968) is an American businessman. He is best known for his involvement with Davidoff cigars in Eastern Europe. He is also the co-founder of the Digital Capital Corporation.

== Early career ==
Tribell's first business was a car polishing service, which he started at age 17.

== Russian enterprises ==
Tribell moved to Moscow in 1991, working with Winthrop P. Rockefeller in the technology sector. As an advisor in Russia, he helped foreign interests navigate the business culture and trends of post-Soviet Russia. Dean Takahashi of Venture Beat magazine wrote that Tribell has, "spent a couple of decades as an advisor trying to commercialize Russian-made technologies for the rest of the world." Tribell also partnered with Davidoff in order to develop the cigar market in Russia, becoming the importer of the cigars in the Commonwealth of Independent States and Baltic countries. His projects with Davidoff have included the conceptualization and design of the Davidoff Malaya Bronnaya boutique in Moscow.

== Digital Capital Corporation ==
In 2011, Tribell and Stewart Kosoy co-founded Digital Capital Corporation in Switzerland. Digital Capital Corporation invests private equity with a focus on funding video games, software, and digital downloads. Tribell has stated that the company prefers to deal with idea-stage ventures, and avoids brick and mortar projects that require inventory. Development divisions of the company include Digital Power Entertainment and Dream Weddings. Tribell is also a member of the board of directors. In May 2012, Tribell appeared on a finance panel of industry experts who advised game developers at the Nordic Game Conference in Malmö, Sweden.

== Personal life ==
In 2008, Tribell wrote and self-published a short digital memoir, Tausadi: My Adventures in the Kalahari, recounting an African lion hunting expedition he took with his father. Tribell has donated to Estonia's Tallinn Children's Hospital Foundation, specifically supporting children with cancer. Tribell's grandfather, George W. Tribell, died in 1982. He was a recipient of the US Military's Bronze Star.
