= Jurassic Park (Sega CD video game) =

1994 video game

- North American cover art
- Developer: Sega Multimedia Studio
- Publisher: Sega
- Producer: Scot Bayless
- Composers: David Javelosa; Barry Blum; Brian Coburn; Tom Miley; Spencer Nilsen
- Series: Jurassic Park
- Platform: Sega CD
- Release: NA: Early 1994; UK: April 1994; JP: September 30, 1994
- Genre: Point-and-click adventure
- Mode: Single-player

Jurassic Park is a 1994 point-and-click adventure game developed and published by Sega for the Sega CD. The video game is based on the 1993 film of the same name, and includes elements from Michael Crichton's 1990 novel Jurassic Park, which the film is based upon.

== Plot ==
Set after the events of the film, a group of scientists are sent to collect dinosaur eggs at InGen's Jurassic Park. This theme park is populated with genetically engineered dinosaurs and is located on the fictional island of Isla Nublar. After the group's helicopter crashes on the island, a survivor – controlled by the player – receives a video message from Emily Shimura, a computer expert. Shimura states that the crash was the result of sabotage orchestrated by InGen's corporate rival, Biosyn Corporation, which paid to have a bomb attached to the helicopter.

A second helicopter is sent to rescue the player, but it is also compromised by Biosyn, which has sent out its own team to steal the dinosaur eggs. When Biosyn's helicopter arrives, the company's agents are tranquilized by the player, who uses the helicopter to escape the island.

== Gameplay ==
Jurassic Park is a point-and-click adventure game, with a strong emphasis on action sequences which require split-second timing. The player must search Isla Nublar to retrieve eggs from seven different dinosaur species and place them in an incubator at the Jurassic Park visitor center. The eggs must be collected within a real-time 12-hour limit.

Jurassic Park is played from a first-person perspective, giving the player a panoramic view of the surroundings as well as various tools to interact with, and a trio of weapons to contend with dinosaurs. Because none of the weapons (a stun gun, tranquilizer darts, and gas grenades) are lethal, each situation is in the form of a puzzle disguised as combat which requires more than just shooting to survive. First-aid kits can be used to replenish the player's health, while night vision goggles allow the player to see in dark environments. Paleontologist Robert T. Bakker makes video appearances throughout the game to provide the player with hints and dinosaur information via special Dinosaur Field Kiosks that are located near dinosaur paddocks. Shimura also provides the player with information through video messages.

== Development and release ==
In January 1992, Sega spent an estimated $1 million to purchase the rights to develop a Jurassic Park video game. Sega had the rights to use the Jurassic Park logo and some sounds from the film, but none of the characters. Elements from Michael Crichton's novel, Jurassic Park, were added into the game. Jurassic Park is the first Sega CD video game to be developed entirely in the United States by Sega of America.

Initially, the game was to include three different perspectives: top-down, side-scrolling, and first-person. Development began on prototype versions of each perspective. The game's designers later realized that the game was too big, and decided to concentrate on only one perspective instead. The designers chose the first-person perspective which was the most complete prototype out of the three at that point in development. The designers scrapped the previous game design and re-began development to redesign everything. The designers felt the game would work better as a first-person point-and-click game. While point-and-click games were popular on PCs at the time, they were less common on home video game consoles.

Full motion video (FMV) sequences were created for the game using Cinepak. The game's backgrounds are based on actual video footage of geographical locations. Sega sent several teams to various locations to film the footage, including Georgia and a swampland in Alabama. The development team started with 30 hours of footage and scanned portions of it into Macintosh computers, allowing the team to use the geographical textures and colors in the game. Background sketches were created by artist Mimi Doggett before being converted into pixels and sprites. In addition to appearing in the game, Bakker also provided information to the developers on how the game's dinosaurs should move and behave. Bakker shot his video segments in a studio against a white background. Afterwards, the footage had to be compressed to be playable on the Sega CD.

The dinosaurs were created using Silicon Graphics computers, which had also been used to create the creatures in the film. The development team originally intended to use rotoscoping before realizing how much quicker it would be to use Silicon Graphics computers. The dinosaur designs and other aspects of the game had to adhere to the Sega CD's limited 16-color palette. In addition to dinosaur sketches, models were also created for the animals to aid artists in creating dinosaur sprites on the Silicon Graphics computers. Birds were also studied to determine the dinosaur movements. For example, still frames of ostriches were referenced for the game's Tyrannosaurus.

Scot Bayless was the game's producer. Spencer Nilsen composed the game's soundtrack. Sound designer Brian Coburn, along with a recording team, traveled to Georgia's Okefenokee Swamp to create audio recordings of angry alligators. According to Coburn, "We tracked down and cornered alligators in the swamp to try to get them angry so that they would hiss. We were cocky and deliberately aggravated the alligators to get a more dramatic response." Coburn and the recording team were nearly attacked by an alligator during the process. The alligator sounds were used for the game's Tyrannosaurus roar, while bird sounds were used for other dinosaurs. Jurassic Park was one of the few Sega CD games to utilize the system's QSound feature.

In January 1993, a demo of the game was shown at the Consumer Electronics Show in Las Vegas, Nevada. As of July 1993, the game's U.S. release was scheduled for fall 1993. Ultimately, the game was released in the U.S. during the first quarter of 1994, followed by a U.K. release in April 1994.

== Reception ==
Reception

Review scores
Publication	Score
AllGame	4/5
Consoles +	74%
Computer and Video Games	87/100
Electronic Gaming Monthly	6-8/10
Famitsu	7/10, 6/10, 7/10, 8/10
Joypad	80%
Mean Machines Sega	73/100
Mega Fun	75%
Player One	80%
Video Games (DE)	66%
VideoGames & Computer Entertainment	9/10
Entertainment Weekly	C
Games World: The Magazine	69/100
Mega	84%
MegaTech	79%
Sega Magazine	92/100
Sega Power	86%
Sega Pro	87%
Sega Zone	76%

Joel Easley of Scripps Howard News Service considered it the best Jurassic Park game released up to that point and one of the best games available for the Sega CD. Easley praised the music and sound effects for their use of QSound and also praised the graphics, but he said that the game's save feature takes up too much space. Roy Bassave of Knight-Ridder News Service considered the SNES version of Jurassic Park to be superior, and criticized the Sega CD version for the slow loading times needed to generate each new area of the game that the player explores.

GamePro praised the sound effects but criticized the graphics: "Although this is a CD game, which implies that it will showcase powerful graphics capabilities, you won't see any particularly fascinating images jumping off the screen at you." GamePro noted the game's excessive amount of searching required by the player, writing that while "this doesn't distract from the fun, it certainly slows down the action." GamePro wrote that the Sega CD version was "definitely the most educational and entertaining" video game adaptation of Jurassic Park, calling it "as much a classroom tool as an enjoyable game," although the magazine noted that younger players "may be bored by its detailed gameplay."

Bob Strauss of Entertainment Weekly wrote that it "moves at too leisurely a pace to satisfy action fans, though it has some admirable features, such as scholarly dissertations on various breeds of dinosaur." Allie West of MegaTech praised the sound and controls. She generally found the graphics to be grainy, but praised the FMV sequences. She opined that the gameplay lacked depth and consisted of "mindless wandering".

Mean Machines Sega praised the FMV, but also wrote, "Lack of excitement is the factor that brings down Jurassic CD's lastability. Jurassic CD doesn't deliver the elements of the film you really want." Game Players considered it a good game, but "kinda short". In November 1994, U.K. magazine Mega placed the game at number 9 in their Top Mega CD Games of All Time. At the time of the game's release, the character of Emily Shimura was noted as being one of the few female characters in video games to have a role that was favorably associated with computer technology.

In a retrospective review, Shawn Sackenheim of AllGame wrote that the graphics suffer from the system's limited color palette, which made "everything dark and dithered, though it, somewhat, adds to the mood of the game." Sackenheim also praised the game for "A well rounded soundtrack and immersive sound effects."

== See also ==
- Jurassic Park video games
