= Greendog: The Beached Surfer Dude! =

1992 video game

- European Mega Drive box art
- Developer: Interactive Designs
- Publisher: Sega
- Producers: Michael Latham; Creator: Ric Green
- Programmers: Christopher Warner; Robert Morgan; John Kuwaye
- Artists: Maureen Kringen; Doug Nishimura; Joan Igawa
- Composer: Paul Gadbois
- Platforms: Genesis, Game Gear
- Release: Genesis; NA: 1992; EU: October 7, 1992; Game Gear; 1993
- Genre: Platform
- Mode: Single-player

Greendog: The Beached Surfer Dude! is a platform game developed by Interactive Designs for the Sega Genesis console, and was published by Sega in 1992. A port to the handheld Game Gear was released a year later.

== Gameplay ==
Screenshot of the first stage

The gameplay requires players to survive several side-scrolling levels, armed with only a flying disc that they can shoot at enemies to destroy them or at various objects such as totem poles, to obtain food and therefore reduce the damage meter.

The game has some homages to earlier side-scrolling adventure games, such as Pitfall! as the character often has to swing on vines to advance and many of the levels take place in a tropical jungle or an ancient Mesoamerican temple. Many levels require the player to use a skateboard or inline skates to advance. The six levels cover the Caribbean islands of Grenada, Mustique, Curaçao, Jamaica, Saba, and finally St. Vincent. The latter level is in a volcanic state, where the temple and final piece of treasure are found.

== Plot ==
The eponymous protagonist of the story is Greendog, the player character, a laid-back, cool surfer and skater with a mop of bleached blonde hair. He has surfed most of the biggest waves around, including off the coast of Australia, California, and in the Mediterranean, and is always in search of the biggest waves which will give him the biggest thrill and he cares for little else in life. He has numerous contraptions and toys, such as a gyrocopter, inline skates, a skateboard and an antique frisbee which could be very dangerous in the wrong hands. He does not say much except "dude" and "cool".

One day, while surfing in the Caribbean Sea off the coast of the Grenada islands, Greendog is knocked off his surfboard by the biggest freak wave he has ever seen, and falls unconscious in the sea. When he wakes on the beach, he is apparently in another version of our world, or at least some form of very vivid dreamworld, and a mysterious and apparently magical gold pendant is tied around his neck and he is unable to remove it. His girlfriend Bambi—a beautiful, voluptuous blonde woman in a red bikini—finds him and explains to Greendog that the pendant is of Aztec origin and carries a terrible curse; it dooms the wearer to be attacked by animals and wild prehistoric creatures and, worst of all, will prohibit surfing.

The only way that Greendog can lift the curse is to travel to a lost Aztec civilization and track down six pieces of a sacred Aztec treasure that were scattered across the Caribbean Islands, so that the pieces can be put back together, and ultimately so that Greendog can remove both the curse and the pendant. However, nobody knows exactly where the pieces of the treasure are.

== Reception ==
Reception

Review score
Publication	Score
Electronic Gaming Monthly	6/10, 6/10, 7/10, 7/10

An October 1992 review in GameFan Magazine gave Greendog a rating of 71.5%.

In Retro Gamer, writer Ashley Day criticized Greendog, though he also stated "it's not a particularly bad game". He called the game a clone of Pitfall! that suffers from poor character design.
