= Clutch Hitter =

1991 video game

- Arcade logo for Clutch Hitter
- Developer(s): Sega
- Publisher(s): Sega
- Platform(s): Arcade, Game Gear
- Release: NA: 1991
- Genre(s): Sports
- Mode(s): Single-player

Clutch Hitter is a baseball video game released by Sega in 1991. It was released in video arcades as well for Sega's portable Game Gear. The Japanese version of the game features players and teams from Japan's Nippon Professional Baseball league. The American version of the game sports a license from the Major League Baseball Players Association and has rosters composed of actual professional baseball players, but only city names for the teams since it was not licensed by Major League Baseball. In the arcade game, the on-field perspective is from behind home plate while the viewpoint in the Game Gear version alternates between this view (when the player is batting) to a view from the pitcher's mound when the player is pitching, just as in Bases Loaded. In the Game Gear game, the number of innings can be chosen and linking to another Game Gear is possible for multiplayer gameplay.

== Reception ==
In Japan, Game Machine listed Clutch Hitter on their June 15, 1991 issue as being the sixth most-successful table arcade unit of the month. It went on to be Japan's seventh highest-grossing arcade game of 1991.
