= Ecco the Dolphin: Defender of the Future =

2000 video game

- Developer: Appaloosa Interactive
- Publishers: Dreamcast: WW: Sega; PlayStation 2: NA: Acclaim Entertainment; EU: Sony Computer Entertainment
- Designers: Gergely Csaszar; Maurice Molyneaux; Keith Higashihara; Kadocsa Tassonyi; Jozsef Szentesi; Csaba Soltesz
- Composers: Tim Follin (in-game music); Attila Heger (cinematic music)
- Series: Ecco the Dolphin
- Platforms: Dreamcast, PlayStation 2
- Release: Dreamcast: EU: June 16, 2000; NA: August 15, 2000; JP: January 25, 2001; PlayStation 2: NA: February 28, 2002; EU: March 8, 2002
- Genre: Action-adventure
- Mode: Single-player

Ecco the Dolphin: Defender of the Future is a 2000 action-adventure video game developed by Appaloosa Interactive and published by Sega for the Dreamcast. It is the fifth and final title to date to be released in the Ecco the Dolphin franchise and is a reboot of the series. A version for the PlayStation 2 was released in 2002.

Defender of the Future received generally positive reviews from critics. A sequel, Ecco II: Sentinels of the Universe, was planned but later cancelled following the Dreamcast's discontinuation in 2001.

== Gameplay ==
The gameplay is fairly similar to the old games, except it is in three dimensions. Ecco's sonar was kept as a means of interaction with other cetaceans (no longer called Singers in the game) and certain environmental objects, and a sonar map could be brought up. The same style of movement is kept with slight alterations for the 3-D environment. The control stick now only changed the direction Ecco is facing; pressing left and right changed the direction he faced horizontally, and pressing up and down changed the vertical direction. To actually move forward, the player has to tap a button to gain speed and hold the same button down to maintain it. Out of the water, Ecco can perform the purely aesthetic flips in the air just like the original games. Charging foes is kept as Ecco's standard attack, though the designers added a homing feature. The health and air meters were also kept, though the health meter can be increased by collecting power-ups called Vitalits, and the meters have a slightly different look compared to the Mega Drive games.

Some new moves are introduced in Defender of the Future. One is a quick 180-degree turn, useful for battles. Another is a means of stopping quickly; when Ecco has already stopped, the same buttons can make him swim backwards. A third new move is the tail walk; Ecco can raise his upper body out of the water, able to look at things above the surface; this is a good way to see small graphical details.

The graphics of the game are generally regarded as one of the most realistic ever seen in a Dreamcast game. Many reviewers have commented that Ecco looks like a real dolphin. One of the most major complaints against the graphics is the high level of fog; other reviewers have said that visibility in the ocean is often much reduced from what it is above the surface. There were also some pop-up problems with distant objects. This was apparently caused by the engine not being that efficient overall, and not being able to render as many on-screen things as was desirable without the generation of too much slowdown. The fog was used to obscure the distance and decrease the number of polygons that had to be drawn. The few cutscenes use the in-game graphical engine, and featured voice-over narration by Tom Baker.

Defender of the Future continues the legacy of high difficulty set by its predecessors. The levels are again divided up, but the idea of a password system was dropped in favor of a memory card save file. The game has few loading times in the levels; the levels load all at once just before they started, and these load times could be moderately long.

The "charge song" and "confusion song" returned in Defender of the Future, but in different forms. The "charge song" is given a name, the Power of Sonar, and is part of a set of five temporary power-ups that could be activated by collecting icons. The powers were:

- Power of Vigor: Ecco moves faster and does more damage when charging enemies, and he can swim against strong currents.
- Power of Sonar: Sonar does damage to enemies and can break apart certain stones.
- Power of Air: The air meter is temporarily doubled.
- Power of Endurance: The health meter was maxed out to double the normal maximum; it could not be replenished until it reached the level the player had already obtained and would be lost if the player made it to the next level of the game.
- Power of Stealth: Ecco becomes temporarily invisible.

The "confusion song" was named the Song of the Shark, and it too is part of a larger set of songs. These songs were permanent and activated by singing at the right thing. They are the following:

- Song of the Shark: Confuses sharks, leaving them vulnerable to attack. This does not work on the great white or the white sharks in later levels.
- Song of the Turtle: Turtles will follow Ecco around.
- Song of the Fish: Schools of fish will follow Ecco.
- Song of the Ray: Makes manta rays go in the direction the song pointed; makes smaller sting rays panic and flee.
- Song of the Plant: Makes a certain kind of plant spray ink and another plant "sing" while bobbing up and down, which distracts the Clan.

== Plot ==
Defender of the Future bears a different storyline from that of the Mega Drive/Genesis games and thus is considered a reboot of the series. The storyline and game are divided into four parts.

The aggressive alien Foe were once engaged in a war with Earth, but were repelled by the combined forces of humans and dolphins. Seeking revenge, they attack the Guardian, Earth's defense system, and succeed in damaging him; Ecco, a noble dolphin, is called upon to heal the injured Guardian and drive off the alien race. To further the invasion, the Foe Queen steals the Spheres containing the prominent noble traits of dolphinkind: Ambition, Intelligence, Compassion, Wisdom, and Humility, each of which changes the future of Earth and the seas.

With all five Spheres gone, the world becomes Man's Nightmare, where humankind enslaved the dolphins for their own purposes. This drove away the Foe, but led man and the majority of sea life to extinction, and the remaining dolphins are too unintelligent and cowed to do anything about the problem. Ecco retrieving the Spheres of Ambition and Intelligence leads to Dolphin's Nightmare, where dolphinkind rose up against the humans and other ocean species, becoming warlike and cruel. Dolphin society divided itself into castes, and Ecco infiltrates both the Outcasts and the Clan to retrieve the Spheres of Compassion and Wisdom. This led humans and dolphins to work together to bring peace.

Without Humility, however, Earth was unprepared for the Foe's invasion and fell to the enemy. Ecco infiltrates the Foe Queen's base but cannot harm her directly; to defeat her, he blinds her, then creates a hole in her chest and burrows into her ribcage to attack her vulnerable heart. Once the Foe Queen's heart stops, Ecco retrieves the Sphere of Humility and restores the Guardian and the future of the seas, bringing humankind and dolphinkind to a new era.

== Development ==
Appaloosa's Managing Director Andras Csaszar told Official Dreamcast Magazine that development took over two years and involved some members of the team responsible for the original Mega Drive game. While the team did not take motion capture of actual dolphins, they consulted videos of dolphins in movement and spent "more than a year" to develop "a unique skeleton animation system" to achieve the "desired lifelike results". The game environment "took three or four full cycles of building, testing and discarding the results before we mastered the quality" and that their aim had been to evoke "National Geographic underwater video documentaries".

The story was written by science fiction author David Brin, who had already written stories featuring intelligent dolphins in his Uplift Universe.

== Reception ==
Reception

Aggregate scores
Aggregator	Score	
Aggregator	Dreamcast	PS2
GameRankings	81.04%	68.50%
Metacritic	84/100	71/100

Review scores
Publication	Score	
Publication	Dreamcast	PS2
Computer and Video Games	9/10	8/10
Edge	7/10	N/A
Electronic Gaming Monthly	8.17/10	7.5/10
Game Informer	N/A	5.5/10
GameFan	98%	N/A
GamePro	5/5	4/5
GameRevolution	B+	N/A
GameSpot	8.2/10	7.4/10
GameSpy	8/10	N/A
IGN	7.6/10	7.8/10
Next Generation	2/5	N/A
Official U.S. PlayStation Magazine	N/A	2.5/5
Maxim	6/10	N/A

The game was received very positively and was considered "one of the year 2000's best" by IGN in 2000. GameRankings and Metacritic gave it a score of 81% and 84 out of 100 for the Dreamcast version, and 69% and 71 out of 100 for the PlayStation 2 version.
