= Appaloosa Interactive =

Hungarian video game developing company

- Industry: Video game industry
- Founded: 1982; 43–44 years ago as Novotrade International in Budapest, Hungary
- Founder: Andras Csaszar; Stephen J. Friedman
- Defunct: 2006; 19–20 years ago
- Headquarters: Mountain View, California, U.S.
- Key people: Andras Csaszar (president); Stephen J. Friedman (CEO)
- Products: Video game development

Appaloosa Interactive (formerly Novotrade International) was a corporation, founded in 1982 in Hungary, that produced video games, computer programs and television commercials during the 1980s and 1990s.

== History ==
Andras Csaszar and Stephen J. Friedman founded Novotrade International. Csaszar served as the company's president, while Friedman was chief executive officer. Novotrade began operating branches in the United States in 1989, and was renamed Appaloosa Interactive (after the horse breed of the same name) in November 1996. That month, the company unveiled its 10-month-old Internet technologies division, Appaloosa Online. The company's headquarters were in Mountain View, California. Appaloosa was the parent company and owner of two software development companies in Budapest, Hungary. Appaloosa was known for its Ecco the Dolphin game series for Sega. Appaloosa also developed two Contra games on the PlayStation and Sega Saturn for Konami.

Appaloosa's final game was Jaws Unleashed, released in 2006, and based on the Jaws series of films. The company ceased operations in 2006.

== Organization ==
Appaloosa had 100 employees as of January 2001 and had produced over 150 video games up to that point, many of which were released in Europe. At that time, Friedman said, "In all the years we have been in business, we have only failed to complete a project because of our own inability once or twice."

== Games ==
- The Adventures of Batman and Robin (Game Gear)
- Alternative World Games
- Around The World In 80 Days
- Blades of Steel (Amiga, Commodore 64, MS-DOS)
- California Games (Genesis)
- California Pro Golf
- Castlevania (Amiga)
- Catch a Thief
- Circus Games
- Contra: Legacy of War (PlayStation, Saturn)
- The Contra Adventure (PlayStation)
- Cyborg Justice (Genesis)
- Ecco the Dolphin (Genesis, Sega CD, Master System, Game Gear)
- Ecco: The Tides of Time (Genesis, Sega CD, Game Gear)
- Ecco Jr. (Genesis)
- Ecco the Dolphin: Defender of the Future (Dreamcast, PlayStation 2)
- Exosquad (Genesis)
- Galaxy Force II (Saturn)
- Garfield: Caught in the Act (Game Gear)
- Golf Construction Set
- Grossology
- Holyfield Boxing
- How Things Work in Busytown
- Impossible Mission II (Amiga, Amstrad CPC, Apple II, Atari ST, Commodore 64, MS-DOS, ZX Spectrum, NES)
- Rudyard Kipling's The Jungle Book (MS-DOS)
- Jaws Unleashed (PlayStation 2, Xbox, Windows)
- King's Quest V: Absence Makes the Heart Go Yonder! (NES)
- Kolibri (32X)
- The Magic School Bus: Space Exploration Game (Genesis)
- Museum Madness
- Peter Pan: A Story Painting Adventure (MS-DOS)
- Power Rangers Jigsaw Puzzles
- Power Rangers PowerActive Math
- Power Rangers PowerActive Words
- Power Rangers Print Kit
- R.B.I. Baseball 2
- Richard Scarry's Busytown (MS-DOS, Genesis)
- Qix (NES)
- Sentinel Worlds I: Future Magic
- Sky Target (Saturn, Windows)
- South Park (PlayStation)
- Starship Andromeda
- Star Trek: Deep Space Nine – Crossroads of Time (Genesis, Super NES)
- Sub Battle Simulator
- Super Action Football
- Tails and the Music Maker (Pico)
- The Busy World of Busytown
- The Lost World: Jurassic Park (Genesis)
- The Lost World: Jurassic Park (Saturn)
- The Simpsons: Arcade Game (Commodore 64, MS-DOS)
- Three Dirty Dwarves (Saturn, Windows)
- Tiny Tank (PlayStation)
- Tiny Toon Adventures Cartoon Workshop (NES)
- Tomcat Alley (Windows)
- USS Stinger (MS-DOS)
- Wacky Races (Windows, PlayStation)
- Water Polo
- Wild West
- Wilson Pro Staff Golf
- World Karate Championship
- World Trophy Soccer (Genesis)

=== Unreleased ===
- Airball (NES)
- Bloodliners (Genesis)
