= Hessler Street Fair =

Arts and music festival in Cleveland, Ohio

- Location: Cleveland, Ohio
- Coordinates: 41°30′37″N 81°36′19″W
- Country: United States
- Years active: 56–57
- Inaugurated: 1969

The Hessler Street Fair is an annual arts and music festival held the first weekend after Memorial Day on the historical wood-block-paved Hessler Road, in the University Circle neighborhood of Cleveland, Ohio, United States. Bureaucratic difficulty in securing permits and event insurance were among reasons for the long-running free festival's end in 2019.

After a hiatus, the fair was revived on October 3, 2026. It is expected to become an annual October event in the future.

== History ==
The first festival took place in 1969 and was held each year until 1984; following a ten-year hiatus festivals resumed in 1995. The event is organized as a fundraising event for the Hessler Neighborhood Association (HNA), which was formed in 1969 to save the neighborhood from being bulldozed to build student dormitories and parking lots for Case Western Reserve University. The proceeds are used "to preserve and maintain the neighborhood."

The festival, which according to its website attracts more than 10,000 visitors, is held outdoors, on Hessler Road (which is blocked off for the festival). It typically includes arts and crafts vendors, vegetarian food, and street performances, as well as main stage performances of folk music, reggae, and capoeira.

Hessler Road, a small one-way residential brick street, is listed in the National Register of Historic Places and was declared a historic district by the Cleveland Landmark Commission in 1975. The nearby Hessler Court is the only remaining street in Cleveland with Nicolson pavement, a.k.a. wood block or wooden pavement.

In 2007 the Hessler Street Fair was not held, although a "Hessler Unplugged" reunion block party took place on Saturday, May 19, 2007. The Fair resumed on May 17–18, 2008.

2019 marked the 40th Anniversary of the Hessler Street Fair and marked the end of the tradition. 21 bands performed over the final weekend.

The Hessler Neighborhood Foundation has announced that the fair will be revived on October 3, 2026. The fair ran from 12-7 pm on that date and featured seven live bands, as well as local fine artists, makers, and business people.

== Past acts ==
- John Bassette
- Alex Bevan
- John B. Burroughs
- Ian Corrigan as part of Chameleon
- I-Tal
- Jim Glover
- JiMiller Band
- Joe Bell & The Swing Lizards
- Carlos Jones & the P.L.U.S. Band
- Robert Lockwood
- Michael Stanley Band
- Daniel Thompson
- Tiny Alice
- Oroboros
- Hessler Court
- Brownell Court
- Froggy and the Shrimps
- Peter Laughner and Ruby Port
- Vibe and Direct
