= David Young (composer) =

American keyboardist and composer (1957–2024)

David J. Young
- Born: November 30, 1957
- Died: June 29, 2024 (aged 66) Burton, Ohio, U.S.
- Genres: Easy listening, electronic, classical, synthpop, holiday
- Occupations: Musician, composer, record producer, educator
- Instruments: Keyboards, synthesizers, organ, piano
- Years active: 1976–2024
- Label: Independent
- Website: http://www.daveyoungmusic.com

David Joseph Young (November 30, 1957 – June 29, 2024) was an American keyboardist, composer, producer and recording artist. He is most well known for producing the soundtracks to the Sega CD video games Sonic CD, Ecco: The Tides of Time, and The Amazing Spider-Man vs. The Kingpin. He has worked with Keith Emerson, Warren Zevon, Ronnie Montrose, Eric Carmen, Michael Stanley and the Resonators, Alex Bevan and the Cleveland Orchestra. Young died of cancer in Burton, Ohio, on June 29, 2024, at the age of 66.

== Career with Sega ==
In 1993, Young began contributing audio and music to Sega video games. He was present for the formation of Sega Music Group and Sega Music Group Studios in San Francisco. Young was a frequent collaborator with composer/producer Spencer Nilsen, who was director of Sega Music Group at the time. He was involved in over a dozen different Sega titles from 1993 to 1996, composing, producing and engineering soundtracks for titles such as The Amazing Spider-Man vs. The Kingpin, Sonic CD, Ecco: The Tides of Time, Congo The Movie: The Lost City of Zinj, NBA Live, NHL Live, and Wild Woody, as well as many others.

== Works ==
Title	Year	System	Notes
Sonic CD (US)	1993	Sega CD	with Spencer Nilsen and Sterling, keyboards and synthesizer programming.
The Amazing Spider-Man vs. The Kingpin	1993	Sega CD	with Nilsen.
Ecco: The Tides of Time	1994	Sega CD	Engineering, keyboards & programming, additional writing with Nilsen.
Wild Woody	1995	Sega CD	Engineering, mixing and mastering, sound/foley effects.
Cyber Speedway	1995	Sega Saturn	Recording, engineering & mixing.
Congo The Movie: The Lost City of Zinj	1996	Sega Saturn	with Brad Kaiser.
Mr. Bones	1996	Sega Saturn	Assistant on the set.
Christmas Favorites II	2013		with Tommy Dobeck, piano, organ and synthesizer.
Boomer! Utopian Memoir	2015		with Alex Bevan, keyboards.
Lucky 7	2021		with Marc Lee Shannon, organ and keyboards.
