= UPMC Events Center =

Indoor arena in Moon, Pennsylvania, USA

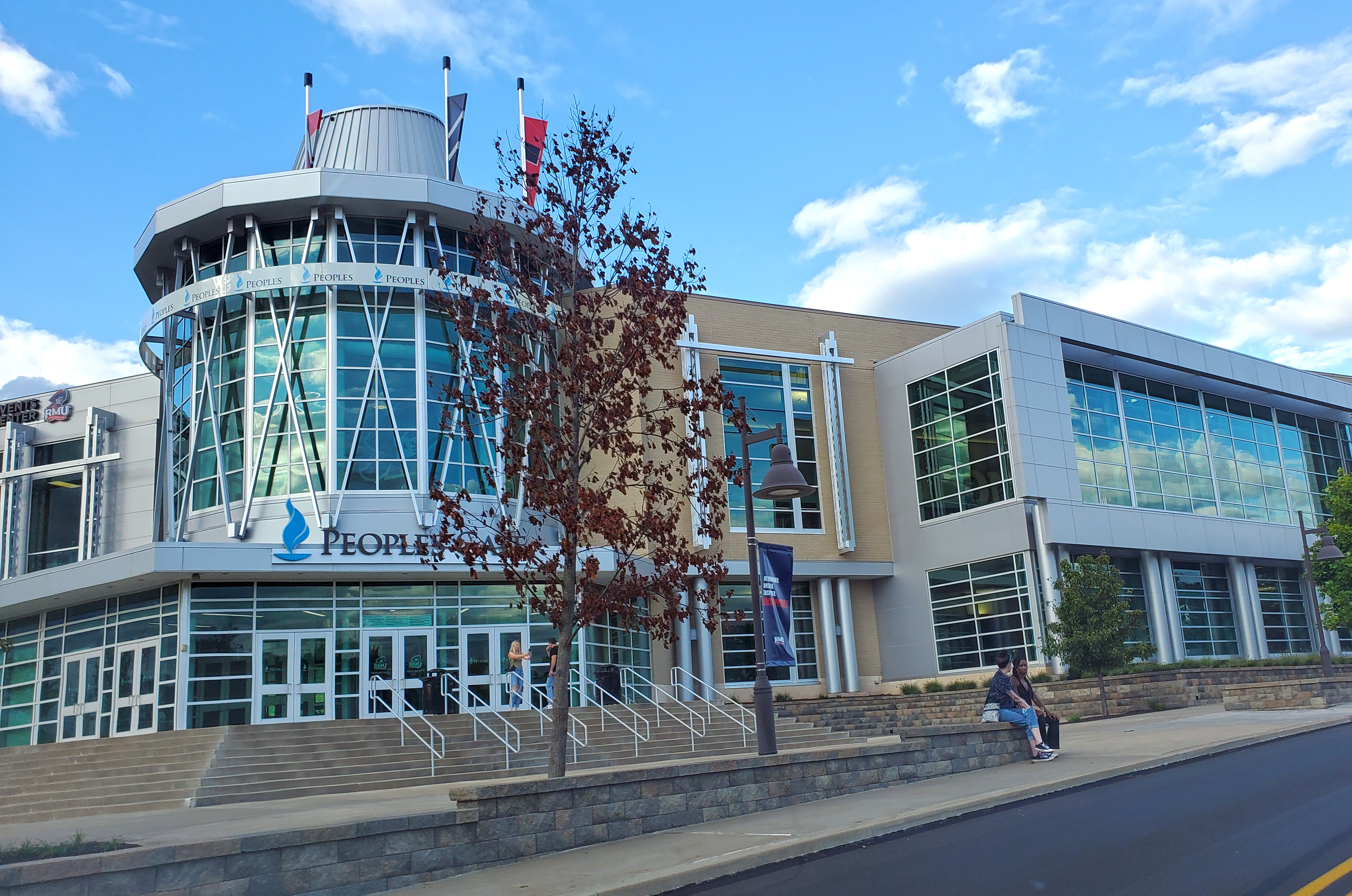
- Interactive map of UPMC Events Center
- Full name: UPMC Events Center
- Location: Moon, Pennsylvania
- Coordinates: 40.520212°N 80.21476°W
- Owner: Robert Morris University
- Operator: Oak View Group Facilities
- Capacity: 4,000

Construction
- Groundbreaking: November 8, 2017
- Opened: May 10, 2019
- Cost: $50 million
- Architect: Ross Bianco Architecture
- General contractor: P. J. Dick Inc.

Tenant
- Robert Morris Colonials (NCAA)

Website
- https://www.upmceventscenter.com

UPMC Events Center is an indoor arena located in the Pittsburgh suburb of Moon, Pennsylvania as a part of Robert Morris University, replacing the old Charles L. Sewall Center. The UPMC Events Center is the home of the Robert Morris Colonials men's and women's NCAA Division I basketball and women's volleyball teams. Originally scheduled to open in January 2019, the arena eventually opened in May 2019 after the men's basketball team announced all of their 2018–19 games would be played at the North Athletic Complex on campus.

In 2013, a survey was conducted to see if a new sporting and athletic center would be wanted for the university and in 2016, the survey results concluded in an overwhelming favor for the construction of a new sports center.

Acts that have performed more than once at the venue include Bob Dylan, Pierce the Veil, Motionless in White, Donnie Iris and The Cruisers, Tedeschi Trucks Band, The Clarks, The Vindys, Knocked Loose, and NEEDTOBREATHE.

== Facilities ==
The UPMC Events Center offers free weight and aerobic exercising rooms used for weightlifting and fitness classes. There are also two more rooms that offer sports such as yoga and wellness programs for students, as well as space for training recreational sports such as basketball, volleyball and indoor soccer. This facility is also fitted with locker rooms, private showering areas, office space and private lockers for the three NCAA Division I teams: men's and women's basketball and women's volleyball.

The facilities in this sports center are also used as a venue for conventions, public speakers, expos, concerts, and graduation ceremonies.

== Events ==
=== Sports ===
On March 21, 2019, it was announced that the first basketball game to be held at the arena would be played between Robert Morris and the Pittsburgh Panthers on November 12. This was the 31st matchup between the two teams, with Pitt having won all 30 previous meetings, all of which had been held at Pitt's Petersen Events Center or Fitzgerald Field House. Pitt won the game 71-57 in front of a sold-out crowd. The arena hosted its first conference championship game on March 10, 2020 when the Colonials defeated the St. Francis Red Flash to win the Northeast Conference title, also played before a sold-out crowd of over 4,000. The attendance record, previously jointly held by the aforementioned two games, was broken on March 6, 2025, when 4,058 fans saw RMU defeat the Wright State Raiders in the quarterfinals of the Horizon League tournament.

=== Concerts ===
List of concerts held at the arena
Date	Artist	Opening act(s)	Tour/Concert name	Ref.
May 12, 2019	Evanescence	Veridia	—N/a	
August 11, 2019	Why Don't We	EBEN	8 Letters Tour	
August 14, 2019	Bryan Adams	—N/a	Shine a Light	
August 16, 2019	The Doobie Brothers	—N/a	—N/a	
October 14, 2019	The Head and the Heart	—N/a	Living Mirage Tour	
November 10, 2019	Bob Dylan	—N/a	Never Ending Tour	
November 15, 2019	Sara Bareilles	Emily King	Amidst the Chaos Tour	
January 21, 2020 (Note: This show was originally scheduled for November 22, 2019, but was postponed due to the band's lead singer, Jack Met, having streptococcal pharyngitis.)	AJR	—N/a	The Neotheater World Tour	
February 19, 2020	Tedeschi Trucks Band	The National Reserve	—N/a	
October 3, 2021	NEEDTOBREATHE	Switchfoot	Into The Mystery	
November 15, 2021	Bob Dylan	—N/a	Rough and Rowdy Ways World Wide Tour	
December 5, 2021	Playboi Carti	—N/a	Narcissist	
April 7, 2022	Motionless in White; Ice Nine Kills	Lilith Czar	Trinity of Terror Tour	
September 11, 2022	I Prevail	Pierce the Veil; Fit for a King; Yours Truly	True Power Tour	
September 22, 2022	Conan Gray	Kacy Hill	Superache Tour	
October 8, 2022	Earth, Wind & Fire	—N/a	North American Tour 2022	
October 16, 2022	Bring Me The Horizon	grandson Knocked Loose; Siiickbrain	Post Human USA Tour 2022	
December 17, 2022	The 1975	Miloe	At Their Very Best	
March 11, 2023	Donnie Iris & The Cruisers	The Clarks	—N/a	
March 22, 2023	Tedeschi Trucks Band	Myron Elkins	I Am The Moon	
May,1, 2023	Billy Idol	Kelsy Karter & The Heroines	North American Tour 2023	
June 16, 2023	The Used; Pierce the Veil	Don Broco; Girlfriends	Creative Control Tour	
June 26, 2023	Counting Crows	Dashboard Confessional	Banshee Season	
August 15, 2023	Incubus	Badflower; Paris Jackson	US Tour 2023	
September 8, 2023	BABYMETAL; Dethklok	Jason Richardson	THE BABYKLOK TOUR 2023	
September 16, 2023	Parker McCollum	Jackson Dean	—N/a	
September 17, 2023	Motionless in White	After the Burial; Alpha Wolf; Knocked Loose	Touring The End Of The World Tour 2023	
September 21, 2023	Lil Tjay	—N/a	Beat the Odds	
October 28, 2023	Cole Swindell	Nate Smith	The Twelve Tour	
November 8, 2023	NEEDTOBREATHE	Judah & The Lion	Caves World Tour	
March 16, 2024	Donnie Iris & The Cruisers	The Clarks; The Vindys	—N/a	
September 15, 2024	Porter Robinson	ericdoa	SMILE! :D World Tour	
September 17, 2024	Sum 41	The Interrupters; Many Eyes	Tour of the Setting Sum	
September 17, 2024	Lorna Shore	Whitechapel; Kublai Khan TX; Sanguisugabogg	—N/a	
October 26, 2024	Dropkick Murphys	Pennywise; The Scratch	North America Fall 2024	
October 29, 2024	The Black Crowes	Tash Neal	Happiness Bastards (The Reprise)	
February 18, 2025	Wallows	Deb Never	MODEL & More Tour	
March 13, 2025	The Driver Era	Thomas Day	Obsession Tour	
April 12, 2025	Spiritbox	Dying Wish; Loathe	Tsunami Sea North American Tour	
November 5, 2025	Chicago	—N/a	—N/a	
November 8, 2025	Seether; Daughtry	P.O.D. Kami Kehoe	—N/a	
November 19, 2025	All Time Low	Mayday Parade; Four Year Strong; The Paradox	EVERYONE'S TALKING!	
