= Little planet =

Little planet may refer to:

- Little planet effect, in photography
- Little Planet, a location in the video game Sonic CD
