= Wooden Alley =

- U.S. National Register of Historic Places
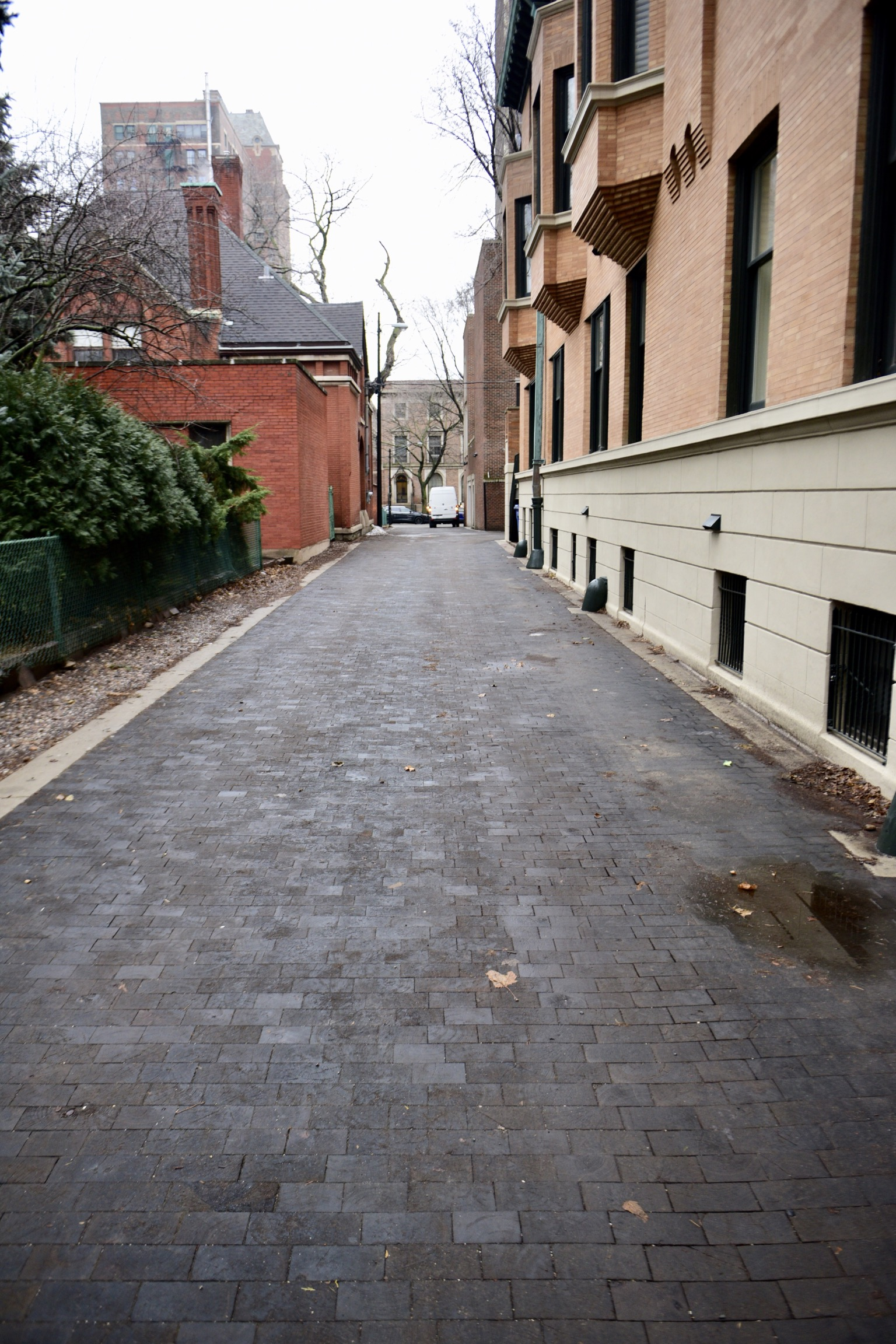

- Location within Chicago metropolitan area Location within Illinois Location within the United States
- Location: 1535 N bet. Astor and State Sts., Chicago, Illinois
- Coordinates: 41°54′37″N 87°37′42″W
- Area: less than one acre
- Built: 1909; 117 years ago
- Built by: Todd, Alexander
- Architectural style: Wooden Block Paving
- NRHP reference No.: 02000543
- Added to NRHP: May 22, 2002

Wooden Alley is a historic wood block paved alley connecting Astor Street and State Street in the Near North Side neighborhood of Chicago, Illinois. The alley is 530 feet (160 m) long and composed of wooden blocks roughly 6 to 10 inches (150 to 250 mm) long and 4 inches (100 mm) wide. This wood block technique is a derivative of Nicolson pavement, a more durable method of wooden paving which replaced plank paving in many U.S. cities in the nineteenth century. First paved in 1909, the alley is one of only two wooden alleys remaining in Chicago. Wooden paving was common in the late nineteenth century in Chicago, as the city's large lumber market made wood much cheaper than other paving materials. By 1909, however, a decline in the lumber market combined with the increased durability of other paving materials had caused the city to turn away from wooden paving, making the alley an unusually late example of the method.

The alley was added to the National Register of Historic Places on May 22, 2002.
