= Marc Lee Shannon =

Musician and sobriety advocate

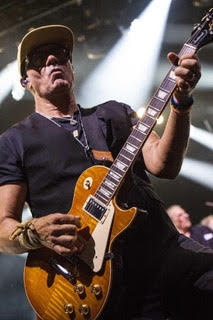

Marc Lee Shannon (born September 22, 1958) is an American singer-songwriter, guitarist, and author from Akron, Ohio who was a member of Michael Stanley's band the Resonators for more than 25 years. A person in long-term recovery, he is an advocate for people with substance use disorders and mental health issues.

== Early life and education ==
Shannon grew up in Akron and attended St. Sebastian's and St. Vincent-St. Mary's High School, where he was an active basketball player and golfer as well as a musician.

== Career ==
=== Early career ===
At the age of 19, Shannon moved to Los Angeles to attend the Guitar Institute of Hollywood, where he worked as a session musician for bands such as the Rave-Ups, as well as many other top club and studio bands. In an interview with the Canton Repository, he described himself as a “hired gun” who played on at least 100 different albums.

=== Work with Michael Stanley & the Resonators ===
After returning to Ohio following 11 years of touring and session work, Shannon contributed a guitar track to the song “Complicated” on Michael Stanley's 1996 album Coming Up for Air, after which he became a member of Michael Stanley & The Resonators.

Shannon played live with the Resonators and on 22 of their albums, providing electric, acoustic, baritone, and 12-string guitar and mandolin accompaniment. In 2017, Stanley estimated that the Resonators played an average of 25 shows per year.

After Stanley died in 2021, Shannon remained active in paying tribute to his memory. His third solo album featured the song “Steady On,” which Shannon released in Stanley's memory. Shannon also continues to perform numerous tribute concerts around Northeast Ohio with his fellow Resonators members.

=== Solo career ===
Shannon has released four solo albums. His 2008 blues-centered debut album Any Ordinary Man was produced by Stanley for Line Level Music.

In 2018, Shannon released Walk This Road. The album featured contributions from other Northeast Ohio artists, including Welshly Arms, The Vindys, and Ray Flanagan.

In 2021, Shannon released his third album Lucky 7, to commemorate his seven years of sobriety with seven “fun, funky pandemic-born songs.”

In 2024, Shannon released Marc Lee Shannon My Other Brothers. The band features members of The Michael Weber Show, Red Wanting Blue, and Easton Union.

=== Corporate career ===
Outside of his recording and performance work, Shannon worked at Marshall Amplification and Audio Technica, where he was named Vice President of Sales in 2003, and also served as the Senior Manager of Business Development at Harman Professional. He left the corporate world in 2014 to focus on his music.

== Sobriety and advocacy ==
A person in long-term recovery, Shannon is an Ohio Department of Mental Health and Addiction Services Certified Peer Recovery Supporter, volunteers at treatment centers and detox wards, and sits on the Board of Directors of the Summit County Alcohol, Drug Addiction, and Mental Health Services Board.

He is the host of Recovery Talks: The Podcast, where he “reveals the tactics, routines, and habits of musicians, business leaders, and world-class performers on their personal recovery journey.”

=== Sober Chronicles ===
In November 2022, Shannon released his first book, Sober Chronicles™: My Journey of Discovery on the Road to Recovery, composed of essays originally written for the Akron magazine The Devil Strip. An updated version of the book was released in November 2024, featuring new photos and other updates.

In November 2024, Shannon released an updated version of Sober Chronicles™: My Journey of Discovery on the Road to Recovery . The updated edition features additional photos, commentary, and a list of book discussion questions.

== Discography ==
=== Albums ===
- Solo
  - Any Ordinary Man (2008)
  - Walk This Road (2018)
  - Lucky 7 (2021)
  - My Other Brothers (2024)
- Michael Stanley & The Resonators
  - Coming Up For Air (1996)
  - In A Very Short Time (2016)
  - Eighteen Down (2000)
  - Stolen Time (2017)
  - The Farrago Sessions (2006)
  - Just Another Night (2008)
  - Live At Tangiers (1998)
  - And Then... (2015)
  - The Ride (2013)
  - American Road (2005)
  - Shadowland (2009)
  - The Job (2014)
  - Tough Room (2021)
  - Tis The Season (2009)
  - The Ground (2003)
  - The Soft Addictions (2007)
  - The Hang (2012)
  - MS – Live 2K (2000)
  - Michael Stanley & The Resonators Instant Live – Tower City Amphitheater (2004)
- JD Eicher
  - Court Street (2020)
  - Majesto Sessions (2022)
- The Rave Ups
  - Book of Your Regrets (1987)

=== Singles ===
- Friends Like You (2019)
- Let It Go (2020)
- Steady On (2021)
