= Nicolson pavement =

Type of wooden road surface

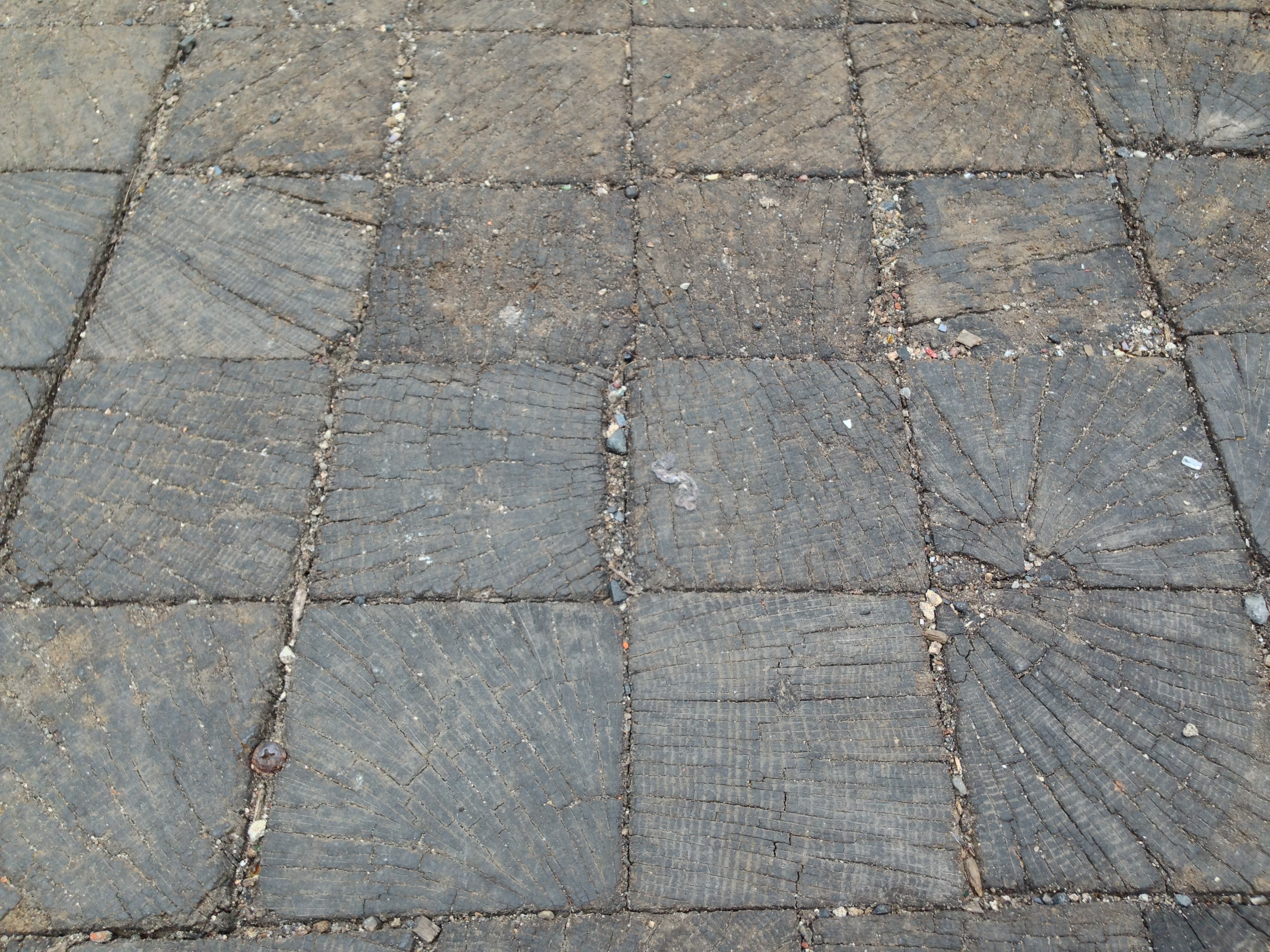
Wood block pavement

Nicolson pavement, alternatively spelled "Nicholson" and denominated wooden block pavement and wood block pavement, is a road surface material consisting of wooden blocks. Samuel Nicolson invented it in the mid-19th century. Wooden block pavement has since become unfavored because of its poor surface quality and high cost of maintenance.

== History ==
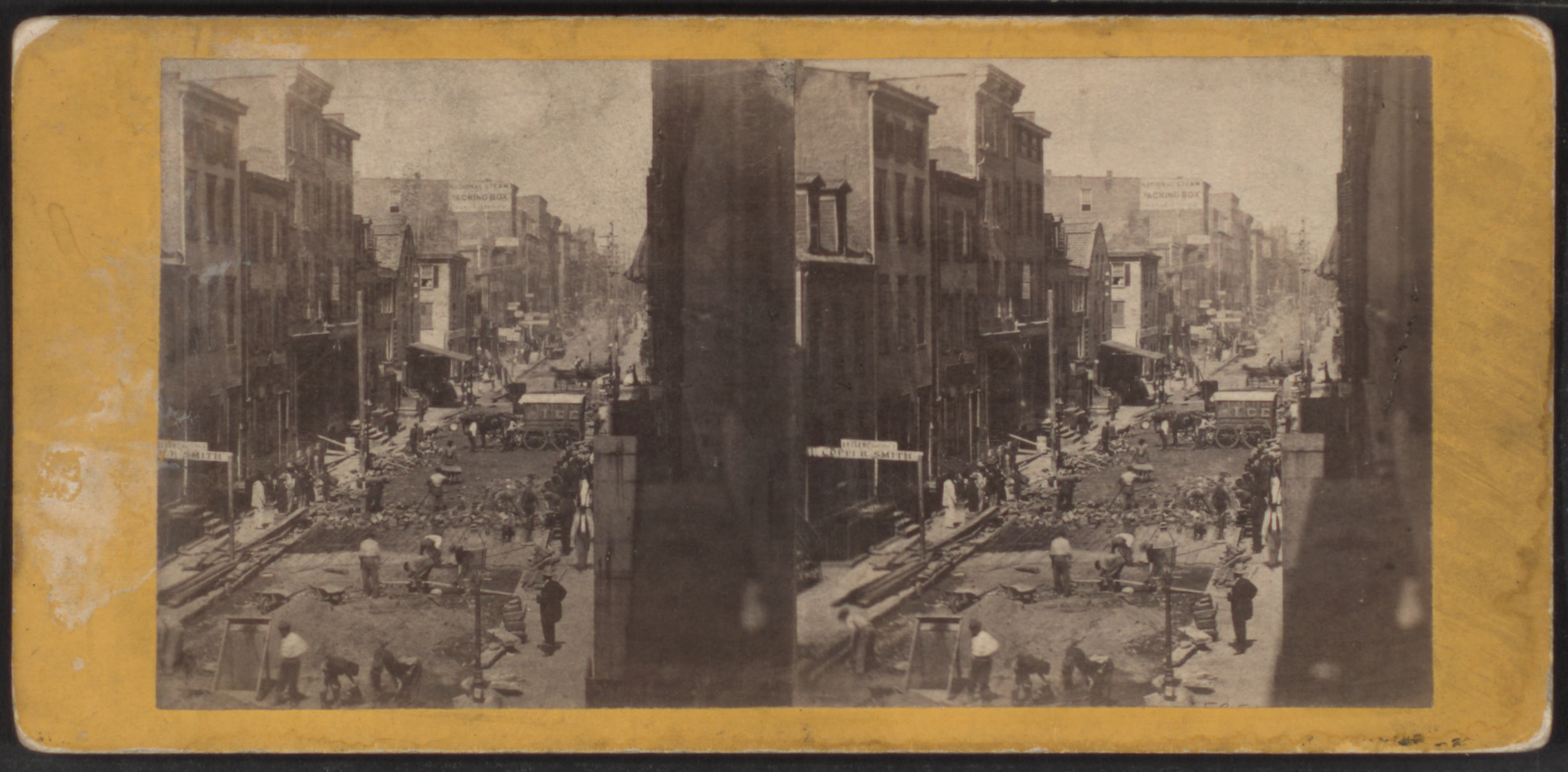
Laying the Nicolson pavement in Mercer St, New York, by E. & H.T. Anthony

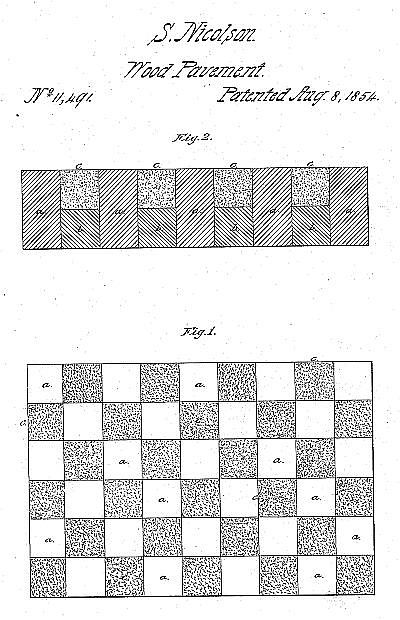
Patent Drawing of Nicolson's Pavement

Wood block pavement may have originated in Russia in the 14th century, but it gained prominence in the 1820s and 1830s as a road building alternative to the irregularly surfaced cobblestone streets common during that era. Wood block was also favored because stone was scarce and wood was abundant. Additionally, horse traffic reportedly made less noise on wood-surfaced streets. However, the drawbacks of Nicolson pavement include slippery surfaces when wet or icy, and the tendency of the blocks to rot, decay, and heave due to moisture seeping between the blocks. For example, the 1910 Great Flood of Paris caused substantial damage to inundated streets when the wood blocks floated and became dislodged. When treated with creosote, wood block pavement would last longer, but the creosoted pavement had a noticeable unpleasant smell.

M. Gourieff introduced [to St. Petersburg] the hexagonal wooden pavement with which, in London, we are all acquainted. This, with continuous reparation, answers pretty well, taking into consideration that equality of surface seems utterly unattainable, that the knavish contractors supply blocks so rotten as to be worthless a few days after they are put down, and that the horses are continually slipping and frequently falling on the perilous highway. It is unpleasant, also, to be semi-asphyxiated each time you take your walks abroad, by the fumes of the infernal pitch-cauldrons, round which the moujik workmen gather, like witches.

— George Augustus Sala, A Journey Due North, 1856

Nicolson pavement was the focus of a Supreme Court case, City of Elizabeth v. American Nicholson Pavement Co. which held that while the public use of an invention more than one year prior to the inventor's application for a patent normally causes the inventor to lose his right to a patent, there is an exception to this rule for public uses for experimental purposes.

== Remnants ==
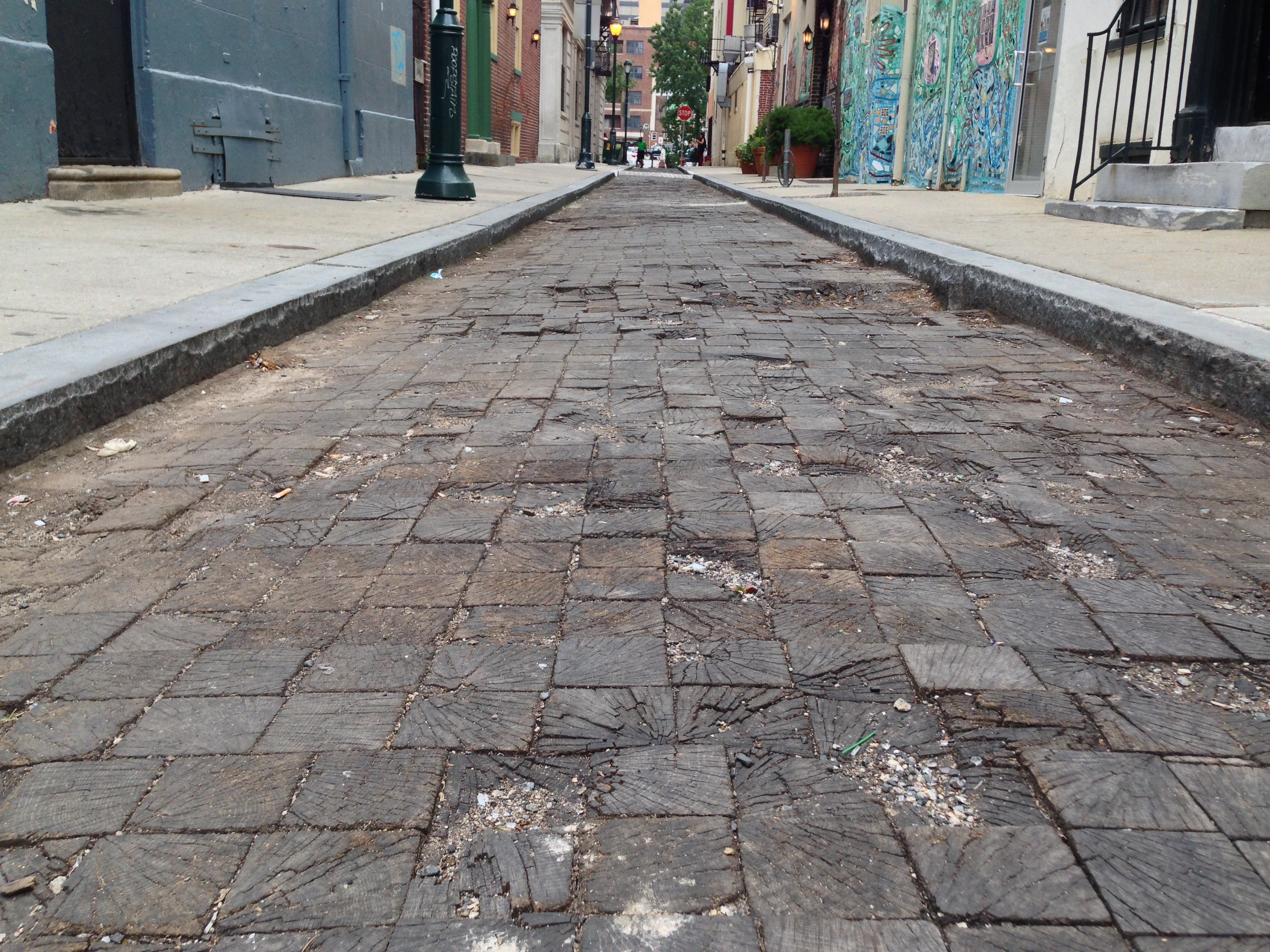
Wood block pavement at the 200 block of South Camac Street in Philadelphia

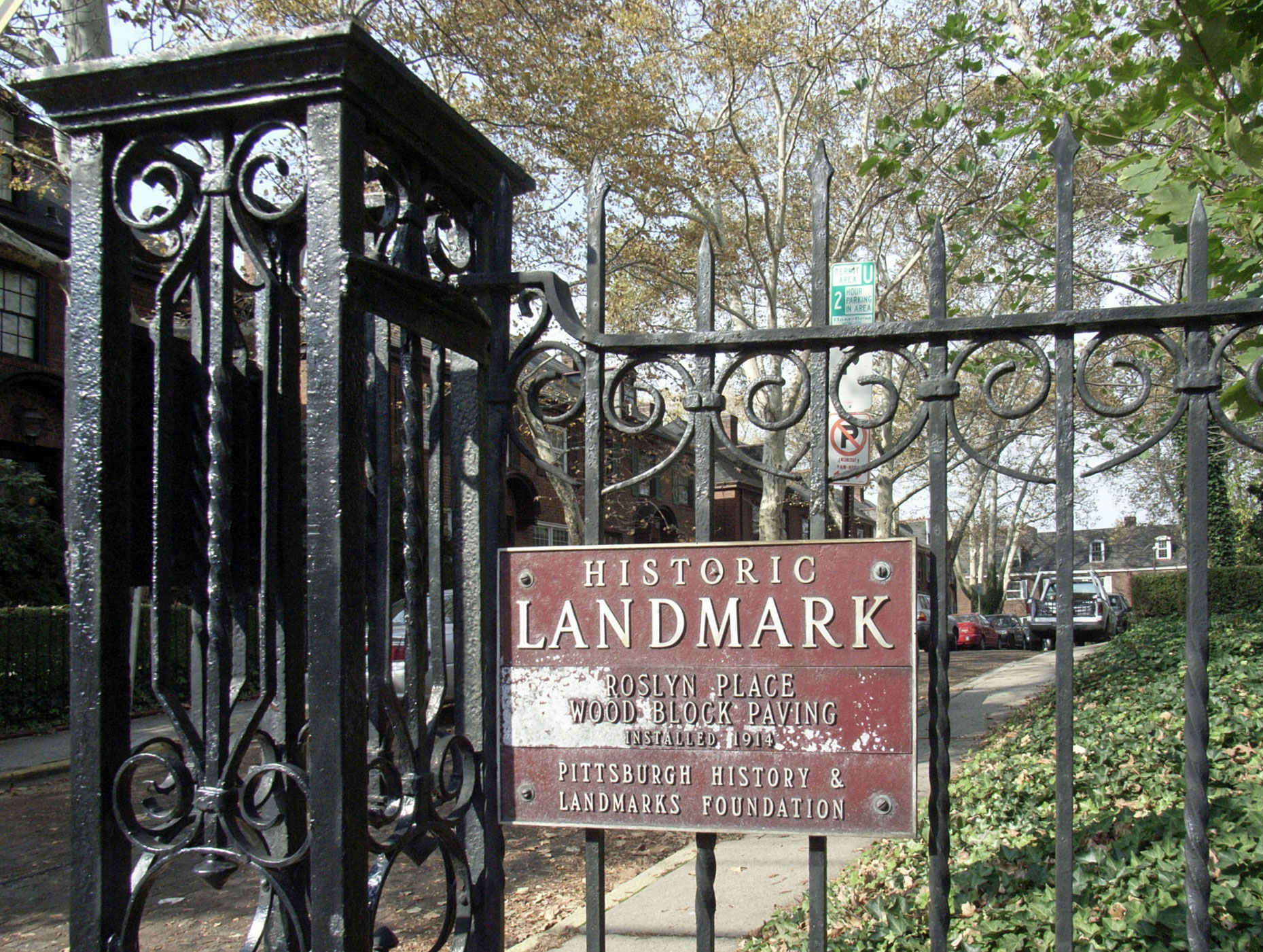
Historic Landmark plaque for Nicolson pavement on Roslyn Place, Pittsburgh, Pennsylvania

Remnants of Nicolson pavement still exist in several cities across the US. Touted as the only remaining wooden street in the US, Roslyn Place in Pittsburgh, Pennsylvania, is completely paved in wooden blocks. In addition, patches of creosoted wooden block pavement are still visible in an alley along 10th street between Olive and Locust Streets in St. Louis, Missouri,. In Chicago, Illinois, Wooden Alley still retains the use of wood block pavement, while a few other wooden alleys in Chicago remain in states of disrepair. The 200 block of Camac Street in Philadelphia, Pennsylvania, is also paved with wooden blocks, and it is regularly maintained, having been listed in the Philadelphia Register of Historic Places. Hessler Court in Cleveland, Ohio, previously known for its Hessler Street Fair, likewise maintains its Nicolson Pavement for historic reasons. In 2009, a series of wood block pavers were installed in Wall Street in New York City from Broadway to William Street. The locations of the pavers follow the exact path of the Dutch wooden defense wall that gave the street its name.

== See also ==
- Sett
