= Sonic CD =

1993 video game

- North American cover art
- Developer: Sega
- Publisher: Sega
- Director: Naoto Ohshima
- Producers: Minoru Kanari; Makoto Oshitani
- Programmer: Matsuhide Mizoguchi
- Artists: Hiroyuki Kawaguchi; Kazuyuki Hoshino
- Composers: Original release: Naofumi Hataya; Masafumi Ogata; North America: Spencer Nilsen; David Young; Sterling Crew
- Series: Sonic the Hedgehog
- Platforms: Sega CD; Windows; Android; PlayStation 3; Xbox 360; iOS; Apple TV
- Release: September 23, 1993: Sega CD; JP: September 23, 1993; WW: November 23, 1993 Windows; JP: August 9, 1996; NA: September 20, 1996; EU: October 3, 1996 Android, PS3, Xbox 360; WW: December 14, 2011 iOS; WW: December 15, 2011 Windows - remake; WW: January 19, 2012 Apple TV; WW: March 31, 2016
- Genre: Platform
- Mode: Single-player

Sonic CD, also known as Sonic the Hedgehog CD, (Note: Japanese: ソニック・ザ・ヘッジホッグCD(シーディー), Hepburn: Sonikku za Hejjihoggu Shī Dī) is a 1993 platform game developed and published by Sega for the Sega CD. As Sonic the Hedgehog, the player attempts to protect an extraterrestrial body, Little Planet, from Doctor Robotnik. Like other Sonic games, Sonic runs through themed levels while collecting rings and defeating robots. Sonic CD introduces time travel as a game mechanic. By traveling through time, players can access different versions of stages, featuring alternative layouts, music, and graphics. Sonic CD introduced the characters Amy Rose and Metal Sonic.

Sonic CD began as a port of the Sega Genesis game Sonic the Hedgehog (1991), but developed into a separate project. Led by Sonic's co-creator Naoto Ohshima, the developers sought to showcase the technical capabilities of the Sega CD, with animated cutscenes by Studio Junio and Toei Animation and CD-quality music. The soundtrack, influenced by house and techno, was composed by Naofumi Hataya and Masafumi Ogata. For North America, a new soundtrack was composed by Spencer Nilsen, David Young, and Sterling Crew.

Sonic CD was released in late 1993. It received positive reviews and is often regarded as one of the best Sonic games. Reviewers praised its size, music, and time travel feature, although some felt it did not fully use the Sega CD's capabilities. It sold over 1.5 million copies, making it the best-selling Sega CD game. Sonic CD was ported to Windows in 1996 and to the PlayStation 2 and GameCube as part of Sonic Gems Collection in 2005. A remake, developed by Christian Whitehead using the Retro Engine, was released for various platforms in 2011 and as part of the Sonic Origins compilation in 2022.

== Gameplay ==
(Clockwise from top left) The past, present, good future, and bad future variants of the Palmtree Panic level

Sonic CD is a side-scrolling platform game similar to the original Sonic the Hedgehog (1991). Players control Sonic the Hedgehog as he ventures to stop his nemesis Doctor Robotnik from obtaining the magical Time Stones and conquering Little Planet. Like previous games, Sonic can destroy enemies and objects (such as certain walls and television monitors containing power-ups) by rolling into a ball, and collects rings as a form of health. Sonic can also perform a "spin dash" and a "super peel-out", both of which increase his speed. Each of the seven levels are split into three zones, the third of which ends in a boss fight against Robotnik. Players start with three lives, which are lost when they suffer any type of damage without rings in their possession; losing all lives results in a game over.

Sonic CD is differentiated from other Sonic games through its time travel system, which allows players to access different versions of rounds set in the past, present, and future. The music also changes within the different time zones, as remixes of the present music. Sonic starts the first two zones in the present. The third zone is always set in the future, its timeline dependent upon whether the player destroyed both transporters in the past. He travels through time by hitting signs labelled "past" or "future", maintaining his speed afterward. By default, future stages are neglected and littered with machinery after Robotnik has conquered the Little Planet, appropriately named "bad futures." Players are encouraged to convert each zone into a "good future", with bright colors, thriving nature, and few enemies. To achieve a good future in each zone, players must travel to the past and destroy a hidden transporter where enemy robots spawn. Achieving a good future in every zone unlocks the best ending.

By finishing a level with more than 50 rings, Sonic can access a special stage, in which he must destroy six UFOs in a pseudo-3D environment within a time limit. Time is reduced swiftly if the player runs through water, though a special UFO that appears when time is running out grants extra time if destroyed. If the player destroys all the UFOs before the time runs out, they earn a Time Stone. Collecting all seven Time Stones automatically creates a good future in every zone, unlocking the best ending. In the time attack mode, players can replay levels for the fastest time possible; a "D.A. Garden", where players can listen to the music of completed zones; and a "Visual Mode", where players can view the opening and closing animations. The save feature uses the back-up memory of the Sega CD.

== Plot ==
At Never Lake, an extraterrestrial body, Little Planet, appears in the last month of every year. Sonic's nemesis, Dr. Robotnik, has chained the planet to a mountain and begun transforming it into a giant fortress with his robot army. To execute his plan, Robotnik uses the Time Stones, seven diamonds which control the flow of time, hidden in the different zones. Sonic ventures to the planet, followed by the besotted Amy Rose, his self-proclaimed girlfriend. (Note: In the North American manual, Amy is incorrectly identified as Princess Sally, a character from DIC's Sonic the Hedgehog television series.) Robotnik dispatches his newest invention, Metal Sonic, to kidnap Amy at Collision Chaos, luring Sonic into danger.

After fighting and outrunning Metal Sonic in Stardust Speedway and saving Amy, Sonic fights and defeats Robotnik in his lair, Metallic Madness. Two endings exist, depending on whether or not the player collected the Time Stones or achieved a good future in each level. In the good ending, Little Planet thanks Sonic with a shower of stars and leaves Never Lake; in the bad ending, Little Planet still leaves, but Robotnik uses the Time Stones to bring it back and the player is urged to replay the game to achieve the good ending.

== Development ==
=== Background and conception ===
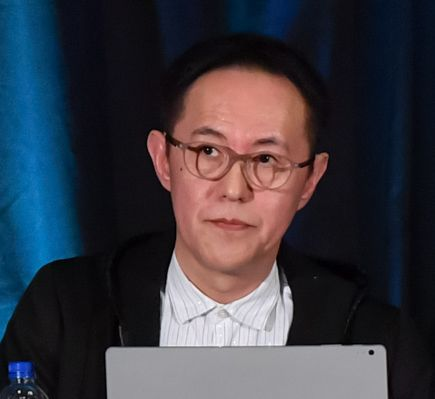
Sonic CD director Naoto Ohshima at the 2018 Game Developers Conference

The original Sonic the Hedgehog (1991) was developed by Sonic Team at Sega. It was a major commercial success and positioned Sega as Nintendo's main rival in the console market. The lead programmer, Yuji Naka, dissatisfied with Sega of Japan's rigid corporate policies, moved with several members of Sonic Team to the United States to develop Sonic the Hedgehog 2 with Sega Technical Institute (STI). Meanwhile, Sega planned to release the Sega CD add-on for its Genesis, and wanted a Sonic game that would demonstrate its more advanced features. Naoto Ohshima, the designer of Sonic, was Sonic CD's director; the remainder of the team comprised Sega staff who had developed The Revenge of Shinobi, Golden Axe II, and Streets of Rage. The team built Sonic CD using the original Sonic the Hedgehog code as a base.

Sonic CD was conceived as an enhanced port of Sonic the Hedgehog for the Sega CD, but it gradually developed into a separate project. It was titled CD Sonic the Hedgehog before being renamed Sonic CD. Ohshima does not consider Sonic CD a sequel to Sonic the Hedgehog or Sonic 2, although the artist Yasushi Yamaguchi said its story may be set between the two.

=== Design ===
Sonic the Hedgehog had a balance on speed and platforming; STI built on the speed with Sonic 2's more focused level designs. However, Ohshima's team sought to focus on the platforming and exploration aspects. Ohshima said, "our ideas were to make the world and setting larger, and to add more replayability, so it would be something you could enjoy playing for a long time". According to artist Kazuyuki Hoshino, because it was a Sega CD game, the team wanted Sonic CD to stand out compared to previous Sonic games. The visuals were designed to resemble CG imagery; the Sonic sprite on the title screen was based on a Sonic figurine by Taku Makino that the team photographed and scanned.

Sonic CD marks the debuts of Amy Rose and Metal Sonic, both designed by Hoshino. Although Hoshino created Amy's in-game graphics, many staff members contributed ideas to her design. Her headband and trainer shoes reflected Ohshima's tastes while her mannerisms reflected the traits Hoshino looked for in women at the time. Hoshino designed Metal Sonic in response to Ohshima wanting a strong rival for Sonic. Hoshino had a clear image of Metal Sonic in his mind from the moment he was briefed, and his design emerged after only a few sketches. The character graphics were created using Sega's proprietary graphics system for the Genesis, the "Sega Digitizer MK-III", featuring a bitmap and animation editor. The team mostly used Macintosh IIcis. Graphics data was stored on 3.5-inch floppy disks, which were handed to the programmer to work into the game. Though Naka was not directly involved with Sonic CD, he exchanged design ideas with Ohshima.

Ohshima cited the film Back to the Future (1985) as an influence on the time travel. The developers designed four variants of each stage, one for each time period. Ohshima hoped for the period to change instantly with a "sonic boom" effect, but the programmers argued this was impossible and produced a loading sequence instead. Sega did not pressure the team developing Sonic CD as much as the one developing Sonic 2. Ohshima felt this was because Sonic CD is not a numbered sequel; he considered it a recreation of the original game. The total Sonic CD game data is 21 megabytes (MB), compared to Sonic 2's 1 MB. Sonic CD includes animated cutscenes animated by Studio Junio and produced by Toei Animation. The videos used the STM format, which provided uncompressed imagery to the video display processor, creating better results than the Cinepak compression used for other Sega CD games. The special stages feature Mode 7-like background plane manipulation effects. An underground dungeon stage was cut early in development as it did not fit the Sonic gameplay.

=== Music ===
The Sonic CD soundtrack was composed by Naofumi Hataya and Masafumi Ogata. According to Hataya, Sega allocated a large audio budget to showcase the audio functionality of the Sega CD, aiming for CD-quality music superior to video game music of the time. The team worked with the Japanese music production company Being, and enlisted Keiko Utoku to provide vocals. The music was recorded in the Being studios.

Hataya and Ogata's first demos were rejected by Ohshima, who wanted a more bold, experimental sound. They instead composed music inspired by the increasing popularity of house and techno in Japan, citing inspiration from acts including C+C Music Factory, Frankie Knuckles, and the KLF. They were also inspired by the popularity of Sonic in British DJ culture at the time. The team composed music to match the past, present, and future versions of each stage. While most tracks use CD audio, the past stages use sample-based PCM tracks to evoke a "prehistoric" feeling. An album of remixes by Hataya and Ogata was released in Japan in late 1994.

Sega of America delayed the North American release of Sonic CD by two months to have a new soundtrack, to have its own soundtrack, with the American released composed by Spencer Nilsen and David Young, with the addition of the boss music and the themes for the Collision Chaos and Metallic Madness stages by Sterling Crew (credited only as Sterling) with the participation of musicians Armando Peraza and Bobby Vega. Nilsen said Sega of America "wanted something a little more musically rich and complex", with a theme song they could use in marketing. The new theme song, "Sonic Boom", was composed by Nilsen and performed by the female vocal trio Pastiche. Den of Geek described the American soundtrack as "more orchestral and 'rocking' ... a bit more 'epic' and almost mournful", with "a sense of dread" compared to the "bouncy and joyful" Japanese soundtrack. Nilsen said the 2 soundtracks represented "completely different musical philosophies and approaches".

== Release ==
Sonic CD was released in Japan on September 23, 1993, After being delayed for the new soundtrack, it was released in North America and Europe on November 23, 1993, alongside Sonic Chaos and Sonic Spinball as part of Sega of America's "Sonic Three on One Day" release strategy. Sonic CD was the flagship game for Sega CD and its only Sonic game. In France, Sega later bundled Sonic CD and Road Avenger with the Mega-CD II, with the package launching on June 1, 1994 for 1,190 francs. An enhanced version of the original Sonic the Hedgehog and a Sonic-themed port of Popful Mail were canceled.

=== Re-releases ===
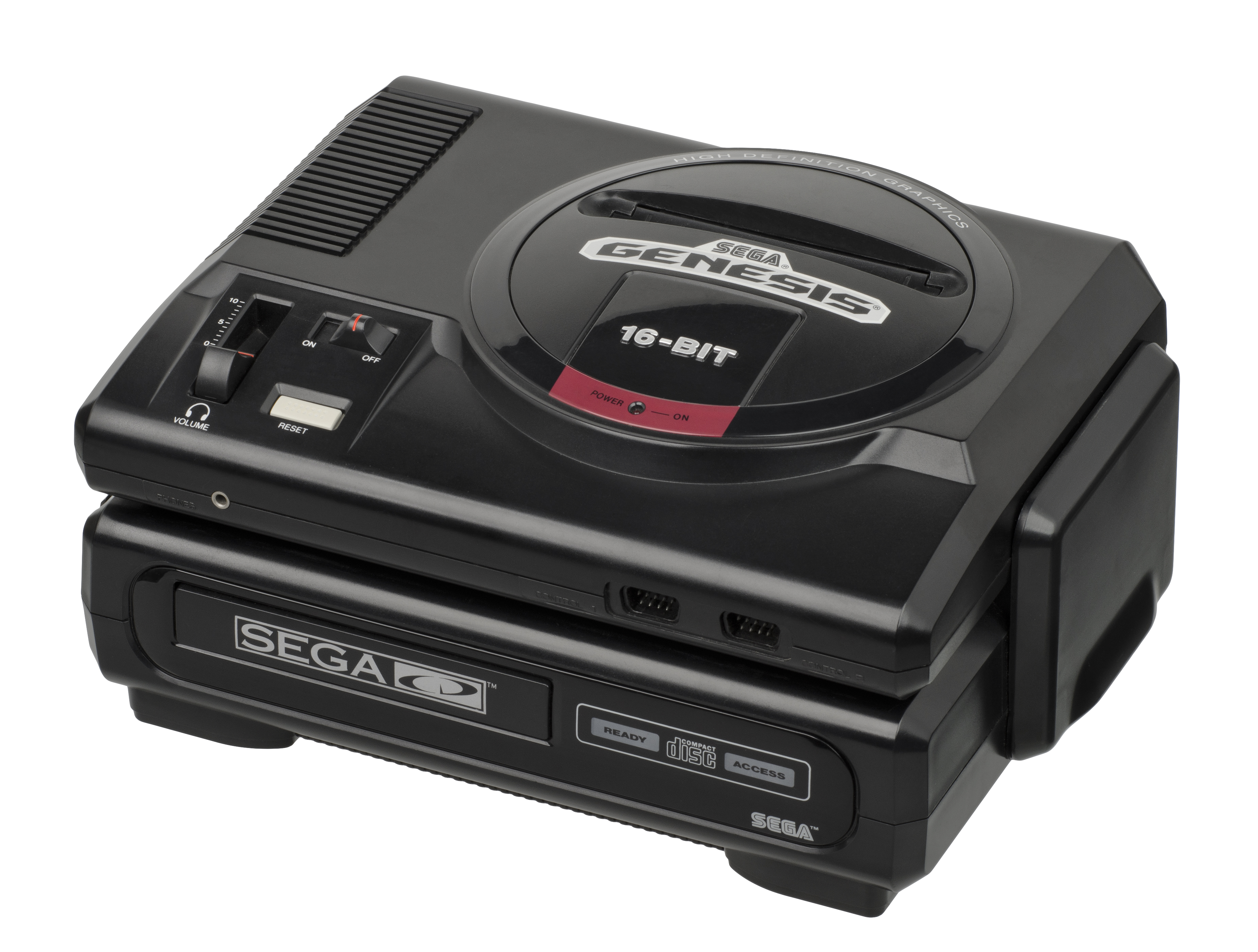
Sonic CD was originally released for the Sega CD (seen here attached below the Genesis).

Two versions of Sonic CD were released for Windows: one in 1995 for Pentium processors, and another in 1996 for DirectX. The Pentium version was only bundled with new computers and never sold in stores; Sega worked with Intel to make the game work properly. The DirectX version was released under the Sega PC label and it was released in Japan on August 9, 1996, and in North America on September 20, 1996. This version is mostly identical to the original release, but loading screens were added and it is only compatible with older versions of Windows. Both Windows versions use the North American soundtrack.

The 1996 Windows version was ported to the GameCube and PlayStation 2 in August 2005 for Sonic Gems Collection. This port uses the original soundtrack in Japan and the North American soundtrack elsewhere. The ports introduced some graphical problems, such as a blurry anti-flicker presentation, but the opening animation is presented in a higher quality fullscreen view.

In 2009, the independent developer Christian Whitehead produced a proof-of-concept video of a remastered version of Sonic CD, using his Retro Engine running on iOS. Sega released this version in December 2011 for Android, iOS, PlayStation 3, and Xbox 360, and in January 2012 on Steam, with assistance from BlitWorks in the PC and console ports. The remake features enhancements such as widescreen graphics, fine-tuned collision detection to make time traveling more consistent, refined visuals and frame rate for Special Stages, the option for spin dash physics from Sonic the Hedgehog 2, both the Japanese and North American soundtracks, the ability to unlock Tails as a playable character, and achievement and trophy support. Whitehead designed two original stages, but they were excluded as Sega wanted to keep the game faithful to the original release. The remake was not released on the Wii as it exceeded the WiiWare download size. It was included in the 2022 compilation Sonic Origins, which removed voice lines for Sonic and Amy. Amy and Knuckles also became selectable characters in a later update to Origins.

== Reception ==
Reception (Sega CD)

Review scores
Publication	Score
Computer and Video Games	85%
Electronic Gaming Monthly	9/10, 9/10, 8/10, 8/10
GameFan	100%, 100%, 100%, 100%
GamePro	5/5
Electronic Games	92%
Entertainment Weekly	A−
Sega Force Mega	85%
Sega Magazine	87%
Sega Pro	90%

Awards
Publication	Award
Electronic Gaming Monthly	Best Sega CD Game of 1993
GamePro	Best CD Game of 1993

The Sega CD version sold more than 1.5 million copies, making it the system's best-seller. In the United Kingdom, it was the top-selling Mega-CD game in December 1993.

Sonic CD received acclaim. The presentation, visuals, and audio were praised. Computer and Video Games wrote that, although Sonic CD did not use the Sega CD's capabilities to its fullest, the graphics and sound were excellent, calling the music "from the likes of 2 Unlimited and Bizarre Inc". Electronic Games said that it looked similar to previous Sonic games and made minimal use of the Sega CD features, but this did not detract from the quality. The reviewer felt its music added richness and made Sonic CD stand out The reviewers of Electronic Gaming Monthly (EGM) praised the animated cinematics and sound, but noted frame rate drops during special stages. Retrospective opinions of the presentation have also been positive. IGN praised its vibrant colors, and GamesRadar thought its music had aged well, writing: "What must've dated very quickly in the 1990s is somehow totally fresh today."

Critics were divided over the North American soundtrack. GameFan, which had given the Japanese version of Sonic CD a score of 100%, lambasted the change. In 2009, GameFan editor Dave Halverson called it "an atrocity that remains the biggest injustice in localization history". The reviewer for GamesRadar said he shut his GameCube off in disgust when he realized Sonic Gems Collection used the American soundtrack. Nilsen said the criticism was "blown out of proportion", as if they had "replaced the music for Star Wars after the movie had been out for a while".

The gameplay was praised. EGM admired the diverse levels and felt the time travel added depth. Electronic Games wrote that Sonic CD played as well as previous Sonic games, and that the time travel—coupled with large levels rich with secrets and Super Mario Kart-like special stages—added replayability. Sega Pro also noted the expanded environments and the replay value travel added by the time travel, writing that "the more you play Sonic CD the better it gets", but felt it was too easy. In its debut issue, Sega Magazine said Sonic CD was "potentially a classic". GameSpot singled out the "interesting level design and the time-travelling gameplay" as a major selling point, saying it provided a unique take on the classic Sonic formula.

Critics wrote that Sonic CD was one of the best Sega CD games. Electronic Games called it a must-have, and Sega Pro said it was "brilliant", imaginative and worth more than its price. Destructoid described it as "a hallmark of excellence", creative, strange, and exciting, and said that "to miss Sonic CD would be to miss some of the franchise's best".

Reception to later versions of Sonic CD varied. GameSpot considered the 1996 Windows version inferior, criticizing its technical performance and "tedious and monotonous" gameplay. The reviewer wrote that "those who have played Sonic on a Sega game system will find nothing new here" and that it was not worth its $50 price. Reviews of the version in Sonic Gems Collection were favorable. IGN remembered Sonic CD as one of the best things about the Sega CD and called it a standout for the compilation, and a major selling point. Eurogamer wrote: "Rejoice for Sonic CD... Just don't rejoice for anything else [in Sonic Gems Collection], because it's mostly rubbish." According to Metacritic, the 2011 console version received "generally favorable reviews", while the iOS version received "universal acclaim". Sonic CD is frequently named among the best Sonic games and platform games. In 1997, EGM named it the 17th-best console game, citing the bonus levels and animated intro.

== Legacy ==
The story of Sonic CD was adapted in the twenty-fifth issue of Archie Comics' Sonic the Hedgehog comic book series. The adaptation featured some changes to the story, such as Tails being an important character and Metal Sonic having the ability to talk. The British comic Sonic the Comic also published an adaptation. The final issue of Archie's comic, #290 (December 2016), also featured a retelling of the Sonic CD story.

Two characters introduced in Sonic CD, Amy Rose and Metal Sonic, became recurring characters in the Sonic series. Metal Sonic appeared as an antagonist in Knuckles' Chaotix (1995), the Sonic the Hedgehog OVA (1996), Sonic Heroes (2003), Sonic the Hedgehog 4: Episode II (2012), and Sonic Mania (2017). Amy Rose most notably appears in Sonic Adventure (1998). The Sonic CD animated sequences were included as bonuses in the compilations Sonic Jam (1997) and Sonic Mega Collection (2002), and "Sonic Boom" was used as one of Sonic's themes in Super Smash Bros. Brawl (2008).

In 2011, Sega released Sonic Generations in celebration of the franchise's 20th anniversary, which includes a remake of the boss battle against Metal Sonic. Sonic Mania, produced for the series' twenty-fifth anniversary, features updated versions of Sonic CD's Stardust Speedway and Metallic Madness levels, including a boss battle against Metal Sonic.

The 2027 film Sonic the Hedgehog 4 was presumed to be an adaptation of Sonic CD after the mid-credits scene from Sonic the Hedgehog 3 (2024) introduced Amy and Metal Sonic simultaneously. The director, Jeff Fowler, said he thought it "felt very cool to honor that chronology and have them simultaneously introduced". An excerpt from "Sonic Boom" is used in the teaser trailer.
