= John Bassette =

American singer-songwriter

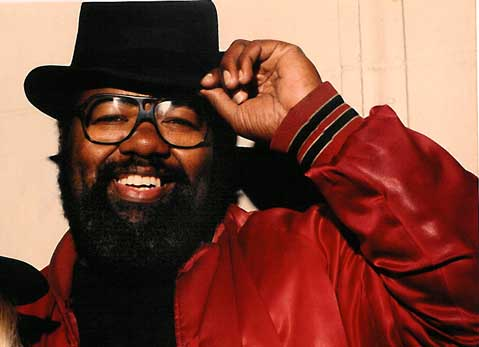
- John Bassette (photo by Todd Wieder)

Background information
- Born: December 28, 1941; Hampton, Virginia
- Died: November 9, 2006 (aged 64) Cleveland, Ohio
- Genres: Folk music
- Occupations: Singer/songwriter, poet and cable television personality
- Instrument: Guitar

John Bassette (December 28, 1941 – November 9, 2006) was a folk singer/songwriter, poet and cable television personality in the Greater Cleveland, Ohio, United States, area. He was born in Hampton, Virginia, USA.

== Musical career ==
Bassette first attracted national notice at the 1967 Newport Folk Festival, where critic Bradford F. Swan singled out his performance of his composition "Brown Boy" as "an immensely moving song, beautifully sung" and "the high point of the evening". Later that same year, he performed at Carnegie Hall at a "Sing Out" hootenanny sponsored by the magazine of the same name. He also performed that August at the legendary Bitter End on Bleecker Street, of which the New York Times music critic Dan Sullivan wrote, "Mr. Bassette, who knows what he is doing at all times, obviously enjoys it and ought to be able to make a good living at it in years to come."

Returning to Cleveland, Bassette produced three full-length albums, two mini-albums, and a self-illustrated book of stories, songs, essays and poetry entitled Losing Face in America. Bassette was a pioneer in the area of producing his own recordings and releasing them on his own label, something few musicians in the Cleveland area had done before. His first mini-album, Weed and Wine, produced by TinkerToo Music & Records, featured a cover by underground comic artist Dave Sheridan, and both the cover song and the song Hello, Cleveland were local hits. He appeared at many street fairs and events in the Northeast Ohio area, and favored benefits for charitable causes including the Cleveland Free Clinic. He also appeared as a regular guest on the seminal folk-music segment, Coffeebreak Concerts, on the major Cleveland Rock radio station WMMS. Bassette also appeared alongside Sammy Davis Jr. in the London company of Golden Boy. He hosted a cable TV show through Viacom in the mid-eighties under the name Jon Bon, and produced two music videos and a documentary on how to create videos on a tight budget.

== Writings ==
An article by John Bassette entitled “How to Copyright Your Songs” was published in Mother Earth News in 1970, and he published a collection of poetry and stories entitled Losing Face in America in 1978, including the poem "Golden Doves & Dolphins", reprinted in the Changeling Times in 1983 (along with a feature on him and his album Another Alternative called It's So Nice on Hessler Street).

== Death and Tributes ==
Bassette suffered a series of strokes during the 90s, and stayed first at St. Herman's House of Hospitality, then at St. Augustine Manor. A benefit concert for Bassette was organized by singer/songwriter Alex Bevan on May 19, 2005 at the Beachland Ballroom & Tavern in Cleveland, OH, featuring Jim Ballard, Charlie Wiener, Michael Stanley, Jim Schafer, and many others. Bevan compiled and released an album for the benefit entitled Rainbow Colored Clouds. This contained some Bassette favorites, as well as the previously unreleased title track. Bassette died in November 2006. In 2007 a tribute CD entitled Been Through So Much Together . Produced by Jim Ballard, it was released by Skylyne Productions. It featured many well-known Cleveland-area and other folk musicians and friends of Bassette, including Tom Paxton, Michael Stanley, Jim Ballard, Alex Bevan, Charlie Wiener, Jon Mosey, Pat Dailey, Don Dixon and Marti Jones, Jim Gill, Chuck Keith, Bill Lestock, Aaron Ballard, Benjamin Payne, Stick People, and Mo' Mojo Mama

== Discography ==
- 1971 The Loving Kind United Artists
- 1972 Weed and Wine (Mini-Album) Tinkertoo Music & Records
- 1972 This Time Around Tinkertoo Record B727 (A full-length LP with eleven songs including Next Time Around and John's Happy Song. At this time, Tinkertoo was still on Hessler Street in Cleveland.)
- 1976 Another Alternative Tinkertoo Music & Records (Tinkertoo had moved to Akron, Ohio.)
- 1977 The Sleeping Poet (EP) Tinkertoo Music & Records
- 1977 Every Day is Christmas From Now On / The Christmas Season 45 rpm single Tinkertoo Music and Records
- 1978 John Who? (aka John Richard Bassette) Tinkertoo Music & Records
- 1979 The Concert Album Tinkertoo Music & Records
- 1980 John Bassette Live at Hessler Street
- 1980 The Country Album - The Saga of the Emerald City Cowboy Busted Penny Limited
- 1986 Starwood Memories (live compilation) ACE
- 2002 Rainbow Colored Clouds released by Alex Bevan as part of benefit concert
- 2007 The Songs Of John Bassette~Been Through So Much Together (Tribute Album featuring various artists) Skylyne Records produced by Jim Ballard

== Written works ==
- 1970: “How to Copyright, Publish and Record a Song” Mother Earth News September 1970, available online here.
- 1978: Losing Face in America - Laughing Willow Productions
- 1983: "Golden Doves & Dolphins" - Changeling Times #9 (excerpt from Losing Face in America)

- The 1967 Newport Folk Festival
- The 1969 Philadelphia Folk Festival
- The Bitter End, New York NY, August 1967
- Patches & Liz's 15 Below, Timonium, MD, 1972
- Hessler Street Fair - Cleveland, OH
- Coventry Street Fair - Cleveland, OH
- 115th St. Fair - Cleveland, OH
- Case Western Reserve University Hillel House (Hillel: The Foundation for Jewish Campus Life) (Cleveland Free Clinic Benefit and Cellar Door Concert Series) Cleveland, OH
- Amazingrace Coffeehouse – Northwestern University, Evanston IL. 1973 & 1974
- Benefit concert for the Cleveland Urban Learning Community, WHK auditorium, 1977
- May 4 Kent State University Commemoration (1979) Kent, OH
- Summertunes Series Concert (w Tom Rush and Johnathan Edwards) July 7, 1979 - Antrim New Hampshire
- Starwood Festival (1982, 1984, 1985) New Philadelphia, OH
- Arabica Cafe - Cleveland Hts., OH
- Peabody's - Cleveland Hts., OH
- Notre Dame College, South Euclid, OH
- Boulder Junction - Uniontown, Ohio
- Room One Coffeehouse, John Carroll University, University Hts., Ohio
- Turkey Ridge Tavern - Cleveland Hts., OH
- The Rathskeller - John Carroll University, University Hts., Ohio (venue for 1976 live recording of The Concert Album)
- The Folk Ghetto, Norfolk, VA

== Articles about Bassette ==
- "It’s So Nice on Hessler Street" – Jeff Rosenbaum Changeling Times #6
- "Beloved Singer John Bassette is Dead at 64" – Michael Heaton – The Plain Dealer (Tuesday, November 14, 2006)
- "John Bassette 1941-2006" - Larry Bruner, et al. (November 2006) Folknet.org
- "John Bassette: Big Baritone, Big Heart" - Bill Gruber Akron Life & Leisure (February 2007)
