= Congo The Movie: The Lost City of Zinj =

1996 video game

Congo the Movie: The Lost City of Zinj
- Cover art
- Developer: Jumpin' Jack Software
- Publisher: Sega
- Platform: Saturn
- Release: NA: 1996
- Genre: First-person shooter
- Mode: Single-player

Congo the Movie: The Lost City of Zinj is a first-person shooter developed by American studio Jumpin' Jack Software and published by Sega for the Sega Saturn in 1996. The game uses elements of the film Congo to tell a side story following the exploits of Butembo Kabalo (played by Steven Anthony Jones), the only survivor of the first Travicom expedition in search of diamonds in the Congo jungle.

The game uses a completely original musical score, with no songs taken from the film soundtrack. The FMV segments were produced by A Commotion Pictures and use the TrueMotion S video codec.

== Reception ==
Reception

Review scores
Publication	Score
Electronic Gaming Monthly	5.125/10
Next Generation	2/5

Electronic Gaming Monthly's four reviewers differed in their opinions, but concurred on the points that the enemies looked too cartoonish and that the game as a whole "contributes nothing really new to the Doom genre." Tommy Glide of GamePro likewise deemed the game a dull Doom clone and described the enemies as "cartoony spiders, puppy-dog lizards, and giant rubber monkey dolls." He also criticized a number of annoyances such as the poison which reverses the directionals, the inability to hear enemies approaching, and the lack of depth in the graphics. A reviewer for Next Generation had a more nuanced reaction to the game, saying that it offers a surprisingly good concept, but also that it fails to effectively deliver on that concept. Like Tommy Glide, he criticized that the lack of depth in the graphics makes the game both visually unimpressive and confusing to play.
