= Alex Bevan =

American singer-songwriter

Alex Bevan (born 1950) is an American guitarist, singer, songwriter, poet, radio personality, and music producer.

== Early life ==
Bevan began his musical career playing the French horn with his teacher Ruffier at Chambers Elementary School. In 1965, while at Shaw High School in East Cleveland, he acquired a six-string classical guitar. He played local night clubs and various coffeehouses in the Cleveland area such as "La Cave" and "Faragher's Back Room". His first position in a group was as a backup musician with Irish folk singers Gusty & Sean at Fagan's Beacon House in the Flats of Cleveland, Ohio. While a student at the University of Akron, Bevan was introduced to his first producer, Eric Stevens, who signed him to Big Tree Records. His first album, No Truth to Sell, was released in 1971 along with the single "Linda's Song" b/w "Brady Street Hotel", which got some airplay. Between 1971 and 1979, Bevan performed as an opening act for such headliners as the Earl Scruggs Review, Pure Prairie League, The Nitty Gritty Dirt Band, Jerry Jeff Walker, Jimmy Buffett, The Clash, Bo Diddley, Livingston Taylor, Billy Joel and others.

== Musical career ==
The release of the album Springboard got him some public recognition due to the local hit song Skinny Little Boy. In 1977 he performed on the air on Cleveland's WMMS Radio with a band called Alex Bevan and the Buzzard Band, featuring DJ Matt the Cat on guitar. He performed in the mid-1970s with an acoustic trio consisting of two guitars and electric bass, and opened for such acts as Seals and Crofts, The Michael Stanley Band, The Doobie Brothers and Hall & Oates. He soon added David Krauss from the band Tiny Alice to the group, supplying percussion and harmonica. They toured either under the name Grand River Band or Alex Bevan and Friends from 1979 until 1981, and produced the albums The Grand River Lullaby, Alex Bevan and Friends Live, and Simple Things Done Well. In the early 80's Bevan produced the direct-to-disk digital solo album Tales of the Low Tech Troubadour Vol. 1. He played in the band Alex Bevan & Cuttlefish from 1984 through 1986. In the late 80s to early 90s, he produced the albums Best Kept Secrets, Cuttlefish Live, and Watersongs.

His latest releases include South Shore Serenade, Rules of the Road, Fall & Angels and Live at the Kent Stage. An avid producer of folk music, he has produced five recordings for the popular Put-in-Bay/Key West performer Pat Dailey, and written over one hundred radio and TV commercials. He still plays many venues, including the Hessler Street and Coventry Street Fairs in Greater Cleveland, Ohio, the Starwood Festival, Put-In Bay, the Burning River Festival, Cain Park, and Kelleys Island.

Bevan organized a benefit for fellow Cleveland area singer-songwriter John Bassette on 19 May 2002 at the Beachland Ballroom & Tavern in Cleveland, OH, featuring Jim Ballard, Charlie Wiener, Michael Stanley, Jim Schafer, and many others. In 2007 a tribute CD for Bassette, Been Through So Much Together: The Songs of John Bassette, was released by Skylyne Records, which featured Bevan and others. The tribute album was produced by Akron Songwriter and Producer and Bevan pal, Jim Ballard. Around the same time, Bevan released a posthumous collection of previously unreleased songs by John Bassette called Rainbow Colored Clouds. He also plays for the Roots of American Music Annual Benefit for Education.

== Radio ==
Bevan appeared on the premiere broadcast of Cleveland's WNCR Radio station's Sunday night live concerts from Agency Recording in 1971. He was a frequent guest artist on WMMS' Coffeebreak Concerts, and co-hosted a show with David Spero called A Folk Special for a Sunday Afternoon. He also hosted a Saturday morning radio show on WMMS Cleveland for a short time.

In 1988 Bevan did a series of musical radio advertisements for the Cleveland Browns. A new song each week of the season recapped the game from the week before and set up the upcoming game. Each week's song was in a different musical style.

== Children's programs ==
Bevan collaborated with David Young on his first children's album, a musical fairytale with an environmental message titled Who Killed the Dragon?. This was followed by two award-winning critically acclaimed works: Magic Moments from the Children's Nature Schoolhouse (produced for the Lake Metroparks) and All the Rivers Run (Produced for the Cuyahoga Valley Environmental Education Center).

== Personal life ==
Bevan and his wife Deidre reside in North Madison, Ohio. Bevan has a son named William Cody Bevan, from a prior marriage. The couple owned and operated two businesses: a line of home-grown gourmet pickles called Skinny Pickles and Stone Dragon Bakery. Those businesses are now closed.

== Awards ==
Bevan won an Emmy award for his postscore of The Rustbelt Blues (1987), the final segment of NBC’s American Promise documentary series.

== Discography ==
- No Truth to Sell (1971) Big Tree Records
- Springboard (1976) Fiddler's Wynde (CD reissued by Little Fish Records)
- The Grand River Lullaby (1978) Fiddler's Wynde (CD reissued by Little Fish Records)
- Alex Bevan and Friends Live: Come for to See You...Come for to Sing! (1980)
- Simple Things Done Well (1981) Fiddler's Wynde
- Tales of the Low Tech Troubadour Vol. 1
- Best Kept Secrets (1985)
- Cuttlefish Live
- Watersongs (1998) Fiddler's Wynde
- Homework (CD – 31 October 2000) Fiddler's Wynde
- Sweetwater Pete (23 January 2006) Fiddler's Wynde
- Invitation (26 February 2008) Fiddler's Wynde
- Who Killed the Dragon? (with David Young)
- Magic Moments from the Children's Nature Schoolhouse – Lake Metroparks
- D.A.T.'s The Way It's Done! (1992) Fiddler's Wynde Music – Cassette
- All the Rivers Run – Cuyahoga Valley Environmental Education Center
- South Shore Serenade (26 March 1998) Fiddler's Wynde
- Rules of the Road (26 March 1998) Fiddler's Wynde
- Live at the Kent Stage: Dancing With the Muse (18 November 2008) Little Fish Records
- Connected to the Web (24 February 2004) Fiddler's Wynde
- Fall & Angels (2008) Little Fish Records
- A Tribute to the Great Lakes (with Pat Dailey & Murdock) (2006) Centers for Ocean Sciences Education Excellence
- Fly Away (2010) Fiddler's Wynde
- I have No Wings (2012) Fiddler's Wynde
- Dreams Came (2015) Fiddler's Wynde (Alex Bevan and David J. Young)
- Boomer (24 January 2016) Fiddler's Wynde
- True Meridian (1 June 2017) Fiddler's Wynde
- Hunker Downtime Demos (25 June 2020) Fiddler's Wynde
- Sparrow (20 May 2023) Fiddler's Wynde

== Also appears on ==
- The Pride of Cleveland: WMMS FM 101 – Various (1980) (CD release 2002 Esquire Records)
- Raw Bars – Pat Dailey (with Macaw) (1994) Olympia Records Inc.
- Shorelines – Pat Dailey – Olympia Records
- Pat Dailey Live 'N' Kickin (2000) Olympia Records Inc.
- Woodchoppers Ball – Various (2007) Divine Wind Records
- Been Through So Much Together: The Songs of John Bassette – Various (2007) Skylyne Records
- ...In Blue – Mike Calzone (2007) Little Fish Records

== Filmography ==
Bevan performs in the TV special The Return of the Cuyahoga (2008) – Florentine Films/Hott Productions Inc., America's River Communities, Inc., and WVIZ/PBS ideastream

== Media appearances ==
- WNCX Morning Show: 6 April 2007 on YouTube
- Cain Park 1991 on YouTube
