= The Vindys =

American rock band

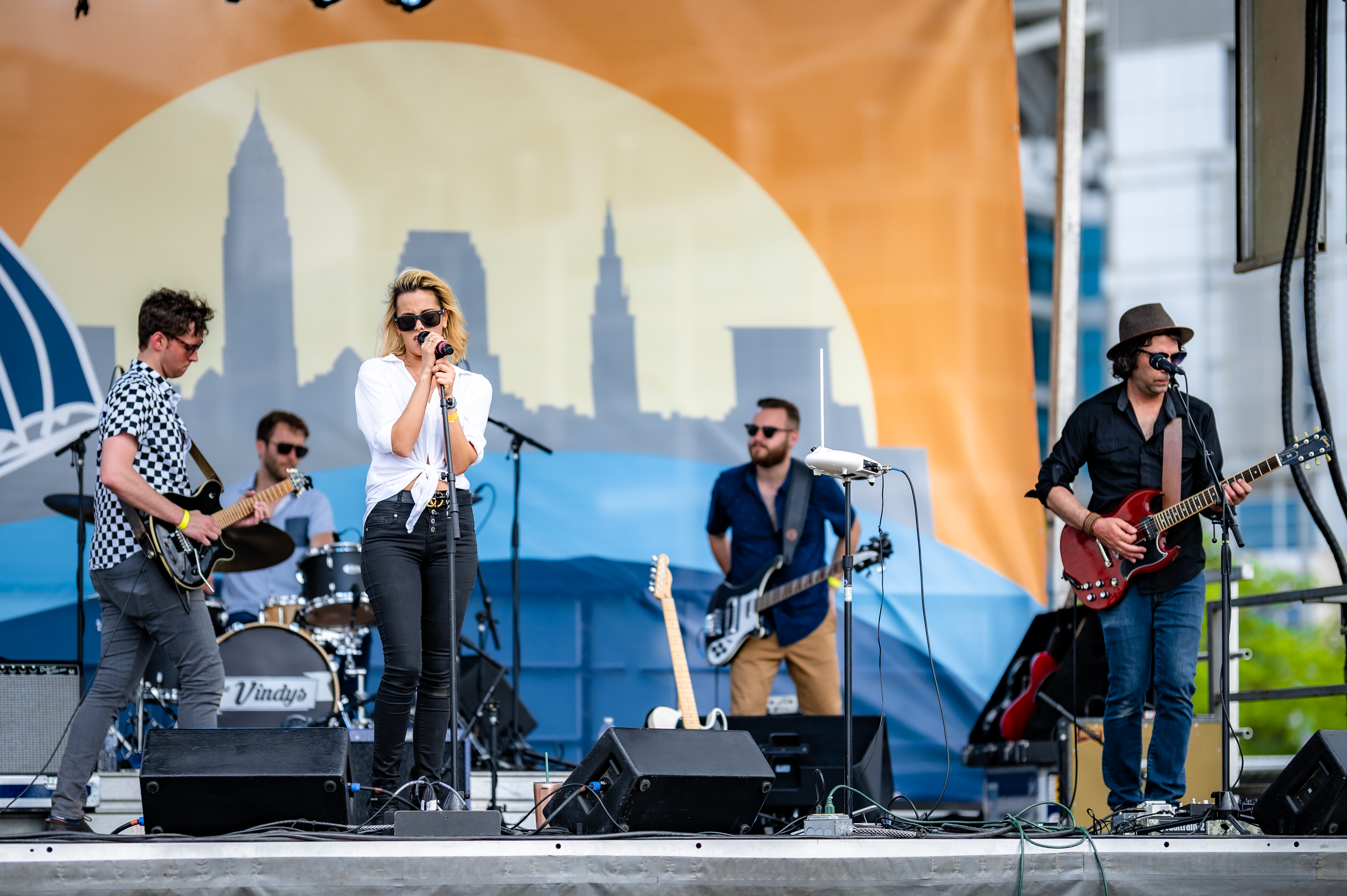
- The Vindys performing in 2019

Background information
- Origin: Youngstown, Ohio, United States
- Genres: Rock, pop, soul, blues, jazz
- Years active: 2014 – present
- Members: Jackie Popovec; John Anthony; Rick Deak; Owen Davis; Brendan Burke; Nathan Anthony; Kyle O'Donnell; Brian Mayle; Garret Kuchmaner
- Past members: Nicholas Sainato; Ed Davis; Scott Boyer
- Website: www.thevindys.com

The Vindys are an American pop rock band based in Youngstown, Ohio. They are known for their 2024–2025 tours with Pat Benatar and for the 2023 sports anthem "Are You Ready," as well as orchestral collaborations and soundtrack appearances.

Founded in 2014 and rooted in northeast Ohio, the band grew over the following decade from a regional Midwest group to a nationally known act. The current members are vocalist Jackie Popovec, guitarists John Anthony and Rick Deak, keyboardist Nathan Anthony, bassist Brendan Burke, drummer Owen Davis, saxophonist Garret Kuchmaner, trumpeter Kyle O’Donnell, and trombonist Brian Mayle, the last three known as the Youngstown Horns.

== History ==
=== Formation and Red Wine EP ===
The Vindys began in 2014 as a local cover band that included guitarist John Anthony, original drummer Nicholas Sainato, and a singer. The band's name derives from the Youngstown daily newspaper The Vindicator as a tribute to the group's hometown roots.

After lead singer and songwriter Jackie Popovec joined the band in 2014, they started writing original songs—initially mostly by Popovec, and later by other members as well. Their first EP, 2014's Red Wine, which was picked up by the Summit 91.3 FM radio. The EP included the horn section that would later be seen as a prominent element of the band's sound. Music Connection described the music as a "vibrant slice of vintage pop theatre", while noting that the "material will have to improve".

=== Keep Going and Bugs ===
The Vindys released their first full-length album, Keep Going, in 2017. Their next was a live recording, Live at Westside Bowl, recorded at that Youngstown venue in October 2019 and released in March 2021.

Their second full-length studio album, Bugs, came out on July 31, 2021, after a COVID-19 pandemic delay. Ideastream described it as "fus[ing] the group's vintage jazz aesthetic with a more straightforward blues-rock sound" and The Repository described it as "a record showcasing a maturing, versatile band whose musical palette encompasses everything from gritty classic rock to vintage jazz to refined pop."

=== 2023–present: ESPN anthem, Pat Benatar tours ===
The band resumed extensive touring as the pandemic receded. In 2023, while some outlets were still describing them as a local band, their song "Are You Ready" became a sports anthem on ESPN's ACC Network, heard in promotional spots, telecasts and montages for the Pittsburgh Pirates and Pittsburgh Penguins and in ESPN's NCAA Softball Championship coverage. Another highlight of 2023 was a pops show with the Canton Symphony Orchestra in March.

In December 2023 they released the holiday single "Too Elfin' Cold – Live at Peppermint Recording Studios." On the sports tip, they were booked to headline the inaugural SCAG Power Equipment PRO Superstar Shootout concert series in February 2024.

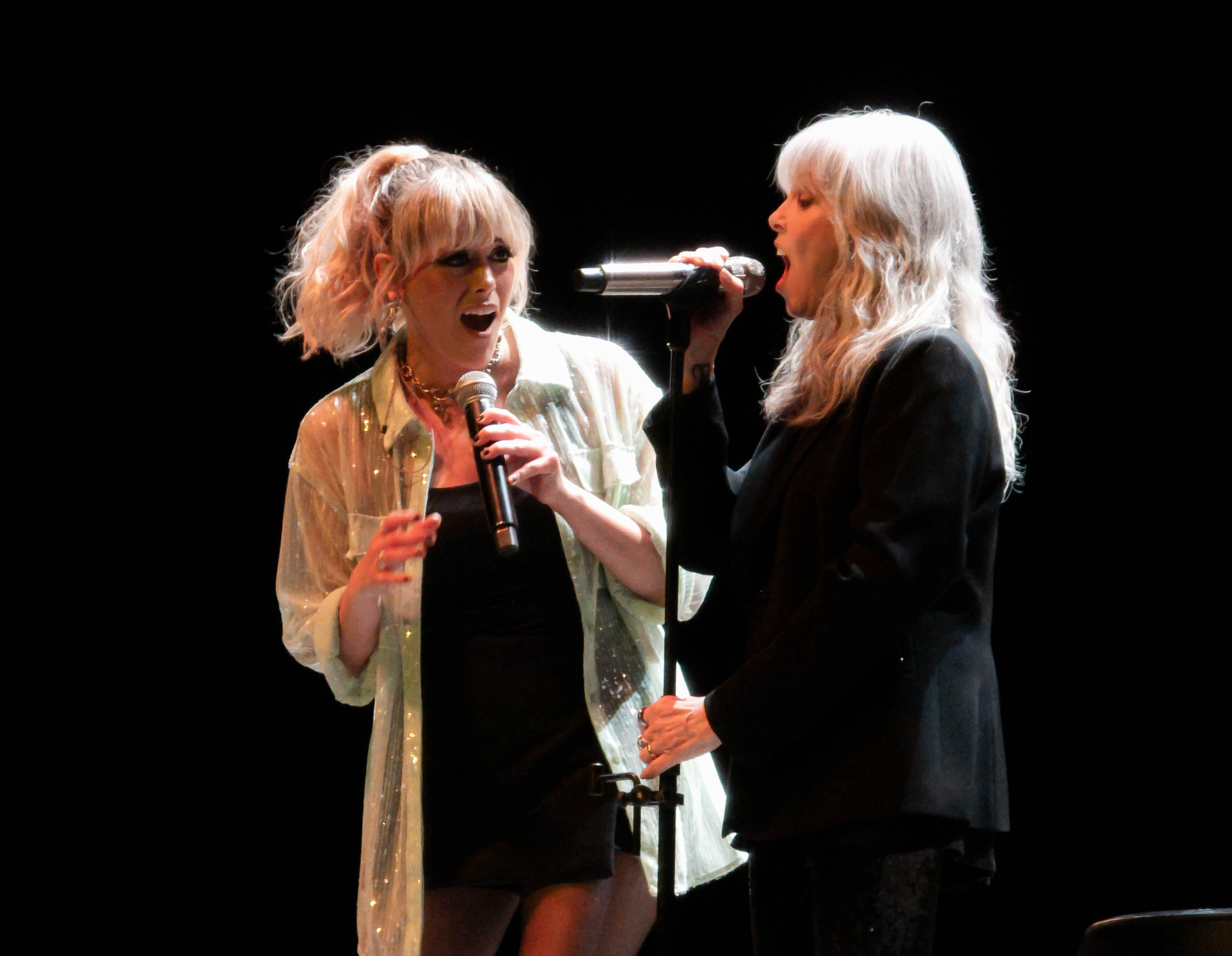
The Vindys vocalist Jackie Popovec alongside Pat Benatar, 2025

The title track of Bugs is featured on the soundtrack of the 2024 horror film Last Night at Terrace Lanes, and the video, directed by Peter-John Campbell, was selected as a featured short at the 2023 Tribeca Film Festival.

The band collaborated with the Worthington Chamber Orchestra in November 2023, and with the Youngstown Symphony Orchestra in April 2024.

On May 30, 2024 the Vindys premiered the single "Elton Glasses Baby" live on Fox 7 Austin before its June 28 release. On March 21, 2025, they released the single "Electric." But they delayed a planned spring 2024 album release for an understandable reason: to focus on tour dates with Pat Benatar and Neil Giraldo. After numerous appearances with the pair in 2024, the collaboration continued when the classic-rock legends engaged the Vindys to be their opening act on a 26-city spring 2025 North American tour.

On July 23, 2026, the band performed before over 10,000 Scouts, Scouters, Staff, and Guests at the 2026 National Scout Jamboree (Scouting America) Opening Ceremonies at Summit Bechtel Reserve in Glen Jean, West Virginia.

== Discography ==
Title	Year	Type
Red Wine (EP)	2014	EP
"Christmas (Baby Please Come Home)"	2016	Single
"Too Long"	2017	Single
Keep Going	2017	Studio album
"Classic"	2017	Single
"Want Your Heart"	2018	Single
"Are You Ready"	2019	Single
"If I Want"	2020	Single
"Don't Ask / Whipping Post (Live at the Westside Bowl)"	2020	Single
"Wrong With Me / Sweet Child 'O Mine (Live at the Westside Bowl)"	2021	Single
Live at Westside Bowl	2021	Live album
"Morning Light"	2021	Single
"Bugs"	2021	Single
Bugs	2021	Studio album
"Too Elfin’ Cold – Live at Peppermint Recording Studios."	2023	Single
"Elton Glasses Baby"	2024	Single
"Electric"	2025	Single
"Ooh La La"	2025	Single
"Black Magic"	2025	Single
"Same Stars"	2026	Single
Trap Door	2026	Studio album
